= List of grape varieties =

This list of grape varieties includes cultivated grapes, whether used for wine, or eating as a table grape, fresh or dried (raisin, currant, sultana). For a complete list of all grape species, including those unimportant to agriculture, see Vitis.

The term grape variety refers to cultivars (rather than the botanical varieties that must be named according to the International Code of Nomenclature for algae, fungi, and plants).

== Single-species grapes ==
While some of the grapes in this list are hybrids, they are hybridized within a single species. For those grapes hybridized across species, known as interspecific hybrids, see the section on multispecies hybrid grapes below.

=== Vitis vinifera (wine) ===
==== Red grapes ====
Common name(s)	Image	All synonyms	Country of origin	Pedigree	Hectares cultivated (year)	Year of introduction
Abbuoto		Aboto, Cecubo.	Italy, Lazio	Possible natural Piedirosso × Casavecchia cross	717 (2000)	1984
Abouriou		Beaujolais, Early Burgunder, Early Burgundy, Gamay Beaujolais, Gamay du Rhône, Gamay St-Laurent, Malbec Argente Negret de la Canourgue, Noir Hatif, Plant Abouriou, Plant Précoce, Précoce Naugé, Précoce Noir, Pressac de Bourgogne.	France, Southwest	Potential (not yet confirmed) parent is Magdeleine Noire des Charentes, mother of Merlot and Cot		
Abrusco		Abrostalo, Abrostine, Abrostino, Abrusco nero, Abrusco nero di toscana, Abrusio, Colore, Colorino	Italy, Tuscany		6 (2000)	< 1600
Acitana		Citana Nera	Northeast Sicily			
Acolon			Germany	Blaufränkisch × Dornfelder	135	1971
Ada Karasi		Adakarasi, Adakarassy, Avsa adasi, Avsa island, Balikesir, Erdek, Noir des iles.	Turkey			1800s
Affenthaler		Affenthaler schwarzblau, Affenthaler blauer, Blauer affenthaler, Burgunder saeuerlich, Kleiner trollinger, Morillon aigret, Pineau aigret, Saeuerlicher burgunder, Schwarzblaue affenthaler, Trollinger klein.	Germany	One parent may be Heunisch weiss		1250
Agiorgitiko		Aghiorghitico, Aghiorghitiko, Nemeas Mavro, Nemeas Mavroudi, St.George.	Greece			
Aglianico		Aglianco di puglia, Aglianica, Aglianichella, Aglianichello, Aglianico amaro, Aglianico crni, Aglianico del vulture, Aglianico di castellaneta, Aglianico di taurasi, Aglianico femminile, Aglianico mascolino, Aglianico nero, Aglianico pannarano, Aglianico tringarulo, Aglianico zerpoluso, Aglianico zerpuloso, Aglianicuccia, Agliano, Agliatica, Agliatico, Agnanico, Agnanico di castellaneta, Alianiko, Cascavoglia, Cerasole, Ellanico, Ellenico, Fiano rosso, Fresella, Gagliano, Ghiandara, Ghianna, Ghiannara, Glianica, Gnanica, Gnanico, Granica, Granico, Olivella di san cosmo, Prie blanc, Ruopolo, Spriema, Tringarulo, Uva catellaneta, Uva dei cani, Uva di castellaneta, Uva nera.	Italy, Basilicata and Campania			
Aglianicone		Aglianico bastardo, Aglianicone nero, Glianicone, Ruopolo.	Italy, Basilicata and Campania		140 (2000)	8 BCE
Agni (grape)			Czech Republic	Andre × Irsai Olivér		
Agronomica			Portugal			Late 1900s
Agua Santa			Portugal	Camarate × Periquita		1948
Aidani Mavro		Aedano mavro, Aidani noir, Aidano mavro, Ithani mavro, Mavraidano, Mayraedano, Santorin.	Greece			
Aladasturi		Aladastouri, Anadassaouli, Anadassaouli femelle, Anadassaouli male, Anadastouri.	Georgia			
Albaranzeuli nero			Italy, Sardinia			
Albarossa		Dalmasso, Incrocio dalmasso.	Italy, Veneto region	Chatus (Nebbiolo Di Dronero) × Barbera	10 (2000)	1938
Aleatico		Aglianico nero, Agliano, Agliatico, Aleatiau, Aleatica, Aleatica di firenze, Aleatichina, Aleatico, Aleatico ceragino, Aleatico ciliegino, Aleatico comune, Aleatico de corse, Aleatico de florence, Aleatico de portoferraio, Aleatico de solmona, Aleatico dell'elba, Aleatico di altamura, Aleatico di benevento, Aleatico di firenze, Aleatico di portoferraio, Aleatico di sulmona, Aleatico di toscana, Aleatico gentile, Aleatico nera della toscana, Aleatico nero, Aleatico nero della toscana, Aleatico nero di fermo, Aleatico nero di firenze, Aleatico perugino, Aleaticonera, Aleaticu, Aleatiko, Aleatiko nero, Alegatico, Aliatico, Aliatico di benevento, Aliaticu, Alleaticu, Allianico, Allianico degli abruzzi, Blacan, Halapi, Ispanskii rozovyi, Lacrima christi, Lakrima dolche, Lakrima kriati, Leatico, Livatica, Mockatele livatike, Moscatele livatice, Moscatelle livatiche, Moscatello nero, Moscato nero, Moskatele livatike, Muscatellus, Muskat toskanski, Muskat toskanskij, Myuskatele livatike, Nero, Occhio di pernice, Occhio di pernice nera, Ogliatico, Pelaverde, Rossanella, Uva aleatica, Uva aleatico, Uva dei gesuiti, Uva liatica, Uva liatika, Vernaccia di pergola, Vernaccia moscatella.	Italy			<14th century
Aleksandrouli		Aleksandroouly, Aleksandrouli, Aleksandrouli shavi, Alexandreouli, Alexandreuli, Alexandroouli, Alexandrouly, Alexsandrouli, Kabistona, Kabistoni.	Georgia			
Alexander		Alexandria, Black cape, Black grape, Buck grape, Cape, Cape grape, Clifton's constantia, Clifton's lombardia, Columbian, Constantia, Farkers grape, Madeira of york, Rothrock, Rothrock of prince, Schuylkill, Schuylkill muscadel, Schuylkill muscadine, Springmill constantia, Tasker's grape, Vevay, Vevay winne, Winne, York lisbon.	United States	Vitis Labrusca × ?		1740
Alfrocheiro		Albarin frances, Albarin negrin, Albarin negro, Albarin tinto, Albarinon, Alfrocheiro preto, Alfrucheiro, Alfurcheiro, Baboso negro, Bastardo negro, Brunal, Caino gordo, Tinta bastardinha, Tinta francesa de viseu, Tinta francisca de viseu, Tinto serodo.	Portugal		<1800s	
Alicante Henri Bouschet		Alicant de pays, Alicante, Alicante bouchet, Alicante bouschet, Alicante bouschet crni, Alicante extra fertile, Alicante femminello, Alicanteh Bouschet, Alicante nero, Alicante noir, Alicantina, Alikant buse, Alikant, Buse bojadiser, Alikant bushe, Alikant bushe ekstrafertil, Alikant genri bushe, Alikante henri bouschet, Aragonais, Aragones, Arrenaou, Baga, Bakir uezuemue, Barvarica, Blasco, Bojadiserka, Carignan jaune, Cupper grape, Dalmatinka, Garnacha, Garnacha tintorera, Kambusa, Lhadoner, Moraton, Mouraton, Murviedro, Negral, Pe de perdiz, Pe de pombo, Petit bouschet, Redondal, Rivesaltes, Rivos altos, Roussillon, Rouvaillard, Sumo tinto, Tinta fina, Tinta francesa, Tinto, Tinto nero, Tinto velasco, Tintorera, Tintorera de liria, Tintorera de longares, Tinturao, Uva di spagna.	France	Petit Bouschet × Grenache		1855
Allegro		Geisenheim	Germany	Chancellor × Rondo		1983
Amaral		Amaral preto, Azal, Azal preto, Azal tinto, Azar, Cachon, Cainho bravo, Cainho miudo, Caino, Caino bravo, Caino tinto, Cainzinho, Sousao, Sousao galego.	Portugal			
Ancellotta			Italy, Emilia-Romagna	Cañocazo × Pedro Ximénez 2	19 (Switzerland 2009)	
André (grape)		Andrea, Semenac.	Czech Republic	Blaufränkisch × St. Laurent		1960
Antey Magarachsky		Antei magarachskii, Antei, Antei magaracha, Antei magaratchsky, Antej magaratscha, Antey magarachskii, Magarach.	Ukraine	Rubinovyi Magaracha × Seyve Villard 20347		1971
Aramon Noir		Amor Nao Me Deixes, Aramon, Aramon Chernyi, Aramon Crni, Aramon Negro, Aramon Noire, Aramon Pignat, Aramon Pigne, Aramon Rozovyi, Aramon Saint Joseph, Aramone, Aramonen, Aramont, Arramant, Arramont, Burchardt's Prince, Burckarti Prinz, Burkhardt, Eramoul, Eromoul, Gros Bouteillan, Kek Aramon, Pisse Vin, Plant Riche, Rabalaire, Ramonen, Reballaire, Reballayre, Revalaire, Revellaire, Ugni Neru, Ugni Nevu, Ugni Noir, Uni Negre, Uni Noir.	France, Languedoc	Ouliven × Heunisch Weiss	9,100 (France 2000)	Early 1800s
Areni		Areni sev, Areni chemyl, Areni chernyi, Areni noir, Areni tcheurny, Areny, Areny tcherny, Lyalai, Malagi, Malagui, Malahi noir, Malai sev, Malat, Malayi, Memeyi, Mialai, Milahi, Milai chernyi, Milai noir, Milaj sev, Milakhi, Movouz, Movuz, Myalai, Myalan, Ordoutchi sev, Ordoutzi sev, Ordutsi sev, Orduzi sev, Ourdoussi, Ourdusi, Ourza sev, Sev areni, Sev malahi, Urdusi, Ursa sev, Urza sev, Usza sev.	Armenia			
Argaman			Israel			1971
Argant		Argan, Blaue Gansfuesser, Blauer Gansfuesser, Bockshorn, Buchser, Erlenbacher, Espagnol, Gaensefuessler, Gaensfuessel, Gaensfuesser, Gaensfuesser Blau, Gaensfuessler, Gansfyuser, Gros Margilien Espagnol, Gros Margillien, Gros Margillien Arbois, Grossrote, Margilien, Margillien, Margillin, Rouillot, Schwarzer Erlenbacher, Tokai Chernyi, Tokai Rannii.	Spain			1 CE
Arinarnoa			France	Tannat × Cabernet Sauvignon		1956
Arinto de Bucelas		Arintho, Arinto Cachudo, Arinto Cercial, Arinto D'anadia, Arinto Galego, Asal Espanhol, Asal Galego, Assario Branco, Azal Espanhol, Azal Galego, Boal Cachudo, Branco Espanhol, Cerceal, Chapeludo, Malvasia Fina, Pe De Perdiz Branco, Pederna, Pedernao, Pedrena, Terrantez Da Terceira, Val De Arintho.	Portugal			
Arnsburger		Arns burguer, Arnsburguer, Geisenheim.	Germany	Müller-Thurgau × Weisser Gutedel		1939
Arrouya		Arhuya, Aroyat, Arrouyat, Arroya, Arruya, Dourec Noir, Eremachaoua, Erematxahua, Rouja, Vieux Rouge.	France, Jurançon AOC			
Ashughaji		Achougage, Atpizh, Atpyuzh, Atriuzh, Atvige, Atvizh, Ashugazh.	Georgia			Early 1900s
Aspiran Bouschet		Aspiran Bouchet, Aspiran Bouson, Grand Noir De Laques, Spigamonti.	France, Languedoc	Rivairenc × Teinturier	7 (1988)	1865
Aspiran Noir		Aspiran, Aspiran Chernyi, Aspiran Csornüj, Aspirant, Epiran, Espiran, Peyral, Peyrar, Piran, Ribeyrenc, Rivairenc, Riverain, Riveyrenc, Riveyrene, Spiran, Verdai, Verdal, Verdal Noir.	France			1900s
Assario		Assario Negro	Portugal			
Asuretuli Shavi		Assouretouli, Assouretouli chavi, Asuretuli, Asuretuli sciavi, Chalbtchbaru, Chalbtraouvan, Chalchvarce, Chale, Chaltraouben, Sal uezuem, Schalltraube, Shadi traube, Shal, Shal izyum, Shal uzum, Shal'shvarsh, Shal'shvarts, Shala, Shalsharz, Shalshvari, Shalshvarts, Shaltraube, Shaltrauben.	Georgia			
Aubun			France, Rhone valley		1,400 (2000)	1885
Avanà		Alvana Di Susa, Avana, Avana De Susa, Avana Di Susa, Avana Nero, Avanale, Avanas, Avanato, Avane, Avena, Avenai, Bibou, Davana, Guibou, Havana, Havana, Hibou, Hibou Noir, Hivernais, Hyvernais, Luisant, Palofrais, Polafrais, Polofrais, Pometre, Promeche, Promere, Raisin Cerise, Ribou, Vermaglio.	Italy, Piedmont		30 (2000)	
Avarengo		Amarene, Avarena, Avarenc, Avarene, Avarengo Comune, Avarengo Comune Nero, Avarengo Di Piemonte, Avarengo Fino, Avarengo Grosso, Avarengo Mezzano, Avarengo Piccolo, Avarengo Rama-Bessa, Avarengo Ramabessa, Avarengo Ramafessa, Boffera, Croassera, Mostera Ivrea, Mostera Nera, Mosterce, Mostero, Mostero Rosso, Mosto, Mostona, Mostosa, Mostoson, Muster, Riondasca, Riondosca, Riundasca, Rondasca.	Italy, Piedmont			
Avgoustiatis		Avgoustella, Aygoustiates.	Greece			1930s
Băbească neagră		Aldarusa, Asil Kara, Babeasca, Babiasca Niagra, Babiaska Niagra, Bobiaska Niagra, Bobyaksa Nigra, Bobyaska Nyagra, Bobyaska Nyaqra, Caldarusa, Cerniy Redkiy, Chernyi Redkii, Chernyj Redkij, Chernyl Redkyl, Ciornai Redchii, Ciornii Redchii, Coldarusha, Copuiac, Cracana, Cracanata, Crecanat, Crecanate, Gara Serektsiya, Gara Serexia, Goldaroucha, Grossmuttertraube, Hexentraube, Kaouchanskii, Koldaroucha, Koldarusa, Koldarusha, Koldursha, Koptchak, Koptchakk, Krekanat, Krekanate, Loose Black Grape, Neagra Rara, Niagra Rara, Nyagra Rara, Poama Rara Neagra, Poma Rara Niagra, Poma Rara Nyagra, Qara Dereksiya, Racanata, Ramturata, Rara Neagra, Rara Negra Moldarsky, Rara Niagra, Rara Nyagra, Rara Nyaqra, Raraneagra, Raschirata, Rastoparca, Rastopirka, Rastopyrka, Rastrepa, Rastreppa, Rastriopa, Redkyi Chernyi, Rekhavo Grazdi, Rekhavo Grozdi, Rekhavo Grozdy, Rexavo Grozdi, Richkirate, Richkiriata, Riedkym, Rimpurate, Rimtsurate, Rimtzourate, Rindsourata, Rishki Rate, Rishky Rate, Riski Rate, Rossmuffertraube, Rostopiska, Rostopoveska, Rychkirate, Rymourate, Rympurate, Ryshkirate, Saesser, Sassep, Sasser, Serecsia, Serecsia Ciornaia, Serectia, Serectia Ciornaia, Serekcia Tcheurnaia, Sereksia, Sereksia Chornaya, Sereksiya, Sereksiya Chernaya, Sereksiya Tschiornaya, Serektsiya, Serescia, Serexia, Serexia Noir, Serexia Tcheurnaia, Sesser, Stropatai, Stropatny, Stropatnyj, Stropaty, Stropatyi, Tchernyi Redkii, Tcheurny Redky, Timofeevka, Totlear, Tsotler, Tsotlyar.	Romania		6,300 (2005)	1300s
Babić		Babcevica, Babic Crni, Babic Mali, Babic Pivati, Babic Pluskavi, Babic Veliki, Babica Crna, Babica Crni, Babica Gresljivka Crni, Babica Mala, Babica Velika, Babicevic, Babicevica, Babika, Babika Vela, Babina, Babinka, Babinka Vela, Babitch, Babitza, Babytch, Crnac Rani, Crnac Rani A Sibenik, Divljak A Zadar, Grastavac, Gresljivka, Pazanin, Resljivka, Rogoznicanin, Rogoznicka, Roguljanac, Roguljanak A Sibenik, Shibenchanatz, Sibencanac, Sibencanac A Zadar.	Croatia			1890s
Bachet Noir		Bachet, Bachey, Francois, Francois Noir, Francois Noir De Bar-Sur-Aube, Gris Bachet.	France	Heunisch Weiss × Pinot		1890s
Baco Noir		Baco, Baco Negru, Bacoi, Bago, Bako Noar, Bako Sieiski, Bako Speiskii, Bakon, Wolfschlugen, Frybert.	France	Folle Blanche × Riparia Grand Glabre		1902
Baga		Baga De Louro, Bagrina Crvena, Baguinha, Bairrada, Bairrado Tinta, Baya, Carrasquenho, Carrega Burros, Goncalveira, Morete, Moreto, Paga Divida, Paga Dividas, Poeirinha, Poeirinho, Povolide, Preiinho, Pretinho, Preto Rifete, Rifete, Rosete, Tinta Bairrada, Tinta Bairradina, Tinta Da Bairrada, Tinta De Baga, Tinta Fina.	Portugal			
Barbera		Barbera Amaro, Barber a Raspo Rosso, Barbera a Peduncolo Rosso, Barbera a Peduncolo verde, Barbera a Raspo verde, Barbera Crna, Barbera d'Asti, Barbera dolce, Barbera fina, Barbera forte, Barbera grossa, Barbera Mercantile, Barbera Monferrato, Barbera nera, Barbera Nostrana, Barbera riccia, Barbera Rissa, Barbera rosa, Barbera vera, Barberone, Besagno, Cosses Barbusen, Gaietto, Lombardesca, Ughetta	Italy		28,000 (2000)	1300s
Barbera del Sannio			Italy, Campania			
Barbera Sarda			Italy, Sardinia			
Barsaglina		Barsullina, Bersaglina, Massareta, Massaretta	Italy, Tuscany and Liguria		30 (2000)	
Bastardo Magarachsky		Bastardo Magarachskii, Bastard De Magaraci, Bastard Von Magaratsch, Bastardo Magaraca, Bastardo Magarach, Bastardo Magarachsky, Bastardo Magaratchskii, Basztardo Magaracsszkij, Magarach Bastardo, Magaratch.	Ukraine	Bastardo × Saperavi		1936
Beaunoir		Beau Noir, Beaunoire, Cep Gris, Co Gris, Mourillon, Pinot D'Ai, Pinot D'Ailly, Pinot D'Orleans, Seau Gris, Sogris.	France	Heunisch Weiss × Pinot		1883
Béclan		Beclan Petit, Baccalan, Baclan, Baclans, Becclan, Beikian, Beitrian, Durau, Dureau, Duret, Margillin Petit, Petit Beclan, Petit Dureau, Petit Margillin, Rousette Noire, Saunoir, Saut Noir, Sceau Noir, Seaut Noir, Suessschwarz.	France			
Beichun		Bei Chun	China	Muscat Hamburg × Amurensis		1954
Bekari		Bekaro, Mbekari Mavro, Mbekaro, Mpekari, Mpekari Mavro, Mpekaro.	Greece			
Belat			Spain			1997
Béquignol Noir		Balouzat, Bequignaou, Bequin Rouge, Blanc Fer, Bouton Blanc, Breton, Cabernet, Camerouge, Chalosse Noir, Chalosse Noire, Chausse, Chausset, Egrenant, Embalouzat, Enrageat Rouge, Grosse Here, Here, Jurancon, Mancais Noir, Maouron, Mauron, Micardeau, Negrotte, Noir Cimrah, Noir De Cimrah, Noir De Valin, Petit Fer, Plant De Dissay, Prunalet, Raboso Piave, Sencit Gris	France			
Biborkadarka		Bibor Kadarka, Biborkadarsa.	Hungary	Kadarka × Muscat Bouschet		1948
Black Magic			Moldavia			1970s
Black Queen		Pok Dum, Pokdum	Japan	Bailey × Golden Queen		1927
Blatina		Blarina Velika Prarnobacva, Blathina, Blatina Black, Blatina Blaue, Blatina Crna, Blatina Hercegovacka, Blatina Mala, Blatina Nera, Blatina Noir, Blatina Noire, Blatina Velika, Blatyna, Praznobacva, Praznobatchva, Stara Zilavka, Tribidrag, Tribirad, Trzhbii Drak, Zilavka Stara, Zlorod.	Bosnia & Herzegovina			
Blauburger		Klosterneuburg	Austria	Blauer Portugieser × Blaufränkisch		1923
Blauer Arbst / Pinot Noir		Pinot Noir, Aprofekete, Arbst, Arbst Blau, Arbst Blauer, Assmannshaeuser, Augustiner, Auvergnat, Auvernas, Auvernas Rouge, Auvernat, Auvernat Noir, Auxerra, Berligout, Black Burgundy, Black Morillon, Blak Burgundy, Blau Burgunder, Blauburgunder, Blauer, Blauer Augustiner, Blauer Burgunder, Blauer Claevner, Blauer Clevner, Blauer Klaevener, Blauer Klaever, Blauer Klevner, Blauer Klewner, Blauer Nuernberg, Blauer Nuernberger, Blauer Rischling, Blauer Seeklevner, Blauer Spaetburgunder, Blauer Sylvaner, Blaw Shpet Burgunder, Bodenseetraube, Bodenseetraube Blaue, Boehmischer, Bon Plant, Borgogna Nera, Borgogna Nero, Borgogna Rosso, Bourgignon, Bourgignon Noir, Bourgoignon Noir, Bourguignon Gros, Bourguignon Noir, Bourguignon Petit, Bruenlaeubler, Burgunda, Burgundac Cernii, Burgundac Crni, Burgundac Crni Pozni, Burgunder, Burgunder Blau, Burgunder Blauer, Burgunder Grosse Blaue, Burgunder Kleine Blaue, Burgunder Roter, Burgunder Schwarz, Burgundi Crni, Burgundi Mic, Burgundske Modre, Cerna Okrugla, Cerna Okrugta Banka, Cerna Ranka, Chambertin, Champagner, Cherna, Chiavenase, Chiavenna, Chpatchok, Claevner, Claevner Blau, Claevner Schwarz, Clavensis, Clevner, Cortaillod, Derice Auvernas Noir, Dickblau, Echter Schwarzblauer Klevner, Elsasser Rot, Elsasser Rother, Fin Noir, Fin Noir De Toulon, Fin Plant Dore, Formentin Noir, Fraenkische Schwarze, Franc Noiren, Franc Noirien, Franc Pineau, Franc Pinot, Francois Noir, Frischschwarzer, Fruehblaue, Fruehblauer, Fruehschwarzer, Fruhblauer, Gamais, Genetin De St. Menin, Gentil Noir, Glaevinger, Glasschwarz, Gribalet Noir, Grobes Suesschwarz, Grosse Burgunder, Grosse Fruehschwarze, Gut Blau, Gutblau, Jakabszoeloe, Karapino, Kek Burgundi, Kek Kisburgundi, Kek Klevner, Kek Rulandi, Kis Burgundi, Kis Burgundikek, Kisburgundi Kek, Kisburgundikek, Klaevner, Klaevner Schwarz, Klebrot, Klebroth, Klebrott, Kleine Burgunder, Kleiner Burgunder, Kleinrot, Kleinroth, Klevinger, Klevner, Klevner Kek, Klevner Schwarzblau, Korai Kekburgundi, Langedet, Maehrchen, Malterdinger, Maltertinger, Maria Feld, Marillon N, Massoutel, Massoutet, Maurillon, Mensois, Modra Burgunda, Modra Klevanja, Modra Klevanjka, Modra Klevanyka, Modri Pinot, Moehrchen, Mohrenkoenigin, Mohrenkoenigin Fruehblaue, Mor Burgunder, Moreote Noir, Moreotische Traube, Morillon, Morillon Noir, Nagyburgundi, Nere, Neyran, Neyron Petit, Noble, Noble Joue, Noir De Franconier, Noir De Versitch, Noir Menu, Noir Meun, Noiried, Noirien, Noirien Franc, Noirien Ternent, Noirin, Noirun, Okrugla Ranka, Ordinaerer Blauer, Ordinaerer Rother, Orleans, Petit Noir, Petit Noirin, Petit Plant Dore, Petit Verot, Pignol, Pignola, Pignolet, Pignoliga, Pignolo, Pignuola, Pimbart, Pineau, Pineau De Bourgogne, Pineau De Bourgoyne, Pineau De Chambertin, Pineau De Gevrey, Pineau Franc, Pineau Noir, Pino Black, Pino Ceren, Pino Cernii, Pino Cheren, Pino Chernyi, Pino Chernyj, Pino Corni, Pino Cornij, Pino Fran, Pino Go, Pino Negru, Pino Nero, Pino Nuar, Pino Qo, Pinot, Pinot Cernii, Pinot Clevner Cl. Maria- Feld, Pinot Crni, Pinot D'Ay, Pinot De Chambertin, Pinot De Fleury, Pinot De Gevrey, Pinot De Migraine, Pinot Droit, Pinot Fin, Pinot Franc Noir, Pinot Mare, Pinot Mariafeld, Pinot Negru, Pinot Nera, Pinot Nero, Pinot Noar, Pinot Noir Cortaillod, Pinot Noir Cortaillod 9–18, Pinot Noir Salvagnin, Pinot Salvagnin, Pinot Tinto, Plack Morillon, Plant A Bon Vin, Plant Dae, Plant De Cumieres, Plant De La Dole Noir, Plant De S. Martin, Plant Dore, Plant Fin, Plant Medaille, Plant Noble, Pynoz, Qara Pino, Raisin De Bourgogne, Raucy, Raucy Male, Roter Assmannhaeuser, Roter Assmannshaeuser, Roter Burgunder, Rother, Rother Assmannshaeuser, Rother Burgunder, Rouci, Rouci Male, Rouci Modre, Roucimodre, Rouget, Rulandske Modre, Salvagnin, Salvagnin Noir, Samoireau, Samoreau, Samtrot, Saumensois, Saumoireau, Savagin Noir, Savagnin Noir, Schurzir Riesling, Schwartz Klevner, Schwarz Traeuble, Schwarzblauer Klevner, Schwarze Fraenkische, Schwarzer, Schwarzer Assmannshaeuser, Schwarzer Burgunder, Schwarzer Champagner, Schwarzer Klaevner, Schwarzer Klevner, Schwarzer Riesling, Schwarzer Rissling, Schwarzer Suessling, Schwarzer Tokayer, Schwarzklaevner, Schwarzklevner, Schwarztraeuble, Servagnin Noir De Seyssel, Sevagnin Noir, Shpachock, Shpachok, Shpetburgunder, Spacok, Spaetburgunder, Spaetburgunder Blauer, Spaeter Burgunder, Spaetes Moehrchen, Spaetes Moerchen, Spatburgunder, Spetburgunder, Suesschwarz Grobes, Suessedel, Suessling, Suessrot, Suessroth, Suessschwarz, Suessschwarzer, Susschwarzer, Sussedel, Sussrot, Sussschwarzer, Talvagnere Rouge, Talvagnues Rouges, Ternent, Thalrother, Tinto, Traminer Blau, Traminer Schwarz, Vert Dore, Vrai Auvernas, Waltertinger.	France			1366
Blauer Wildbacher		Wildbacher Blau, Blauer Greutler, Blauer Kracher, Dioljak, Divljak, Echter Blauer Wildbacher, Echter Wildbacher Blau, Fruehblaue, Fruehblauer Wildbacher, Graeutler, Graeutler Blauer, Grosser Mauserl, Grosses Mauserl, Gutblaue, Kauka Schlechte, Kleinblaue, Kracher Blauer, Kraeutler Blau, Mali Zherni, Maslerl, Mauserl, Mauserl Grosses, Pticnik Crni, Ptinik Crni, Schilcher, Schilchertraube, Schillertraube, Schlechte Kauka, Schlehenolauer Wildbacher, Spaete Blauer Wildbacher, Tizhnik, Vildbasske, Vranek, Vranac, Wildbacher.	Austria			1860s
Blaufränkisch / Limberger		Blanc Doux, Blau Fraenkisch, Blau Fraenkische, Blauer Lemberger, Blauer Limberger, Blaufränkisch, Blaufranchis, Blaufranchisch, Blue French, Burgund Kekfrankos, Burgund Mare, Cerne, Cerne Skalicke, Cerne Starosvetske, Cerny Muskatel, Chirokolistny, Cierny Zierfandler, Crna Frankovka, Crna Moravka, Fernon, Fraenkische, Fraenkische Schwarz, Franconia, Franconia nera, Franconia nero, Franconien bleu, Franconien noir, Frankinja, Frankinja Modra, Frankovka, Frankovka Cerna, Frankovka Crna, Frankovka Modra, Fruehschwarze, Game, Grossburgunder, Imberghem, Imbergher, Jubilaeumsrebe, Karmazin, Kekfrank, Kek Frankos, Kekfrankos, Lampart, Lemberger, Limberg, Limberger blauer, Limberger noir, Limburske, Maehrische, Modra Frankija, Modra Frankinja, Modry Hyblink, Moravka, Moravske, Muskateller Schwarz, Nagyburgundi, Neskorak, Neskore, Neskore Cierne, Noir de Franconie, Oporto, Orna Frankovka, Portugais Lerouse, Portugais Leroux, Portugais Rouge, Portugieser Rother, Pozdni, Pozdni Skalicke Cerne, Schwarz Limberger, Schwarz Fraenkische, Schwarzer Burgunder, Schwarzgrobe, Serina, Shirokolistnyi, Sirokolidtnyj, Sirokolstnii, Starosvetske, Starovetsky Hrozen, Szeleslevelue, Teltfuertue Kekfrankos, Teltfurtu Kekfrankos, Vaghyburgundi, Velke Bugundske, Vojvodino	Austria	Gouais blanc × Frankish grapes	3,340 (Austria), 1,729 (Germany), 1,742 (Slovakia), 8,000 (Hungary), 891 (Romania), 880 (Croatia), 127 (Italia), 30 (United States)	1700s
Bobal		Balau, Balauro, Benicarlo, Boal, Bobal Noir, Bobos, Carignan D'Espagne, Carignan D'Espagne A Fronton, Carignan Espagnol, Coreana, Espagnol, Folle Blanche Du Minervois, Moravio, Pobreton, Provechon, Rageno, Rajeno, Requena, Requenera, Requeno, Terret D'Espagna, Terret D'Espagne, Tinta Madrid, Tinto De Requena, Tinto De Zurra, Tonto De Zurra, Valenciana, Valenciana Tinta, Valenciana Tinto, Vinate.	Spain, Utiel-Requena		90,000	1400s
Boğazkere		Saraplik Siyah, Siyah Saraplik.	Turkey, Elazığ Province			1936
Bombino Nero		Bambino, Buonvino, Buonvino Nero, Calatamuro Nero, Cola Tamburo Nero.	Italy			
Bonamico		Buenamico, Buon Amico, Buonamico, Canaiolo Romano, Ceragia, Dorace, Durace, Giacomino, Neret, Neyret, Pulera, Sangioveto, Tinto, Uva Di Palaia, Uva Rosa.	Italy, Tuscany		100 (2000)	
Bonarda Piemontese		Balsamina, Banarda Di Chieri, Bonarda, Bonarda A Grandes Grappes, Bonarda Del Monferrato, Bonarda Dell' Astigiano, Bonarda Dell' Astigiano E Monferrato, Bonarda Di Asti, Bonarda Di Chieri, Bonarda Di Piemonte, Bonarda Di Pyemont, Bonarda Du Piemont, Bonarda Nera, Bonarda Nero, Driola, Kanaiolo Krasnyi.	Italy, Piedmont			1799
Bonda			Italy, Valle d'Aosta		3 (2000)	
Bondola		Bistershna Zhernina, Bistriska Crnina, Blaustiel Blau, Bonda, Bondola Nera, Bondoletta, Brieger, Briegler, Bundula, Chailloche, Longobardo, Mohrenkoenig.	Switzerland, Ticino			1785
Bondoletta		Bondola	Switzerland	Bondola × Completer		
Bonvedro		Bariadorgia, Bastardo, Bombedra, Bomogastro, Bomvedro, Bonifacienco, Bonifazino, Bonvedro, Bunifazinu, Cacagliola, Carcaghjoliu Neru, Carcaghjolu Neru, Carcagiola, Carcajiola, Carcajola Noir, Carcajolo, Carcajolo Nero, Carcajolo Noir, Cargajola, Caricagiola, Espagnin, Espagnin Noir, False Carignan, Lambrusco De Alentejo, Marota, Monvedro, Monvedro (Oeste), Monvedro De Sines, Monvedro Tinto, Morteira, Murteira, Paraletta, Parralada, Parraleta, Parreleta, Pau Ferro, Ribote, Ribote, Salceno Negro, Tinta Caiada, Tinta Da Lameira, Tinta Do Lameiro, Tinta Lameira, Tinta Murteira, Tintorro, Torres D'Algarve.	Spain			
Borba			Portugal	Muscat Hamburg × Joao Santarem		
Borracal		Azedo, Bagalhal, Bogalhal, Borraco, Borrasao, Bougalhal, Bovvaco, Cachino, Cainho Gordo, Cainho Grande, Cainho Grosso, Caino Del Pais, Caino Gordo, Caino Redondo, Caino Tinto, Esfarrapa, Esfarrapas, Espadeiro Redondo, Morraca, Murracal, Oil De Chapaud, Olho De Sapo, Tinta Femia, Tinta Femia De Aldan, Tinto Redondo	Portugal			1790
Bouchalès		Aubet, Bouchales A Buzet, Bouchales Chedy, Bouchalets, Bouchares, Bouchedey, Boucheres, Bouissalet, Bouscales, Bouscares, Bouyssalet, Capbreton Rouge, Cayla, Crapput, Craput, Cujas, Esparbasque, Grappu, Grappu De La Dordogne, Grapput, Gros Bouchales, Gros Bouchares, Gros De Judith, Gros Grappu, Gros Marthy, Gros Marty, Gros Maure, Gros Mol, Jeanjean, Negrasse, Picardan, Picardan Noir, Piquardan, Plant Touzan, Prolongeau, Prueyras, Queuefort, Toussan, Touzan.	France, Gironde			
Bourrisquou		Bourrignou, Bourriscou, Bourrisquou De Romanet, Bourrisquou De Romani, Mourrisquou De Romani, Romanet.	France	Heben × Monastrell		
Bouteillan Noir		Bouteillan A Gros Grain, Boutelion Noir, Caian, Callion Nero, Cargomuou, Cayau, Esfouiral, Esfouiras De Roquemaure, Fouiral, Mentone, Moulas, Petit Bouteillan, Plant De Psalmodi, Psalmodi Noir, Psalmody, Quagliana, Quagliano Nero, Quaian, Quajan, Quagliano, Qualiano, Sigotier, Sigoyer.	Italy			
Bovale Grande		Bova Murru, Bovale, Bovale Di Spagna, Bovale Grosso, Bovale Mannu, Bovale Murru, Bovali Mannu, Maraiola Maggiore, Mostaia, Nieddera, Tintarella, Tintiglia, Tintilia, Tintillosa, Tintillu, Tintirella, Zinzillosa.	Italy, Sardinia			1300s
Bovale Sardo		Graciano, Alicante, Bastardo Nero, Bois Dur, Bordelais, Bovale, Bovale Piccolo, Bovale Piticco, Bovaleddo, Bovaleddu, Bovali Mannu, Bualeddu, Cadelanisca, Cagliunari, Cagniulari, Cagnolari Nero, Cagnonale, Cagnorali Nero, Cagnovali, Cagnovali Nero, Cagnulari, Cagnulari Bastardo, Cagnulari Sardo, Cagnulatu, Calda Reio, Caldareddhu, Caldareddu, Caldarello, Cardanissia, Cardinissia, Cargo Muol, Carrixa, Casca, Cendron, Charge Mulet, Courouillade, Couthurier, Couturier, Drug, Enfarine, Graciana, Graciano 15–5, Graciano Tinto, Gros Negrette, Grosse Negrette, Himrisnky, Jerusano, Karis, Marastel, Maristeddo, Matarou, Materou, Minostello, Minustello, Minustellu, Minustillu, Monastel, Monasteou, Monaster, Monastrel, Monastrell Menudo, Monastrell Verdadero, Monestaou, Monestel, Moraiola Minore, Morastel, Morastell, Morestel, Moristell, Morrastel, Morrastel Tantot, Moura, Mourastel, Mouroustel, Mourrastel, Murastellu, Muristeddo, Muristeddu, Muristellu, Negrette De Montauban, Negrette De Pays, Nieddu Prunizza, Perpignan, Perpignanou Bois Dur, Perpigne, Plant De Ledenon, Tanat Gris, Tannat Bordelais, Tannat Gris, Tinta, Tinta De Fontes, Tinta Do Padre Antonio, Tinta Fontes, Tinta Mencida, Tinta Menuda, Tinta Miuda, Tinta Miuda De Fontes, Tintilho, Tintilla, Tintilla De Rota, Tintillo, Tintillo Alicante, Tinto, Torrentes, Uva Cagnelata, Verdadero, Xeres, Xerez, Zinzillosa.	Spain			
Bracciola Nera		Barciuola, Bracciola, Bracciula, Bracciuola, Braciola, Braciuola, Brassola, Brassora, Brazolata, Rappalunga.	Italy, Liguria			1600
Brachetto del Piemonte		Brachetto, Borgogna, Bracchetto, Bracelet, Brachet De Nice, Brachetto D' Acqui, Brachetto D'Alexandrie, Brachetto Di Acqui, Brachetto Di Montabone, Brachetto Du Piemont, Braquet Des Jardins, Calitor, Moscato Nero.	Italy, Piedmont			
Brancellao		Alvarelhao, Albarello, Alvaralhao, Alvarelhao De Pe Branco, Alvarelhao De Vara Branca, Alvarelho, Alvarellao, Alvarello, Alvarello Gallego, Alvarelo, Alvarelyo, Avarilhao, Brancelhao, Brancelho, Brancello, Brencellao, Broncellao, Locaia, Pilongo, Pirrauvo, Pirruivo, Serradelo, Serradillo, Uva Gallega, Uva Negra, Varancelha, Verancelha.	Portugal			
Braquet Noir		Brachet, Brachetto, Bracke, Braquet, Bruquet, Calito Du Languedoc, Canseron.	France			1783
Brugnola			Italy, Lombardy			
Brujidera		Marufo, Abrunhal, Barrete De Padre, Brujidero, Brujiguero, Colgadera, Crujideiro, Crujidera, Crujidero Di Spagna, Falso Mourisco, Lagrima Noir, Lamego, Lobo, Malvasia, Marouco, Marufa, Marufo Roxo, Marujo, Moravia Dulce, Morisco Tinto, Moroco, Mourico, Mourisca, Mourisco, Mourisco Du Douro, Mourisco Nos Vinhos Verdes, Mourisco Preto, Mourisco Roxo, Mourisco Tinto, Olho De Rei, Rucial, Tinta Amarela Grossa, Tinta Do Caramelo, Tinta Grossa, Trujidera, Trujidero, Uva De Rei, Uva Rei.	Portugal			
Brun Argenté		Arzhente, Bakarezo, Bryun, Camarese, Camareze, Camarezo, Cameres Du Gard, Kamaredyu Gard, Kamarez, Madeleine, Vacarese, Vacareze Blanc, Vaccarese, Vaccareso, Vaccareze, Vakarez.	France			
Brun Fourca		Brun D'Aureol, Brun D'Auriol, Brun De Farnous, Brun Farnous, Brun Fourcat, Brun Tourcae, Brunfourka, Caula, Caula Noir De Vaucluse, Farnous, Floura, Flouron, Gros Taulier, Manconnet, Morrastel Fleuri, Morrastel Flourat, Moulan, Moulard, Moulau, Mourastel Flourat, Moureau, Mourrastel Fleuri, Mourrastel Floura, Mourrastel Flourat, Mouzeau, Mulon, Plant De Bordeaux, Plant Francais, Tinto Gallego.	France, Palette AOC	Pougayen × Best's R2 V73		
Brunal		Alfrocheiro, Albarin Frances, Albarin Negrin, Albarin Negro, Albarin Tinto, Albarinon, Alfrocheiro Preto, Alfrucheiro, Alfurcheiro, Baboso Negro, Bastardo Negro, Caino Gordo, Tinta Bastardinha, Tinta Francesa De Viseu, Tinta Francisca De Viseu, Tinto Serodo	Portugal			
Brunello		Sangiovese, Brunelletto, Brunello Di Montalcino, Calabrese, Cardisco, Chiantino, Cordisio, Cuocignola, Gabba Cani, Guarnacciola, Ingannacane, Lacrima, Lakhdari, Lambrusco, Lambrusco Mendoza, Maglioppa, Montepulciano, Montepulciano Primutico, Morellino, Morellino De Florence, Morellino Di Scansano, Morellone, Moscatale, Moscatele, Negretta, Nerino, Nerino Sanvicetro, Niella, Nielluccia, Nielluccio, Niellucciu, Pigniuolo Rosso, Pignolo, Pignolo Rosso, Pignuolo, Plant Romain, Primaticcio, Prugnolino Dolce, Prugnolo, Prugnolo Di Montepulciano, Prugnolo Dolce, Prugnolo Gentile, Prugnolo Gentile Di Montepulciano, Prugnolo Rosso, San Gioveto Grosso, San Montanino, San Quioveto, San Roveto, San Zoveto, Sancivetro, Sangineto, Sangiogheto, Sangiovese Crni, Sangiovese Dal Cannello Lungo, Sangiovese Dal Cannello Lungo Di Predappio, Sangiovese Di Lamole, Sangiovese Di Romagna, Sangiovese Dolce, Sangiovese Elba, Sangiovese Gentile, Sangiovese Grosso, Sangiovese Nostrano, Sangiovese Piccolo, Sangiovese Piccolo Precoce, Sangiovese Romagnolo, Sangiovese Toscano, Sangiovete, Sangioveto, Sangioveto Dell'Elba, Sangioveto Dolce, Sangioveto Grosso, Sangioveto Montanino, Sanvincetro, Sanxhoveze, Sanzoveto, Tabernello, Tignolo, Tignolo Sointovese, Tipsa, Toustain, Uva Abruzzi, Uva Canina, Uvetta	Italy			
Bubbierasco			Italy, Piedmont	Nebbiolo × Bianchetto Di Saluzzo		
Buket		Bouquet, Bouket	Bulgaria	Mavroud × Pinot Noir		
Busuioaca de Bohotin		Muscat A Petits Grains Noirs, Black Frontignan, Busuioaca, Busuioaca De Bohotin, Busuioaca Roza De Bohotin, Busuoaca Neagra, Caillaba, Caillaba Noir, Cayabe, Caylor Noir Musque, Cerni Muskat, Fekete Muskotally, Frontignan Black, Frontignan Rot, Gaillaba, Gara Muscat, Gara Muskat, Jura Black Muscat, Kajyaba, Kayyaba, Mor Muscateller, Moscatel Galego, Moscatel Negro, Moscatel Tinto, Moscateller Nigra, Moscatello Nero, Moscato Greco Nero, Moscato Nero, Moschato Mavro, Muscat Caillaba, Muscat Calyaba, Muscat D'Eisenstadt, Muscat De Yura, Muscat Du Jura, Muscat Gaillaba, Muscat Kaillaba, Muscat Mavro, Muscat Modry, Muscat Nero De Spania, Muscat Noir, Muscat Noir A Petits Grains, Muscat Noir D'Eisenstadt, Muscat Noir Du Jura, Muscat Noir Ordinaire, Muscat Rouge, Muscat Violet, Muscat Violet De Madeira, Muscat Zerni, Muscateller, Muskat Cerni, Muskat Chernyi, Muskat Chernyi Kalyabskii, Muskat Kalyaba, Muskat Modry, Muskat Modry Malozrnny, Muskateller Blau, Muskateller Grau, Muskateller Schwarz, Muskateller Schwarzblau, Muskotally Kek, Noir De Thyra, Qara Muskat, Rother Frontignan, Schmeckende Schwarz, Schwarze Schmeckende, Schwarzer Muskateller, Schwarzer Weihrauch, Tamaioasa Vanata De Bohotin, Weihrauch Schwarz.	Romania		100	
Caberinta		Gargiulo	Argentina	Ruby × Ruby Cabernet		
Cabernet Carbon		Freiburg	Germany	Cabernet Sauvignon × Bronner		1983
Cabernet Carol		Freiburg	Germany	Cabernet Sauvignon × Solaris		1982
Cabernet Colonjes		Valentin Blattner	Switzerland	Cabernet Sauvignon × ? (fungus resistant variety)		
Cabernet Cortis		Freiburg	Germany	Cabernet Sauvignon × Solaris		1982
Cabernet Cubin		Weinsberg	Germany	Limberger Blau × Cabernet Sauvignon		1970
Cabernet Dorio		Weinsberg	Germany	Blauer Limberger × Dornfelder		1971
Cabernet Dorsa		Weinsberg	Germany	Blauer Limberger × Dornfelder		1971
Cabernet Franc		Acheria, Ardounet, Aroia, Arrouya, Auxquels, Baro, Beron, Bidure, Bordeaux, Bordo, Bordo Magher, Boubet, Bouchet, Bouchet Franc, Bouchet Saint-Emilion, Bouchy, Breton, Burdeas Tinto, Cabernet, Cabernet Aunis, Cabernet Bresciano, Cabernet D'Aunis, Cabernet Franc Blauer, Cabernet Franc Crni, Cabernet Franc Nero, Cabernet Franc Noir, Cabernet Francese, Cabernet Franco, Cabernet Frank, Cabernet Gris, Cabonet, Cabrunet, Capbreton, Capbreton Rouge, Carbenet, Carbonet, Carbouet, Carmene, Carmenet, Carmenet Grand, Carne Fran, Couahort, Crouchen Negre, Crouchen Noir, Fer Servadou, Fer Servandou, Gamput, Gro Kaberne, Gro Vidyur, Gro Vidyuz, Gros Bouchet, Gros Bouschet, Gros Caberne, Gros Cabernet, Gros Vidure, Gros Vidyuz, Grosse Vidure, Hartling, Kaberne, Kaberne Fran, Kaberne Frank, Kabernet Frank Breton, Karmene, Messanges, Messanges Rouge, Morenoa Veron Bouchy, Noir Dur, Petit Fer, Petit Viodure, Petite Vidure, Petite Vignedure, Plan Des Sables, Plant Breton, Plant De L'Abbe Breton, Qro Kaberne, Qro Vidyuz, Sable Rouge, Trouchet, Trouchet Noir, Tsapournako, Verdejilla Tinto, Veron, Veron Bouchy, Veronais, Vidure, Vuidure.	France, Loire Valley		36,000 (France), 7,000 (Italy), 1,400 (United States), 210 (New Zealand), 1,000 (South Africa), 1,180 (Chile), 300 (Argentina)	
Cabernet Gernischt		Carmenere, Bordo, Bouton Blanc, Caberne Karmener, Cabernella, Cabernelle, Cabernet, Cabernet Carmenere, Cabernet Cosmo, Cabernet Gernicht, Cabernet Gernischet, Cabernet Gerniseht, Cabernet Grande, Cabernet Grosso, Cabernet Italico, Cabernet Shelongzhu, Carbonet, Carbouet, Caremenelle, Carmenea, Carmenegre, Carmenelle, Carmeneyre, Gran Vidyur, Grand Carmenet, Grand Vidure, Grande Vidure, Grande Vuidure, Grosse Vidure, Kaberne, Kaberne Karmener, Kabernel, Karmene, Karmensel, Uva Francesca.	France	Moural × Cabernet Franc		1892
Cabernet Jura		Valentin Blattner	Switzerland	Cabernet Sauvignon × ? (fungus resistant variety)		
Cabernet Mitos		Weinsberg	Germany, Württemberg (wine region)	Blaufraenkisch × Teinturier	317 (Germany 2006)	1970
Cabernet Moravia			Czech Republic	Cabernet Franc × Zweigeltrebe		1981
Cabernet Pfeffer		Pfeffer Cabernet	United States			1905
Cabernet Sauvignon		Bidure, Bordaoux, Bordeaux, Bordo, Bouche, Bouchet, Bouchet Sauvignon, Bourdeos Tinto, Bouschet Sauvignon, Breton, Burdeos Tinto, Cabarnet Sauvignon, Caberne, Caberne Sovinion, Cabernet Petit, Cabernet Piccolo, Cabernet Sauvignon Black, Cabernet Sauvignon Blauer, Cabernet Sauvignon Cl. R5, Cabernet Sauvignon Crni, Cabernet Sauvignon Nero, Cabernet Sauvignon Noir, Cabernet Sauvignon Petit, Carbonet, Carbouet, Carmenet, Castet, Dzanati, Enfin, Epicier Noir, Kaberne Sovinjon, Kaberne Sovinon, Kaberne Sovinyon, Kabernet Suvinjon, Lafet, Lafit, Lafite, Marchoupet, Melkii Chernyi, Menut, Navarre, Petit Bouchet, Petit Bouschet, Petit Cabernet, Petit Cavernet Sauvignon, Petit Vidure, Petit-Bouchet, Petite Parde, Petite Vidure, Sauvignon, Sauvignon Rouge, Sauvignonne, Vaucluse, Veron, Vidure, Vidure Petite, Vidure Sauvignon, Vidure Sauvignonne.	France	Cabernet Franc × Sauvignon Blanc	262,000 (2004)	17th century
Cabernet Severny		Kaberne Severnyi, Cabernet Severny, Cabernet Severnyi, Cabernet Szevernuej, Kaberne Severnyi	Russia	Galan × Amurensis		1978
Cabertin				Cabernet Sauvignon × ? (fungus resistant variety)		1991
Caddiu		Caddeo, Caddiu Nieddu, Caddu, Niedda, Niedda Perda Serra, Perda, Serra.	Italy, Sicily			1897
Cagnulari		Graciano, Alicante, Bastardo Nero, Bois Dur, Bordelais, Bovale, Bovale Piccolo, Bovale Piticco, Bovale Sardo, Bovaleddo, Bovaleddu, Bovali Mannu, Bualeddu, Cadelanisca, Cagliunari, Cagniulari, Cagnolari Nero, Cagnonale, Cagnorali Nero, Cagnovali, Cagnovali Nero, Cagnulari, Cagnulari Bastardo, Cagnulari Sardo, Cagnulatu, Calda Reio, Caldareddhu, Caldareddu, Caldarello, Cardanissia, Cardinissia, Cargo Muol, Carrixa, Casca, Cendron, Charge Mulet, Courouillade, Couthurier, Couturier, Drug, Enfarine, Graciana, Graciano 15–5, Graciano Tinto, Gros Negrette, Grosse Negrette, Himrisnky, Jerusano, Karis, Marastel, Maristeddo, Matarou, Materou, Minostello, Minustello, Minustellu, Minustillu, Monastel, Monasteou, Monaster, Monastrel, Monastrell Menudo, Monastrell Verdadero, Monestaou, Monestel, Moraiola Minore, Morastel, Morastell, Morestel, Moristell, Morrastel, Morrastel Tantot, Moura, Mourastel, Mouroustel, Mourrastel, Murastellu, Muristeddo, Muristeddu, Muristellu, Negrette De Montauban, Negrette De Pays, Nieddu Prunizza, Perpignan, Perpignanou Bois Dur, Perpigne, Plant De Ledenon, Tanat Gris, Tannat Bordelais, Tannat Gris, Tinta, Tinta De Fontes, Tinta Do Padre Antonio, Tinta Fontes, Tinta Mencida, Tinta Menuda, Tinta Miuda, Tinta Miuda De Fontes, Tintilho, Tintilla, Tintilla De Rota, Tintillo, Tintillo Alicante, Tinto, Torrentes, Uva Cagnelata, Verdadero, Xeres, Xerez, Zinzillosa.	Spain, Rioja		395	
Caino Bravo		Amaral, Amaral Preto, Azal, Azal Preto, Azal Tinto, Azar, Cachon, Cainho Miudo, Caino, Caino Bravo, Caino Tinto, Cainzinho, Sousao, Sousao Galego.	Portugal			
Caiño Tinto		Borracal Azedo, Bagalhal, Bogalhal, Borraco, Borrasao, Bougalhal, Bovvaco, Cachino, Cainho Gordo, Cainho Grande, Cainho Grosso, Caino Del Pais, Caino Gordo, Caino Redondo, Esfarrapa, Esfarrapas, Espadeiro Redondo, Morraca, Murracal, Oil De Chapaud, Olho De Sapo, Tinta Femia, Tinta Femia De Aldan, Tinto Redondo.	Portugal			
Calabrese		Alba De Calabria, Calabrese Cappuciu Nero, Calabrese D'Avola, Calabrese De Calabria, Calabrese Di Noto, Calabrese Dolce, Calabrese Nero, Calabrese Pittatello, Calabrese Pizuto, Calabrese Pizzutello, Calabrese Pizzutello Con La Foglia Rotonda, Calabrese Pizzuto, Calabreser Weiss, Calabria, Calabriai Fekete, Calabrisi D'Avola, Fekete Calabriai, Kalabriai Fekete, Nero D'Avola, Raisin De Calibre Noir, Strugeri De Calabria, Uva De Calabria.	Italy			
Calabrese di Montenuovo		Calabrese Montenuovo, Nero D'Avola, Sangiovese.	Italy			
Caladoc		Caladok, Kaladok.	France, Languedoc	Grenache × Cot		1958
Calandro		Geilweilerhof	Germany	Domina × Regent		1984
Calitor Noir		Anglas, Assadoule Bouvier, Binxeilla, Blavette, Calitor, Canseron, Cargo Miola, Cargo Muou, Catitor, Causeron, Causeroun, Charge Mulet, Col Tor, Colitor, Coulitor, Coytor, Dameron Des Vosges, Foirard, Foirat, Fouiraire, Fouiral, Fouirassan, Garriga, Marounvern, Mouillas, Noeuds-Courts, Nou Courte, Pampoul, Pecoui Touar, Pecoui Tovar, Picpoul De Fronton, Picpoule Sorbier, Piquepoul De Fronton, Pride Of Australia, Qualitor, Ramonen, Rouget De Salins, Rousselin, Rousselin Noir, Rousset, Rouxal, Sang De Boeuf, Saure, Sen Zhan, Siege Noir, Sigotier, Sigoyer, Tentyure Artekskii, Touar	France, Provence wine			1600
Çalkarası		Çal Karası	Turkey			
Callet			Spain	Callet Cas Concos × Fogoneu		1892
Caloria			Italy, Tuscany			1965
Camaraou Noir		Caino Redondo, Camaralet Noir, Camaran, Camaras, Camarau, Camaraue Rouge, Couxo, Gros Noir, Kamarau, Mehrfarbiger Camarau, Moustardet, Plant Sauvage, Sparse Menue.	France			1900s
Camarate		Camarate Tinto, Bairrada, Caccalho, Cascalho, Casculho, Castelao, Castelao Da Bairrada, Castelao De Nosso, Castelao Do Nosso, Castelao Nacional, Castelao Nosso, Maroto, Morete, Moreto, Moreto De Soure, Moreto Do Douro, Mortagua, Mortagua De Vide Preta, Mouro Negro, Mureto, Negro Mouro, Negru Mouro.	Portugal	Cayetana blanca × Alfrocheiro Preto	1712	
Camarese		Brun Argente, Arzhente, Bakarezo, Bryun, Camarese, Camareze, Camarezo, Cameres Du Gard, Kamaredyu Gard, Kamarez, Madeleine, Vacarese, Vacareze Blanc, Vaccarese, Vaccareso, Vaccareze, Vakarez	France			1538
Campbell Early		Campbell, Campbell's Early, Champbell Early, Early Campbell, Island Belle	United States	Moore Early × (Belvidere × Muscat Hamburg)		1890
Canaiolo Nero		Caccione Nero, Cacciuna Nera, Cagnina, Calabrese, Canaiola, Canaiolo, Canaiolo Borghese, Canaiolo Cascolo, Canaiolo Colore, Canaiolo Grosso, Canaiolo Nero A Raspo Rosso, Canaiolo Nero Comune, Canaiolo Nero Grosso, Canaiolo Nero Minuto, Canaiolo Pratese, Canaiolo Romano, Canaiolo Rosso Piccolo, Canaiolo Toscano, Canaiuola, Canaiuolo, Canajola Lastri, Canajolo, Canajolo Lastri, Canajolo Nero Grosso, Canajolo Piccolo, Canajuola, Canajuolo Nero Comune, Canina, Cannaiola, Cannaiola Di Marta, Cannaiola Macchie Di Marta, Cannajola, Colore, Colore Canino, San Giovese, Tindillaro, Tindilloro, Uva Canaiolo, Uva Canajola, Uva Canajuola, Uva Canina, Uva Colore Canaiola, Uva Dei Cani, Uva Donna, Uva Fosca, Uva Grossa, Uva Marchigiana, Uva Merla, Vitis Vinifera Etrusca.	Italy, Tuscan wine		3,000 (2006)	
Canari Noir		Balza, Batista, Blanchette Rouge, Blanquette Rouge, Boudales, Bourgogne, Caillaba, Canari, Canaril, Canarill, Carcasses, Cargo Nalt, Cargonalt, Chalosse Noire, Cot A Queue Verte, Cot Vert Du Saumurois, Cotes Vertes, Enfin, Errone De Grolleau, Esquisse Braguette, Folle Noir De La Vienne, Folle Noire, Gamay De Malain, Gamay Malain, Grosse Negrette, Luverdon, Oeil De Chope, Ondane, Ondenc Noir, Pinot Gris, Pinot Gris Mendoza, Saint Helene, Sainte-Helene, Semis Rouge, Ugne Noir, Ugne Noire.	France			
Canina Nera		Canena, Canina, Canina Crossa, Canina Dal Raspo, Canina Di Forli, Canina Di Lugo, Canina Di Ravenna, Canina Picola Lunga, Cannina, Uva Canina.	Italy, Emilia-Romagna			
Cannamela			Italy			
Carcajolo Nero		Parraleta, Bariadorgia, Bastardo, Bombedra, Bomogastro, Bomvedro, Bonifacienco, Bonifazino, Bonvedro, Bunifazinu, Cacagliola, Carcaghjoliu Neru, Carcaghjolu Neru, Carcagiola, Carcajiola, Carcajola Noir, Carcajolo, Carcajolo Nero, Carcajolo Noir, Cargajola, Caricagiola, Espagnin, Espagnin Noir, False Carignan, Lambrusco De Alentejo, Marota, Monvedro, Monvedro (Oeste), Monvedro De Sines, Monvedro Tinto, Morteira, Murteira, Paraletta, Parralada, Parraleta, Parreleta, Pau Ferro, Ribote, Ribote, Salceno Negro, Tinta Caiada, Tinta Da Lameira, Tinta Do Lameiro, Tinta Lameira, Tinta Murteira, Tintorro, Torres D'Algarve.	Italy, Sardinia			
Caricagiola		Bonifaccenco, Bonifacenco, Bonifacengo, Bonifazina, Bonifazino, Carajolo Noir, Carcaghjolu, Carcagiola, Carcajola, Cargajola, Caricagliola, Carjcagiola, Carricadolza, Garricadolza	Italy			
Carignan		Carignan Noir, Axina De Spagna, Babonenc, Babounenc, Blaue Shopatna, Blaue Sopatna, Blauer Carignan, Blauer Carignant, Boi Dur, Bois De Fer, Bois Dur, Bois Dure, Bovale Grande, Bovale Grande Di Spagna, Bove Duro, Bove Duro Di Spagna, Cafalan, Cagnolaro, Cagnolaro Tinto, Calignan, Carignan Crni, Carignan Frances, Carignan Mouillan, Carignane, Carignane Mouilla, Carignane Noir, Carignane Noire, Carignane Violette, Carignanne, Carignano, Carignano Di Carmignano, Carignena, Carinena, Carinena Mazuela, Carinena Negra, Catalan, Cencibel, Crignane, Crinana, Crujillon, Crusillo, Girard, Girarde, Grenache Du Bois, Grenache Du Bois Dur, Karignan, Karinian, Karinjan, Karinyan, Kek Carignan, Legno Duro, Legno Duro Di Portoferraio, Manuelo Tinto, Manzuela, Marocain, Mataro, Mazuela, Mazuelo, Mollard, Monestel, Mounesteou, Pinot D'Evora, Pinot Evara, Plant D'Espagne, Plant De Ledenon, Pokovec, Pokovez, Roussillonen, Samso, Samso Crusillo, Sanso, Sopatna Blau, Tinto Mazuela, Uva Di Spagna.	Spain, Zaragoza		95,700 (EU 2006)	
Carinena		Carignan Noir, Axina De Spagna, Babonenc, Babounenc, Blaue Shopatna, Blaue Sopatna, Blauer Carignan, Blauer Carignant, Boi Dur, Bois De Fer, Bois Dur, Bois Dure, Bovale Grande, Bovale Grande Di Spagna, Bove Duro, Bove Duro Di Spagna, Cafalan, Cagnolaro, Cagnolaro Tinto, Calignan, Carignan, Carignan Crni, Carignan Frances, Carignan Mouillan, Carignane, Carignane Mouilla, Carignane Noir, Carignane Noire, Carignane Violette, Carignanne, Carignano, Carignano Di Carmignano, Carignena, Carinena, Carinena Mazuela, Carinena Negra, Catalan, Cencibel, Crignane, Crinana, Crujillon, Crusillo, Girard, Girarde, Grenache Du Bois, Grenache Du Bois Dur, Karignan, Karinian, Karinjan, Karinyan, Kek Carignan, Legno Duro, Legno Duro Di Portoferraio, Manuelo Tinto, Manzuela, Marocain, Mataro, Mazuela, Mazuelo, Mollard, Monestel, Mounesteou, Pinot D'Evora, Pinot Evara, Plant D'Espagne, Plant De Ledenon, Pokovec, Pokovez, Roussillonen, Samso, Samso Crusillo, Sanso, Sopatna Blau, Tinto Mazuela, Uva Di Spagna.	France			
Carménère		Bordo, Bouton Blanc, Caberne Karmener, Cabernella, Cabernelle, Cabernet, Cabernet Carmenere, Cabernet Cosmo, Cabernet Gernicht, Cabernet Gernischet, Cabernet Gernischt, Cabernet Gerniseht, Cabernet Grande, Cabernet Grosso, Cabernet Italico, Cabernet Shelongzhu, Carbonet, Carbouet, Caremenelle, Carmenea, Carmenegre, Carmenelle, Carmeneyre, Gran Vidyur, Grand Carmenet, Grand Vidure, Grande Vidure, Grande Vuidure, Grosse Vidure, Kaberne, Kaberne Karmener, Kabernel, Karmene, Karmensel, Uva Francesca	France, Médoc		8,800 (Chile 2009)	1850s
Carmine			United States	(Carignan × Cabernet Sauvignon) × Merlot		1946
Carminoir			Switzerland	Pinot Noir × Cabernet Sauvignon		1982
Carnelian			US, California	(Carignan × Cabernet Sauvignon) × Grenache		1972
Carrasquin		Carrasco, Carrasco Negro	Spain			1000s
Carricante		Catanese Bianco, Catarratto alla porta bianca di Sicilia	Italy, Sicily			1774
Casavecchia			Italy			1890s
Cascade		Seibel	France	Seibel 7042 × Seibel 5409		1938
Casculho		Cascudo	Portugal			
Casetta		Lambrusco A Foglia Tonda, Lambrusco Casetta, Maranela.	Italy			<1000s
Castagnara		Castgnarella, S. Maria, Santa Maria, Santa Maria Nera, Sarnese, Scassacaretta Nera.	Italy			1800s
Castelão		Bastardo Castico, Bastardo Espanhol, Castelana, Castelao Frances, Castelao Real, Casteleao, Castellam, Castellao, Castellao Portugues, Castico, Joao De Periquita, Joao De Santarem, Joao De Santarem Tinto, Joao Mendes, Joao Pinto Mendes, Joao Santarem, Lariao Preto, Mortagua, Mortagua De Vide Branca, Olho De Lebre, Perikvita, Periquita, Piriquita, Piriquito, Pirriquita, Santarem, Santarem Tinto.	Portugal	Cayetana blanca × Alfrocheiro Preto		1531
Castets		Castet, Engrunat, Gros Machouquet, Gros Verdau, Machoupet, Machouquet, Matioupet, Matiouquet, Nicouleau.	France, Aveyron	Gros Cabernet × Camaraou Noir	nearly extinct	1870s
Castiglione		Alicante Barletta, Castigliono, Castigliono Nero, Mantonico Nero, Marchesana, Sagarese, Zagarese, Zagarese Nero, Zagarolese, Zuccheio Canella, Zucchero E Cannella, Zucchero Et Cannella.	Italy			
Catalanesca		Catalensca Nera, Katalaneska.	Italy			
Catanese Nero		Kaleo, Vespalora, Vesparola	Italy, Sicily		80 (2000)	
Cavrara		Bassanese Dal Peduncolo Rosso, Caprara, Cavarada, Cavarara.	Italy			
Centesimino		Alicante Del Faentino, Sauvignon Rosso, Savignon Rosso.	Italy			
Centurion		Centurion	US, California	(Carignan × Cabernet Sauvignon) × Grenache		1975
Cereza		Ceresa, Ceresina, Cereza Italiana, Cerise, Chereza.		Muscat Of Alexandria × Listan Prieto		
Cesanese		Cesanese Comune, Bambino, Bombino Nero, Bonvino Nero, Cesanese, Cesanese Ad Acino Grosso, Cesanese Di Affile, Cesanese Velletrano, Cezanese Nero, Ferrigno Nero, Mangiatoria, Nero Ferrigno, Sancinella, Sanginella, Sanguinella, Uva Di Affile.	Italy, Lazio		1,000 (2006)	1479
César		Ceear, Ceelar, Celar, Gros Monsieur, Gros Noir, Picargneau, Picargniol, Picargniot, Picarniau, Picorneau, Roemer, Romain, Romano, Roncain.	France, Burgundy wine	Pinot × Argant		50 BCE
Cevat Kara		Dzhevat Kara, Cevat Kara, Djevat Kara, Dshevat Kara, Jewath, Polkovnik Kara.	Ukraine			1928
Chambourcin		Joanneseyve, Chambourcine, J.S., Joannes Seyve, John Saym, Shambursen, Zhoan Seiv.	France	Seyve Villard × Seibel		
Charbono		France: Corbeau, Alcantino, Aleante, Bathiolin, Batiolin, Blaue Gansfuesser, Bonarda, Bourdon Noir, Carbonneau, Charbonneau, Charbono, Corbeau, Corbeau Noir, Cot Merille, Cot Rouge Merille, Cote Rouge, Dolcetto Grosso, Dolutz, Douce Noire, Folle Noire D L'Ariege, Gansfuesser Blaue, Grenoblois, Korbo, Mauvais Noir, Ocanette, Picot Rouge, Plant De Calarin, Plant De Montmelian, Plant De Montmelion, Plant De Savoie, Plant De Turin, Plant Noir, Serbina, Sevilhao, Turca, Turin, Turino. Italy: Acqui, Barbirono, Bathiolin, Batialin, Beina, Bignola, Bignona, Bignonia, Bignonina, Bourdon Noir, Cassolo, Charbonneau, Charbono, Chasselas Noir, Cote Rouge Merille, Crete De Coq, Debili Rifosk, Dolcedo Rotstieliger, Dolceto, Dolcetta Nera, Dolcetto A Raspe Verde, Dolcetto A Raspo Rosso, Dolcetto Crni, Dolcetto Nero, Dolcetto Piemontese, Dolchetto, Dolcino Nero, Dolciut, Dolsin, Dolsin Raro, Dolzin, Dolzino, Dosset, Gros Noir De Montelimar, Gros Plant, Maennlicher Refosco, Mauvais Noir, Montelimar, Monteuse, Montmelian, Mosciolino, Nera Dolce, Nibieu, Nibio, Noirin D'Espagne, Nord Du Lot Et Garonne, Ocanette, Orincasca, Ormeasca, Ormeasco, Picot Rouge, Plant De Calarin, Plant De Chapareillan, Plant De Moirans, Plant De Montmelian, Plant De Provence, Plant De Savoie, Plant De Turin, Plant Du Roi, Premasto, Primaticcio, Promotico, Provençal, Ravanellino, Refork, Refork Debeli, Refork Male, Refosk Debeli, Rotstieliger Dolcedo, Savoyard, Turin, Turino, Uva D'Acqui, Uva D'Acquia, Uva Del Monferrato, Uva Di Ovada, Uva Di Roccagrimalda.	France, Italy			
Chancellor			France	Seibel 5163 × Seibel 880		
Charentsi			Armenia	(Amurensis × Zhemchug Saba) × Karmrayut		
Chatus		Bolgnino, Bourgnin, Brachet, Brunetta, Burgnin, Carbesse, Chanu, Chany, Charagnot, Charamiot, Chatelos, Chatelus, Chatos, Chatut, Chenu, Corbeil, Corbel, Corbelle, Corbes, Corbesse, Courbet, Gros Chenu, Houron, Korbel, Korbess, Mauvais Noir, Mouraud, Mouret, Mourre, Nebbiolo Di Dronero, Nebbiolo Dronero, Nebbiolo Pairole, Neiret, Neiret Pinerolese, Neretto, Ouron, Persagne Gamay, Scarlattin, Shatu, Shenyu, Siramuse, Syramhuse, Syramuse, Ver Shenyu, Vert Chenu.	France			
Chelois			France	Seibel 5163 × Seibel 5593		
Chenanson		Chenancon, Chenason, Pineau Gros, Shenanson, Vaalblaar Stein.	France	Grenache Noir × Jurancon Noir		
Chichaud		Brunet, Chicaud, Chichaud Noir, Cico, Tsintsao, Tsintsau	France			
Chidiriotiko		Kalloniatiko	Greece			
Chisago			United States	St. Croix × Swenson Red		
Chkhaveri		Chhaveri, Chkhaveli, Chkhavery, Cxaveri, Riqintuli, Samchkhavera, Tchkhaveli, Tchkhaveri, Tsivtchkhavera.	Georgia			
Chondromavro		Chondromavrouda, Chondromavroudi, Chondromavroudo, Khondromavroud, Khondromavroudi.	Greece			
Cianorie		Canore, Canorie, Chianorie, Cianoria, Cjanorie, Rossarie, Vinosa.	Italy			
Cienna			Australia	Sumoll × Cabernet Sauvignon		1972
Ciliegiolo		Albana Nera, Aleatico Di Spagna, Brunellone, Canaiolo Romano, Ciliegino, Ciliegiolo Di Spagna, Ciliegiolo Nero, Ciliegiona Nera, Ciliegioulo Nero, Ciliegiulo, Ciliegiuolo, Ciligiolo Nero, Ciriegiuolo Dolce, Criminese, Mazzese, Riminese, Riminese Ad Uva Rossa, Riminese Di Color Rubino Di Potercole, Riminese Nero, Riminese Noire, Sangiovese Polveroso, Sangiovese Polveroso Bonechi.	Italy	Moscato Violetto × Sangiovese	5,000 (2006)	
Cinsaut		Black Malvoisie, Black Prince, Blue Imperial, Boudales, Bourdales, Bourdales Kek, Bourdelas, Budales, Calibre, Chainette, Cincout, Cing-Saou, Cinq-Sao, Cinq-Saou, Cinq-Saut, Cinqsaut, Cinquien, Cinsanet, Cinsault, Cinsaut Couche, Cubilier, Cubillier, Cuviller, Cuvillier, Espagne, Espagnen, Espagnin Noir, Espagnol, Froutignan, Grappu De La Dordogne, Grecau, Grecu Masculinu, Gros De Lacaze, Gros Marocain, Hermitage, Imperial Blue, Kara, Kara Takopoulo, Madiran, Madiran Du Portugal, Malaga, Malaga Kek, Malvoise, Marocain, Marroquin, Marrouquin, Maurange, Mavro Kara, Mavro Kara Melkii, Milhau, Milhaud Du Pradel, Morterille, Morterille Noire, Moustardier Noir, Navarro, Negru De Sarichioi, Oeillade, Oeillade Noir, Ottavianello, Ottaviano, Ottavianuccia, Ottavinello, Pampous, Papadou, Passerille, Passerille Senso, Pedaire, Petaire, Picardan, Picardan Noir, Piede Di Colombo, Piede Di Palumbo, Piede Rosso, Piqepoul, Piquepoul D'Uzes, Pis De Chevre, Pis De Chevre Rouge, Plant D Arles Boudales, Plant D'Arles, Plant De Broqui, Plant De Broquies, Poupe De Crabe, Poupo De Crabe, Poupo De Crabo, Pousse De Chevre, Pousse De Chevre Rouge, Prunaley, Prunelard, Prunelas, Prunelat, Prunella, Prunellas, Prunellas Noir, S. Saul, Salerne, Samso, Samson, Sao Saul, Senso, Sensu, Sinseur, Sinso, Sinson, Strum, Takopulo Kara, Ulliade, Ulliaou, Uva Spina, West'S White Prolific.	France, Languedoc-Roussillon			
Colombana nera			Italy, Tuscany and Emilia-Romagna			
Colorino			Italy, Tuscany			
Complexa			Portugal			1960s
Cornalin see Rouge du Pays			Switzerland, Valais		116 (2009)	
Cornifesto			Portugal			
Corvina / Corvinone			Italy, Veneto wine			
Counoise			France, Rhône wine		638 (2006)	
Croatina			Italy, Lombardia (wine)			
Darnekuša			Croatia, Hvar			
Dobričić			Croatia, Šolta			
Dolcetto			Italy, Piedmont			
Domina			Germany, Palatinate (wine region)			1927
Dornfelder			Germany, Württemberg (wine region)		8,231 (2006)	1955
Douce Noir		Charbono, Bonarda, Turca	France, Savoy wine, California, Argentina			
Douce Noire grise			France			
Dunkelfelder			Germany		372 (2006)	1930s
Duras			France, Tarn (river)			
Dureza			France, Ardèche			
Durif / Petite Sirah			France, Montpellier		300 (Australia),	
Ederena			France	Merlot × Abouriou		1952
Enfariné noir			France, Jura			
Espadeiro			Portugal, Minho VR			
Étraire			France, Rhone, Savoy			
Fer			France, South West France (wine region)			
Ferrón			Spain, Galicia			
Fetească neagră			Romania			
Forcallat tinta			Spain, Castile-La Mancha			
Fortana			Italy, Emilia-Romagna			
Frappato			Italy, Sicily			
Freisa			Italy, Piedmont			
Frühroter Veltliner		Malvasia, Malvasier, Frühroter Malvasier, Roter Malvasier	Austria, Weinviertel			
Fumin			Italy, Valle d'Aosta DOC			
Gaglioppo			Italy, Calabria			
Gamashara			Azerbaijan			
Gamay / Gamay noir			France, Loire valley			
Gamaret			Switzerland			1970
Garanoir			Switzerland		203 (2009)	1970
Garnatxa / Grenache / Garnacha / Cannonau /Lladoner Pelut / Lledoner Pelut			Spain		82,300 (Spain), 95,700 (France),	
Garró		Barillol, Galmeta, Galmete, Mandó, Mandón, Morenillo, Valenciana Tinta	Spain			
Ġellewża		Gelleuza	Malta			
Girò			Italy, Sardinia		552	
Gouget noir			France			
Graciano		Bastardo Nero, Bois Dur, Bordelais, Cagliunari, Cagnonale, Cagnovali Nero, Cagnulari, Cagnulari Bastardo, Cagnulari Sardo, Cagnulatu, Caldareddu, Caldarello, Cargo Muol, Courouillade, Courouillade, Couthurier, Drug, Graciana, Graciano Tinto, Grosse Negrette, Jerusano, Karis, Marastel, Matarou, Minostello, Minustello, Monastel, Monestaou, Morastel, Morestel, Morrastel, Mourastel, Perpignan, Perpignanou Bois Dur, Plant De Ledenon, Tinta Do Padre Antonio, Tinta Miuda, Tintilla, Uva Cagnelata, Xeres, Xerez, Zinzillosa, Cendrón, Tanat Gris, Tintilla de Rota.	Spain, Rioja		395 (Spain)	
Grand noir de la Calmette			France			
Grisa nera			Italy, Piedmont			
Greco nero			Italy		3,200	
Grignolino			Italy, Piedmont			
Gropello			Italy, Lombardia (wine)			
Grolleau / Groslot			France, Loire valley		5,500	
Gros Verdot			France, Gironde			
Gueuche noir			France, Franche-Comté			
Helfensteiner			Germany		20	1931
Heroldrebe			Germany		155 (2008)	1929
Hondarribi Beltza			Spain, Basque			
Hron			Slovakia	Abouriou × Castets (grape)	5 (2011)	1976
Humagne Rouge / Cornalin d'Aoste			Italy, Aosta		128 (Switzerland 2009)	
Joubertin / Jaubertin			France, Savoy wine			
Juan García			Spain, Galicia (Spain)			
Jurancon noir			France, Southwest			
Kadarka			Hungary			
Kakhet			Armenia			
Kalecik Karasi			Turkey, Ankara Province			
Kindzmarauli/ Saperavi			Georgia			
Kotsifali			Greek, Crete			
Krasnostop Zolotovsky		Krasnostop, Krasnostop Anapsky	Russia, Rostov Oblast and Krasnodar Krai		66 (2010)	
Kratosija			North Macedonia			
Lacrima di Morro / Lacrima nera			Italy, Marche			
Lagrein			Italy, South Tyrol	Child of Teroldego and Schiava Gentile		
Lambrusco			Italy, Emilia-Romagna			
Liatiko			Greece, Crete			
Limnio			Greece, Lemnos			
Listan negro			Spain, Canary Islands			
Loureira Tinta		Loureiro Tinto	Spain, Galicia (Spain)			
Madrasa/ Matrassa			Azerbaijan (Azerbaijani wine)			
Magarach Bastardo/Bastardo Magarach			Ukraine			
Magaratch Ruby / Magarach Ruby			Ukraine			1928
Magliocco Canino/Maiolica			Italy, Calabrian wine		1,500	
Magliocco Dolce/Marsigliana nera			Italy, Calabria			
Magyarfrankos			Hungary			1953
Malbec		Auxerrois, Cot	France		1,400 (France), 20,000 (Argentina), 7,000 (United States), 1,235 (Australia)	
Malvasia di Schierano/Malvasia nera			Greece			
Mammolo			Italy, Tuscany			
Mandelaria / Mandelari / Amorghiano			Greece			
Mandolari			Greece			
Manseng noir			France, Basque Country (greater region)			
Manto negro			Spain, Majorca			
Mara			Switzerland			2008
Maratheftiko			Cyprus		125	
Marselan			France, Languedoc			1961
Marsigliana			Italy, Calabrian wine			
Marzemino			Italy, South Tyrol			
Mauzac noir			Southwest France			
Mavro			Cyprus			
Mavrodafni / Mavrodaphne			Greece, Achaea			
Mavrud / Mavroudi			Bulgaria, Thrace			
Mayorquin			France, Provence wine			
Meghrabujr			Armenia			
Melnik			Bulgaria			
Mencía / Jaén colorado			Spain, Galicia			
Merenzao			Spain, Galicia, Valdeorras (DO)			
Merille			France, South West France (wine region)			
Merlot			France		260,000 (2004)	
Milgranet			France, South West France (wine region)			
Millot /Léon Millot			France, Alsace			1911
Mission			Spain		400	
Molinara			Italy, Veneto wine			
Mondeuse / Mondeuse Noire			France, Savoy wine		200 (2000)	
Mondeuse Grise			France, Savoy wine			2006
Monica			Spain, Italy-Sardinia			
Montepulciano			Italy, Abruzzo (wine)			
Montù / Montuni			Italy, Emilia (region of Italy)			
Moreto			Portugal, Alentejo wine			
Moristel		Concejón, Juán Ibáñez, Miguel de Arcos and Miguel del Arco (or Miguel d'Arco)	Spain, Aragon			
Mornen noir			France, Rhone			
Morrastel Bouschet			France, Aude			
Mourisco tinto			Portugal			
Mourvèdre / Monastrell / Mataro/ Rossola nera/Garrut			Spain		260 (France), 1000 (Australia)	
Mouyssaguès			France, Marcillac		nearly extinct	
Mtevandidi			Georgia, Guria			
Mujuretuli			Georgia			
Muscardin			France, Southern Rhone			
Muscat Bouschet			France			
Muscat Hamburg			Germany			
Nebbiolo			Italy, Piedmont		5,100 (Italy), 1,100 (United States), 81 (Argentina)	
Negoska			Greece, Central Macedonia			
Negrara			Italy, Veneto wine			
Négrette/ Pinot St. George			France, South West France (wine region)			
Negroamaro			Italy, Puglia			
Negru de Dragasani			Romania, Romanian wine			
Nerkarat			Armenia, Tavush Region			
Nero Buono di Cori			Italy			
Nero d'Avola			Italy, Sicily			
Nerello Mascalese			Italy, Sicily			
Nerello Cappuccio			Italy, Sicily			
Neretto di Bairo			Italy			
Neyret			Italy, Valle d'Aosta DOC			
Nielluccio			France, Corsica		1,500 (Corsica)	
Ninčuša			Croatia, Croatian wine			
Nocera			Italy, Calabrian wine			
Notardomenico			Italy, Brindisi			
Oeillade noire			France, Languedoc and Provence			
Ojaleshi			Georgia, Georgian wine			
Öküzgözü			Turkey, Elazığ Province			
Oseleta			Italy, Verona			
Onaka			United States, bred at South Dakota State University by Nels Hansen	Beta of Vitis labrusca and Vitis riparia × Salem of Vitis labrusca and Vitis vinifera	Although never widely cultivated and today largely forgotten, it has contributed to the cold-climate grape-breeding efforts of breeders such as Elmer Swenson, who suspected a nearby vine of Onaka to be a likely parent of his variety Kay Gray.	
Pais			Spain			
Pallagrello nero			Campania, Italy			
Pamid			Bulgaria			
Pascale di Cagliari			Italy, Sardinia			
Pelaverga			Italy, Piedmont			
Peloursin			France, Rhône-Alpes			
Perdal			Portugal			
Perricone/Guarnaccia			Italy, Sicily		1,000	
Persan			France, Savoy wine			
Petit Bouschet			France, Spain, Portugal, North Africa			1824
Petit Rouge			Italy, Valle d'Aosta DOC			
Petit Verdot			France, South West		1,600 (Australia 2000), 137 (Chile 2009), 360 (United States 2000)	
Piccola nera			Italy, Trieste			
Piedirosso			Italy, Campania			
Pignerol			France, Provence wine			
Pignola Valtellinese			Italy, Valtellina			
Pignolo			Italy, Friuli-Venezia Giulia wine			
Pineau d'Aunis			France, Loire Valley (wine)			
Pinot Meunier / Schwarzriesling / Müllerebe			France		2,424 (Germany 2006)	
Pinot Noir / Spätburgunder / Blauburgunder / Pinot Nero			France			
Pinotage			South Africa			1925
Piquepoul noir			France, Rhone Valley and Languedoc			
Plassa			Italy, Piedmont			
Plavina / Brajda Mala / Brajdica / Bratkovina / Jurkovica / Marasovka /Modrulj / Plavac Plavina /Plavinac /Plavina Mala / Plavina Sitnah / Plavina Velka / Plavka / Plavka Mala / Velika Plavka			Croatia, Dalmatia			
Pollera nera			Italy, Liguria wine			
Portan			France, Languedoc-Roussillon wine			
Poulsard/ Plousard			France, Jura wine			
Prieto Picudo			Spain, Province of León			
Prokupac			Serbia			
Raboso			Italy, Veneto			
Ramisco			Portugal, Colares DOC			
Reberger			Germany	Blaufränkisch × Regent		1986
Refosco / Refošk		Teran	Italy, Friuli-Venezia Giulia wine			
Rimava			Slovakia			
Roesler			Austria	Zweigelt × (Seyve-Villard 18-402 × Blaufränkisch)		1970
Rondinella			Italy, Veneto			
Rossese			Italy, Liguria wine			
Rossignola			Italy, Veneto			1818
Rossolino nero			Italy, Valtellina, Lombardy wine			
Rotberger			Germany			1928
Rouchet/ Ruché / Roche			Italy, Piedmont			
Rubintos			Hungary			1951
Ruby Cabernet		Ruby Chablais, Ruby Chablis	US, California			1936
Rufete / Tinta Pinheira / Tinta Carvalha / Rufeta			Portugal, Douro DOC			
Sagrantino			Italy, Umbria			
Sangiovese			Italy, Tuscany		63,000 (Italy), 2,800 (Argentina), 1,700 (Romania), 1,600 (France), 1,400 (California), 440 (Australia)	
San Giuseppe nero			Italy, Lazio			
Saperavi			Georgia			
Schiava / Trollinger / Vernatsch			Italy, Trentino-Alto Adige/Südtirol wine	at least 3 varieties sharing 50% DNA, many clones	2,300 (Germany)	at least since late Middle Ages
Schioppettino			Italy, Friuli-Venezia Giulia wine			
Schönburger			Germany	Pinot noir × (Chasselas × Muscat Hamburg)		1979
Sciacarello			Italy			
Sciascinoso / Olivella nera			Italy, Campania		440 (1999)	
Segalin / Ségalin			France			1957
Servanin			France, Isère			
Sgaretta/Sgavetta			Italy, Emilia-Romagna			
Shiraz / Syrah			France		142,600 (2004)	
Shiroka Melnishka Losa / Melnik			Bulgaria			
Sousão/Souzão/Sousón			Portugal, Minho Province			
St. Laurent / Svatovavrinecke			France		1,730 (Czech Republic), 800 (Austria)	
Saint-Macaire			France, South-West			
Sumoll		Sumoll negro, Sumoll tinto, Vijariego negra, Verijariego negra, Vijariego Negro	Spain, Catalonia		100	
Susumaniello			Italy, Puglia			
Tannat			France, South West France (wine region)		150 (California)	
Tarrango			Australia	Touriga Nacional × Sultana		1965
Tazzelenghe			Italy, Friuli-Venezia Giulia wine			
Tempranillo / Aragónez / Tinta Roriz / Ull de Llebre / Cencibel / Tinta del Pais		Albillo negro, Aldepenas, Aragon, Aragones, Aragonez, Aragónez, Aragonez da ferra, Aragonez de elvas, Arauxa, Arganda, Arinto tinto, Cencibal, Cencibel, Cencibera, Chinchillana, Chinchillano, Chinchilyano, Crujidera, Cupani, De por aca, Escobera, Garnacho fono, Grenache de logrono, Jacibera, Jacibiera, Jacivera, Juan garcia, Negra de mesa, Negretto, Ojo de liebre, Olho de lebre, Palomino negro, Pinuela, Roriz, Sensibel, Tempranilla, Tempranillo crni, Tempranillo de la rioja, Tempranillo de perralta, Tempranillo de rioja, Tempranillo de rioza, Tempranillo rioja, Tinta aragones, Tinta corriente, Tinta de madrid, Tinta de santiago, Tinta de toro, Tinta del pais, Tinta do inacio, Tinta do pais, Tinta fina, Tinta madrid, Tinta monteira, Tinta monteiro, Tinta roris, Tinta roriz, Tinta santiago, Tinto aragon, Tinto aragones, Tinto aragonez, Tinto de la ribera, Tinto de madrid, Tinto de rioja, Tinto de toro, Tinto del pais, Tinto del toro, Tinto fino, Tinto fino de Madrid, Tinto madrid, Tinto pais, Tinto ribiera, Tinto riojano, Tinto tempranillo, Ull de liebre, Ull de llebre, Valdepenas, Verdiell, Vid de aranda.	Spain, Rioja (wine)	Albillo Mayor × Benedicto	170,000 (2004)	
Teran			Croatia, Istria		400 (2013)	
Termarina rossa			Italy, Emilia-Romagna			
Teroldego / Teroldego Rotaliano			Italy, Trentino-Alto Adige/Südtirol wine		390 (Italy)	
Terret noir			France, Rhone valley	Vitis vinifera × Terret	189 (2007)	
Thiniatiko			Greece			
Tibouren			France, Provence			
Tinta Amarela			Portugal			
Tinta Barroca			Portugal, Douro			
Tinta Caiada			Portugal			
Tinta Carvalha			Portugal, Trás-os-Montes e Alto Douro Province			
Tinta Francisca			Portugal, Douro DOC			
Tinta Madeira			Portugal			
Tinta Miuda			Portugal, Oeste Subregion			
Tinta Negra Mole / Preto Martinho			Portugal, Madeira			
Tinto Cão			Portugal, Douro			
Touriga Franca / Touriga Francesa			Portugal, Dão DOC	Mourisco de Semente × Touriga Nacional	7,440 (Portugal)	
Touriga Nacional / Azal Espanhol / Preto de Mortágua			Portugal, Douro		2,760 (Portugal 1990)	
Turán			Hungary	(Teinturier × Kadarka) × (Medoc noir × Csaba gyöngye)		
Trepat		Bonicaire, Embolicaire, Parrel, Trapat, Traput and Trepan	Spain, Conca de Barberà (DO)		1500	
Trevisana nera			Italy, Veneto			
Trincadeira/ Castelão / Torneiro			Portugal, Alentejo wine			
Usakhelauri			Georgia, Racha-Lechkhumi and Kvemo Svaneti			
Uva di Troia /Nero di Troia/ Sumarello/ Uva di Canosa/ Uva di Barletta/ Troiano/ Tranese / Uva della Marina.			Italy, Apulia			
Uvalino			Italy, Piedmont			
Uva Rara			Italy, Piedmont and Lombardy		608 (2000)	
Uva Tosca			Italy, Emilia-Romagna		115 (2000)	
Vaccarese / Vaccarèse/ Brun Argenté			France, Rhone			
Valdiguié / Brocol / Napa Gamay / Gamay 15			France, Languedoc-Roussillon			1874
Valentino nero			Italy, Piedmont	Chatus × Dolcetto		
Vermentino nero			Italy, Tuscany		199 (2000)	
Vespolina			Italy, Piedmont	Nebbiolo × ?		
Vien de Nus			Italy, Valle d'Aosta DOC			
Volidza/Volitsa			Greece, high altitudes in the Peloponnese region			ancient
Vranac			Montenegro			
Vuillermin			Italy, Aosta Valley	Fumin × ?	0.10 ha (2000)	
Wildbacher/Blauer Wildbacher			Austria			
Wrothham Pinot			France			
Xinomavro		Xynomavro	Greece, Central Macedonia			1800
Žametovka			Slovenia			
Zinfandel / Crljenak Kaštelanski / Primitivo			Croatia			
Zweigelt / Zweigeltrebe / Rotburger			Austria	St. Laurent (grape) × Blaufränkisch	6,512 (Austria 2008)	1922

==== White grapes ====
Common name(s)	All synonyms	Country of origin	Pedigree	Hectares cultivated (year)	Year of introduction
Adalmiina	Aldemina, Elmer Swenson	US	Elmer Swenson		
Addoraca	Odoacra	Italy			
Agh Shani		Azerbaijan			
Aidani / Aidini / Aedani	Aidani, Aspro, Aedano, Aedani, Aidano, Aspedano, Aspraidano, Asproaidani, Leyko, Lefko, Lafko Aidani, and Lefko Ithani	Greece (Santorini)			
Airén	Aiden, Blancon, Forcallada, Forcallat, Forcallat blanca, Forcallat blanco, Forcayat, Forcellat bianca, Forcellat blanca, Laeren del Rey, Lairen, Layren, Manchega, Mantuo Laeren, Valdepenas, Valdepenera blanca, and Valdepenero	Spain		252,000 (2010)	1615 (first mention), possibly 15th century.
Alarije / Alarijen		Spain			
Albalonga		Germany			
Albana	Albana a Grappo Longo, Albana a Grappolo Fitto, Albana a Grappolo Lungo, Albana a Grappolo Rado o Gentile, Albana dell'Istria (?), Albana della Forcella, Albana di Bertinoro, Albana di Bologna, Albana di Forli, Albana di Gatteo, Albana di Lugo, Albana di Montiano, Albana di Pesaro, Albana di Romagna, Albana di Terra Del Sole, Albana Gentile, Albana Gentile di Faenza, Albana Gentile di Ravenna, Albana Grossa, Albano, Albanone, Albuelis, Biancame Sinalunga, Forcella, Forcellata, Forcellina, Forcelluta, Raccia Pollone, Ribona, Riminese, and Sforcella.	Italy	Garganega(?)		13th century
Albanella		Italy			
Albanello bianco	Alablanca, Albanella, Albanello Bianco di Siracusa, Alvanella, Alvanello, Arnina Bianca, Arvina and Claretta	Italy		125(2000)	
Albaranzeuli bianco	Albaranzèllu, Alvarenzeli, Alvarenzell, Alvaranzeuli, Alvaranzeuli bianco, Lacconargiu, Lacconarzu, Lacconazzu biancu, Laconari bianca, Laconarzu, Laconazzu bianco, Liconargiu and Licronasciu	Italy		75 (2000)	
Albarello		Spain			ancient
Albariño / Alvarinho / Cainho branco	Albarina, Alvarin Blanco, Alvarinha, Alvarinho, Azal Blanco, Galego and Galeguinho.	Spain			
Albarola	Albarola bianca, Albarola di Lavagna, Albarola trebbiana, Bianchetta Genovese, Calcatella, Calcatella di Sarzana, Erbarola, Temosci, Trebbiano di Sarzana and Trebbiano locale	Italy			
Albillo	Albilla, Albillo de Cebreros, Albillo de Madrid, Albillo de Toro, Albillo Castellano, Blanco del País, Castellano, Gual, Hoja Vuelta, Nieves Temprano, Pardillo, Abuela, Acerba, Acerva, Albarin blanco, Albil Prado, Albilo Kasteliano, Albillo blanco, Albillo blanco fino, Albillo Cagalon, Albillo Castillan, Albillo de Granada, Albillo de Huebla, Albillo de San Jeronimo, Albillo Dorado, Albillo Prado, Albillo Peco, Albillo Peco de Trebugena, Albillo Real, Albillo Temprano, Albillo Verdal, Albuela, Alvilla, Alvillo, Arvilla, Besto Maduro, Blanco Castellano, Blanco Pais, Blanco Ribera, Blanco Rivera, Cagalon, Cepa Canasta, Cepa de Lena, De Lena, Hogazuela, Hogomela, Nives Temprano, Ojo de Liebre, Pardillo de Albillo, Picapol, Prolifera, Temprano de Campo Real, Temprano de Mora, Uva de Lena, Uva Pardilla and Verdaguilla.	Spain			
Alcañón	Blanco Castellano and Bobal Blanca.	Spain			
Aligoté	Aligotay, Alligotay, Alligoté, Blanc de Troyes, Carcairone blanc, Carcarone, Carchierone, Chaudenet, Chaudenet Gras, Giboudot blanc, Griset blanc, Karkarone Blank, Melon de Jura, Muhranuli, Mukhranudi, Pistone, Plant de Trois, Plant de Trois Raisins, Plant gris, Purion blanc, Selon Molon, Selon Odart, Troyen blanc, Vert blanc.	France (Burgundy)		45,000 (2004)	18th century
Alionza	Aglionza, Alconza, Aleonza, Alionga, Bianca del Bolognese, Allionza, Allionza bianca, Glionza, Leonza, Uva Lonza and Uva Schiava.	Italy (Emilia-Romagna)		43 (2012)	14th century
Altesse / Roussette	Altesse Blanche, Altesse Verte, Arin, Fusette, Fusette d'Amberieu, Fusette de Montagnieu, Ignam, Ignan Blanc, Maconnais, Petit Maconnais, Prin Blanc, Rousette Haute, Roussette, Roussette Basse, Roussette de Montagnieu, Roussette Grosse, Roussette Haute, Roussette Petite, Serene Blanche.	France		300 (France, 2000)	
Amigne	Amigne Blanche and Amique.	Switzerland	Petit Meslier	43 (2009)	
Ansonica / Inzolia	Amsonica, Ansolia, Ansolica, Ansoliku, Ansonica Bianca, Ansora, Ansoria, Ansorica, Anzonaka, Anzonica, Anzulu, Arba Solika, Erba Insolika, Inselida, Insolia, Insolia di Palermo, Insora, Inzolia, Inzolia Parchitana, Nsolia, Nsuolia, Nzolia, Nzolia Bianca, Nzolia di Lipari, Nzolia di Palermo, Soria, and Zolia Bianca.	Italy			
Antao Vaz					
Arany sárfehér / Izsáki	Izsáki Sárfehér, Fehér dinka, Német dinka, Huszár szőlő	Hungary (Izsák)	selected white Kadarka		1873
Arbane	Albane (in Aube), Arbane blanc, Arbane du Bachet, Arbanne (in Les Riceys and Moulins-en-Tonnerrois), Arbanne blanche, Arbenne, Arbenne blanc, Arbone, Crène (in Balnot-sur-Laignes, Balnot-la-Grange and Polisot), Crene, Crénillat (La Valla-en-Gier and Rive-de-Gier in Loire), Crenillat and Darbanne (in Aube).	France		<1 (France 2006)	
Arbois	Menu Pineau and Petit Pineau, Herbois, Orbois and Verdet.	France		300 (France, 2004)	
Arilla	Agrilla, Arillo, Rille and Uva Rilla	Italy			
Arinto / Assario branco	Arintho, Arintho du Dao, Arinto Cachudo, Arinto Cercial, Arinto d'Anadia, Arinto de Bucelas, Arinto do Douro, Arinto Galego, Asal Espanhol, Asal Galego, Assario branco, Boal Cachudo, Branco Espanhol, Cerceal, Chapeludo, Malvasia Fina, Pe de Perdiz branco, Pederna, and Pedernao.	Portugal			
Arneis	Bianchetta, Bianchetta d'Alba, Bianchetta di Alba, Bianchetto, Bianchetto Albese, Bianchetto di Alba, Bianchetto di Verzuolo, and Nebbiolo bianco.	Italy		610 (Italy, 2006)	
Arnsburger		Germany	Riesling clone 88 × clone 64		
Arrufiac / Arrufiat / Ruffiac	Ambre, Arafiat, Arrefiac, Arrefiat, Arrufiat, Arufiat, Raffiac, Raffiat, Refiat, Rouffiac Femelle, Ruffiac, Ruffiac Blanc, and Rufiat.	France			
Arvesiniadu	Alvu Signadu, Argu Ingianau, Argu Ingiannau, Arvesimiadu bianco, Arvu Siniadu, Arvusiniadu, Arvusiniagu, Avrisiniadu and Uva Oschirese.	Italy		150 (Italy, 2000)	1780
Asprinio bianco	Asprinia di Aversa, Asprinio, Asprino, Greco, Lacrima, Olivese, Ragusano, Ragusano Bianco, Uva Asprina and Uva Asprinia.	Italy			
Assyrtiko / Assyrtico	Arcytico, Assirtico, Assyrtico, Asurtico, and Asyrtiko.	Greece			
Athiri	Asprathiri, Asprathiro, Athiri Aspro, Athiri Lefko, and Athiri Leyko.	Greece			
Aubin / Aubin blanc	Albin Blanc, Aneb ben Cadi, Aubin, Blanc de Magny, Gros Vert de Crenay	France	Gouais blanc × Savagnin		
Aubin vert	Aubun vert, Blanc d'Euvezin, Blanc d'Euvizin and Vert blanc.	France	Gouais blanc × Pinot		
Aurelius					
Auxerrois blanc	Arboisier, Arnaison blanc, Arnoison, Aubaine, Auvergnat blanc, Auvernas blanc, Auvernat blanc, Auxois blanc, Bargeois blanc, Beaunois, Blanc De Champagne, Breisgauer Sussling, Burgundi Feher, Chablis, Chardennet, Chardonnay blanc, Chatey Petit, Chaudenet, Claevner, Clevner Weiss, Epinette blanche, Epinette De Champagne, Ericey blanc, Feher Chardonnay, Feherburgundi, Feinburgunder, Gamay blanc, Gelber Weissburgunder, Gentil blanc, Grosse Bourgogne, Klawner, Klevanjka Biela, Lisant, Luisant, Luizannais, Luizant, Luzannois, Maconnais, Maurillon blanc, Melon blanc, Melon D'Arbois, Moreau blanc, Morillon blanc, Moulon, Noirien blanc, Petit Chatey, Petit Sainte-marie, Pino Shardone, Pinot Blanc A Cramant, Pinot Blanc Chardonnay, Pinot Chardonnay, Plant De Tonnerre, Romere, Romeret, Rouci Bile, Rousseau, Roussot, Rulander Weiss, Sainte Marie Petite, Sardone, Shardone, Weiss Silber, Weissedler, Auxerrois blanc de Laquenexy and Auxerrois de Laquenexy.	France	Gouais blanc × Pinot noir	1950 (France), 218 (Germany, 2012)	
Avesso	Bornal, Bornao, Borracal Branco, and Borral.	Portugal			
Azal branco	Asal branco, Asal da Lixa, Azal bianco, Azal da Lixa, Carvalha, Carvalhal, Es Pinheira, Gadelhudo, and Pinheira.	Portugal		5100 (Portugal)	
Barcelo					
Bacchus	Bacchus Weiss, Weisser Bacchus, Frühe Scheurebe, Geilweilerhof 33-29-133 and Gf. 33-29-133.	Germany	Silvaner Î Riesling × Müller-Thurgau	2113 (Germany, 2006)	1933
Baco blanc	22 A Baco, Baco 22 A, Baco 22-A, Baco 221, Maurice Baco, and Piquepoul de Pays.	France, United States	Folle blanche × Noah grape	10700	1898
Baiyu / Rkatsiteli		Georgia			
Balzac blanc	Balzard blanc, Balzat, Blanc Limousin, Chigne, Dressiere, Limousin blanc, Margnac blanc, Plant de Saint Jean and Ressière.	France	Gouais blanc × Chenin blanc		1842
Banat Riesling / Banat Rizling					
Baratuciat	Bertauciat and Bertacucià	Italy		2 (Australia, 2011)	
Barbera bianca	Bertolino, Bertoulin, Caria l'Aso, Lardera, Lardera bianca, Lardera delle Langhe, Martinella, Martinetta, Ovata bianca, Peigein, Peigin, Peisìn, Peisin, Poison bianco, Poisino and Uva Ovata	Italy		280 (Italy, 2000)	1825
Bariadorgia	Bariadorgia bianca, Barria Dorgia, Barriadorgia (in Sardinia), Barriadorza, Carcaghjolu biancu, Carcajola, Carcajolo bianco (in Sardinia), Carcajolo blanc (in Corsica), Cargajola blanc, Fragrante, Gregu bianco (in Sardinia), Variatoghja and Verzolina bianca	France/Italy			1822
Baroque	Barake, Baroca, Baroke, Barroque, Blanc Bordelais, Bordelais, Bordelais blanc, Bordeleza zuria, Boudales, Bourdales, Claverie blanc, Escripet folle, Muscadelle de Nates, Petit Bordelais, Plant Bordelais and Sable blanc.	France	Folle Blanche × Sauvignon Blanc		
Belina					
Benedino					
Besgano bianco	Besgano bianca, Besgano, Bianco di Bobbio, Colombana bianca, Gragnolato blanco, Grangnolo bianco, Grignola, Grignolato bianco, Grignolino bianco, Grignolo, Grignolo bianco, Grignolo Bianco di San Colombano, San Colombano Piccolo and Uva di Milano.	Italy			
Bia blanc	Bear, Beard and Biard	France			
Bianca	Biahka, Bianka, EC 40, ECS 40, Egri Csillagok 40 and May Rot.	Hungary	Bouvier × Eger 2	1280 (Hungary, 2012), 2731 (Russia, 2009), 15 (Moldova, 2012)	1963
Biancame / Bianchello	Malvasia di Sardegna, Trebbiano Toscano and Albana	Italy		2080 (Italy, 2000)	
Bianchetta Trevigiana	Bianca Gentile di Fonzaso, Bianchetta, Bianchetta Gentile, Bianchetta Semplice, Bianco Vernanzinaj, Cenese, Pavana bianca, Pignolo bianco, Senese (in Breganze), Uva Cinese, Vernaccia, Vernaccia di Verona, Vernaccia Trentina, Vernanzina (in the Berici Hills), Vernassina (in the Euganean Hills), Vernazza, Vernazza Trentina, Vernazzina, Weisser Vernatch and Weissvernatsch.	Italy		65 (Italy, 2000)	late 17th century
Bianchetti Genovese					
Bianco d'Alessano	Acchiappapalmento, Achiappapalmento, Bianco d'Assano, Bianco di Latiano, Bianco di Lessame, Bianco di Palmento, Bianco di Valdigna, Butta Palmento, Iuvarello (in Calabria), Verdurino and Vuiono (in Calabria)	Italy		960 (Italy, 2000), 4 (Australia, 2012)	
Biancolella	Bianca, Bianca Tera, Biancolella selvatica, Biancolella Veraca, Biancolella Verace, Biancolillo, Bianculella, Bianculellu, Ianculella, Ianculillo, Jancolella, Janculella, Janculillo, Petite blance and Petite Blanche.	Italy			
Biancu Gentile					
Biancone di Portoferraio	Biancona, Biancone (in Corsica), Biancone blanc, Corcesco, Folle Verte d'Oleron, Pagadebiti di Porto S. Stefano, Pagadebiti di Porto San Stefano and Uva bianca.	Italy / France			
Bical / Borrado das Moscas	Arinto de Alcobaça, Barrado das Moscas, Bical de Bairrada, Borrado das Moscas (in the Dao), Pintado das Moscas, and Pintado dos Pardais.	Portugal			
Bigolona	Bigolara, Bigolona bianca, Bigolona Veronese, Sampagna and Smarzirola.	Italy			early 19th century
Blatterle	Bianchetto de Verzuolo, Blaterle, Blatterl and Platterle.	Italy			
Bratislavské biele					
Boais					
Bogdanuša	Bogdanoucha, Bogdanuša Bijela, Bogdanuša Mala, Bogdanuša Vela, Bogdanuša Vela Mladinka, Bojadanuša, Bojdanuša, Mladeinka, Vrbanjka, and Vrbanjska.	Croatia			
Bombino bianco	Abondante, Bambino, Bambino Peloso Gentile, Bammino, Banjac, Bilana, Bobbino, Bommino, Bonvino, Bonvino bianco, Buon Vino, Buonvino bianco, Butta Palmento, Butta Pezzente, Buttspezzante, Calatammurro, Calpolese, Camblese, Campanile, Campolese, Campolese Camplese, Campolese Chiuso, Campolese Scinciaro, Campolese Sciniato, Carapa, Castella, Cococciola, Cola Tamburo, Colatammurro, Debit, Debit Veliki, Donnee, Marese, Ottenese, Ottonese (in central Italy, particularly the Lazio region), Pagadebiti (in Emilia-Romagna), Poulzhinatz, Pulizanac, Puljizanac, Ribola, Ripona, Scacciadebiti, Schiacciadebiti, Straccia Cambiale, Strappa Cambiale, Tivolese bianco, Trebbiano Abruzzese, Trebbiano Bianco di Chieti, Trebbiano Campolese, Trebbiano d'Abruzzo, Trebbiano d'Ora, Trebbiano d'Oro, Trebbiano di Abruzzo, Trebbiano di Avezzano, Trebbiano di Macerata, Trebbiano di Teramo, Trebbiano Dorato di Teramo, Trivolese, Uva Castellana, Uva da un Osso, Uva Fermana, Uva Romana, and Zapponara bianca.	Italy		3000 (Italy, 2000)	
Borba blanca		Spain			
Bosco	Bosco Bianco, Bosco Bianco del Genovesato and Madea.	Italy			
Bourboulenc	Berlou blanc, Blanquette, Blanquette du Frontonnais, Blanquette du Gard, Blanquette menue, Bourbojlanc, Bourboulenco, Bourbouleng, Bourboulenque, Bourbounenco, Burbulen, Clairette dorée à Paulhan, Clairette à grains ronds, Clairette blanche, Clairette dorée, Clairette grosse, Clairette rousse, Clairette rousse du Var, Doucillon, Frappad, Grosse Clairette, Malvoisie, Malvoisie à la Clape, Mourterille, Ondenc, Picardan, Roussaou, Roussette, Roussette du Vaucluse.	France		800 (France, 2000)	
Bouvier	Bela Ranina, Bela Ranka, Boouvierovo Grozno, Bouvier blanc, Bouvier Précoce, Bouvier Trante weisse, Bouvier Traube weisse, Bouvierov Hrozen, Bouvierova Ranina, Bouvierovo Grozno, Bouvierovo Hrozno, Bouvierovo Ranina, Bouvierrebe, Bouviertraube, Bouviertraube weisse, Bouvieruv Hrozen, Bouvijejeva Ranka, Bouvijeorva Ranina, Bouvijerova Ranka, Bovije, Buveleova Ranka, Buvie, Buvierov Hrozen, Buvije, Buvijeova Ranina, Buvijeova Ranka, Buvijeva Ranka, Buvileova Ranka, Chasselas Bouvier, Findling, Kimmig Kp 1, Précoce de Bouvier, Précoce de Bouvier bianco, Précoce de Bouvier blanc, Précoce di Bouvier bianco, Radgonska Ranina, Radgonska Ranina bijela, Ragdonska Ranina bela, Ranina, Ranina bela, Ranka, and Sasla Buvije.	Slovenia	Pinot × Muscat Blanc à Petits Grains	365 (Austria, 1999), 31 (Germany, 2004)	1900
Breidecker	CD 4984, Geisenheim 4984, and Gm 49-84	Germany	Riesling × Silvaner × Siebel 7053		1962
Brustiano bianco	Bruschiami, Bruschianu, Bruschjami, Bruschjanu, Brustiano, Brustianu, Calitrano (in the commune of Sartène on Corsica), Calitranu, Colitrano (in Corsica) and Licronaxu bianco (in Sardinia).	France			
Bual / Boal		Portugal			
Budai Zöld					
Bukettraube	Bocksbeutel, Bouquet Blanc, Bouquet Traube, Bouquettraube, Boxer, Buket, Bukettrebe, Bukettriesling, Sylvaner Musqué, Würzburger.	Germany	Silvaner × Schiava Grossa		19th century
Burger / Monbadon	Aouba, Auba, Berger, Blanc de Cadillac, Burger, Cadillac, Caoba, Castillone à Montendre, Frontignan, Frontignan des Charentes, Grand Blanc, Gros Montils, Meslier d'Orleans, Monbadon, and Ugni de Montpellier.	France			
Caíño blanco	Alvarinhão, Cainho, Cainho branco, Cainho de Moreira (in Vinho Verde), Caino blanco, Caíño branco (in Galicia and Portugal), Caino branco and Caino de Moreira.	Spain / Portugal		58 (Spain, 2008), 7 (Portugal, 2010)	Early 18th century
Camaralet	Camaralet blanc, Camaralet à Fleurs Femelles, Camaralet de Lasseube, Camarau, Camaraou blanc, Gentil aromatique, Moustardet and Petit Camarau.	France			
Canari blanc	Bellecital, Caillaba and Cailleba	France			
Caprettone		Italy		1027 (Italy, 2000)	
Carica l'Asino					
Carignan blanc	Feher Carignan and Karinjan	France		411 (France, 2008)	
Cascarolo bianco	Cascarala, Cascarecul, Cascarelbo and Cascarolo.	Italy			Early 17th century
Catarratto	Castellaro, Cataratto Bertolaro, Catarratto Bianco Comune, Catarratto Bianco Extra Lucido, Cataratto Bianco Latino, Catarratto Bianco Lucido, Catarratto Bianco Lustro, Cataratto Bianco Nostrale, Cataratto Carteddaro, Catarratto Bertolare, Catarratto Bertolaro, Catarratto Bianco Latino, Catarratto Bianco Nostrale Catarratto Carteddaro, Cattaratto Commune, and Catarrato Lucido.	Italy			
Cayetana / Calagraño / Jaén blanca / Garrido	Amor blanco, Aujubi, Avesso du Minho, Baladi, Baladi-Verdejo, Belledy, Blanca Cayetana, Blanco Jaen, Cagazal, Calagrano, Calagrano blanc, Calegrano, Cayetana blanca, Cazagal, Charello, Charelo, Chaselo, Cheres, Cirial, Clagrano, Dedo, Dedro, Djiniani, Doradillo, Farta Gosos, Fartagosos, Garillo, Garrida, Garrido, Garriga, Garrilla, Hoja Vuelta, Jaén blanco, Jaén Doradillo, Jaén Empinadillo, Jaén Prieto blanco, Jaenes, Jaina, Jarime, Jean de Castilla, Jean de Letur, Jean de Letur de Maratella, Jean Doradillo, Jean Dore, Jean Prieto, Machuenco, Maizancho, Mariouti, Mourisco Arsello, Mourisco Portalegre, Naves, Naves Cazagal, Neruca, Padero, Parda, Pardilla, Pardina, Pirulet, Plateadillo, Plateado, Robal, Tierra de Barros, Verdeja, Virules, and Xarello.	Spain			
Cereza	Ceresa, Ceresina, Cereza Italiana, Cerise, and Chereza.	Argentina		37600 (Argentina, 2003)	
Chardonnay	Arboisier, Arnaison blanc, Arnoison, Aubain, Aubaine, Auvergnat blanc, Auvernas, Auvernas blanc, Auvernat blanc, Auxeras, Auxerras blanc, Auxerrois blanc, Auxois, Auxois blanc, Bargeois blanc, Beaunois, Biela Klevanjika, Blanc de Champagne, Blanc de Cramant, Breisgauer Suessling, Breisgauer Sussling, Burgundi Feher, Chablis, Chardenai, Chardenay, Chardenet, Chardennet, Chardonay, Chardonnet, Chatenait, Chatey Petit, Chatte, Chaudenay, Chaudenet, Chaudent, Clävner, Clevner Weiss, Cravner, Epinette, Epinette blanc, Epinette blanche, Epinette de Champagne, Ericey blanc, Feher Chardonnay, Feherburgundi, Feinburgunder, Gamay blanc, Gelber Weissburgunder, Gentil blanc, Grosse Bourgogne, Klawner, Klevanjka Biela, Klevner, Lisant, Luisant, Luizannais, Luizant, Luzannois, Maconnais, Maurillon blanc, Melon blanc, Melon D'Arbois, Meroué, Moreau blanc, Morillon blanc, Moulon, Noirien blanc, Obaideh, Petit Chatey, Petit Sainte-Marie, Petite Sainte Marie, Pineau blanc, Pino Sardone, Pino Shardone, Pinot Blanc à Cramant, Pinot Blanc Chardonnay, Pinot Chardonnay, Pinot de Bourgogne, Pinot Giallo, Pinot Planc, Plant de Tonnerre, Romere, Romeret, Rouci Bile, Rousseau, Roussot, Ruländer Weiß, Sainte Marie Petite, Sardone, Shardone, Shardonne, Später Weiß Burgunder, Weiß Burgunder (normally refers to Pinot blanc), Weiß Clevner, Weiß Edler, Weiß Elder, Weiß Klewner, Weiß Silber, Weißedler, Weißer Clevner, Weißer Rulander.	France	Pinot × Gouais blanc		
Chasan	E.M. 1527-78	France	Listan × Pinot		1958
Chasselas / Fendant / Gutedel / Weisser Gutedel	Abelione, Abelone, Albilloidea, Alsacia blanca, Amber Chasselas, Amber Muscadine, Bar sur Aube, Bela Glera, Bela Zlahtnina, Berezka Prostaya, Berioska Casla, Beyaz Gutedel, Biela Plemenika Praskava, Biela Plemincka Chrapka, Biela Plemincka Pruskawa, Blanchette, Blanquette, Bon blanc, Bordo, Bournet, Bournot, Chablais, Charapka, Chasselas, Chasselas Angevin, Chasselas bianco, Chasselas Blanc Royal, Chasselas Blanchette, Chasselas Crognant, Chasselas Croquant, Chasselas de Bar-sur-Aube, Chasselas de Bordeaux, Chasselas de Florence, Chasselas de Fontainebleau, Chasselas de Jalabert, Chasselas de la Contrie, Chasselas de la Naby, Chasselas de Moissac, Chasselas de Montauban, Chasselas de Mornain, Chasselas de Pondichéry, Chasselas de Pontchartrain, Chasselas de Pouilly, Chasselas de Quercy, Chasselas de Rappelo, Chasselas de Tenerife, Chasselas de Teneriffe, Chasselas de Thomery, Chasselas de Toulaud, Chasselas de Vaud, Chasselas di Fountanbleau, Chasselas di Thomery, Chasselas Dorada, Chasselas Dorato, Chasselas Dore, Chasselas Dore Hatif, Chasselas Dore Salomon, Chasselas du Doubs, Chasselas du Portugal, Chasselas du Roi, Chasselas du Serail, Chasselas du Thor, Chasselas Dugommier, Chasselas Dur, Chasselas Fendant, Chasselas Hatif de Tenerife, Chasselas Haute Selection, Chasselas Jalabert, Chasselas Jaune Cire, Chasselas Piros, Chasselas Plant Droity, Chasselas Queen Victoria, Chasselas Reine Victoria, Chasselas Salsa, Chasselas Tokay Angevine, Chasselas Vert de la Cote, Chasselas White, Chasselat, Chrupka, Chrupka Biela, Chrupka Bila, Common Muscadine, Danka Belaya, Dinka Belaya, Dinka blanche, Dobrorozne, Doppelte Spanische, Dorin, Doucet, Eau Douce blanche, Edelschoen, Edelwein, Edelweiss, Edelxeiss, Elsaesser, Elsasser Weiss, Fabian, Fabiantraube, Fábiánszőlő, Fehér Chasselas, Fehér Fábiánszőlő, Fehér gyöngyszőlő, Fehér ropogós, Fendant, Fendant blanc, Fendant Roux, Fendant vert, Florenci Jouana, Fondan Belyi, Franceset, Franceseta, Frauentraube, Gamet, Gelber Gutedel, Gemeiner Gutedel, Gentil blanc, Gentil vert, Golden Bordeaux, Golden Chasselas, Grossblaettrige Spanische, Grosse Spanische, Grosser Spaniger, Gruener Gutedel, Gutedel, Gutedel Weiss, Gutedel Weisser, Gyöngyszőlő, Junker, Koenigs Gutedel, Kracher, Krachgutedel, Krachmost, Lardot, Lourdot, Maisa, Marzemina bianca, Marzemina Niduca, Morlenche, Mornan blanc, Mornen, Mornen blanc, Most, Most Rebe, Moster, Pariser Gutedel, Perlan, Pinzutella, Plamenka Belyi, Plant de Toulard, Plant de Toulaud, Plemenika Praskava, Plemenka, Plemenka Bela, Plemenka Rana, Pleminka Biela, Praskava, Pruscava Biela, Queen Victoria, Queen Victoria White, Raisin D'officier, Ranka, Rebe Herrn Fuchses, Reben Herm Fuchs, Reben Herrn, Rheinrebe, Rosmarinentraube, Rosmarintraube, Royal Muscadine, Sasla, Sasla Bela, Schoenedel, Shasla Belaya, Shasla Dore, Shasla Lechebnaya, Shasla Viktoria, Silberling, Silberweiss, Silberweissling, Silberwissling, Strapak, Suessling, Suesstraube, Sweetwater, Sweetwater White, Temprano, Temprano blanco, Terravin, Tribi Vognoble, Tribiano Tedesco, Ugne, Uslechtile Bile, Valais blanc, Viala, Viviser, Waelsche, Waelscher, Weisser Gutedel, Weisser Krachgutedel, White Chasselas, White Muscadine, White Sweetwater, White Van der Laan, Zlahtina, Zlahtnina, Zlahtnina Bijela, Zlatina, and Zupljanka	Switzerland (?)		4013 (Switzerland, 2009), 1123 (Germany)	
Chenel		South Africa	Chenin blanc × Trebbiano		late 20th century
Chenin blanc / Pineau de la Loire / Steen	Agudelo (in Spain), Agudillo (Spain), Anjou, Blanc d'Aunis, Blanc d'Anjou, Capbreton blanc (Landes, France), Confort, Coue Fort, Cruchinet, Cugnette, Feher Chenin, Franc blanc (Aveyron, France), Franche, Gamet blanc (Aveyron, France), Gros Chenin (in Maine-et-Loire and Indre-et-Loire), Gros Pineau (in Touraine), Gros Pinot Blanc de la Loire, Gout Fort, Luarskoe, Pineau d'Anjou (in Mayenne), Pineau de Briollay, Pineau de la Loire (in Indre-et-Loire), Pineau de Savennières, Pineau Gros, Pineau Gros de Vouvray, Pineau Nantais, Plant d'Anjou (in Indre-et-Loire), Plant de Brézé, Plant de Salces, Plant de Salles, Plant du Clair de Lune, Quefort, Rajoulin, Ronchalin, Rouchelein, Rouchelin (in Gironde and Périgord), Rouchalin, Rougelin, Steen (South Africa), Stein, Tête de Crabe, Vaalblaar Stein and Verdurant.	France	Savagnin × ?	9828 (France, 2008), 18852 (South Africa, 2008), 7223 (United States, 2010), 610 (Australia), 124 (New Zealand, 2008)	9th century.
Clairette	AG Cleret, AG Kleret, Blanc Laffite, Blanket, Blanquette, Blanquette De Limoux, Blanquette du Midi, Blanquette Velue, Bon Afrara, Bou Afrara, Branquete, Cibade, Clairette, Clairette d'Aspiran, Clairette De Limoux, Clairette De Trans, Clairette Pointue, Clairette Pounchoudo, Clairette verte, Clarette, Clerette, Colle Musquette, Cotticour, Feher Clairette, Feher Kleret, Gaillard blanc, Granolata, Klaretto bianko, Kleret, Kleret Belyi, Kleret de Limu, Muscade, Osianka, Ousianka, Ovsyaika, Ovsyanka, Petit blanc, Petit Kleret, Petite Clairette, Poupe De Gate, Pti Blan d'Obena, Seidentraube, Shalos Zolotistyi, Uva Gijona, Vivsianka, Vivsyanca and Vivsyanka.	France		3000 (France 1990s)	
Claret de Gers / Claret de Gascogne					
Claverie	Bouguieu, Chalosse Blanche, Chaloussenc, Clabarien, Clabérieu, Clabéria, Claverie Blanc and Claverie vert.	France			
Cococciola	Cacciola, Cacciuolo and Cociumella.	Italy			
Cocur					
Coda di Pecora	Coda di Volpe	Italy		1027 (Italy, 2000)	
Coda di Volpe / Guarnaccia bianca	Alopecis, Cianca rossa, Coada Vulpi, Coda di Pecora, Coda di Volpe bianca, Coda di Volpe de Maddaloni, Coda di Vulpe durante, Crapettone, Durante, Falerno, Guarnaccia bianca, Lisica opasca bjelaja, Lisitcha opachka biala, Pallagrello and Pallegrello bianco.	Italy			
Colombard	Bardero, Blanc Emery, Blanquette, Bon blanc, Koejawel bom, Chabrier vert, Charbrier vert, Colombar, Colombeau, Colombie, Colombier, Coulombier, Cubzadais, Donne rousse, Donne verte, French Colombard, Gros Blanc Doux, Gros Blanc Roux, Guenille, Kolombar, Martin Cot, Pied Tendre, Quene Tendre, Quene vert, Queue Tendre, Queue verte, and West's White Prolific.	France	Gouais blanc × Chenin blanc		
Completer	Lafnaetscha, Lafnetscha, Lafnetsela, Lindauer, Malans, Malanstraube, Malanstraube Weisse, Räuschling Edelweiss, Zürichersee, Zürichseer, Zürirebe, and Zürichersee.	Switzerland			
Cortese	Bianca Fernanda, Corteis, Cortese Bianca, Cortese Bianco, Cortese d'Asti, Cortese dell'Astigliano, Courteis, Cortesi, Courteisa, Fernanda Bianca, and Raverusto.	Italy		7800 (Italy, 2000)	1650s
Crato / Crato bianco					
Courbu / Xuri Zerratua / Bordelesa Zuri	Bordeleza Zuria, Chacoli Zuria, Cougnet, Courbeau, Courbi blanc, Courbies, Courbis, Courbu, Courbu Gros, Courbut, Courbut blanc, Courtoisie, Ondaria Zuria and Vieux Pacherenc.	France			
Criolla Grande	Criolla Grande Sanjuanina, Criolla San Juanino, Criolla Sanjuanina, Italia, Sanjuanina Rosada, and Uva Tierna.	Argentina	Mission (grape) × Muscat of Alexandria	22500 (Argentina, 2006)	
Crouchen / Clare Riesling / Cape Riesling	Basque, Cape Riesling, Cheri Cerratia, Clare Riesling, Cougnet, Crochenta, Crouchen Blanc, Cruchen, Cruchen Blanc, Cruchenta, Cruchenton Blanc, Grand Blanc, Kaapse Riesling, Messanges Blanc, Navarre Blanc, Paarl Riesling, Riesling, Riesling Vert, S. A. Riesling, Sable Blanc, Sales Blanc, Trouchet Blanc, and Zurizerratia.	France		420 (Australia, 1990s), 3200 (South Africa)	
Pearl of Csaba	Csaba gyöngye, Csabagyöngye, Perla Czabanska, Perla di Csaba, Perle di Csaba, Perle von Csaba, жэмчуг сабa/Zhemchug csaba, Венгерский мускатный ранний/Vengerskiy muskatnyy ranniy	Hungary	Irsai Olivér × Mátrai muskotály		1905
Cserszegi fűszeres		Hungary	Irsai Olivér × Roter Traminer		1960
Cygne blanc		Australia	Cabernet Sauvignon	2 (Australia)	1989
Dattier					
Debina	Dempina, Ntempina, and Zitsa.	Greece			
Debit		Croatia			
Diagalves					
Dimiat	Ahorntraube, Beglerdia, Beglezsia, Bekaszaju, Bekaszölö, Belezsi, Belina, Belina krupna, Belogollandskii, Belogollanskii, Bemena, Bois Jaune, Damiat, Damjat, Damjat bial, Debela lipovina, Dertonia, Dertonija, Dertonilia, Dimiate, Dimjat, Drobna Lipovscina, Dymiat, Fehér Szemendriai, Galan, Koplik, Krupna belina, Laschka, Laska belina, Mana Kuki, Misket de Silven, Misket Slivenski, Nagyvögü, Pamid, Pamit, Parmac, Plovdina, Plovdina esküska, Plovdina eskulska, Saricibuk, Plovdiska, Podbelec, Podbeuz, Radoviska plovdina, Roscara, Rosiora, Saratchobok, Saridzibuk, Semendra, Semendria, Semendru, Senederevka, Smederevka, Smederevka bianca, Smederevka bijela, Smederevka white, Szemendriai féher, Szemendriai Zöld, Szemendrianer, Tök szöllö, Töksölö, Tökszölö, Töröklugas, Wippacher, Wippacher ahornblättrig, Yapalaki, Zarja, Zmedervka, Zoumiatico, Zoumiatis, Zumjat, Zumjatiko and Zumyat.	Bulgaria	Gouais blanc × ?	9600 (Bulgaria, 2005)	
Dinka	Bakar, Chtein Chiler, Crvena Dinka, Crvena Ruzica, Dinka Crvena, Dinka Mala, Dinka Rouge, Fleichstraube, Fleischtraube, Hajnalpiros, Kamena Dinka, Kamenoruziak Cerveny, Kamenoruzijak Cerveni, Kevidinka, Kövidinka, Kövidinka Rose, Kövidinka Rosovaia, Kövis Dinka, Kovidinka, Kovidinka Rose, Kovidinka Rozovaya, Kubinyi, Mala Dinka, Pankota, Pirca Voeroes, Piros Koevidinka, Raisin de Rose, Rosentraube, Roujitsa, Rusica, Ruzhitsa, Ruzica, Ruzica Crvena, Ruzike Cervena, Ruzsica, Ruzsitza, Schiller, Shtein Shiller, Sremska Ruzica, Steinschiller, Steinschiller Rother, Steinschiller Roz, Vörös Dinka, Vorosz Dinka, Werschätzer, and Werschatzer.	Hungary			
Doña Blanca	Alvaro de Soire, Alvaro de Sousa, Boal, Boal Cachudo, Colhao de Gallo, Dame Blanche, Doña Branca, Graciolo, Graciosa, Graziolo, Malvasia Branca, Malvasia Grosso, Moza Fresca, Santo Estevao, Valenciana, Voal Cachudo and Voal Esparrapado	Spain / Portugal			
Donzelinho branco	Donzellinho branco, Donzelyhno, Terrantes and Terrantez.	Portugal		42 (Portugal, 2010)	16th century
Doradilla (grape)		Spain			
Doradillo		Spain			
Drupeggio	Bottaio bianco (in Tuscany), Cacinello, Cacciumo (in the province of Campobasso in Molise), Canaiolo bianco, Canajola, Canina (in the province of Ascoli Piceno in the Marche), Drupeccio (in Orvieto), Lupeccio, Trupeccio (in Orvieto), Uva dei Cani (in Ascoli Piceno) and Volpicchio (in Tuscany).	Italy		674 (Italy, 2000)	1817
Durella	Cagnina, Duracino, Durella bianca, Durello, Durelo, Durola bianca, Rabbiosa, Rabiosa, Rabiosa di Asolo, and Raboso Piava	Italy			
Ehrenfelser		Germany	Riesling × Silvaner(?)	112 (Germany, 2006)	1929
Elbling	Albana, Albe, Alben, Albig, Albuelin, Albuelis, Allemand, Allemand Blanc, Alsacien, Alva, Argentin, Biela Zrebnina, Bielovacka, Bielovcka, Blesec, Blesez, Bourgeois, Burgauer, Burgeger, Burgegger, Burger, Burger Elbling, Burgundertraube Gruen, Burgyre, Dickelbling, Elbai Feher, Elbe, Elbele, Elben, Elben Feher, Elber, Elbling Weiss, Elbinger, Elmene, Facum, Facun, Facun Blanc, Farantbily, Faucun, Frankenthal Blanc, Gemeine Traube, Geschlachter Burger, Gonais Blanc, Gouais Blanc, Grobburger, Grobe, Grobriesling, Gros Blanc, Grossriesler, Grossriesling, Hartalbe, Haussard, Herblink, Heunisch Gruen, Isodora Brachybus, Klaemmer, Kleinbeer, Kleinbeere, Kleinberger, Klember, Klemmer, Klemplich, Kratkopeccelj, Kristaller, Kristeller, Kurzstingel, Kurzstingl, Kurzstingler, Le Gros, Luttenbershna, Marmont Vert, Marmot, Mehlweisse, Morawka, Mouillet, Naesslinger, Nuernberger Zaeh, Nuesslinger, Pecek, Pezhech, Pezhek, Plant Commun, Plant Madame, Raifrench, Rauhelbene, Reinfransch, Rheinalben, Rheinelbe, Seretonina, Silberweiss, Silvaner Weiss, Spizelbe, Srebonina, Suessgrober, Suessgrobes, Sussgrober, Tarant Bily, Tarant De Boheme, Verdin Blanc, Vert Blanc, Vert Doux, Weissalbe, Weisselben, Weisselbling, Weisser Dickelbling, Weisser Elbling, Weisser Sylvaner, Welsche, Welschel.	Germany / Luxembourg	Gouais blanc × Traminer × ?	583 (Germany, 2006)	Roman empire
Emerald Riesling	California 1139 E 29, Emerald Rizling, and Riesling Izumrudnii	US	Riesling × Muscadelle		1936 / 1948
Emir Karasi					
Encruzado	Salgueirinho	Portugal			
Erbaluce	Alba Lucenti, Albaluce, Albe Lucenti, Ambra, Bianc Rousti, Bianchera, Bianco Rusti, Erba Luce, Erbaluce bianca, Erbalucente, Erbalucente bianca, Erbalus, Erbcalon, Greco Novarese, Repcalon, Trebbiano Gentile, Trebbiano Perugino, Trebbiano Verde dell'Umbria, Uva Rustia, Uva Rustica, and Vernazza di Gattinara.	Italy			Early 17th century
Esquitxagos					
Escanyavella		Spain			
Ezerjó	Biella, Budai Feher, Budicsin, Budicsina, Cirfondli, Ezer Jo, Feher Bakator, Feher Budai, Feher Sajgo, Feher Szagos, Frank, Kerekes, Kolmreifer, Kolmreifler, Konreifler, Korpavai, Korponai, Korponoi, Matyok, Predobre, Refosco, Refosco Weiss, Romandi, Satoki, Scheinkern, Scheinkernweiss, Shaikern, Staloci, Szadocsina, Szadoki, Szatoki, Szatoky, Tausendfachgute, Tausendgerte, Tausendgut, Tausendgute, and Trummertraube.	Hungary			
Faber / Faberrebe		Germany	Pinot blanc × Müller-Thurgau	689 (Germany, 2006)	1929
Falanghina	Biancazita, Biancozita, Biancuzita, Falanchina, Falanchina Bianca, Falanghina Verace, Falenghina, Falernina, Falerno Veronese, Fallanchina, Fallanghina, Folanghina, Montecalvo, Montellese, and Uva Falerna	Italy			
False Pedro / Pedro Luis / Cañocazo					
Farana					
Favorita		Italy			1964
Fernao Pires / Fernão Pires	Camarate, Fernam Pires, Fernan Piriz, Fernão Pirão, Fernao Pires, Fernão Pires do Beco, Gaeiro, Gaieiro, Maria Gomes, and Molinha.	Portugal			
Ferral					
Fetească albă / Fetiaska / Leànyka	Baratik, Bulgarien Feteasca, Devcenco Hrozno, Devicii Belii, Dievcenske Hrozno, Dievcie Hrozno, Divci Hrozen, Fehér Leányka, Feniaska Belaii, Fetiasca Alba, Fetiasca Belii, Fetiaska Alba, Fetisoara, Fetjaska Belaja, Fetyaska, Fetyaska Belaya, Fetyaska Koroleva, Fetysare, Janyszölde, Jányszőlő, Kanigl Weiss, Lányszőlő, Leanicazea, Leanika, Leánka, Leány Szőlő, Leányka, Leanyszölde, Leányszőlő, Lyan Szölö, Mädchentraube, Medhentraube, Paparyaska, Parsaryaska, Pasareasca Alba, Pasarjaska, Peseryaska, Poama Fetei, Poama Fetei Alba, Poama Pasareasca, Roszas Leányka, Rumänien Feteasca, Udssr Fetjaska, Ungarn Leanyka, Varatik	Romania		900 (Moldova)	
Fetească regală	Danasana, Danesana, Danosi, Danosi Leányka, Dunesdorfer Königsast, Dunesdörfer Königsast, Dunnesdiorfer, Erdei Sárga, Feteasca Corolevscaia, Feteasca de Danes, Feteasca Korolevskaia, Feteasca Muscatnaia, Feteasca Muskatnaia, Feteasca Regola, Galbena de Ardeal, Galbena di Ardeal, Kenigrast, Kiraileanka, Királyleányka, Königliche Mädchentraube, Königsast, Königstochter, Konigsast, Kralovska Leanka, Pesecka Leanka.	Romania / Moldova	Grasa × Fetească albă		1930s
Fiano	Apiana, Apiano, Fiana, Fiano di Avellino, Fiore Mendillo, Foiano, Latina Bianca, Latina Bianca di Barletta, Latino, Latino Bianco, Minutola, Minutolo, and Santa Sofia.	Italy			ancient
Fié / Fiét / Fié gris					
Findling		Germany	Müller-Thurgau		
Flora		United States	Semillon × Gewürztraminer		1938
Fologosão					
Folle blanche / Gros Plant / Piquepoult	Amounedat, Bordelais, Bouillon, Burageat, Came Braque, Camobraque, Canut, Canut du Lot et Garonne, Chalosse blanche (in the Gers and Landes region), Chalot, Dame blanc, Dame blanche (in the Lot-et-Garonne region), Damery, Engreat blanc, Enrachat, Enragé (in the Gironde), Enrageade, Enrageat (in the Gironde), Enrageat blanc, Feher Folle, Fol, Fol Belyi, Folle (in the Charente), Folle De Bordeaux, Fou, Fütterer, Grais, Grais Bouillon, Gros Meslier, Gros Plant (in the Pay Nantais and Vendée), Grosse Blanquette, Grosse Chalosse, Matza Zuri (in País Vasco), Mendic, Mendik, Mondic, Mune Mahatsa (in País Vasco), Petit Verjus, Pic Pouille blanc, Picpouille, Picpoul, Picpoule, Picpoult d'Armagnac, Picpout, Picquepouille, Piquepoul (in Gascony), Piquepoul du Gers (in Lot-et-Garonne), Piquepoult, Piquepout, Plant de Dame, Plant de Madame, Plant de Madone, Pochelle blanche, Rebauche, Rochelle blanc, Rochelle blanche, Rochelle verte, Roumain, Taloche du Lot, Talosse, and Ugne blanche.	France	Gouais blanc × ?	1770 (France, 2009)	1696
Forastera	Ferestiera, Forastera blanca, Forastiera, Forestera, Forestiera, Forestiero, Frastera, Furastera, Furastiera and Uva dell'Isola (on the island of Procida)	Italy		102 (Italy, 2000)	1877
Forastera (Spanish grape)		Spain			
Francavida					
Francusa					
Freisamer / Freiburger	Freiburg 25-1 or Fr. 25-1 and the synonym Freiburger	Germany	Pinot gris × Silvaner	4 (Germany, 2008)	1916
Fromenteau		France			medieval times.
Furmint / Mosler / Sipon	Allgemeiner, Alte Sestrebe, Arany Furmint, Beregi Furmint, Bieli Moslavac, Biharboros, Bihari Boros, Budai Goher, Cimigera, Csapfner, Csillagviraga Furmint, Damzemy, Demjen, Domjen, Edelweisser Tokayer, Edler weisser Furmint, Féher Furmint (in Tokaj), Formint, Formont, Fourminte, Furmint bianco, Furmint de Minis, Furmint Féher, Furmint Szagos, Furmint Valtozo, Gelber Moster, Gemeiner, Görgeny, Görin, Goher Féher, Gorin, Grasă de Cotnari, Holyagos Furmint, Jardanszki Furmint, Keknyelü, Keresztesevelu Furmint, Kiraly Furmint, Krhkopetec, Lazafürtű Furmint (in Tokaj), Ligetes Furmint, Luttenberger, Madarkas Furmint, Mainak, Maljak, Malmsey, Malnik, Malvasia verde, Malvoisie verte, Malzak, Mehlweiss, Moscavac bijeli, Moslavac, Moslavac bijeli, Moslavac zuti, Moslavina, Mosler (in Austria), Mosler gelb, Mosler gelber, Moslertraube, Moslovac (in Croatia), Moslovez, Nemes Furmint, Poam Grasa, Poma Grasa, Poshipon, Pošip, Pošipbijeli, Pošipveliki, Pošip Vrgonski, Posipel, Posipon, Pospisel, Rongyos Furmint, Salver, Sari Furmint, Sauvignon Vert, Schimiger, Schmiger, Seestock, Seeweinrebe, Shipo, Shipon, Shiponski, Sipelj, Šipon (in Slovenia and northern Croatia), Som (in Transylvania), Som shipo, Somszölö, Szala, Szalai, Szalai janos, Szalay Göreny, Szegszolo, Szegzölö, Szigethy Szöllö, Szigeti, Toca, Toca Tokai, Tokai Krupnyi, Tokaiskii, Tokaisky, Tokaijer, Tokay (in France), Tokayer, Ungarische, Weisslabler, Weisslauber, Zapfete, Zapfner, Zopfner (in Germany) and Zilavka.	Hungary	Gouais Blanc	4006 (Hungary, 2006), 694 (Slovenia, 2009), 422 (Croatia, 2008),	1571
Galego Dourado					
Garganega / Grecanico / Grecanio	D'Oro, Decanico, Dorana di Venetia, Garganega Comune, Garganega di Gambellara, Garganega Gentile, Garganega Grossa, Garganega Piramidale, Garganega Veronese, Gracanico Dorato, Grecani, Grecanico, Grecanico Bianco, Grecanico Dorato, Grecanicu Biancu, Grecanio, Greccanico, Lizzara, Malvasia de Manresa, Ora, Oro, Ostesa, Ostesona, and Recanicu.	Italy			
Garnacha blanca / Grenache blanc	Belan, Feher Grenache, Garnacha blanca (Spanish), Garnatxa blanca (Catalan), Vernatxa blanca (Catalan) in Tierras del Ebro, Rool Grenache, Silla blanc, Sillina blanc, and White Grenache	Spain	Grenache		
Gewürztraminer / Tramini / Traminac	Auvernas rouge, Blanc brun, Blanc Court, Bon blanc, Christkindeltraube, Christkindlestraube, Clevener, Clevner, Crevena Ruziva, Crovena Ruzica, Dišeči Traminec, Dreimaenner, Dreimannen, Dreipfennigholz, Drumin, Drumin Ljbora, Duret rouge, Edeltraube, Fermentin rouge, Fleischroth, Fleischweiner, Formentin rouge, Fourmenteau rouge, Frencher, Fromente, Fromenteau, Fűszeres, Fűszeres Tramini, Gentil Rose Aromatique, Gentil-duret rouge, Gentile blanc, Gertie, Gewuerztraminer, Gringet, Gris rouge, Haiden, Kirmizi Traminer, Klaebinger, Klaevner, Kleinbraun, Kleinwiener, Livora, Livora Cervena, Mala Dinka, Marzimmer, Mirisavi Traminac, Nature, Nature rose, Noble rose, Nuernberger Rot, Pinat Cervena, Piros Tramini, Plant Paien, Princ Cerveny, Princt Cervena, Princt Cerveny, Ranfoliza, Rosentraminer, Rotclevner, Rotedel, Roter Nuerberger, Roter Nuernberger, Roter Traminer, Rotfranken, Rothklauser, Rothweiner, Rothwiener, Rotklaevler, Rotklaevner, Rotklevner, Rousselet, Runziva, Rusa, Ruska, Ryvola, Salvagnin, Sauvagnin, Savagnin, Savagnin jaune, Savagnin Rosa Aromatique, Savagnin rose, Savagnin Rose Aromatique, Savagnin Rose Musque, St. Klauser, Termeno Aromatico, Tramin Cerveny, Tramin Korenny, Traminac Crveni, Traminac Diseci, Traminac mirisavi (Croatian), Traminac Mirisavi Crveni, Traminac Sivi, Traminec, Traminer, Traminer Aromatico, Traminer Epice, Traminer Musque, Traminer Parfume, Traminer rosa, Traminer Rose Aromatique, Traminer Rot, Traminer Rozovyi, Tramini Piros and Trammener.	France	Savagnin blanc		
Girgentina	Ghirghentina, Insolja tal-Girgenti	Malta			
Giró blanc	Giró blanco and Giró Roz.	Spain		6 (Majorca, 2012)	
Gloria					
Godello	Agodello, Agodenho, Agudanho, Agudelha, Agudelho, Agudello, Agudelo, Agudenho, Berdello, Godelho, Godella, Godenho, Ojo de Gallo and Trincadente.	Spain		1153 (Spain, 2008)	
Goldburger	Klosterneuburg 16-8 and Orangeriesling.	Austria	Welschriesling × Orangetraube		1922
Goldriesling	Goldmuskat, Riesling Doré, Riesling Khativ and Risling Zolotistyi.	France	Riesling × Courtillier Musqué Précoce		1893
Gouais blanc	Absenger, Bauernweinbeer, Bauernweinbeere Weiss, Bauernweintraube, Debela, Drobna, Best's N°4, Blanc De Serres, Boarde, Bogatyur, Bon Blanc, Bordenauer, Borzenauer, Bouillan, Bouillaud, Bouilleaud, Bouillen, Bouillenc, Bourgeois, Bourguignon, Branestraube, Branne, Burgegger Weiss, Burger, Cagnas, Cagnou, Champagner Langstielig, Colle, Coulis, Dickweisser, Dickwiss, Enfarine Blanc, Esslinger, Figuier, Foirard Blanc, Frankenthaler, Gau, Gauche Blanc, Geuche Blanc, Goe, Goet, Gohet, Goi, Goin, Goix, Got, Gouai, Gouais Jaune, Gouais Long, Gouais Rond, Gouas, Gouaulx, Gouay, Gouche, Gouche Blanche, Goue, Gouest, Gouest Sauge, Gouet Blanc, Gouette, Gouge, Gouget Blanc, Gouillaud, Gouis De Mardeuil, Gousse, Grauhuensch, Grobe, Grobes, Grobheunisch, Grobweine, Grobweisse, Gros Blanc, Grünling, Guay Jaune, Gueche Blanc, Guest Salviatum, Gueuche Blanc, Guillan, Guinlan, Guy, Guy Blanc, Gwaess, Harthuensch, Hartuensch, Heinisch, Heinish, Heinsch, Heinschen Weiss, Hennische Weiss, Hensch, Heunisch Blanc, Heunisch Weisser, Heunischtraube, Heunish Weiss, Heunsch, Heunscher, Heunschler, Heunschlir, Hinschen, Hinschene, Hintsch, Huensch, Huenschene, Huentsch, Hunnentraube, Hunsch, Hunschrebe, Huntsch, Hyntsch, Issal, Issol, Kleinbeer, Kleinberger, Laxiertraube, Lombard Blanc, Luxiertraube, Mehlweisse, Mehlweisse Gruen, Mendic, Moreau Blanc, Mouillet, Nargouet, Pendrillart Blanc, Petit Gouge, Pichons, Plant De Sechex, Plant Madame, Plant Seche, President, Regalaboue, Riesling Grob, Rous Hette, Roussaou Blanc, Rudeca Saboule Boey, Sadoule Boey, Sadoulo Bouyer, Seestock Grob, Tejer Szozeloe, Thalburger, Trompe Bouvier, Trompe Valet, Verdet, Verdin Blanc, Vionnier, Weisse Traube, Weisser Heunisch, Weissgrobe, Weissheinsch, Weissstock, Weisstock, Wippacher, Zoeld Hajnos				Ancient
Graisse / Plant de Graisse	Blanquette, Blanquette grise, Cargo saoumo, Cargo saumo, Chalosse, Cholosse, Clairette égreneuse, Cotiblanc, Cotilblanc, Gras, Gras blanc, Grecho, Gros blanc, Jalosse, Mendic, Plant de graisse, Plant de Grecho, Plant de Mun, Président, Ramassaou blanc, Ramassou blanc, Taloche, Tizourine bou-aferara blanc and Tizourine bou-afrara.	France			
Grasă de Cotnari	Kövérszőlő, Resertraube	Romania / Moldova			1470s
Grechetto	Greca del Piemonte, Grecherello, Grechetto bianco, Grechetto di Todi, Grechetto Nostrale, Greco, Greco bianco di Perugia, Greco Gentile, Greco Spoletino, Montanarino Bianco, Montanaro, Occhietto, Pignoletto, Pistillo, Pizzinculo, Pocinculo, Pulce, Pulcincolo, Pulcinculo bianco, Pulcinculu, Pulcinella, Stroppa Volpe, Strozza Volpe, Strozzavolpe, and Uva di San Marino.	Greece			
Greco bianco	Balsamina Bianca, Biancame, Greco Biondello, Greco Castellano, Greco delle Torre, Greco del Vesuvio, Greco di Gerace, Greco di Napoli, Greco di Tufo, Greco Maceratino, Greco Moneccio, Grecula, Grecu Niuru, Grieco, Gieco, Grecau, Montecchiese, Morbidella, Ragusano Bianco, Sambiase, and Verdicchio near	Greece		1000 (Italy, 2006)	Ancient
Green Hungarian	Aramon du Nord, Bela Pelesovna, Bela Selenika, Belline, Bockseckel, Butschera, Elender, Glockauer, Grüne (Selena) Pelesovna, Gyöngy Szölö, Gyöngyszölö, Heinisch Rot, Hinschen Weiss, Lelt Szoeloe, Misera, Perlentraube, Putchir, Putscheere Bleu, Putscher, Putzcheere, Putzscheere, Raifler, Rothinsch, Rothreifler, Sauerlamper, Talburger, Tokauer, Tokayer, Treitsche, Ungar, Weisser Tokayer, and Zuti Krhkopetec.	Hungary			
Grenache gris	Abundante, Aleante, Aleantedi Rivalto, Aleante Poggiarelli, Alicant Blau, Alicante, Alicante Grenache, Aragones, Bois Jaune, Cannonaddu, Cannonadu Nieddu, Cannonau, Cannonau Selvaggio, Canonazo, Carignane rosso, Elegante, Francese, Gamay del Trasimeno, Gamay Perugino, Garnaccho negro, Garnacha Comun, Garnacha negra, Garnacha Roja, Garnacha tinta, Garnatxa negra, Garnatxa Pais, Gironet, Granaccia, Granaxa, Grenache noir, Grenache rouge, Kek Grenache, Lladoner, Mencida, Navaro, Navarra, Navarre de la Dordogne, Navarro, Negru Calvese, Ranconnat, Red Grenache, Redondal, Retagliadu Nieddu, Rivesaltes, Roussillon Tinto, Roussillon, Rouvaillard, Sans Pareil, Santa Maria de Alcantara, Tentillo, Tintella, Tintilla, Tinto Menudo, Tinto Navalcarnero, Tai rosso, Toledana, Uva di Spagna, and Vernatxa.	Spain	Grenache	40034 (Aragon, Spain)	
Grignolino	Arlandino, Balestra, Barbesino, Barbesinone, Barbezina, Barbisone d'Espagne, Barbosina de Bologne, Girodino, Girrodino, Grignolino Comune, Grignolino Fino Nero, Grignolino Grosso Nero, Grignolino Rosato, Grignolino Rosso, Grugnolino, Grugnolino Pisano, Nebbiolo Rosato, Neretto di Marengo, Pollasecca, Rosetta, Rossello, Rossetto, Rossetto Cites, and Verbesino.	Italy			
Grillo / Riddu / Rossese bianco		Italy			
Grk Bijeli	Gark, Gherk Blanc, Ghrk, Grk, Grk Korčulanski, Grk Mali, Grk Veli, Korčulanski.	Croatia			
Grolleau gris	Grolleau, Groslot de la Thibaudière, and Groslot gris.	France	Grolleau		19th century.
Gros Manseng / Izkiriota Handi	Gros Mansenc Blanc, Gros Manseng Blanc, Ichiriota Zuria Handia, Ichiriota Zuriahandla, Manseng Gros Blanc, Petit-Mansenc.	France			
Grüner Veltliner	Bielospicak, Cima Biancam, Dreimänner, Feherhegyü, Feldlinger, Grauer Veltliner (in Austria), Green Veltliner, Grün Muskateller, Grüne Manhardsrebe, Grüner, Grüner Muskateler (in Austria), Grüner Muskateller (in common usage until the 1930s), Grüner Velteliner, Grüner Weissgipfler, Grüner Weltliner, Grünmuskateller, Gruner Veltliner, Manhardsrebe, Manhardtraube, Manhartsrebe, Mauhardsrebe, Mouhardrebe, Mouhardsrebe, Muskatel, Muskatel Zeleny, Nemes Veltelini, Plinia Austriaca, Ranfol bianco, Ranfol Bijeli, Ranfol Weisser, Rdeci Veltinec, Reifler Weiss, Ryvola Bila, Tarant Bily, Valtelin blanc, Valtelina vert, Valteliner, Valteliner blanc, Valteliner vert, Velteliner Grüner, Velteliner vert, Velteliner Weisser, Veltelini Zöld, Veltlin Zeleny, Veltlinac Zeleni, Veltlinec, Veltliner (in Alto Adige), Veltliner blanc, Veltliner grau (in Austria), Veltliner Grun, Veltliner Gruner, Veltliner Grün, Veltliner verde, Veltlini, Veltlinske Zelené (in Slovakia), Veltlínské Zelené (in Czech Republic), Veltlinski Zelenii, Veltlinsky Vert, Veltlinsky Zeleny, Vetlinac, Vetlinac Zeleni, Weisser Raifler, Weisser Reifler, Weisser Valteliner, Weisser Velteliner, Weisser Veltliner, Weissgipfler (in Austria), Weissgipfler Grüner, Yesil Veltliner, Zeleni Vetlinac (in Slovenia), Zeleny Muskatel, Zleni Veltinac, Zöld Muskotally, Zöld Muskotalynak, Zöld Veltelini (in Hungary), Zöld Velteliny, Zöldveltelini and Zold Veltelini.	Austria(?)	Savagnin × St. Georgener-Rebe	17151 (Austria, 2008), 2120 (Czech Republic)	
Guardavalle					
Gutenborner	Geisenheim 17-52	Germany	Müller-Thurgau × Bicane		1928
Hárslevelű	Budai Goher, Feuille de Tilleul, Frunza de Tei, Frunze de Tei, Gars Levelyu, Garsh Levelyu, Garsleveliu, Garsz Levelju, Gorsh Levelyu, Hachat Lovelin, Harch Levelu, Harchlevelu, Hars Levelu, Hars Levelü, Hárs Levelű, Hars Levelyu, Harslevele, Hárslevele, Harst Leveliu, Harzevelu, Hosszúnyelű Fehér, Kerekes, Kereklevelű, Lämmerschwanz, Lämmerschwanz, Weisser, Lidenblättriger, Lindenblätrige, Lindenblättrige, Lindenblättriger, Lindenblütrige, Lindener, Lipolist, Lipolist Biyali, Lipovina, Musztafer, Nöthab, Tarpai, Tokai, Tokay, and Vörös.	Hungary			
Hondarrabi Zuri		Spain			
Humagne Blanche		Switzerland		30 (Switzerland, 2009)	
Huxelrebe / Courtillier Musqué	Alzey S 3962 or AS 3962.	Germany	Chasselas × Muscat d'Eisenstadt	677 (Germany, 2006)	1927
Incrocio Manzoni		Italy	Glera × Cabernet Sauvignon	169 (Italy, 2000)	1924 - 1930
Irsai Oliver / Irsay Oliver / Irsai Olivér	Aranyló, Aranyló Korai, Carola, Irchai Oliver, Irsai, Irsai Olivér Muskotály, Irshai Oliver, Karola, Korai Aranyló, Muscat Oliver, Muskat Irsai Oliver, Muskat Oliver, Olivér Irsai, Oliver Irsay, Zoeloetistii Rannii, Zolotisti Ranij, Zolotistyi Rannii, Zolotistyi Ranniy, Zolotistyj Rannij, and Zolotisztuej Rannij.	Hungary	Poszonyi Î Pearl of Csaba		1930
Italia		Italy	Bican × Muscat Hamburg		1878 - 1911
Jacquère	Altesse de Saint-Chef, Blanc des Ecoutoux, Buisserate, Cherche, Coufe Chien, Cugnete, Cugnette, Cugniette, Jacquère Blanche, Jacquèrre, Jacquière, Martin Cot, Martin Cot Blanc, Molette de Montmelian, Patois Rossette, Plant de Myans, Plant des Abymes, Redin, Robinet, Rossettin, Roussette, Roussette de Montmelian.	France	Gouais blanc × ?		1000 (France, 1990s)
Jampal					
Juhfark	Bacso, Balatoni Szőlő, Bárányfarkú, Boros, Boros Fehér, Boros Vékonyhéjú, Budai Goher, Coada Oii, Dünnschalige, Durbancs, Durbants, Fehér Boros, Fehérszőlő, Ihfarku, Jufarco, Juhfarks Weisser, Juhfarkú, Juhfarku Gelber, Kukuruztraube, Lämmerschwanz, Mohácsi, Mustafer, Musztafehár, Nyárhajú, Oocji Rep Bili, Pápai, Sarboros, Sárga Boros, Schweifler, Szeplős, Tämmerschwanz Weisser, Tarpai, Török Búza Szőlő, Tokayer Langer Weisser, Vékonyhéjú, and Vinase.	Hungary			
Juwel		Germany	Kerner × Silvaner	30 (Germany, 2000)	
Kanzler		Germany	Müller-Thurgau × Silvaner		
Keknyelu / Kéknyelű		Hungary			
Kerner	Herold Triumpf, Herold Weiss, Schiava Grossa × Riesling Renano WE 25/30, Trollinger × Riesling Renano WE S 25/30, WE S 2530, Weinsberg S 25–30, Weißer Herold	Germany	Trollinger × Riesling	4004 (Germany, 2006)	1929
Knipperle / Klein Rauschling	Beli Kleschiz, Breisgauer Riesling, Colmer, Drobni Kleshiz, Elsaesser, Eltinger, Faktor, Gelber Ortlieber, Kauka Weiss, Kipperle, Klein Rauschling, Kleiner Gelber, Kleiner Methuesser, Klescec, Kleschiz Beli, Knackerle, Kniperle, Libiza, Mali Javor, Metsuesser Klein, Mielleux Petit, Oettlinger, Ortlibi Sarga, Ortlieber, Ortlieber A 2, Ortlieber Früh, Ortlieber Gelb, Ortlieber Grün, Ortlieber Spaet, Ortlieber Weiss, Ortlieber Weisser, Ortliebi, Ortliebske Rane, Ortliebstraube, Petit Mielleux, Raeuschling Klein, Reichenweiberer, Reichenweierer, Reichenweiherer, Rochelle, Rochelle Blanche, Roshel, Rungauer, Sibiza, Türkheimer	France	Gouais blanc × Pinot		1750s
Koshu		Japan			1000 years
Karija l'Osü					
Krstač	Beli Krstac, Bijela Krata, Bijela Loza, Bijela Vinogradarska, Bijeli Krstac, Krata Bijela, Krsta Bijela, Krstac Bijeli, Krstaca Bijela, Krstach Bianco, Loza Bijela, and Vinogradarska Bijela.	Serbia / Montenegro			
Kujundžuša					
Ladikino					
Lado					
Lagarino bianco	Chegarèl and Sghittarella	Italy		Revived	at least early 14th century
Lagorthi		Greece			
Lauzet	Laouset, Lauzet Blanc and Lercat Blanc.	France		near extinction	
Len de l'El / Len de l'Elh / Loin-de-l'oeil	Cavaille, Cavailles, Cavalie, Cavalier, Endelel, Kavale, Kavaler, L'Endelel, Len de l'Elh, Len del El, Lenc de l'El, Lendellet, Loin de l'oeil.	France			
Loureira	Arinto, Branco Redondo, Branco Redondos, Dorado, Dourada, Dourado, False Pedro, Gallego Dourado, Loeireiro Blanco, Loureiro, Loureiro Blanco, Marques, Marquez, and Rutherglen Pedro.	Spain			
Luglienga	Agliana, Agosenga di Aosta, Agostenga, Agostenga di Aosta, Agostinga, Augustaner weiss, Augustauer, Belle Alliance, Blanc de Bovelle, Blanc de Champagne, Blanc de Pagès, Blanc précoce de Kientzheim, Blussard weiss, Blussart weiss, Bona in Ca (in the Trentino wine region), Budazgoher, Buona in casa, Burchardt's Amber Cluster, Busby's Golden Hamburgh, Champion Dore, Charnu, Early Kientzheim, Early Leipzig, Early Green Madeira, Early White Malvasia, Fresa di Mensa, Frueher Grosser Malvasier, Frueher Grosser Gelber Malvasier, Frueher Leipziger, Frueher Orléans, Fruehweisse Zibede, Gelbe Seidentraube, Gosvabne Zhelte, Golden Hamburgh, Gros blanc, Grove End Sweetwater, Guštana (in Slovenia), Hedvanbé zluté, Hodvabné ztlé, Joannen Charnu, Joanenc, Joannenc, Jouanen, Jouanenc (in France), Jouannenc, Jouannene, Juanen, Julliatique blanche, Karmelitanka bijela, Kientsheim, Krim ai Izium, Krim ai Izyum, Krym ai Izyum, Krymskii Rannii Vinograd, Lignan, Lignan blanc (in France), Lignenga (in Piedmont), Lilanica, Limian, Linian, Linian belii, Linian Belyi, Linyan, Linyan Belyi, Lugiadega, Ligiana bianca, Lugliata, Lugliatica (in Piedmont), Luglienca, Luglienco bianco, Luglienga, Luglienga bianka, Luglienga bianca, Luglienga verde, Luglienchis, Lugliolina, Lugliota, Lulienga, Luigese (in Liguria), Madalénen, Madeleine Alb, Madeleine blanche, Madeleine verte de la Dorée, Madlen belii, Madlen Belii Rannii, Margit Fegher, Margit féher, Margit Korai Feher, Meslier, Précoce de Hongrie, Précoce du Vaucluse, Pulsar Belyi, Pulsart blanc, Ragusaner weiss, Raisin de la Saint-Jean, Raisin de Vilmorin, Ranka, Rognaneau, Rumamellas, Saint John's, San Jacopo, Santa Anna di Lipsia, Seidentraube (in Germany and Switzerland), Seidentraube Gelb, Selkovaia Kist, Shelkovaya Kist, St. Anna di Lipsia, Uva Buona in Casa, Uva Pastora, Uva di Sant'Anna (in Piedmont), Vert Précoce de Madère, Vigriega, Waelsch Gelb and Weisser Kilianer	Italy			1329
Lumassina	Mataòssu (disputed) (Note: The Ruffino family claims to be the only producer of Mataòssu, claiming both that Mataòssu and Lumassina are separate (but closely related) varieties, and that other wines labeled Mataòssu are in fact Lumassina. Others state that Mataòssu and Lumassina are different names for the same variety.)		Italy		
Macabeo / Macabeu / Viura	Alcañol, Blanca de Daroca, Charas blanc, Forcalla, Gredelín, Lardot, Listan Andaludschii, Listan Andaluzskii, Lloza, Macaban, Macabeu, Maccabeo, Maccabeou, Maccabeu, Makkobeo, Malvoisie, Provensal, Queue de Renard, Rossan, Subirat, Tokay, Ugni blanc, Viuna, Xarello	Spain		32000 (Spain, 2004), 2800 (France, 2007)	
Maceratino	Aribona, Bianchetta, Bianchetta Montecchiese, Greco, Greco ad acini piccoli, Greco bianco delle Marche, Greco Castellano, Greco delle Marche, Greco Fino, Greco Maceratino, Greco Montecchiese, Maceratese, Matelicano, Montecchiese, Ribona, Uva Stretta, Verdicchio Marina, Verdicchio Marino, Verdicchio Sirolese and Verdicchio Tiroles	Italy			
Madeleine Angevine	Azhupskaja Mladenka, Chasselas de Talhouet, Juliusi Magdolna, Korai Magda, Maddalena Angevina, Madelaine Angevine, Madlen Angevine, Madlen Anzevin, Madlen Anzhevin, Madlen Anzhuiskaya, Madlenka Rana, Magdalene Angevine, Magdalenka Skora, Magdalina Anzhuiskaya, Margitszoeloe, Petrovskii, and Republician	France			1857
Majarcă Albă					
Malagousia / Malagoussia	Malagouzia, Malagoyzia, Malaouzia, Malaoyzia, Melaouzia, and Melaoyzia.	Greece			
Malvar / Lairén		Spain		2500	
Malvasia, includes several sub-varieties		Greece			Ancient.
Mantonico bianco	Mantonacu, Mantonica vera, Mantonico Maclugnese, Mantonico vero, Mantonicu Pizzutella, Mantonicu vera and Mantonacu Viru della Locride.	Italy			1601
Manteudo					
Maria Gomes / Fernão Pires	Camarate, Fernam Pires, Fernan Piriz, Fernão Pirão, Fernao Pires, Fernão Pires do Beco, Gaeiro, Gaieiro, Maria Gomes, and Molinha.	Portugal			
Marsanne	Avilleran, Avilleron, Champagne Piacentina, Ermitage, Ermitage Blanc, Ermitazh, Grosse Roussette, Hermitage, Johannisberg, Marsan Belyi, Marsanne Blanche, Marzanne, Metternich, Rousseau, Roussette de Saint Peray, Roussette Grosse, White Hermitage, and Zrmitazh.	France			
Marzemina bianca	Berzemina di Breganze, Champagna, Champagne, Sampagne and Sciampagna.	Italy	Marzemino × Garganega	83 (2000)	1679
Mauzac	Aiguillon, Becquin, Bekin, Bequin, Blanc Lafitte, Blanquette, Blanquette Aventice, Blanquette de Limoux, Blanquette Sucrée, Caspre, Clairac, Feuille Ronde, Gaillac, Gaillade, Gamet blanc, Manzac, Maousac, Mausac, Maussac, Mauza, Mauza blanca, Meauzac, Moisac, Moissac, Moysac, Mozac, Mozak Belyi, Peron, Perrond, Pied Rond, Plant de Gaillac, Primard, Queue Fort, Queue Roide, and Sudunais.	France		3200 (2000)	
Melon de Bourgogne / Muscadet	Auxerrois Gros, Biaune, Blanc de Nantes, Bourgogne blanche, Bourgogne verde, Bourgogne verte, Bourguignon blanc, Clozier, Feher Nagyburgundi, Feuille Ronde, Gamay blanc, Gamay Blanc à Feuilles Rondes, Gamay Blanc Feuilles Rondes, Game Kruglolistnyi, Gros Auxerrois, Gros blanc, Grosse Saint Marie, Lyonnais, Lyonnaise blanche, Malin blanc, Mele, Melon, Meurlon, Mourlon, Muscadet, Perry, Petit Bourgogne, Petit Muscadet, Petite Biaune, Petoin, Petouin, Picarneau, Plant de Lons-Le-Saulnie, Roussette Basse, Später Weisser Burgunder, and Weisser Burgunder.	France			18th century
Merlot blanc	Merlau blanc, Merlaut blanc and Merlot bianco	France	Merlot		1891
Merseguera / Verdil / Verdosilla	Blanqueta, Blanquilla, Escanyagos, Exquitsagos, Exquitxagos, Gayata, Gayata Blanca, Lanjaron, Lanjaron Claro, Macaban, Macabeo Basto, Marisancha, Marisancho, Marseguera Masadera, Masaguera, Masseguera, Menseguera, Merseguera de Rio, Mersequera, Meseguera, Messeguera, Messeguera Comun, Mezeguera, Mezeyguera, Planta Borda, Planta de Gos, Trova, Uva Planta, Verdosilla, and Verema Blanca.	Spain			
Meslier St-François	Anereau, Annereau, Blanc ramé, Blanc ramet, Bonne blanche, Bordeaux blanc, Chalosse, Chalosse de Bordeaux, François blanc, Gros meslier, Grosse blanche, Meslier, Meslier blanc, Meslier d'Orleans, Meslier de Seine et Oise, Meslier du Gâtinais, Meslier du Gers, Meslier gros, Meslier jaune, Meslier vert, Pelgarie, Pot de vin, Purgarie and Rochelin.	France	Gouais blanc × Chenin blanc		
Mezesfehér					
Minella bianca	Eppula, Minedda bianca, Minnedda bainca, Minnedda bianca, Minnedda bianca de Catane, Minnedda Ianca and Minella.	Italy		86(2000)	1760
Miousap					
Molette	Molette blanche and Molette de Seyssel.	France	Gouais blanc × ?		
Moll					
Montepila					
Montonico bianco	Bottato, Caprone, Ciapparone, Chiapparone, Coppa, Montanaro, Ognone, Racciapollona, Racciapollone, Raccipolluta, Roccipolluta, Roccipoluta, Trebbiano Marchigiano, Trebbiano Montanaro, Uva d'Oro di poggio delle rose, Uva di poggio delle rose, Uva Fermana, Uva Racciapoluta, Uva Roccipolluta and Uva Regno.	Greece	Garganega × ?		
Montu	Bianchetto, Bianchiana, Bianchino, Montoncello, Montonego bianco, Montuni and Montuno.	Italy		1200 (1990)	
Morio-Muskat		Germany	Silvaner × Pinot blanc	541 (2006)	1928
Moscatel Rosada					
Moscato Giallo	Fior d'Arancio (in Padova), Goldenmuskateller (in Bolzano), Goldmuskateller, Moscat, Moscatel (in Trentino), Moscato Cipro, Moscato dalla Siria, Moscato Sirio, Moscato Siro, Muscat du Pays (in the Valais region of Switzerland), Muscat Italien, Muscat vert (in Valais), Muscatedda (in Sicily), Muscato de Goloio, Muskat Dzhiallo and Muskat Zuti.	Italy or Middle East.	Muscat Blanc à Petits Grains	360 (2000)	After 14th century
Moschofilero / Moscophilero	Fileri Tripoleos, Filleri Tripoleos, Moschofilero, Moschophilero, Moscophilero, Mosxofilero, Phileri Tripoleos	Greece			
Mtsvane	Dedali Mtsvane, Dedali Mtzvane, Dedam Kourdzeni, Dedat Kourdzeni, Dedat Kurdzeni, Dedate Koudzeni, Mamali Mtsvane, Mamali Mtsvani, Mamali Mtzvane, Matsvane Kakhetinskii, Matsvani, Mchkhara, Mchknara, Mciknara, Mcvane Kachetinskij, Mcvane Kahetinski, Mtchknara, Mtsvane Kakhetinskii, Mtzvane Kachuri, Mtzvane Kakhetinsky, Mzibani, and Sapena	Georgia			
Müller-Thurgau / Rivaner	Miler Turgau, Müller, Müller-Thurgaurebe, Müllerka, Müllerovo, Müller-Thurgeau, Müllerka, Müllerovo, Riesling-Silvaner, Riesling-Sylvaner, Riesling × Silavaner, Rivaner, Rizanec, Rizlingsilvani, Rizlingszilvani, Rizlingzilvani, Rizvanac, Rizvanac Bijeli, Rizvanec, Rizvaner	Switzerland	Riesling × Madeleine Royale	42000 (WW)	1882
Muscadelle (Tokay in Australia)	Angelicaut, Angelico, Blanc Cadillac, Blanche Douce, Bouillenc Muscat, Buillenc, Cadillac, Catape, Colle, Colle Musquette, Doucanelle, Douzanelle, Enfin, Guepie, Guilan Doux, Guilan Muscat, Guilan Musque, Guillan, Guillan Musque, Guinlhan Musque, Marmesie, Marseillais, Melon de Bougogne, Muscade, Muscadela, Muscadelle de Bordelais, Muscadet, Muscadet Doux, Muscalea, Muscat Fou, Musquette, Pedro Ximenes Krimsky, Raisimotte, Raisin de Musco, Raisinote, Raisinotte, Rousselou, Sauvignon à Gros Grains, Sauvignon Muscadelle, Sauvignon vert, Tokay, Vesparo, and White Angelica.	France	Gouais blanc × ?		
Muscat / Moscato / Misket					3000 BC
Muscat of Alexandria / Moscatell / Zibibbo / Moscatel de Málaga, de Setúbal	Acherfield's Early Muscat, Aggliko, Albillo de Toro, Aleksandrijski Muskat, Alexander Muskat, Alexandriai Muskotally, Alexandrian Frontignan, Alexandriski Muskat, Anglico, Angliko, Apostoliatiko, Argelino, Augibi, Augibi Blanc, Augibi de Muscat, Augibi Muscat, Augihi Muscat, Bornova Misketi, Bowood Muscat, Broccula, Cabas à la Reine, Charlesworth Tokay, Chasselas Fleur d'Oranger, Chasselas Musqué, Cibeben Muskateller, Cibib, Cibib Muskatani Bijeli, Damascener Weiss Muscat, Damaszkuszi Muskotally, Daroczy Musko, Englesiko, Escholada Superba, Fruity Lexia, Gerosolimitana Bianca, Gordo, Gris de Muscat, Hanepoot, Hbiqui, Isidori, Iskenderiye Misketi, Iskendiriye Misketi, Jubi, Jubi Blanc, Kabridja, Kabrija, Kalabrija, Malaga, Malaga Blanc, Malakay, Meski, Moscatel, Moscatel Bianco, Moscatel Blanco, Moscatel de Alejandria, Moscatel de Aleyandria, Moscatel de Chipiona, Moscatel de Espana, Moscatel de Grano Gordo, Moscatel de Jesus, Moscatel de Lanzarote, Moscatel de Malaga, Moscatel de Samso, Moscatel de Setubal, Moscatel de Valencia, Moscatel Flamenco, Moscatel Gordo, Moscatel Gordo Blanco, Moscatel Gorron, Moscatel Groso, Moscatel Malaga, Moscatel Real, Moscatel Roma, Moscatel Romano, Moscatel Romano Blanco, Moscatel Ulmancia, Moscatellone, Moscatelon, Moscatelone, Moscato di Alessandria, Moscato di Calabria, Moscato di Pantellaria, Moscato di Pantelleria, Moscato Gordo, Moscato Romano, Moschato Alexandrias, Moschato Limnou, Muscat, Muscat A Gros Grains, Muscat Bowood, Muscat Caminada, Muscat Candia, Muscat Croquant, Muscat d'Alesandrie, Muscat d'Alexandrie, Muscat d'Alexandrie Blanc, Muscat d'Alexandrie de Raf Raf, Muscat d'Espagne, Muscat de Alexandria, Muscat de Caminada, Muscat de Jerusalem, Muscat de Kelibia, Muscat de Raf-Raf, Muscat de Rivesaltes, Muscat de Roma, Muscat de Rome, Muscat de Sagunto, Muscat de Sale, Muscat Escholata, Muscat Flame, Muscat Gardo, Muscat Gordo Blanco, Muscat Grec, Muscat Llansa, Muscat Primavis, Muscat Romain, Muscat Tynningham, Muscataiu, Muscatdamascener Weiss, Muscatellone di Espagna, Muscato Romano, Muskat Aleksandriiskii, Muskat Etolyata, Muskat Krupni, Muskat Mali, Muskat Rapski, Muskat Veliki, Pais Myuske, Panse Muscade, Panse Muscat, Panse Musque, Panse Musquee, Paradisia, Pasa de Malaga, Pascal Muscat, Passe Muscat, Raisin de Malaga, Raisin du Husaco, Roode Hanepoot, Ryton Muscat, Salamanca, Salamanna, Salamanna Bianca, Salamonica, Seralamanna, Smirnai Szagos, Spanier Weiss, Tamaiioasa de Alexandria, Tokay Musqué, Tottenham Park Muscat, Tynningham Muscat, Uva Aceituna, Vanille Raisin, Vizaca, White Hanepoot, White Muscat of Alexandria, White Muscat of Lunel, White Romain, Zibeben-Muscateller Weisser, Zibibbo, Zibibbo Blanco, Zibibbo di Pantelleria, Zibibbu, Zibibbu di Sicilia, Zihibbo, Zihibbo di Marcellinaria, Zihibbo di Milazzo, Zihibbo di Pantelleria, Zihibbo di Termini, Zihibbo di Trapani, Zihibbo Hianco Moscato, and Zihibbu di Sicilia.	Egypt			
Muscat Blanc à Petits Grains / Tamjanika / Muscat Frontignan / Muskateller / Moscatel branco / Frontignan	Frontignan, and in Serbia and North Macedonia is known as Tamjanika	Greece			
Muscat Ottonel	Chasselas Saint Fiacre, Mirisavka, Mirislavka, Misket Ottonel, Moscato Otonel bianco, Moscato Ottonel, Moscatos, Mozzonel, Muscadel Ottonel (in South Africa), Muscat Otonel blanc, Muscat Otonel White, Muscat Ottone, Muscat Ottonel Weiss, Muscats, Muskat Otonel (in Bulgaria), Muskat Otonel Bijeli, Muskat Otonel Weisser, Muskat Ottonel (in Austria, Germany and Slovenia), Muskotally, Muskotály (in Hungary), Ottonel, Ottonel Frontignan, Ottonel Muscotally, Ottonel Muskotály (in Hungary), Tămîioasă Ottonel, Muscat de Craciunel Tirnave(in Romania) and Tamiioasa Ottonel.	France	Chasselas × Muscat de Saumur		1852
Nasco	Basco Bianco, Nasco Bianco, Nasco di Sardegna, Nascu, Nasko Sardinskii, Nusco, Ogu de Aranna and Resu.	Italy		40 (Italy)	
Neherleschol					
Neuburger	Brubler, Brugler, Feher Neuburger, Feher Neuburgi, Feher Neuburgi Ujvari, Neiburger, Neuburg, Neuburger Alb, Neuburger blanc, Neuburger Weisser, Neuburgi, Neuburgske, Neuburske, Neue Rebe, Neugurger Bijeli, Nojburger, Novogradski, Ujvari, Weisser Neuburger.	Austria	Roter veltliner × Sylvaner		
Nobling	Staatliches Weinbauinstitut Freiburg: FR. 128-40 and Freiburg 128-40	Germany	Silvaner × Chasselas	100 (1970s)	1940
Nosiola		Italy		193 (2000, Italy)	
Nuragus	Abbondosa, Abboudossa, Abbsudosa, Abundans, Aksina de Marjian, Aksina de Popurus, Axina de Margiai, Axina de Popurus, Axina Scacciadeppidus, Bruscu biancu, Burdu, Garna Chchija, Garnaccia, Granazza, Lacconargiu, Malvasia di Luras, Meragus, Nugarus, Nuragus blanc de Sardaigne, Nuragus Moscadeddu, Nuragus Moscatello and Nuragus Trebbiana.	Italy		8700 (1990, Italy)	Ancient
Ondenc	Austenq, Béquin, Bergeracois, Blanc de Gaillac, Blanc Select, Blanc Selection Carrière, Blanquette, Blanquette Sucrée, Chaloche, Chalosse, Cu de Brecherou, Doudant Blanc, Doundent, Dourec, Dourech, Fronsadais, Gaillac, Irvine's White, Mauzac, Œil de Tour, Ondain, Ondainc, Ondent, Ondin, Oundenc, Oundenq, Oustenc, Oustenq, Oustenque, Piquepout de Moissac, Plant de Gaillac, Prendiou, Prentiou, Primai, Primaic, Primard, Printiou, Riverain, Sable Blanc, Semis Blanc, Sencit Blanc, Sensit Blanc, and Sercial.	France			
Optima	Geilweilerhof 33-13-113 and Gf. 33-13-113.	Germany	Riesling × Silvaner	100 (Germany)	1930
Oraniensteiner					
Orion	Geilweilerhof GA-58-30 and Gf. GA-58-30	Germany	Optima × Villard Blanc		1964
Ortega		Germany	Müller-Thurgau × Siegerrebe	686 (Germany, 2006)	1948
Ortrugo	Altrughe, Altrugo, Altrugo de Rovescala, Altrugo de Rovalesca, Artrugo, Barbasina, Barbesina, Barbesino, Barbesino bianco, Barbsin agglomerato, Barbsin bianco, Ortrugo de Rovescala, Trebbiano di Tortona, Vernasino bianco and Vernesina.	Italy		3600 (Italy)	
Oz					
Pagedebit					
Pálava		Czech republic (Moravia)	Gewürztraminer × Müller-Thurgau		1953
Pallagrello bianco	Pallarelli, Pallagrella bianca, Pallagrello di Avellino, Pallarella and Piedimonte bianco.	Italy			1775
Palomino / Listan / Perrum		Portugal			
Pampanuto / Pampanino	La Pampanuta, Pampanino, Pampanuta, Pampanuto di Terlizzi and Rizzulo.	Italy			
Parč					
Pardillo / Pardina		Spain			
Parellada	Martorella, Montonec, Montonech, Montonega, Montoneo, Montonero, Montonet, Parellada blanc, Perelada and Perellada.	Spain		10000 (2004, Spain)	
Pascal blanc	Brun Blanc, Jacobin violet, Ostertraube, Pascal, Pascaou Blanc, Plant Pascal and Plant Pascolu.	France			
Passerina		Italy			
Pecorino / Pecorello	Arquitano, Biancuccia, Bifolchetto, Bifolco, Bifolvo, Dolcipappola, Dolcipappolo, Forcese, Forconese, Iuvino, Juvino, Lanzesa, Moscianello, Mosciolo, Mostarello, Norcino, Pecorella, Pecorello, Pecorello di Rogliano, Pecori, Pecorina, Pecorina Aquitanella, Pecorina Arquatanella, Pecorino Bianco, Pecorino de Arquata, Pecorino di Arquata, Pecorino di Osimo, Piscianello, Piscianino, Promotico, Sgranarella, Stricarella, Striccarella, Trebbiano Viccio, Uva Cani, Uva degli Osti, Uva Dell'occhio Piccola, Uva Delle Donne, Uva Delle Peccore, Uvarella, Uvina, Vecia, Verdicchio Bastardo Bianco, Vissanello and Vissanello bianco.	Italy		87 (2000, Italy)	
Pedro Giménez		Argentina			
Pedro Ximénez/ PX / Alamís	Alamais, Chirones, Corinto bianco, Don Bueno, Jimenez, Pedro, Himenez, Ximénez, Ximénès, Pedro Jimenez (in Andalusia), Pedro Khimenes, Pedro Ximénès, Pedro Ximenes (in Andalusia), Pedro Ximenez, Pedro Ximenez Bijeli, Pedro Ximenes De Jerez, Pedro Ximenez De Montilla, Pedro Ximinez, Pero Ximen, Perrum (in the Alentejo region of Portugal), Pasa Rosada De Malaga, Pierre Ximenes, Uva Pero Ximenez, Uva Pero Ximen, Uva Pero Ximenes, Pero Ximenez, Ximen, Ximenes (in Andalusia), Ximenez, Alamis De Totana, Alamis, Myuskadel, Verdello (in the Canary Islands), Ximenecia, Zalema Colchicina and the abbreviation PX (in Andalucía)	Spain		9,583 (Spain, 2008)	1661
Perle		Germany	Gewurztraminer × Müller-Thurgau		
Petit Courbu	Courbu and Courbu Petit.	France			
Petit Manseng / Izkiriota Ttipi	Escriberou, Ichiriota Zuria Tipia, Mansein, Mansein Blanc, Manseing, Mansenc Blanc, Mansenc Grisroux, Manseng Blanc, Manseng Petit Blanc, Mansengou, Mansic, Mansin, Mausec, Mausenc Blanc, Miot, Petit Mansenc, and Petit Manseng Blanc	France			
Petit Meslier	Arbonne, Barnay, Bernais, Bernet, Co De France, Crene, Feuille D'Ozerolle, Hennequin, Lepine, Maille, Maye, Melie, Melie Blanc, Melier, Meslier De Champagne, Meslier Dore, Meslier Petit A Queue Rouge, Meslier Vert, Mornain Blanc, Orbois, Petit Meslier, Petit Meslier A Queue Rouge, Petit Meslier Dore, Queue Rouge, Saint Lye	France	Gouais blanc × Savagnin	20	
Petite Arvine		Switzerland		154 (2009, Switzerland)	1602
Picardin / Picardan / Aragnan blanc	Aragnan, Aragnan blanc, Araignan, Araignan blanc, Gallet, Gallet blanc, Grosse Clairette, Milhaud blanc, Oeillade blanche, Papadoux, Picardan, Picardan blanc, Piquardan, Piquardant	France			late 17th century.
Picolit / Piccolit / Piccolito	Balafan, Balafant, Blaustengler, Blaustingl Weiss, Kek Nyeliü, Keknyelü, Kel'ner, Peccoleto Bianco, Piccolet, Piccoletta, Piccolit, Piccoliti Bianco, Piccolito, Piccolito Bianco, Piccolito del Friuli, Piccolitt, Piccolitto, Piccolitto Friulano, Picoleto Bianco, Piculit, Pikolit, Pikolit Weiss, Piros Keknyelü, Ranful Weiss, Szabo Istvan, Szod Bajor, Uva del Friuli, Weisser Blaustingl, Weisser Ranful, and Wisellertraube Weiss,	Italy			
Picpoul / Piquepoul blanc / Piquepoul gris	Avello, Avillo, Extra, Feher Piquepoul, Languedocien, Picapoll, Picapolla, Picapulla, Picpoul, Picpoul de Pinet. Avillo, Languedocien, Picapulla, Picpoul, Pikepul Seryi, Piquepoul rose, Szürke Piquepoul.	France		1000 (France, 2000)	
Pigato		Italy			
Pignerol					
Pignoletto					
Pinella	Pinela	Slovenia			
Pinot blanc / Pinot bianco / Klevner / Weissburgunder		Unknown	Pinot noir	1300 (France, 2000), 3491 (Germany, 2006)	
Pinot gris / Pinot grigio / Grauburgunder / Malvoisie / Pinot jaune / Szürkebarát		France	Pinot noir	International variety	13th century
Planta Fina					
Planta Nova					
Plavai / Plavay		Moldova			
Pošip		Croatia			
Prensal	Moll, Pensal Blanca, Premsal, Premsal Blanca, and Prensal Blanc	Spain			
Prié blanc / Blanc de Morgex	Agostenga, Agostana, Agostenga bianca. Agostenga blanc, Agostina, Agostinga, Aostenga, Augustina, Augusttraube, Bernarde (in the Valais region), Bernarde nel Vallese, Bernardine, Bianca Capella, Bianca Capello, Blanc Commun, Blanc de La Salle, Blanc de Morgex, Blanc du Valdigne, Blanc Gros, Blanc Petit, Cibebo bianco, Daniela, Danijela, Early Green Madeira, Frueher Leipziger, Giruelo, Gros blanc, Hedvabne Zlute, Hodvabne Zelene, Hodvabne Zlte, Kienzheimer, Kilianer, Legiruela (in the province of Ávila in Castilla y León), Leipziger Frueh, Lugliatica verde, Luglienca bianca, Lyany Mello, Maddalena Salomon, Madeleine Alice, Madeleine Alice Salomon, Malvasia Belaia, Malvasier Frueh weiss, Malvaziya Belaya, Perltraube, Petit blanc, Plant de la Salle, Precoce de Kientzheim, Prie, Prie bianco, Rabolina weiss, Raisin d'Aout, Rosinentraube, Seidentraube Gruen, Uva Agostina, Uva d'Agosto, Uva Luce, Vert Precoce de Madere, Weisswaelscher and Zibebe weiss.	Italy		39 (Italy, 2000)	1691
Prosecco / Glera	Ghera, Glere, Grappolo Spargolo, Prosecco Tondo, Prosecco, Prosecco Balbi, Prosecco Bianco, Prosecco Nostrano, Prosecco Tondo, Proseko Sciprina, Serpina, and Uva Pissona	Italy			
Prunesta	Bermestia Nera, Bermestia Rossa, Bermestia Violacea, Bermestia Violata, Pergola Rossa, Pergolese Di Tivoli, Pergonesi Di Tivoli, Prunesta Di Ruovo, Prunesta Di Ruvo, Prunesta Nera, Prunesta Rossa, Prunesta Violacea, Prunestra Rosso Violacea, Uva D'inverno, Uva Del Soldato, Uva Roja, Uva Rossa Di Cagliari	Italy			
Rabigato					
Rabo de Ovelha		Portugal			
Raisin blanc					
Rauschling / Rāuschling	Brauner Nürnberger, Brauner Würnberger, Buchelin, Deutsche Trauben, Divicina, Divizhna, Divizhna Vizhna, Dretsch, Drötsch, Drutsch, Dünnelbling, Erjava Tizhna, Frankentraube, Furmentin, Gros Fendant, Großfränkisch, Großer Räuschling, Großer Röuschling, Großer Traminer, Grünspat, Guay Jaune, Heinzler, Klaffer, Klöpfer, Luttenberger, Luttenbergerstock, Luttenbershna, Lyonnaise, Offenburger, Padebecker, Pfäffling, Pfaffentraube, Reuschling, Röschling, Rössling, Ruchelin, Ruschling, Rüschlig, Rüschling, Rüssling, Silberräuschling, Silberweiß, Szrebrobella, Thuner, Thunerrebe, Vigne de Zuri, Weißer Dünnelbling, Weißer Kläpfer, Weißer Lagrein, Weißer Räuschling, Weißwelsch, Weißwelscher, Welsche, Zürirebe, Zürichrebe, Züriweiss and Züriwiss.	Germany	Gouais blanc × Pinot family		
Regner		Germany		420 (Germany 1990)	1929
Reichensteiner		Germany	Müller-Thurgau × Madeleine Angevine × Calabreser Froehlich	106 (Germany 2008),85.38 (England 2010 fig),72 (New Zealand, 2009)	1939
Retagliado bianco	Arba Luxi, Arretallace, Arretallau, Arrosto Portedium, Arrotelas, Bianca Lucente, Bianca Lucida, Co 'e Erbei, Coa de Brebei, Coa de Brebèi, Erba Luxi, Erbaluxi, Mara Bianca, Rechiliau, Redagladu, Redaglàdu, Retagliada, Retagliadu, Retagladu Francese, Retazzadu, Retelau, Retellau, Retigliau, Ritelau, Rittadatu and Rotogliadu.	Italy.		28 (Italy, 2000)	1877
Rèze	Petit Prié Tardif, Reize verte, Réze verte, Rèzi and Resi.	Switzerland			
Ribolla Gialla / Robola	Avola, Erbula, Gargania, Garganja, Glera, Goricka Ribola, Jarbola, Jerbula, Pignolo, Rabiola, Rabola, Rabolla, Rabolla Dzhalla di Rozatsio, Rabuele, Raibola, Rebolla, Reboula jaune, Rébula, Rebula Bela, Rebula rumena, Rebula zuta, Refosco bianco, Ribola, Ribola Bijela, Ribola Djiala, Ribolla, Ribolla Bianca, Ribolla Dzhalla, Ribolla Gialla di Rosazz, Ribolla Gialla di Rosazzo, Ribollat, Ribuela, Ribuele, Ribuele Zale, Ribula Zuta, Ribuole, Robolla, Rosazzo, Rumena Rebula, Teran Bijeli and Zelena Rebula.	Greece			13th century
Riesling / Johannisberg Riesling / Rheinriesling / Klingelberger	Beregi Riesling, Beyaz Riesling, Biela Grasevina, Dinca Grasiva Biela, Edelriesling, Edle Gewuerztraube, Feher Rajnai, Gentil Aromatique, Gentile Aromatique, Gewuerzriesling, Gewuerztraube, Graefenberger, Graschevina, Grasevina Rajnska, Grauer Riesling, Grobriesling, Hochheimer, Johannisberg, Johannisberger, Karbacher Riesling, Kastellberger, Kis Rizling, Kleigelberger, Kleiner Riesling, Kleinriesler, Kleinriesling, Klingelberger, Krauses, Krausses Roessling, Lipka, Moselriesling, Niederlaender, Oberkircher, Oberlaender, Petit Rhin, Petit Riesling, Petracine, Pfaelzer, Pfefferl, Piros Rajnai Rizling, Pussilla, Raisin Du Rhin, Rajinski Rizling, Rajnai Rizling, Rajnski Ruzling, Rano, Reichsriesling, Reissler, Remo, Rendu, Reno, Renski Rizling, Rezlik, Rezlin, Rezlink, Rhein Riesling, Rheingauer, Rheinriesling, Rhiesling, Riesler, Riesling bianco, Riesling blanc, Riesling De Rhin, Riesling Echter Weisser, Riesling Edler, Riesling Gelb Mosel E43, Riesling Giallo, Riesling Grosso, Riesling Gruener Mosel, Riesling Mosel, Riesling Reinskii, Riesling Rhenan, Riesling Rhine, Rieslinger, Rislinenok, Rislinok, Rizling Linner, Rizling Rajinski, Rizling Rajnai, Rizling Rajnski, Rizling Reinskii, Rizling Rynsky, Roessling, Rohac, Rossling, Rosslinger, Ruessel, Ruessling, Russel, Ryn-Riesling, Ryzlink Rynsky, Starosvetske, Starovetski, Szürke Rizling, Uva Pussila, Weisser Riesling	Germany	Gouais blanc × ?	International Variety	15th century
Rieslaner		Germany	Silvaner × Riesling		1921
Rkatsiteli		Georgia			Ancient
Robola	Asporombola, Asprorobola, Asprorompola, Robbola, Robola Aspri, Robola Kerini, Rombola, Rombola Aspri and Rompola.	Greece			13th century
Roditis / Rhoditis		Greece			
Rollo					
Romorantin	Blanc De Villefranche, Celle Bruere, Dameri, Daneri, Danesy, Dannery, Framboise, Gros Blanc De Villefranche, Gros Plant De Villefranche, Lyonnaise Blanche, Maclon, Petit Dannezy, Petit Maconnais, Plant De Breze, Raisin De Grave, Ramorantin, Romoranten, Romorantin Blanc, Saint Amand, Verneuil.	France	Gouais blanc × Pinot		early 16th century
Rossese bianco	None	Italy			15th century
Roter Veltliner	Ariavina, Ariavina Männliche, Bakor, Belo Ocka, Belo Oka, Buzyn, Cerveny Muskatel, Crvena Valtelina, Crvena Valtelinka, Csucsos Bakor, Debela Ariavina, Dreimänner, Erdezha, Erdezha Shopatna, Erdezka Rabolina, Fedleiner, Feldleiner, Feldleiner Rothlichter, Feldliner, Feldlinger, Feltliner, Fleisch Roter Velteliner, Fleisch Roter Wälteliner, Fleisch Traminer, Fleischroter Traminer, Fleischrother Velteliner, Fleischrother Veltliner, Fleischtraminer, Fleischtraube, Fleischtraube Rot, Fleischweiner, Grosbrauner Velteliner, Grossbrauner, Grosse Fleischtraube, Grosser Fleischtraube, Grosser Roter Veltliner, Grosser Rother Välteliner, Grosser Rother Veltliner, Grosser Traminer, Grosser Välteliner, Grosser Velteliner, Grosswiener, Herera Rhaetica, Herera Valtellina, Kecskecsecs, Krdeca, Männliche Ariavina, Mannliche, Maucnjk, Mavcnik, Mavenick, Mavenik, Moseavina, Moslavina, Muscateller, Muskatel Cerveny, Nagy Veltelini, Nagysagos, Nyulsölö, Nyulszölö, Piros Veltelini, Pirosveltelin, Pirosveltelini, Rabolina, Raifler, Raisin de Saint Valentin, Ranfler, Ranfolica, Ranfolina, Ranfoliza, Raufler, Raufolica, Rebalina, Rebolina, Red Veltliner, Reifler, Rhaetica, Riegersburger Rothköpfel, Riegersburger Rothtöpfel, Rivola Tchervena, Rossera, Rossola, Rote Fleisch Traube, Rote Fleischtraube, Rote Fleischtrauble, Roter, Roter Muskateller, Roter Riesling, Roter Välteliner, Roter Velteliner, Roter Veltiner, Roter Veltliner, Rotgipfler, Rothe Shopatna, Rothe Shopotna, Rothe Velteliner, Rother Fleischtraube, Rother Muscateller, Rother Raifler, Rother Riesling, Rother Välteliner, Rother Velteliner, Rother Veltliner, Rother Zierfahnler, Rothgipfler, Rothlichter, Rothreifler, Rotmehlweisser, Rotmuskateller, Rotreifler, Rudeca, Ryvola Cervena, Ryvola Crvena, Saint Valentin Rose, Saint Valentinrose, Shopatna, Shopotna, Somsölö, Spaete Ranfoliza, St. Valentin, Tarant Cerveny, Tarant Rot, Todtraeger Rotreifler, Traminer, Uva di San Valentino, Valentin, Valentin Rouge, Välteliner, Välteliner Roter, Valtelin Rouge, Valteliner, Vältliner, Valteliner Rosso, Valteliner Rouge, Valteliner Tardif, Veltelin Piros, Veltelin Rosso, Velteline Rouge, Velteliner, Velteliner Rose, Velteliner Roso, Velteliner Roter, Velteliner Rother, Velteliner Rouge, Veltelini Piros, Veltlinac Crveni, Veltliner, Veltliner Rosso, Veltliner Rot Weiss, Veltliner Roth, Veltliner Rother, Veltliner Rouge, Veltlini Piros, Veltlinske Cervene, Veltlinski Rozovii, Veltlinskii Rozovii, Veltlinsky Rosovy, Vernyeges Veltelini, Verrnyeges Veltelini, Weisser Raifler, Weissholzige Ribula Maucnjk, and Ziegelroth.	Austria			
Rotgipfler		Austria	Traminer × Roter Veltliner	118.42 (Austria, 1999)	1837
Roupeiro / Codega		Portugal			
Roussanne	Barbin, Bergeron (in particular in the Savoy region), Courtoisie, Fromental, Fromental jaune, Fromenteal, Fromenteau, Greffon, Greffou, Martin Cot, Petite Rousette, Picotin blanc, Plant de Seyssel, Rabellot, Rabelot, Ramoulette, Rebellot, Rebolot, Remoulette, Roussane, Roussane blanc, Roussanne blanc, Roussette, Rusan Belyi, Rusan Blan.	France			
Rovello bianco	Roviello, Rovello, Greco Muscio and Grecomusc.				1875
Sabro					
Sacy / Tresallier	Aligoté vert, Blanc de Pays, Blanc Moulin, Blanc vert, Fairené, Farié, Farinier blanc, Ferné, Fernet, Ferney, Gros blanc, Menu blanc, Peut blanc, Pivoine, Plant d'Essert, Plant de Sacy, Sassy, Souche, Terzari, Tres Sailier, Tresalier, Tresallier, Tressaillier, Tressalier, Tressallier, Trezaguier, Trezailhi, Trezali, Trezari, and Weissklemmer.	France(?)	Pinot × Gouais blanc		
Ste Marie					
Saint-Pierre Doré	Cerceau, Epinette, Epinette blanc, Epinette blanche, Firminhac, Lucane, Per Dore, Roussellou, Saint-Clair, Saint Come, Saint Pierre, San Per Dore and Saint-Pierre de l'Allier	France			
Sarfeher / Sárfehér		Hungary			
Sauvignon Blanc / Sauvignon Gris	Beyaz Sauvignon, Blanc Doux, Blanc Fume, Bordeaux bianco, Douce blanche, Feher Sauvignon, Feigentraube, Fie, Fie dans le Neuvillois, Fume, Fume Blanc, Fume Surin, Genetin, Gennetin, Gentin a Romorantin, Gros Sauvignon, Libournais, Melkii Sotern, Muskat Silvaner, Muskat Sylvaner, Muskatani Silvanec, Muskatni Silvanec, Muskatsilvaner, Painechon, Pellegrina, Petit Sauvignon, Picabon, Piccabon, Pinot Mestny Bely, Pissotta, Puinechou, Punechon, Punechou, Quinechon, Rouchelin, Sampelgrina, Sarvonien, Sauternes, Sauvignon, Sauvignon bianco, Sauvignon Bijeli, Sauvignon blanco, Sauvignon Fume, Sauvignon Gros, Sauvignon jaune, Sauvignon jeune, Sauvignon Petit, Sauvignon vert, Sauvignon White, Savagnin, Savagnin blanc, Savagnin Musque, Savagnou, Savignon, Servanien, Servonien, Servoyen, Souternes, Sovinak, Sovinjon, Sovinjon Beli, Sovinon, Spergolina, Surin, Sylvaner Musque, Uva Pelegrina, Weisser Sauvignon, and Zöld Ortlibi.	France	Savagnin × ?	International Variety	
Sauvignon Vert / Sauvignonasse / Friulano / Tocai Friulano	Sauvignonasse, Friulano, Tokaj, Jakot	Italy			
Savagnin / Savagnin Blanc / Traminer	Auvernat blanc, Bon blanc, Forment, Formentin blanc, Fraentsch, Fromenteau, Gentil blanc, Gruenedel, Princ Bily, Printsch Grau, Ryvola Bila, Schleitheimer, Servoyen blanc, Traminer D'Ore, Traminer Weiss.	France			ca 1000
Savatiano		Greece			
Scheurebe	Alzey S. 88, Dr. Wagnerrebe, S 88, Sämling, Sämling 88, Scheu, Scheu 88 and Scheu Riesling	Germany	Riesling × ?		1916
Schönburger		Germany	Pinot noir × (Chasselas × Muscat Hamburg)		1979
Sémillon		France		International Variety	18th - 19th century
Septiner					
Sercial / Cerceal / Esgana Cão / Esgana		Portugal			
Sereksia / Băbească albă	Aldarusa, Asil Kara, Asîl Kara (in the Republic of Dagestan), Băbească, Babeasca, Babiasca niagra, Babiaska niagra, Bobiaska niagra, Bobyaksa nigra, Bobyaska nyagra, Căldărușă, Caldarusa, Chernyi Redkii (in Ukraine), Chernyl Redkyl, Ciornai Redchii, Crăcană, Cracana, Crăcănată, Cracanata, Crecanate, Goldaroucha, Grossmuttertraube, Hexentraube, Kaouchanskii, Koldaroucha, Koldarusha, Koldursha, Koptchak, Koptchakk, Krekanat, Krekanate, Racanata, Rară Neagră, Răşchirată, Raschirata, Rastopirka, Rastopyrka, Rastrepa, Rastreppa, Rastriopa (in Moldova), Redkyi Chernyi, Rekhavo Grazdi, Rekhavo Grozdi, Rekhavo Grozdy, Richkirate, Richkiriata, Riedkym, Rimtsurate, Rimtzourate, Rindsourata, Rishki Rate, Rossmuffertraube, Rostopiska, Rostopoveska, Rychkirate, Rymourate, Rympurate, Ryshkirate, Saesser, Sassep, Sasser, Serecsia, Serecsia Ciornaia (in Moldova), Serectia, Sereksia (in Ukraine), Sereksia Chornaya, Sereksiya (in the United States), Sereksiya Chernaya, Sereksiya Tschiornaya, Serexia, Serexia noir, Serexia Tcheurnaia, Sesser, Stropaty, Stropatyi, Tchernyi Redkii, Tcheurny Redky, Timofeevka, Tsotler, and Tsotlyar.	Moldavia / Romania	4516 (2008)		
Sideritis					
Siegerrebe	Alzey 7957, AZ 7957, Scheu 7957 and Sieger.	Germany	Madeleine Angevine × Gewürztraminer	110 (2006, Germany)	1929
Silvaner / Sylvaner / Österreicher	Arvine, Arvine Grande, Augustiner Weiss, Beregi Szilvani, Boetzinger, Clozier, Cynifadl Zeleny, Cynifal, Fliegentraube, Frankenriesling, Frankentraube, Fueszeres Szilvani, Gamay blanc, GentilvVert, Gros Rhin, Gros-rhin, Gruen Silvaner, Gruenedel, Gruenfraenkisch, Grün Silvaner, Haeusler Schwarz, Johannisberger, Mishka, Momavaka, Monterey Riesling, Moravka, Movavka, Muschka, Mushza, Musza, Nemetskii Rizling, Oesterreicher, Oestreicher, Pepltraube, Picardon blanc, Picardou blanc, Plant Du Rhin, Rhin, Rundblatt, Salfin, Salfine Bely, Salvaner, Salviner, Scharvaner, Scherwaner, Schoenfeilner, Schwaebler, Schwuebler, Sedmogradka, Sedmogradska Zelena, Selenzhiz, Selivan, Silvanske Zelene, Sonoma Riesling, Sylvan Zeleny, Sylvaner, Sylvaner verde, Szilvani Feher, Tschafahnler, Yesil Silvaner, Zelencic, Zeleny, Zierfandler, Zierifandel, Zinifal, Zoeld Szilvani, Zoeldsilvaniб Syilvaner, Siylvaner, Sylvaner vert, Grüner Sylvaner, Grünfraenkisch, Franken Riesling and Grüner Silvaner.	Central Europe			
Mátrai Muskotály		Hungary	Arany sárfehér × Muscat Ottonel		1929
Smederevka		Serbia			Ancient
Souvignier gris	FR 392-83 and Freiburg 392-83	Germany	Cabernet Sauvignon × Bromer		1983
Spagnol					
Sultana		Ottoman Empire			
Sumoll Blanc	Sumoi Blanc and Sumoll Blanco.	Spain			
Symphony		US	Muscat of Alexandria × Grenache gris		1948
Tamarêz / Tamares / Crato branco					
Tamîioasa / Tămâioasă Românească / Tamianka					
Taminga		Australia	Merbein 29-56 × Traminer Rot		1960s
Tempranillo blanco	Albana, Cencibel de la Mancha, Forenses, Temprana, Tempranilla, Tempranillo de la Rioja, Tinto de la Rioja and Tinto Fino.	Spain	Tempranillo		1988
Téoulier	Brun, Grand Téoulier, Gros Teoulier, Manosquen, Manosquin, Petit Téoulier, Petit Thuilier, Petit Thulier, Plant de Manosque, Plant de Porto, Plant Dufour, Taurier, Teinturier Téoulier, Thuillier, Teoulie, Teoulier, Thuilier, Thuillier Noir and Trouillère.	France			
Terrantez	Morrao, Murrao, Pe de Perdiz, Pe de Perdrix, Pied de Perdix and Terrantes.	Portugal			
Terret Gris	Bourret, Tarret, Terrain, Terret bourret and Terret rose.	France		5000 (France, 1980s), 2000 (France, 2000)	
Thrapsathiri		Greece			
Timorasso	Morasso, Timuassa, Timoraccio, Timorazza and Timorosso.	Italy			See Page
Torrontés / Torontel / Moscatel de Austria	See Wiki Page	Argentina			
Tourbat / Torbato	Canina, Caninu, Cuscosedda Bianca, Malvoisie des Pyrenees Orientales, Malvoisie du Roussillon, Malvoisie Tourbat, Razola, Torbat, Torbato, Torbato Bianco, Trubat Iberica, Trubau, Turbato, and Turbau	France			
Trbljan					
Trebbiano / Ugni Blanc	lbano, Albana secco, Biancone, Blanc Auba, Blanc De Cadillac, Blancoun, Bobiano, Bonebeou, Branquinha, Brocanico, Bubbiano, Buriano, Buzzetto, Cadillac, Cadillate, Castelli, Castelli Romani, Castillone, Chator, Clairette D'Afrique, Clairette De Vence, Clairette Ronde, Engana Rapazes, Espadeiro branco, Falanchina, Greco, Gredelin, Hermitage White, Juni Blan, Lugana, Malvasia Fina, Muscadet Aigre, Padeiro branco, Perugino, Procanico, Procanico Dell Isola D Elba, Procanico Portoferraio, Queue De Renard, Romani, Rossan De Nice, Rossetto, Rossola, Rossula, Roussan, Rusciola, Saint Emilion, Saint Emilion Des Charentes, Santoro, Shiraz White, Spoletino, Talia, Trebbianello, Trebbiano, Trebbiano Della Fiamma, Trebbiano Di Cesene, Trebbiano Di Empoli, Trebbiano Di Lucca, Trebbiano Di Tortona, Trebbiano Fiorentino, Trebbiano Toscano, Trebbianone, Tribbiano, Tribbiano Forte, Turbiano, Ugni blanc, Bouan, Beau, Thalia, Trebbiano di Soave, Trebbiano Romagnolo, Trebbiano Gallo and Trebbiano d'Abruzzo.	Italy			Roman Empire
Treixadura / Trajadura	Treixadura blanca, Teixadura blanca, Tragadura, Trinca dente, Trincadente, Trincadeira and Verdello Rubio.	Portugal		58000 (Portugal), 12000 (Elsewhere)	
Trousseau Gris / Grey Riesling	Baratszölö, Chauche Gris, Francia Szürke, Goundoulenc, Gray Riesling, Grey Riesling, Gris de Salces, Gris de Salses, Guindolenc, Guindoulenc, Hamu Szölö, Hamuszölö, Nagyvati, Sals, Sals Cenusiu, Salses Gris, Shome Seryi, Sose Serii, Terret D'Afrique	France	Trousseau		
Tsaoussi					
Tsolikauri		Georgia			
Vega	Dalmasso 2-26, I.D. 2/26 and Incrocio Dalmassso II/26.	Italy	Furmint × Malvazija Istarska	28 (Italy, 2000)	1937
Verdea	Colombana, Colombana bianca (in Tuscany), Colombana del Picciolli, Colombana di Peccioli (in Tuscany), Colombano, Doree d'Italia, Doree d'Italie, Gambo rosso, Paradisa, Paradisa di Bologne, Paradssiotto, Paradizia, S. Colombano, San Colombano, San Colombano Paradiso d'Italia, Sancolombana, Vardea, Verdea di Montalto, Verdecana and Verdicchio Giallo.	Italy		158 (Italy, 2000)	1303
Verdeca	Albese bianco, Albina verde, Alvino verde, Biancolina, Carosella, Primarulo, San Gennaro, Tivolese, Uva marana, Verdacchio, Verde, Verdea, Verdera, Verdesca, Verdicchio bianco, Verdicchio femmina, Verdicchio Verde, Verdicchio Peloso, Verdichio Tirolese, Verdichio Tivolese, Verdicella, Verdigno, Verdisco, Verdisco bianco, Verdisio bianco, Verdolino, Verdone and Vino verde	Italy		Multiple Regions	
Verdejo		North Africa, Spain	Savagnin × Castellana Blanca		
Verdelho / Gouveio / Verdello		Portugal			15th century
Verdello	Verdetto	Italy		678 (Italy, 2000)	1894
Verdesse	Bian ver, Bian vert, Blanchette, Clairette de Chindrieux, Clairette précoce, Dongine, Etraire Blanche, Verdasse, Verdea, Verdêche, Verdesse Muscade, Verdeze musqué and Verdeze musquée.	France			
Verdicchio	Boschera bianca, Giallo, Maceratese, Maggiore, Marchigiano, Mazzanico, Niuivres, Peloso, Peverella, Peverello, Peverenda, Peverise bianco, Pfeffer, Pfeffertraube, Terbiana, Torbiana, Trebbiano di Lugana, Trebbiano di Soave, Trebbiano verde, Trebbiano Veronese, Turbiana, Turbiana Moscato, Turbiano, Turviana, Uva Aminea, Uva Marana, Verdello duro persico, Verdicchio bianco, Verdicchio Dolce, Verdicchio Doratel, Verdicchio Doratello, Verdicchio Giallo, Verdicchio Marchigiano, Verdicchio Marino, Verdicchio Peloso, Verdicchio Scroccarello, Verdicchio Seroccarello, Verdicchio Straccione, Verdicchio Stretto, Verdicchio Verdaro, Verdicchio verde, Verdicchio Verzaro, Verdicchio Verzello, Verdone, Verzaro and Verzello verde.	Italy		65000 (Italy, 1980s)	14th century
Verdiso / Verdia	Groppeta, Pedevendia, Perduti Perevenda, Peverenda, Verdia, Verdia de Campagna, Verdia Bianca di Conegliano, Verdiga, Verdiger, Verdisa, Verdisa bianca Trevignana, Verdisa Grossa, Verdisco, Verdise, Verdise Bianca, Verdisio, Verdiso Gentile, Verdiso Zentil, Verdisone, Verdiza and Verdisot.	Italy			
Verdoncho					
Verduzzo	Ramandolo, Romandolo, Verdana Friulana, Verdicchio Friulano, Verduc, Verduz, Verduza, Verduzzo Friulano, Verduzzo giallo, Veduzz, Verduzo and Verduzzo verde	Italy		1658 (Italy, 2000)	1409
Verduzzo Trevigiano	Ramandolo, Romandolo, Verdana Friulana, Verdicchio Friulano, Verduc, Verduz, Verduza, Verduzzo Friulano, Verduzzo giallo, Veduzz, Verduzo and Verduzzo verde	Italy		1734 (Italy, 2000)	
Vermentino / Rolle	Agostenga, Agostenga blanc, Brustiano, Brustiano di Corsica, Carbes, Carbesso, Favorita, Favorita bianca, Favorita Bianca di Conegliano, Favorita d'Alba, Favorita di Alba, Favorita di Conegliano, Formentino, Fourmentin, Garbesso, Grosse Clarette, Malvasia a Bonifacio, Malvasia Grossa, Malvasie, Malvoisie, Malvoisie è Gros Grains, Malvoisie Corse, Malvoisie de Corse, Malvoisie Précoce d'Espagne, Piccabon, Piga, Pigato, Rolle, Rossese, Sibirkovski, Uva Sapaiola, Uva Vermentino, Valentin, Varlentin, Varresana bianca, Vennentino, Verlantin, Vermentini, Vermentino bianco, Vermentino Pigato, and Vermentinu.	Italy			
Vernaccia		Europe			
Vernaccia di Oristano	Aregu biancu, Aregu Seulu, Cagnaccia, Carnaggia, Cranaccia, Garnaccia, Granazza, Moranina, Varnaccia, Vernaccia, Vernaccia Austera, Vernaccia bianca, Vernaccia Orosei, Vernaccia S. Rosalia, Vernaccia San Rosalia, Vernaccia di S. Vero Milis, Vernaccia di San Vero Milis and Vernaccia di Solarussa.	Italy		582 (Italy, 2000)	800 BC
Veroga					
Versoaln	Versailler, Versoaler, Weiss Versoalen and Weisser Versailler	Disputed			
Vespaiola	Bresparola, Bresparola Bianca, Orisi bianca, Uva Vespera, Vespaia, Vespaiolo, Vespajola, Vespajuola Di Bassano, Vesparola, and Vespera.	Italy			
Vidiano	Avidiano and Abudiano.	Greece			
Vilana	Belana and Velana.	Greece			
Vinhao					
Viognier	Bergeron, Barbin, Rebolot, Greffou, Picotin Blanc, Vionnier, Petiti Vionnier, Viogne, Galopine, Vugava bijela	Croatia, France		International variety	
Viosinho		Portugal			
Vital (grape)	Boal Bonifacio, Malvazia Corada, Malvasia Fina de Douro, Malvasia Fina do Douro and Malvasia ou Malvazia	Portugal			
Vitovska		Slovenia	Prosecco Tondo × Malvasia Bianca Lunga		
Voskehat					
Vugava		Croatia			1st century
Weldra		South Africa	Trebbiano × Chenin blanc		
Welschriesling / Riesling Italico / Olaszrizling / Lazki Rizling / Graševina	Aminea Gemela, Biela Sladka, Bielasladka Grasica, Glasica, Grasavina Talijanska, Grasevina, Graševina, Grasica, Groshevina, Italianski Rizling, Laški Rizling, Nemes Olasz Rizling, Olaszrizling, Olasz Rizling, Petit Riesling, Petracine, Rakusky Rizling, Riesler, Riesli, Riesling, Riesling Italian, Riesling Italico, Risling Italyanskii, Risling Vlashskii, Rismi, Rizling Italico, Rizling Vlašský, Talianska Graseviana, Talijanski Rizling, Vlasak, Italian Riesling, Ryzlink vlašský	Central Europe			
Würzer		Germany	Gewürztraminer × Müller-Thurgau	100 (Germany)	1932
Xarel·lo / Xarello	Cartoixa, Cartuja, Cartuxa, Moll, Pansa, Pansa Blanca, Pansal, Pansalat, Pansalet, Pansar, Pensal, Prensa Branco, Vinate, Vinyater, Xarell-Lo, Xarello and Xarelo Blanco	Spain		8750 (Spain, 2004)	
Xynisteri		Cyprus		500	
Zala Gyöngye		Hungary			
Zalema	Ignobilis, Rebazo, Salemo, Salerno, Zalemo, and Zalemo Rebazo.	Spain			
Zefir		Hungary	Hárslevelű × Leányka / Fetiaska		1983
Zenit		Hungary	Ezerjó × Bouvier		1976
Zengő	Zen	Hungary	Ezerjó × Bouvier		1982
Zéta / Orémus		Hungary	Furmint × Bouvier		1951
Zeusz	Zeus	Hungary	Ezerjó × Bouvier		1994
Zierfandler / Spätrot	Cilifai, Cilifan, Cirfandli, Cirifai, Cirifai Piros, Cirifan, Gumpoldskirchener, Gumpoldskirchener Spätrot, Gumpoldskirchener Spätroth, Kesoei Piros, Kirmizi Zierfahndler, Nemes Cirfandli, Piros Cirfandli, Piroscirfandli, Raifler, Reifler Rot, Roter Raifler, Roter Reifler, Roter Zierfandler, Roth Hensch, Rother Raifler, Rother Zierfahndler, Rothhinschen, Rothreifler, Rotreifler, Rubiner, Spätrot, Zerjavina and Zierfandler Rot	Austria	Roter Veltliner × Traminer	98.25 (Austria, 2004)	
Žilavka	Mostarska, Mostarska Žilavka, Zhelavka Biella, Žilava Hercegovačka, Zilavka, Žilavka Bijela, and Žilavka Mostarska.	Bosnia and Herzegovina			
Žlahtina					

==== Rose grapes ====
Common name(s)	All synonyms	Country of origin	Pedigree	Hectares cultivated (year)	Year of introduction
Agdam Gyzyl Uzumu	Agdam gyzyl izyum, Agdam gyzyl uzumu, Agdam qizil uezuemue, Agdam's gyzyl uzumu	Azerbaijan			
Chablais Rose	Black Chablais, Black Chablis, Chablais Blanc, Chablais Rose	Switzerland			
Chardonnay Rose	Chablis Blanc, Chablis Rose, Pink Chablis, Red Chablais, Rielsing Rose	France			
Gray Riesling Rose	Barbera Rose, Gray Barbera Rose, Gray Chablais,	France			
Red Rose	Black Rose, Pink Chablais, Red Chablis, Red Rielsing Rose	Switzerland			
Zinfandel Rose	Zinfandel Chablis, Red Zinfandel Chablais,	Austria			

=== Vitis vinifera (table) ===
==== Red table grapes ====
- Black Corinth
- Black Monukka
- Black Rose
- Cardinal
- Mazzarrone
- Red Corinth
- Red Globe
- Valencia
- Red Flame
- Richard Walden

==== White table grapes ====
- Agh Shani
- Calmeria
- Centennial
- Cotton Candy grapes
- Koshu
- Malingre Précoce
- Mazzarrone
- Moonballs
- Perlette
- Rozaki
- Shine Muscat
- Sugraone / Superior Seedless / Menindee Seedless
- Sultana / Thompson Seedless
- Valvin Muscat
- White Corinth

=== Vitis labrusca (wine and table) ===
Many commercial varieties commonly called labrusca are actually complex interspecies hybrids.

==== Wine grapes ====
- Campbell Early
- Catawba
- Concord
- Delaware
- Diamond
- Fredonia
- Isabella
- Ives
- Niagara
- Noah

==== Red table grapes ====
- Canadice
- Christmas Rose
- Crimson Seedless
- Einset
- Emperor
- Flame Seedless
- Reliance Seedless
- Rouge
- Ruby Roman
- Ruby Seedless
- Swenson Red
- Tudor Premium Red
- Suffolk Red
- Vanessa
- Yates

==== Purple/pink table grapes ====
- Alden
- Autumn Royal
- Beauty Seedless
- Bluebell
- Buffalo
- Concord
- Coronation
- Fantasy Seedless
- Glenora
- Jupiter
- Marroo
- Mars
- Niabell
- Ribier
- Steuben
- Van Buren

==== Varied/other ====
- Cassady (green)
- Golden Muscat (green)
- Himrod (white)
- Interlaken (white)
- Lakemont (white)
- Marquis (white)
- Neptune (white)
- Seneca (green)

=== Vitis riparia (wine grape rootstock and hybridization source) ===
- Riparia Gloire
- Riparia Grand Glabre
- Riparia Scribner
- Riparia Martin
- Riparia 89
- Americas

=== Vitis rotundifolia (table and wine) ===
- Big Red (grape)
- Black Beauty (grape)
- Black Fry
- Carlos (grape)
- Cowart
- Darlene (grape)
- Dixie Red
- Early Fry
- Fry (grape)
- Granny Val
- Higgins (grape)
- Hunt
- Hunter (grape)
- Ison's
- Janebell (grape)
- Janet (grape)
- Jumbo (grape)
- Late Fry
- Magnolia (grape)
- Muscadine
- Nesbit (grape)
- Noble
- Pam (grape)
- Pineapple (grape)
- Scarlet (grape)
- Scuppernong
- Southland
- Sugargate
- Supreme (grape)
- Summit (grape)
- Sweet Jenny
- Tara (grape)
- Triumph (grape)

=== Vitis rupestris ===
- Rupestris St. George

=== Vitis aestivalis (wine) ===
- Black Spanish

=== Vitis mustangensis (table/wine/dyes) ===
- Mustang Grape

== Multispecies hybrid grapes ==
=== Vinifera hybrids (wine) ===
Hybrid grape varieties (see Hybrid grapes) or "hybrids" is, in fact, the popular term for a subset of what are properly known as hybrids, specifically crossings between one species of the genus Vitis and another. The scientific definition of a hybrid grape is any crossing (intra- or inter-specific) of two grape varieties. In keeping with the popular definition, however, the ones listed below are inter-specific hybrids where one parent is a European grape. Most of these are complex mixtures of three or more species and all parents are not always clearly known.

- Alexander
- Agawam
- Aurore
- Baco 22A (Baco blanc)
- Baco noir (Baco 1)
- Blanc du Bois
- Brianna
- Cabernet blanc
- Cabernet Cortis
- Cayuga White
- Chambourcin
- Chancellor
- Chardonel
- Chelois
- Corot noir
- Couderc noir
- Crimson Cabernet
- De Chaunac
- Edelweiss
- Elvira
- Esprit
- Flora (grape)
- Flot rouge
- Frontenac
- Goethe
- Herbert
- Kay Gray
- L'Acadie blanc
- L'Ambertille
- La Crescent
- La Crosse
- Léon Millot
- Louise Swenson
- Luci Kuhlmann
- Marechal Foch
- Marechal Joffre
- Marquette
- Massasoit
- Melody
- Merzling
- Noiret
- Norton / Cynthiana
- Onaka
- Orion
- Phoenix
- Plantet
- Prairie Star
- Ravat blanc / Ravat 6
- Ravat noir / Ravat 262
- Rayon d'Or
- Regent
- Rembrandt
- Requa
- Rondo
- Rosette
- Rougeon
- Royalty
- Rubired
- St. Croix
- St. Pepin
- Severny
- Solaris
- Sovereign Opal
- Traminette
- Triomphe d'Alsace
- Valvin muscat
- Vidal blanc
- Vignoles / Ravat 51
- Villard blanc
- Villard noir
- Zarya Severa

=== Vinifera hybrids (table) ===
- Boskoop Glory, Vitis vinifera × Vitis labrusca
- Honey Red
- Kyoho, Vitis vinifera × Vitis labrusca
- Pione, complex hybrid
- Rombough Seedless, Vitis labrusca × Vitis × Esprit
- Thomcord, Vitis vinifera × Vitis labrusca

=== Non-vinifera hybrids (table and wine) ===
- Beta, Vitis labrusca × Vitis riparia
- Cascade, complex hybrid
- Clinton, Vitis labrusca × Vitis riparia
- Bordo/Ives noir, probably Vitis labrusca × Vitis aestivalis
- Jaeger 70, Vitis aestivalis and Vitis rupestris
- L'Acadie blanc, complex hybrid
- Landal noir, complex hybrid
- Landot noir, complex hybrid
- Minnesota 78, Vitis labrusca × Vitis riparia × possibly Vitis vinifera
- Muscat bleu, complex hybrid
- Seyval blanc, complex hybrid
- Seyval noir, complex hybrid

=== Non-vinifera hybrids (rootstock) ===
- SO4, Vitis berlandieri Planch. × V. riparia Michx.
- 5BB, Vitis berlandieri Planch. × V. riparia Michx.
- 5C, Vitis berlandieri Planch. × V. riparia Michx.
- 110R, V. berlandieri × V. rupestris
- 1616 Couderc, Vitis solonis × V. riparia
- Harmony, ((V. riparia × V. labrusca) × V. vinifera) × Vitis champinii
- 8909-05, Vitis rupestris 'A. de Serres' × Vitis rotundifolia 'Cowart'
- 3309 C, V. riparia × V. rupestris

== See also ==
- Annual growth cycle of grapevines
- Hybrid grape
- International variety
- Lists of cultivars
- Vitis 'Ornamental Grape', a nonflowering and nonfruiting variety
