= Badagoni =

Wine company

- Type: Winery
- Industry: wine industry
- Founded: 2002
- Headquarters: Georgia
- Number of employees: 1,500 (2026)
- Website: badagoni.com

Badagoni Wine Company (Georgian: ბადაგონი), previously known as Knight of Winemaking, is a Georgian wine producer. The company was founded in then Kakhetian village of Zemo Khodasheni (Akhmeta district) in 2002. Currently, it owns more than 400 hectares (990 acres) of vineyards of selected local grape varieties of then districts of Khvareli, Mukuzani, Akhasheni, Akura and Ojaleshi. Its products include such brands as Tsinandali, Mukuzani, Kindzmarauli, Gurjaani, Saperavi, Akhasheni and more. In addition, then company makes Kakhetian Noble — a special wine made in cooperation with Donato Lanati, an Italian enologist.

== See also ==
- Georgian wine
- List of Georgian wine appellations
