= Barakoni wine =

Semi-dry Georgian alcoholic beverage

Barakoni (Georgian: ბარაკონი) red wine is originated on the steep slopes of the Rioni gorge in the mountainous western region of Racha (modern-day Racha-Lechkhumi and Kvemo Svaneti) in Georgia.

This wine, made from Aleksandrouli and Mudzhuretuli grapes (the same grapes from which Khvanchkara is made), is naturally semi-dry. Barakoni contains 10-12% alcohol, 1.5-2.5% sugar and has 5-7% titrated acidity.

Produced since 1981, Barakoni wine is named after the Georgian Orthodox Barakoni Church of the Mother of God (Georgian: ბარაკონის ღვთისმშობლის ტაძარი), commonly known as Barakoni (ბარაკონი). It is an important surviving example of the medieval tradition of Georgian architecture.

== See also ==
- Georgian wine
- Sweetness of wine
- List of Georgian wine appellations
