= Avasirkhva =

Grape variety

- Grape (Vitis)
- Color of berry skin: White
- Also called: Aosirkhhvaji, Ajishi; Cherniavkhi; Shareri
- Origin: Georgia, Abkhazia
- Notable regions: Black Sea coast

Avasirkhva (Georgian: ავასირხვა), also known as Aosirkhhvaji, Ajishi , Cherniavkhi and Shareri ) is a white Abkhazian (Georgian) vine grape.

== See also ==
- Georgian wine
- List of Georgian wine appellations

== Bibliography ==
- Ketskhoveli; Ramishvili; Tabidze, N.; M. D. (2012). Georgian Ampelography (Second ed.). Tbilisi: Vitis. p. 104. ISBN 9783930037889.
