= Tsinandali wine =

White wine from Georgia

Tsinandali (Georgian: წინანდალი, romanized: ts'inandali) white wine comes from Georgia. It is made from Rkatsiteli and Mtsvane grapes and comes from the Telavi and Kvareli area of Kakheti. Tsinandali is fermented at cool temperatures and matured for two to three years to bring out the complexity. Tsinandali can be aged for a further five, adopting some nutty bottle-aged characters in the process. It has a pale golden color and a light body. The flavor is light, with a moderate finish.

== History ==
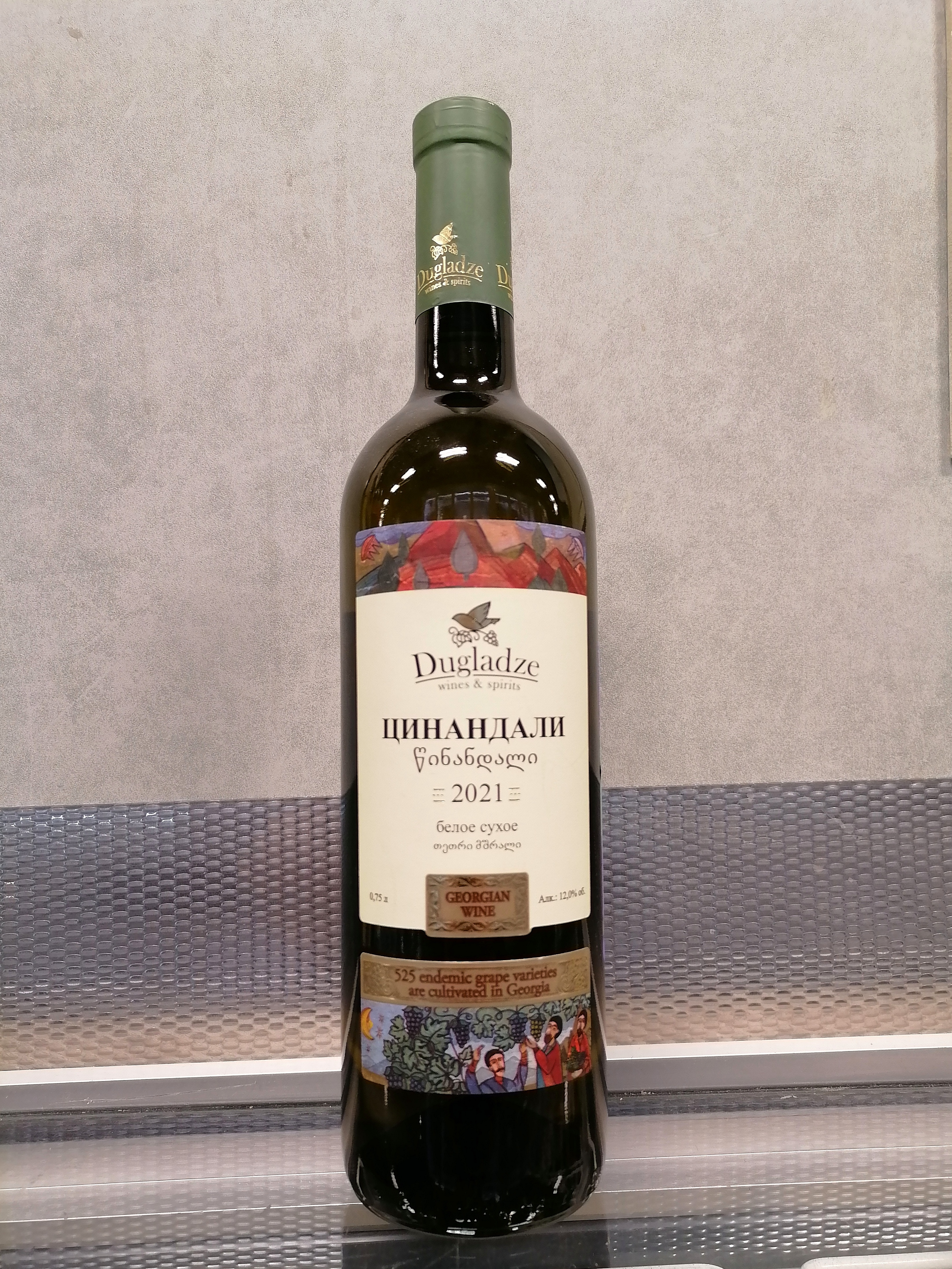
Tsinandali

Wine production in Georgia is very long-standing with a history going back at least 8000 years. Its production is also associated with the arrival of Christianity, brought by St. Nino in the fourth century AD. Georgia produces over 50 wine types and is the home of over 500 grape varieties. Production was small scale at first but became increasingly large-scale and standardized until the Soviet era, which placed emphasis on quantity rather than quality and differentiated the industry into three parts, growers, fermenters and bottlers. Since the breakup of the Soviet Union, the industry has been vertically integrated into smaller scale but full-cycle production.

It may be served with appetizers, as well as with light meat and fish dishes. It is recommended to serve chilled to 10–12°C.

== See also ==
- Georgian wine
- Sweetness of wine
- List of Georgian wine appellations
