= Amlakhu =

- Grape (Vitis)
- Color of berry skin: Red
- Origin: Georgia, Abkhazia
- Notable regions: Black Sea coast

Amlakhu (Georgian: ამლახუ), also known as Amlaxuji) is a red Abkhazian (Georgian (country)) vine grape.

== See also ==
- Georgian wine
- List of Georgian wine appellations

== Bibliography ==
- Ketskhoveli; Ramishvili; Tabidze, N.; M. D. (2012). Georgian Ampelography (Second ed.). Tbilisi: Vitis. pp. 99–103. ISBN 9783930037889.
