= Alazani (wine) =

- Type: Wine
- Origin: Georgia
- Proof (US): 12
- Related products: List of wine-producing regions

Alazani (Georgian: ალაზანი) is a Georgian wine.

== History ==
The wine takes its name from one of Alazani River. As a result of the slightly warmer climate in the Alazani Valley, grapes grown there are sweeter than elsewhere in Georgia.

This wine is made from Rkatsiteli grapes (Georgian რქაწითელი; literally "red stem"). This is one of the oldest variety of grapes in Georgia, with archaeologists having unearthed examples in clay jars from the 3rd millennium BC. Recently Rkatsiteli grapes have been planted in Eastern Europe, the Finger Lakes region of New York and Australia.

It has a semi-sweet flavor with light fruit tones and a straw color that darkens as the wine ages. Alazani white wine goes well with fruit, nuts and desserts.

== See also ==
- Georgian wine
- Sweetness of wine
- List of Georgian wine appellations
