= Vazisubani =

Vazisubani (Georgian: ვაზისუბანი) may refer to:

- Vazisubani, Gurjaani, a village in Gurjaani municipality, Georgia
- Vazisubani, Samtredia, a village in Samtredia municipality, Georgia
- Vazisubani, Tbilisi, a neighborhood in Tbilisi, Georgia
- Vazisubani (wine), a Georgian wine
