= Tvishi =

Tvishi (Georgian: ტვიში) may refer to:

- Tvishi, Tsageri, a village in Tsageri municipality, Georgia
- Tvishi (wine), a Georgian wine
