= Vazisubani (wine) =

Vazisubani (Georgian: ვაზისუბანი, romanized: vazisubani) is an appellation for wines produced in a 62-square-kilometer zone around Vazisubani village in eastern Georgia.

Vazisubani is a dry, still white wine made of two grape varieties: Rkatsiteli and Mtsvane.

== See also ==
- Georgian wine
- List of Georgian wine appellations
