= Usakhelouri =

Variety of grape

Usakhelouri (Georgian: უსახელოური, romanized: usakhelouri) is a naturally semi-sweet Georgian wine. The Usakhelauri grape, from which Usakhelauri red wine is made, is grown on the mountain slopes of the Lechkhumi, in western Georgia, mainly near the villages of Okhureshi, Zubi (Tsageri) and Isunderi. These grapes are scarce and a limited amount of land is available, producing only around three tons of grapes each year, making them highly prized. They are the premier wine grape of Georgia. The name "Usakhelauri" means "nameless" in Georgian, which translates in meaning to a cross between "beyond words", and "priceless". In a very good year, there are only about 1,000 bottles produced in the country, mainly by Teliani Valley, and some by Telavi Wine Cellars. Because of this, its cost is quite high at more than US$50 per bottle, direct from the winery. Usakhelauri contains 10.5–12.0% alcohol, 3–5% sugar and has 5–7% titrated acidity.

== See also ==
- Georgian wine
- Sweetness of wine
- List of Georgian wine appellations
