= Georgian wine =

Wine making in Georgia (country)

Georgia is one of the oldest wine-producing countries in the world. The fertile valleys and protective slopes of the South Caucasus were home to grapevine cultivation and neolithic wine production (Georgian: ღვინო, ɣvino) for at least 8000 years. Due to millennia of winemaking and the prominent economic role it retains in Georgia to the present day, wine and viticulture are entwined with Georgia's national identity.

In 2013, UNESCO added the ancient traditional Georgian winemaking method using the Kvevri clay jars to the UNESCO Intangible Cultural Heritage Lists. The best-known Georgian wine regions are in the country's east, such as Kakheti (further divided into the micro-regions of Telavi and Kvareli) and Kartli, but also in Imereti, Racha-Lechkhumi and Kvemo Svaneti, and coastal areas like Adjara and Abkhazia.

== Etymology ==
The Georgian word for wine, ღვინო (ɣvino), is usually considered a borrowing from Proto-Indo-European *wéyh₁ō, the root word for 'wine'. This root is reconstructed as *wéyh₁ō in Proto-Indo-European, and the word may have been borrowed via the Pre-Armenian ancestor of the Armenian word գինի (gini). (Note: Attributed to multiple sources:) Some researchers suggest the word might have been directly borrowed from Proto-Indo-European, with sound changes occurring as follows: *w to *ɣʷ in Proto-Armenian, and subsequently *ɣw in Proto-Kartvelian. (Note: Attributed to multiple sources:) Others argue that the word might have originated from a native Kartvelian formation, linked to the Proto-Kartvelian root *ɣun- ('to bend'), which can be seen in the modern Georgian verb ღუნვა (ɣunva, 'to bend'). More recently, Zsolt Simon has challenged both the traditional Proto-Indo-European etymology and the proposed borrowing of the word into Proto-Kartvelian from Proto-Armenian. He argues that the Kartvelian word for “wine” may instead represent a Proto-Zan loan into Proto-Armenian. In his analysis, this interpretation provides a more regular explanation of the linguistic evidence. Simon similarly proposes a Proto-Zan origin for the Proto-Armenian word for “juniper”.

== History ==
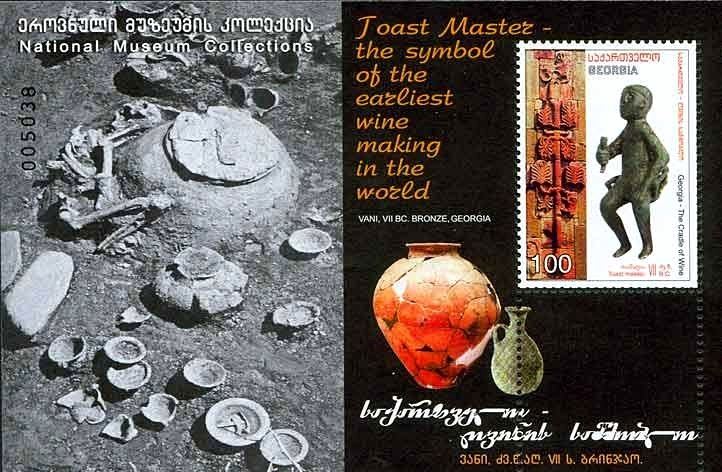
Bronze statue from the 7th century BC discovered during archaeological excavations in the city of Vani. This statue is the statue of a Tamada, a toast master. The sheet also pictures amphora that were used at this time to carry and to stock the wine. Stamp of Georgia, 2007.

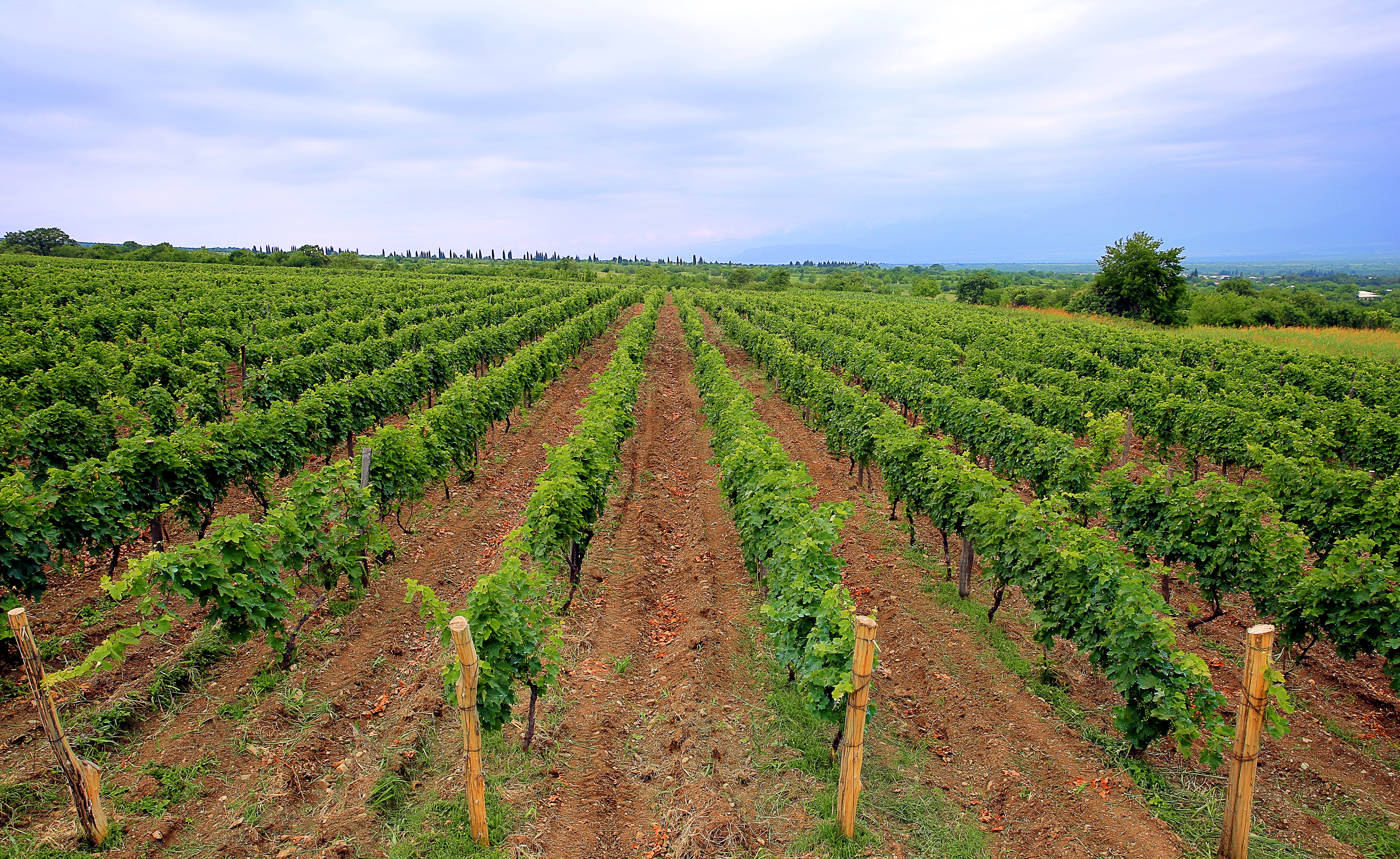
Chateau Zegaani Vineyards in Kakheti.

The roots of Georgian viticulture have been traced back by archeology to when people of the South Caucasus discovered that wild grape juice turned into wine when it was left buried through the winter in a shallow pit. This knowledge was nourished by experience, and from 6000 BC inhabitants of the current Georgia were cultivating grapes and burying clay vessels, kvevris, in which to store their wine ready for serving at ground temperature. When filled with the fermented juice of the harvest, the kvevris are topped with a wooden lid and then covered and sealed with earth. Some may remain entombed for up to 50 years. Due to its diverse and unique microclimate, there are about 500 grape varieties in modern Georgia.

Wine vessels of every shape, size, and design have been the crucial part of pottery in Georgia for millennia. Ancient artifacts attest to the high skill of local craftsmen. Among vessels, the most ubiquitous and unique to Georgian wine-making culture are probably the Kvevris, very large earthenware vessels with an inside coat of beeswax. Not only kvevris were used to ferment grape juice and to store up wine, but also chapi and satskhao; others yet were used for drinking, such as khelada, doki, sura, chinchila, deda-khelada, dzhami, and marani.

The continuous importance of winemaking and drinking in Georgian culture is also visible in various antique works of art. Many of the unearthed silver, gold, and bronze artifacts of the 3rd and 2nd millennia BC bear chased imprints of the vine, grape clusters, and leaves. The State Museum of Georgia has on display a cup of high-carat gold set with gems, an ornamented silver pitcher and some other artifacts dated to the 2nd millennium BC. From classical Antiquity, Georgian museums display a cameo depicting Bacchus, and numerous sarcophagi with wine pitchers and ornamented wine cups found in ancient tombs.

From the 4th century AD, wine has gained further importance in Georgian culture due to the Christianisation of the country. According to tradition, Saint Nino, who preached Christianity in Kartli, bore a cross made from vine wood. For centuries, Georgians drank, and in some areas still drink, their wine from horns (called kantsi in Georgian) and skins from their herd animals. The horns were cleaned, boiled, and polished, creating a unique and durable drinking vessel.

During Soviet times wines produced in Georgia were very popular. In comparison with other Soviet wines from Moldavia and Crimea that were available on the Soviet market Georgian wines had been preferable for Soviets. In 1950, vineyards in Georgia occupied 143,000 acres, but by 1985 this had reached 316,000 acres due to an increase in demand. In 1985 wine production was 881,000 tons. During Mikhail Gorbachev's anti-alcohol campaign, many old Georgian vineyards were cut off.

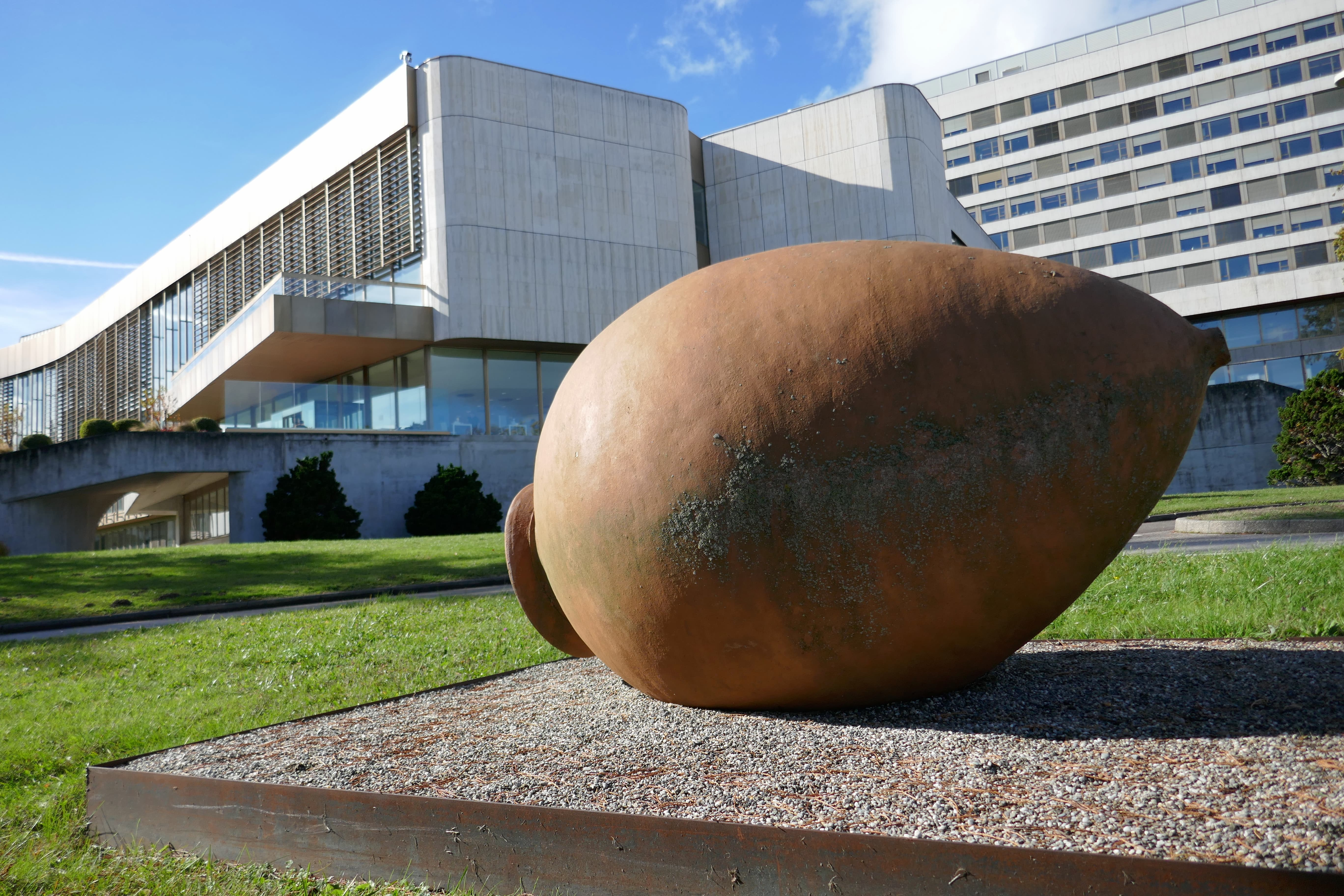
Traditional Kvevri displayed at the United Nations office in Geneva.

As of 2016, Georgia exported 64% of its wine to Russia. Georgian wine has been a contentious issue in the country's recent relationship with Russia. Political tensions with Russia have contributed to the 2006 Russian embargo of Georgian wine, with Russia claiming that Georgia produced counterfeit wine. This was the "official" reason given, but the instability of economic relations with Russia is well known, and Russia uses their economic power for political purposes. Counterfeiting problems stem from mislabelling by foreign producers and falsified “Georgian Wine” labels on wines produced outside of Georgia and imported into Russia under the auspices of being Georgian produced. Some winemakers in Georgia have also been known to import grapes and produce “falsified” Georgian Wine, leading then defense minister Irakli Okruashvili to note in 2006 that “[He thought] several wineries that are still producing fake wine in Gori should be closed”. The shipment of counterfeit wine has been primarily channeled through Russian managed customs checkpoints in the Russian occupied Georgian territories Abkhazia and South Ossetia, where no inspection and regulation occurs.

Georgia is optimistic that its recent Association Agreement with the European Union will expand its export markets and reduce the risk presented by any future unilateral embargoes by Russia.

== Viticulture in Georgia today ==
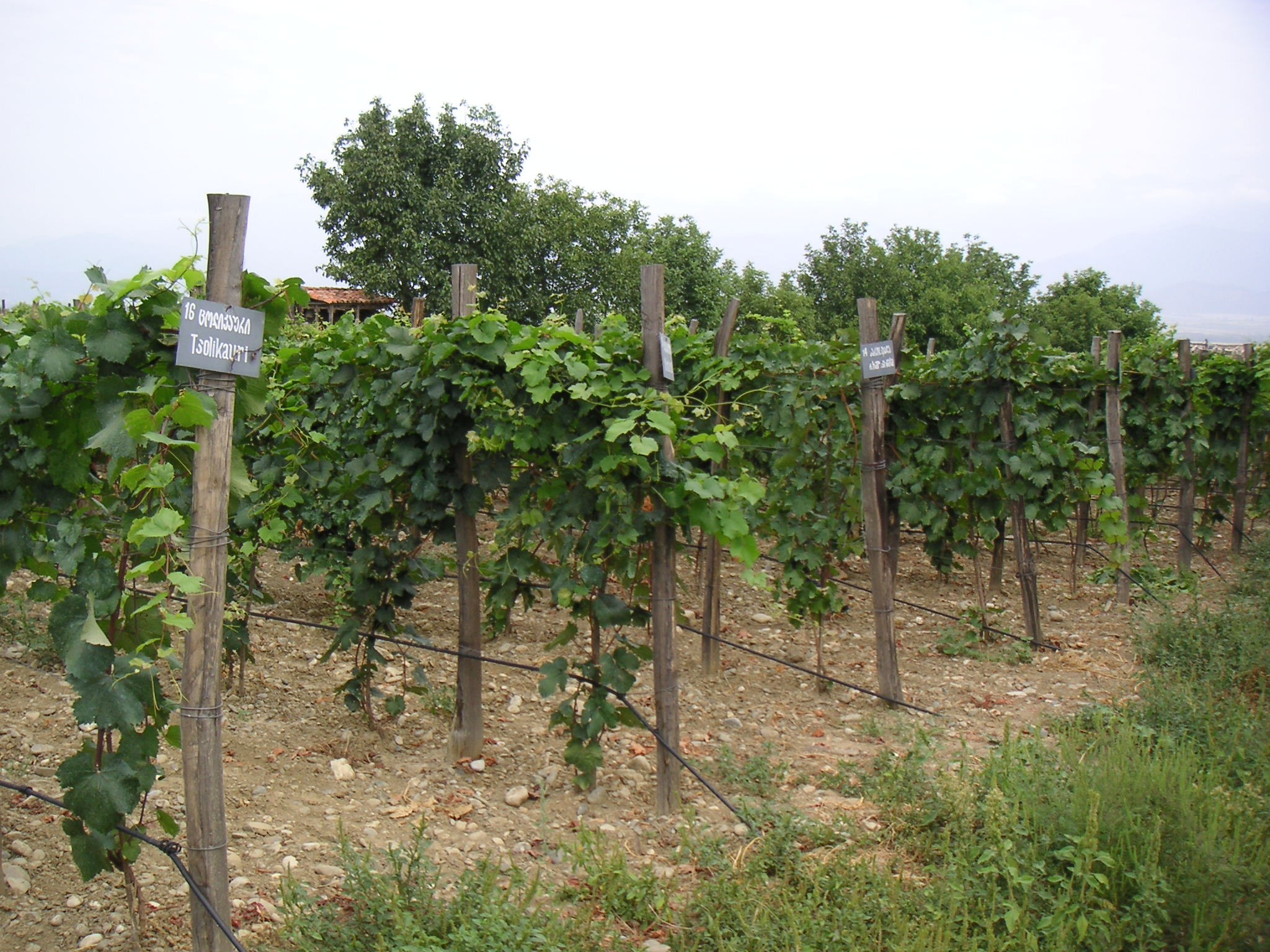
Georgian nursery vineyard.

Georgia ranks 2nd (in terms of volume) in grape production in the former Soviet Union behind Moldova. Its wines had a high reputation in the Soviet Union. Currently, wine is produced by thousands of small farmers (using primarily traditional techniques of wine-making), as well as by certain monasteries and modern wineries. In recent years, a growing number of boutique family wineries have emerged in regions such as Kakheti, Imereti, and Racha, blending ancient qvevri methods with modern marketing and tourism strategies.

According to the Minister of Agriculture of Georgia, wine production has increased from 13.8 million 750ml bottles in 2009 to 15.8 million bottles in 2010. In 2009, Georgia exported 10.968 million bottles of wine to 45 countries. In 2010, Georgia exported wines to Ukraine (about 7.5 million bottles), Kazakhstan (about 2 million bottles), Belarus (about 1.2 million bottles), Poland (about 870,000 bottles), and Latvia (590,000 bottles).

By 2019, exports and production had increased significantly, with the Ministry of Environmental Protection and Agriculture's annual report declaring total export of "94 million bottles (0.75 liter)" to 53 countries, including increases in exports to Russia of 9% (58,384,540 bottles), to China of 2% (7,089,259 bottles), and to the United States of 48% (678,148 bottles).

== Growing conditions ==
Georgia's territorial and climate conditions are optimal for wine-making. Extremes of weather are unusual: summers tend to be sunny and warm, and winters mild and frost-free. Natural springs abound, and the Caucasus Mountains streams drain mineral-rich water into the valleys. Georgia's moderate climate and moist air, influenced by the Black Sea, provide the best conditions for vine cultivating. The soil in vineyards is so intensively cultivated that the grapevines grow up the trunks of fruit trees eventually hanging down along the fruit when they ripen. This method of cultivation is called maglari.

== Georgian grape varieties ==
Traditional Georgian grape varieties are little known outside of the Black Sea region. Now that the wines of Eastern and Central Europe are coming to greater international awareness, grapes from this region are becoming better known. Although there are nearly 400 to choose from, only 38 varieties are officially grown for commercial viticulture in Georgia:

=== Red grapes ===
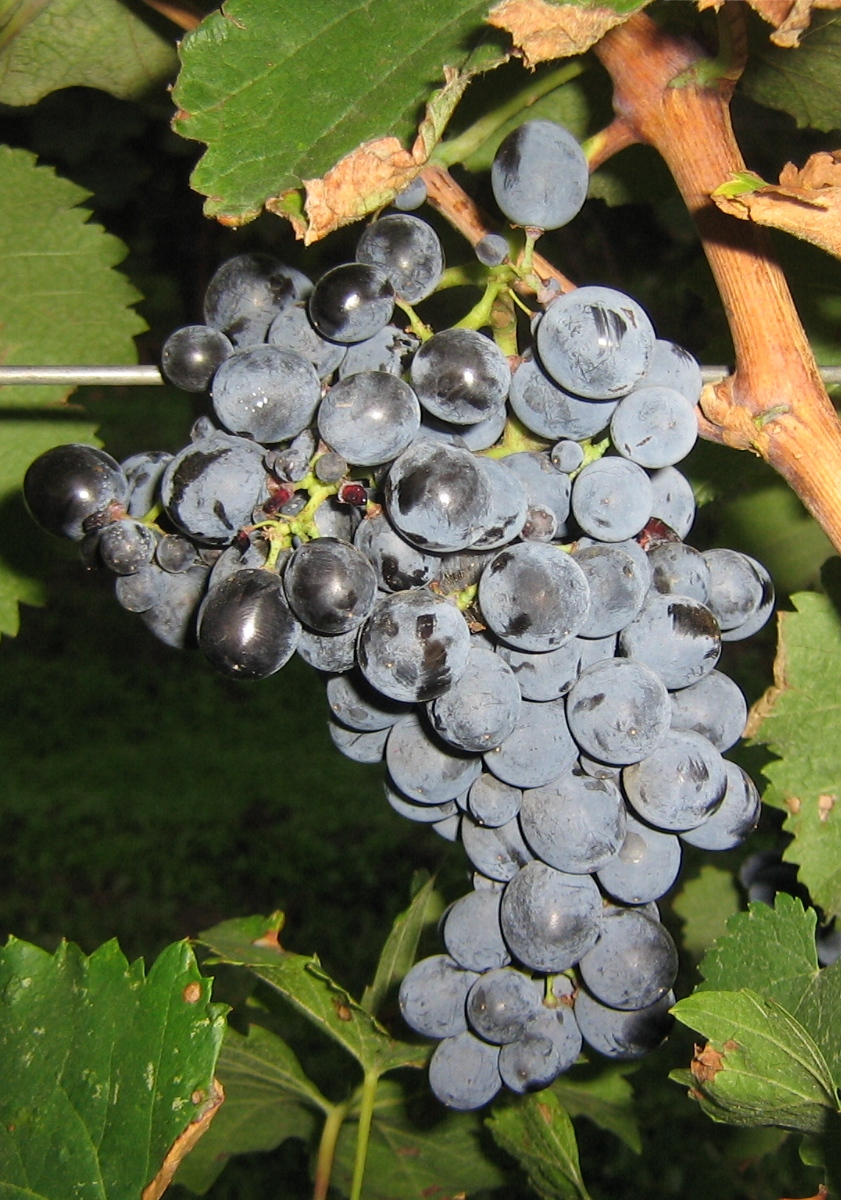
Saperavi grape

- Aladasturi
- Alexandrouli (Alexandreuli, Alexsandrouli)
- Arabeuli Shavi
- Arabeuli Tsiteli
- Asuretuli Shavi (Shala)
- Berbesho
- Chkhaveri
- Chumuta
- Danakharuli
- Dzvelshava
- Gabekhauri Shavi
- Kachichi
- Kakhis Tsiteli
- Kapistoni Shavi
- Meskhuri Shavi
- Mtevandidi
- Mujuretuli
- Otskhanuri Sapere
- Ojaleshi is cultivated on the mountain slopes overhanging the banks of the Tskhenis-Tskali river, particularly in the Orbeli village and Samegrelo district (Western Georgia).
- Paneshi
- Saperavi produces substantial deep red wines that are suitable for extended aging, up to fifty years. Saperavi has the potential to produce high alcohol levels and is used extensively for blending with other lesser varieties. It is the most important grape variety used to make Georgian red wines.
- Skhilatubani
- Shavkapito
- Tamaris Vazi
- Tavkveri
- Usakhelauri is cultivated mostly in the Zubi-Okureshi district in Western Georgia.
- Zakatalis Tsiteli

=== White grapes ===
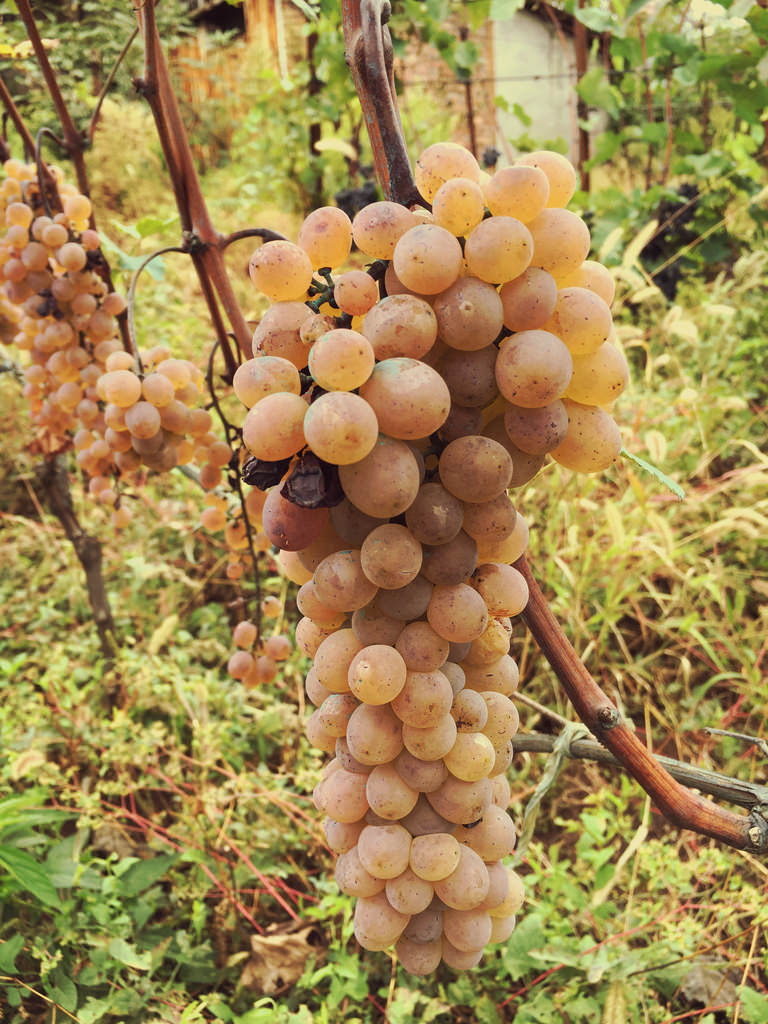
Rkatsiteli grape

- Arabeuli Tetri
- Brola
- Budeshuri Tetri
- Buera
- Chinuri (Chinebuli)
- Chvitiluri
- Dondghlabi Tetri
- Gorula
- Ingilouri
- Kakhis Tetri
- Kapistoni Tetri
- Kisi
- Khikhvi is grown in Kardanakhi.
- Krakhuna
- Kundza Tetri
- Melikuda
- Mtsvane is often blended with Rkatsiteli to impart a fruity, aromatic balance. In the Georgian language Mtsvane means green.
- Mtsvivani kakhuri
- Mtsvivani Rachuli
- Rkatsiteli is the most important grape variety used to make Georgian white wines. It is also grown outside Georgia in Eastern and former USSR countries.
- Sakmiela
- Tsitska
- Tsolikauri
- Tsulukidzis Tetra
- Zakatalis Tetri

== Georgian wine styles ==
Traditionally, Georgian wines carry the appellation name of the source region, district, or village, much like French regional wines such as Bordeaux or Burgundy. As with these French wines, Georgian wines are usually a blend of two or more grapes. Georgian wines are classified as sweet, semi-sweet, semi-dry, dry, fortified and sparkling.

=== White ===
- Pirosmani is a semi-sweet white wine made from a 40% Tsolikauri, 60% Tsitska blend. It has won 3 gold medals and one silver medal at international competitions.
- Tsinandali is a blend of Rkatsiteli and Mtsvane grapes from the micro-regions of Telavi and Kvareli in the Kakheti region.
- Tvishi is a natural semi-sweet white wine made from Tsolikauri in the Lechkhumi region. It has won one gold medal, two silver medals and one bronze medal in international competitions.
- Mtsvane is a dry white wine made from Mtsvani.
- Alaznis Veli is white semi-sweet wine made from the Rkatsiteii, Tetra, Tsolikauri and other industrial grape varieties cultivated in Western and Eastern Georgia. The wine of straw color has a characteristic aroma, a fine, fresh and a harmonious taste. It contains 9-11% alcohol and has 6-7% titrated acidity.
- Anakopia is a white semi-dry table wine made from the Tsolikauri grape variety grown in the Sokhumi and Gudauta districts in Abkhazia. The color range is from light to dark-straw. It has a specific aroma and a subtle fresh taste. The alcohol content in the ready wine is 9-11%, sugar content 1-2 g/100 mL, titrated acidity 5-8 g/L. The wine has been produced since 1978.
- Tbilisuri is pink semi-dry wine produced since 1984. It is made from the Saperavi, Cabernet and Rkatsiteli grape varieties grown in East Georgia. The wine has a rich fruity taste. The alcohol content is 9–11.5%, sugar content 1-2%, titrated acidity 5-7 g/L.
- Khikhvi is a vintage white dessert wine made from the Khikhvi grape variety grown in Kardanakhi. It has a pleasant amber color, a characteristic aroma and a delicate taste. Its strength is 15 vol.%, sugar content 18-20%, titrated acidity 4-8 g/1. The wine has been produced since 1924. At international competitions, it received 4 gold medals.
- Saamo is a vintage dessert white sweet wine is made from the Rkatsiteli grape variety cultivated in the Kardanakhi vineyards of the Gurjaani district in Kakheti. It takes the wine three years to mature. The golden-color wine has an original fine bouquet, a pleasant taste with a harmonious honey fragrance. When ready for use, the wine contains 17% alcohol, 13% sugar and has 4-6 g/1 titrated acidity. It has been manufactured since 1980. At international exhibitions, Saamo was awarded 4 gold and 1 silver medal.
- Gelati is a white dry ordinary wine made of the Tsolikauri, Tsitska and Krakhuna grape varieties cultivated in Western Georgia. The wine of straw color has a characteristic savor with a fruity flavor and fresh harmonious taste. Its strength is 10.0-12.5 vol.% and titrated acidity 5-8%.
- Kakheti is a white table wine made of the Rkatsiteli and Mtsvane grape varieties cultivated in Kakheti. The amber-color wine has a fruity aroma with a vanillic flavor. It is characterized by an energetic, velvety and harmonious taste. Its strength is 10.5-13.0 vol.% and titrated acidity 4-6%. At international wine competitions, the Kakheti wine was awarded one silver and one bronze medal. It has been produced since 1948.
- Bodbe is made from the Rkatsiteli grape variety in the village of Bodbe in the Magaro micro-district, one of the most beautiful places of Kakheti. The wine has a light-straw color, a fine aroma of wildflowers and a pleasing tender taste which give the wine piquancy highly estimated by connoisseurs. The ready wine contains 10.5-11.5% alcohol and has 5-7% titrated acidity.
- Dimi is an Imeretian-type white ordinary wine. It is made from the Tsolikauri and Krakhuna grape varieties grown on small areas in Imereti (Western Georgia) by the old local technique consisting in fermenting the grapes pulp to which some quantity of grapes husks is added. The dark-straw color has a pleasant specific bouquet with a fruity flavor, a fresh harmonious taste and savory astringency. Its strength is 10.5-13.0 vol.% and titrated acidity 6.5-8.0%. The wine has been produced since 1977.
- Gareji is a white dry ordinary wine made of the Rkatsiteli and Mtsvane grape varieties cultivated in Kakheti. The wine has a color ranging from pale-straw to amber, a pleasing bouquet and a full harmonious taste. Its strength is 10.0-12.5 vol.% and titrated acidity 4-7%.
- Ereti is a white dry ordinary wine made from the Rkatsiteli and Mtsvane grape varieties. It has a straw color, a fine fruity bouquet and a full fresh and harmonious taste. Its strength is 10.0-12.5 vol.% and titrated acidity 5-8%.
- Shuamta is a dry wine produced since 1984. It is made from the Rkatsiteli and Mtsvane grape varieties according to the Kakhetian recipe. The wine is of amber or dark-amber color and has a moderately astringent harmonious taste with a fruity aroma. The alcohol content is 10-12%, titrated acidity 4-6 g/L, extractability over 25 g/L.
- Alazani (white), named after Alazani river, is a mid-straw colored semi-sweet wine made from 100% Rkatsiteli. The climate of the Alazani Valley is slightly warmer than that of other wine-growing Georgian regions, making the local grapes sweeter than the rest. It has won one silver and one gold medal in international competitions.

See also list of Georgian wine appellations.

=== Red ===
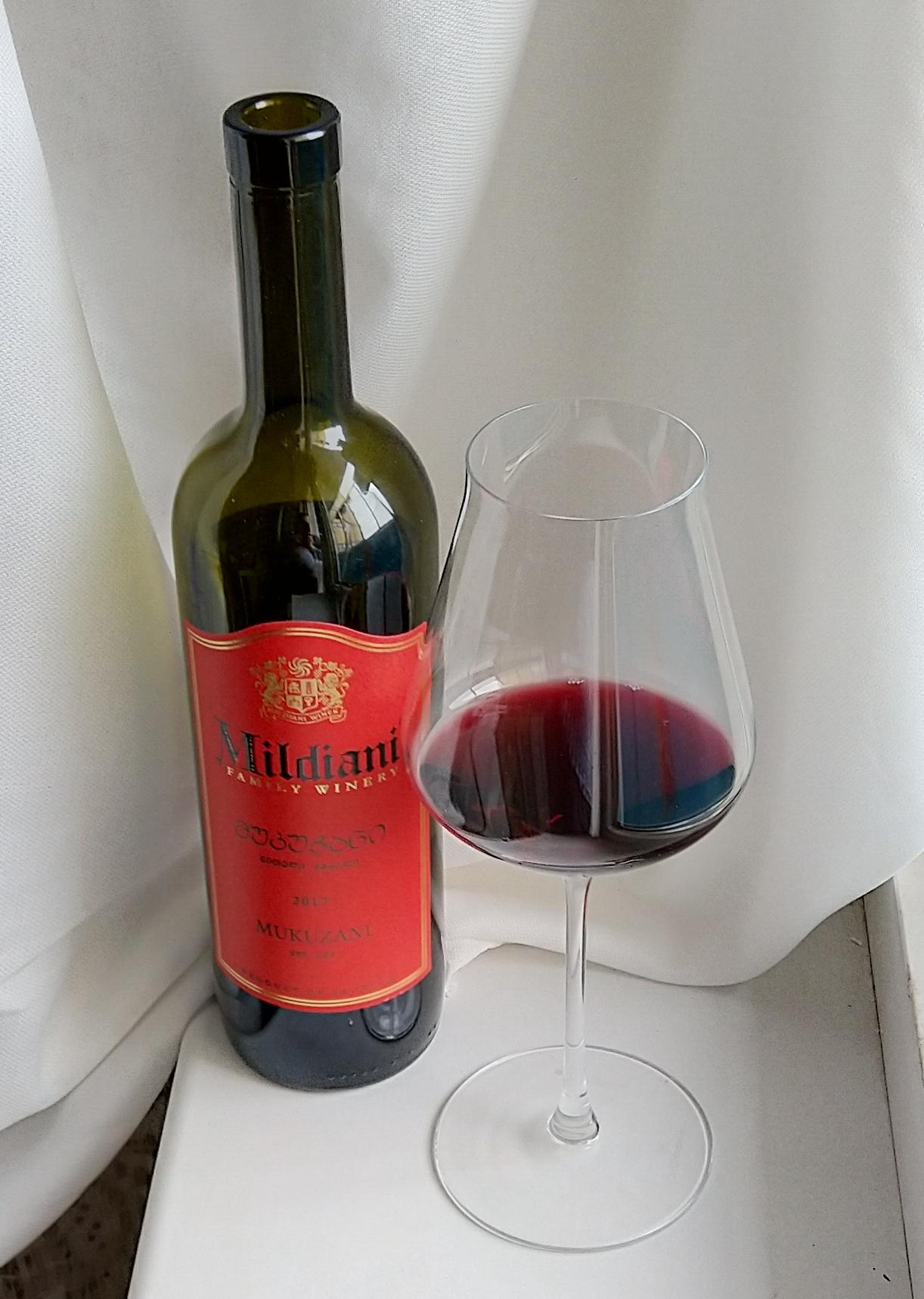
A glass of Mukuzani

- Akhasheni is a naturally semi-sweet red wine made from the Saperavi grape variety grown in the Akhasheni vineyards of the Gurjaani district in Kakheti. The wine has a dark-pomegranate color and a harmonious velvety taste with a chocolate flavor. It contains 10.5-12.0% alcohol, 3-5% sugar and has 5-7% titrated acidity. The wine has been made since 1958. At international exhibitions, it has been awarded 6 gold and 5 silver medals.
- Khvanchkara is a high-end, naturally semi-sweet red wine made from the Alexandrouli & Mudzhuretuli grape varieties cultivated in the Khvanchkara vineyards in Racha, Western Georgia. The wine has a strong, distinctive bouquet and a well-balanced tannin profile with flavors of raspberry. It has a dark ruby color. Khvanchkara wine is one of the most popular Georgian semi-sweet wines. It contains 10.5-12.0% alcohol, 3-5% sugar and has 5.0-7.0% titrated acidity. The wine has been made since 1907. It has been awarded 2 gold and 4 silver medals at various international exhibitions. This wine was Stalin's favorite.
- Kindzmarauli is a high-quality naturally semi-sweet wine of dark-red color. It is made from the Saperavi grape variety cultivated on the slopes of the Caucasian mountains in the Kvareli district of Kakheti. It has a strong characteristic bouquet and aroma, a gentle harmonious and velvety taste. Its taste and curative properties have won Kindzmarauli wide recognition. The wine contains 10.5-12.0% alcohol, 3-5% sugar and has 5.0-7.0% titrated acidity. It has been manufactured since 1942. Kindzmarauli has won 3 gold, 4 silver & 1 bronze medal at international wine competitions.
- Mukuzani is a dry red wine made from 100% Saperavi in Mukuzani, Kakheti. The wine is sourced from the best wines of the vintage that have been fermented at controlled temperatures and with selected yeast strains. The wines are then matured for 3 years in oak to give the wine-added complexity and flavor. Mukuzani is considered to be the best of the Georgian Dry Red wines made from Saperavi. Stalin was said to have treated Winston Churchill to a bottle of Mukuzani at Yalta, explaining that it is his favorite dry red. Afterwards, Churchill would have a case of Mukuzani shipped on an annual basis. It has won 9 gold medals, 2 silver medals and 3 bronze medals in international competitions.
- Napareuli
- Ojaleshi is a red semi-sweet wine made from the grape variety of the same name cultivated on the mountain slopes overhanging the banks of the Tskhenis-Tskali river, particularly in the Orbeli village and Samegrelo district (Western Georgia). Odzhaleshi has dark-ruby color, a gentle bouquet and aroma, a harmonious rich taste with a fruity flavor. It contains 10-12% alcohol, 3-5% sugar and has a titrated acidity of 5-6%.
- Pirosmani is a naturally semi-sweet red wine. It is made from the Saperavi grape variety cultivated in the Akhoebi vineyards of the Kardanakhi village in the Alazani Valley. The wine is fermented in clay jars buried in the ground, an ancient Kakhetian wine-making technique. When ready for use, the wine contains 10.5-12% alcohol, 1.5-2.5% sugar and has 5-7% titrated acidity.
- Saperavi is a red wine made from the Saperavi grape variety grown in some areas of Kakheti. It is an extractive wine with a characteristic bouquet, a harmonious taste and pleasant astringency. Its strength is 10.5-12.5% and titrated acidity 5-7%. It has been produced since 1886.
- Usakhelauri is a naturally semi-sweet wine. It is produced from the Usakhelauri grape variety cultivated mostly in the Zubi-Okureshi district in Western Georgia. Vineyards are arranged on the mountain slopes. The wine has an attractive ruby color, harmonious sweetness with a wild strawberry flavor. It is noted for a pleasant velvety taste, a delicate bouquet and inimitable piquancy. The wine contains up to 10.5-12.0% alcohol, 3-5% sugar and has 5-7% titrated acidity. It has been manufactured since 1943. The word "Usakhelauri" means "nameless" in Georgia. The wine was considered so fine that it was hard for winemakers to find an adequate name for it. At international exhibitions, Usakhelauri has been awarded 2 gold and 3 silver medals.
- Apsny is a naturally semi-sweet red wine made of red grape varieties cultivated in Abkhazia. The wine of pomegranate color has a pleasant aroma, a full and harmonious taste with gentle sweetness. When ready for use, the wine contains 9-10% alcohol, 3-5% sugar and has 5-7% titrated acidity. At an international exhibition, the wine has received one silver medal.
- Lykhny is a naturally semi-sweet pink wine made of the Izabela grape variety cultivated in Abkhazia. The wine has pink color, a specific aroma and a fresh harmonious taste. When ready for use, the wine contains 8-9% alcohol, 3-5% sugar and has 5-7% titrated acidity. At international exhibitions, Lykhny has been awarded one silver and one bronze medal.
- Mtatsminda is a pink table semi-dry wine produced since 1984. It is prepared using traditional technology from the Saperavi, Tavkveri, Asuretuli, Rkatsiteli and other grape varieties grown in Tetritskaro, Kaspi, Gori and Khashuri districts. The wine is characterized by a harmonious taste with a fruity aroma. The alcohol content is 9–11.5%, sugar content 1-2%, titrated acidity 5-7 g/L.
- Aguna is a pink semi-dry wine produced since 1984. It is made from the Saperavi, Cabernet and Rkatsiteli grape varieties grown in East Georgia. The wine has a rich fruity taste. The alcohol content is 9–11.5%, sugar content 1-2%, titrated acidity 5-7 g/L.
- Sachino is a pink semi-dry wine produced since 1984. It is made using traditional methods from the Aleksandreuli, Aladasturi, Odzhaleshi, Tsitska, Tsolikauri and other grape varieties cultivated in West Georgia. The wine is notable for a mild taste, a moderate extractability, a pure aroma and a beautiful color. The alcohol content is 9–11.5%, sugar content 1-2%, titrated acidity 5-7 g/L.
- Barakoni is a naturally semi-dry red wine made from the unique Aleksandrouli and Mudzhuretuli grape varieties cultivated in Western Georgia on the steep slopes of the Rioni gorge in the Caucasian mountains. This top quality wine, of light-ruby color, has a fragrance of violets, natural pleasant sweetness and a tender harmonious taste. When ready for use, Barakoni contains 10-12% alcohol, 1.5-2.5% sugar and has 5-7% titrated acidity. The wine has been manufactured since 1981.
- Salkhino is a liqueur-type of dessert wine made from the Izabella grape variety with an addition of the Dzvelshava, Tsolikauri and other grape varieties cultivated in the Mayakovski district (Western Georgia). It has characteristic ruby or pomegranate color. The alcohol content is 15%, sugar content 30%, titrated acidity 3-7 g/L. At international competitions the wine has received 6 gold medals. It has been produced since 1928.
- Alaverdi (White and Red)
- Alazani (Red) is a light red, semi-sweet wine made from a 60% Saperavi, 40% Rkatsiteli blend. It has won 3 gold medals and 3 silver medals at international competitions. The name comes from one of the major river systems of Georgia that borders Georgia with Azerbaijan. The climate is slightly warmer than the rest of the Georgian Wine growing regions and gives rise to much sweeter grapes than those found elsewhere.
- Rkatsiteli Mtsvani
- Saperavi Dzelshavi

See also list of Georgian wine appellations.

=== Fortified ===
- Kardanakhi is a fortified vintage white wine of the type. It is made from the Rkatsiteli grape variety cultivated in the Kardanakhi vineyards of the Gurjaani district. The wine matures in oak barrels for three years. The amber color wine has a pleasant specific bouquet with a typical port wine flavor and a fine honey fragrance. It contains 18% alcohol, 10% sugar and has 4-6% titrated acidity. It was awarded 8 gold and one silver international medals.
- Anaga is a madeira-type top-quality strong wine made from the Rkatsiteli, Khikhvi and Mtsvane grape varieties cultivated in the Gurjaani, Sighnaghi and Dedoplistskaro districts. The wine has light-golden to dark-amber color, a strong peculiar bouquet, an extractive harmonious taste with a clearly pronounced Madeira touch. The alcohol content is 19%, sugar content 4 g/mL, titrated acidity 3 - 7 g/L. The Anaga wine was awarded 1 international silver medal.
- Sighnaghi is an ordinary strong wine of the port type made from the Rkatsiteli grape variety grown in the Sighnaghi district in Kakheti. The amber-color wine has an extractive harmonious taste with a clearly pronounced fruity touch. The alcohol content 3 g/100 mL, titrated acidity 5 g/L.
- Veria is a fortified vintage white port made from the Rkatsiteli, Mtsvane, Chinuri and other commercial grape varieties grown in Eastern Georgia. The amber-color wine has a peculiar aroma and harmonious taste. Its strength is 18 vol.%, sugar content 7%, titrated acidity 3-7 g/1. At an international wine competition it received 1 gold medal. The wine has been produced since 1977.
- Lelo is a port-type wine made from the Tsitska and Tsolikauri grape varieties grown in Zestaponi, Terjola, Baghdati and Vani districts. The wine has a rich harmonious taste with a fruity aroma and a beautiful golden color. The alcohol content is 19%, sugar content 5%, titrated acidity 6 g/L.
- Marabda is a port-type wine made from the Rkatsiteli grape variety grown in Marneuli and Bolnisi districts. It has a full harmonious taste with a fruity aroma & light-golden color. The alcohol content is 19%, sugar content 5%, titrated acidity 6 g/L.
- Kolkheti is a fortified vintage white port made from Tsolikauri, Tsitska and other commercial white grape varieties grown in Western Georgia. The amber-color wine has a specific bouquet and harmonious taste. Its strength is 18 vol.%, sugar content 7%, titrated acidity 3-7 g/L. At an international competition the wine received one silver medal. It has been produced since 1977.
- Taribana is a port-type wine made from the Rkatsiteli grape variety cultivated in Kakheti. The wine has a mild oily taste, a low sugar content and a beautiful color. The alcohol content is 19%, sugar content 5%, titrated acidity 5 g/L.

== Wine styles ==
- Lelo is a port-type wine made from the Tsitska and Tsolikauri grape varieties grown in Zestaponi, Terjola, Baghdati and Vani districts. The wine has a rich harmonious taste with a fruity aroma and a beautiful golden color. The alcohol content is 19%, sugar content 5%, titrated acidity 6 g/L.
- Akhasheni is a naturally semi-sweet red wine made from the Saperavi grape variety grown in the Akhasheni vineyards of the Gurjaani district in Kakheti, a province of Georgia. The wine of dark-pomegranate color has a harmonious velvety taste with a chocolate flavor. It contains 10.5-12.0% alcohol, 3-5% sugar and has 5-7% titrated acidity. The wine has been manufactured since 1958.
- Khvanchkara is a naturally semi-sweet red wine made from the Alexandrouli & Mudzhuretuli grape varieties cultivated in the Khvanchkara vineyards, near the town of Ambrolauri in the Racha region of western Georgia. It is one of the most popular Georgian semi-sweet wines. Along with Kindzmarauli, it was the favorite wine of the Soviet leader Joseph Stalin. It is of dark-ruby color. It contains 10.5 - 12.0% alcohol, 3 - 5% sugar and has 5.0 - 7.0% titrated acidity. The wine has been made since 1907.

== Wine-producing regions of Georgia ==
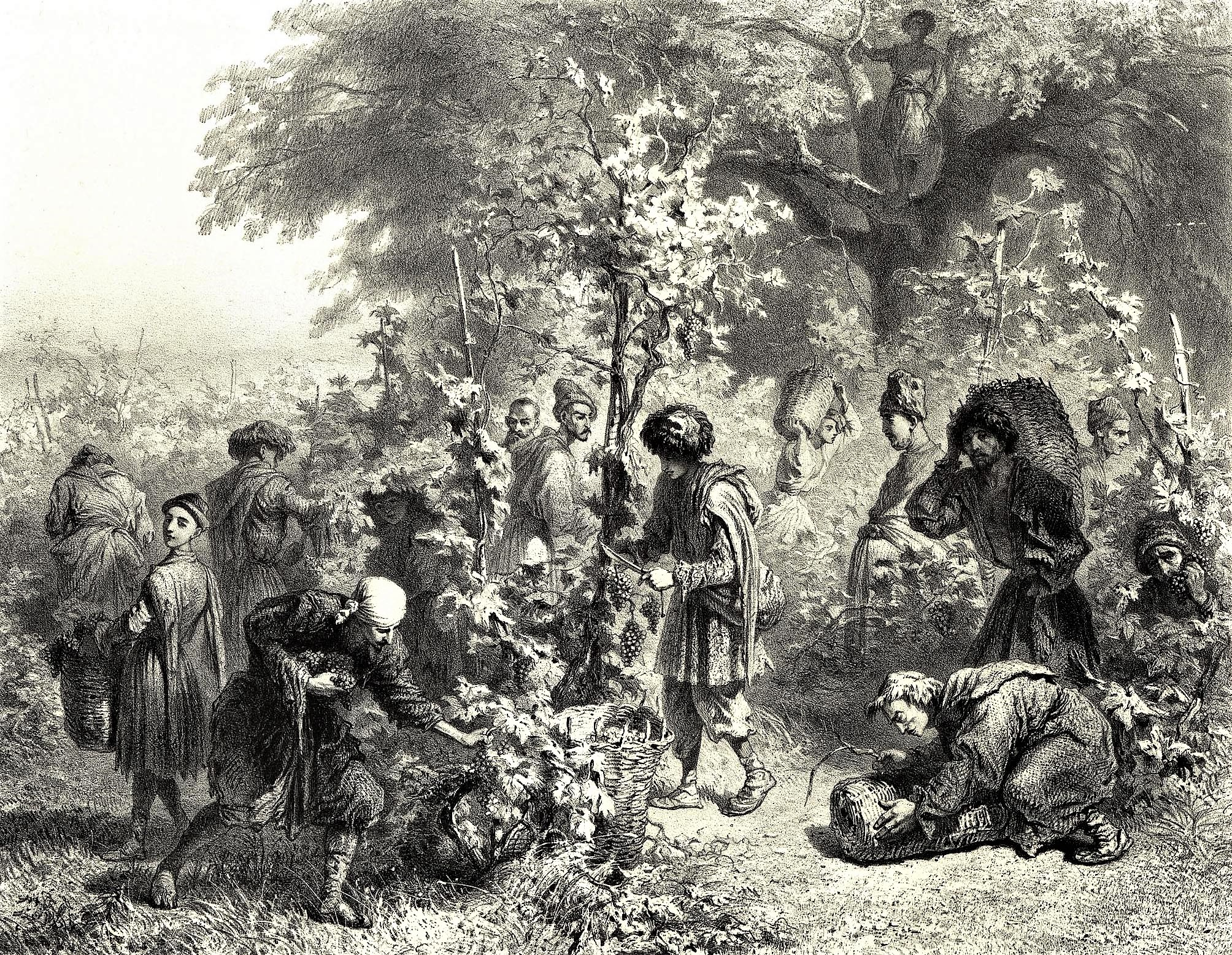
Grape harvesting in Kakheti, as drawn by Grigory Gagarin.

There are five main regions of viniculture, the principal region being Kakheti, which produces seventy percent of Georgia's grapes. Traditionally, Georgian wines carry the name of the source region, district, or village, much like French regional wines such as Bordeaux or Burgundy. As with these French wines, Georgian wines are usually a blend of two or more grapes. For instance, one of the best-known white wines, Tsinandali, is a blend of Rkatsiteli and Mtsvane grapes from the micro regions of Telavi and Kvareli in the Kakheti region.

- Kakheti, containing the micro-regions Telavi and Kvareli
- Kartli
- Imereti
- Racha-Lechkhumi and Kvemo Svaneti
- Adjara

== See also ==
- Old World wine
- Amber wine, a winemaking style believed to have originated in Georgia
- Rtveli, a traditional vintage and rural harvest holiday in Georgia
- Sweetness of wine
- List of Georgian wine appellations
- Winemaking
- Agriculture in Georgia
