= Magarach Ruby =

Variety of grape

Rubinovyi Magarcha
- Grape (Vitis)
- Color of berry skin: Noir
- Species: Vitis vinifera
- Also called: Magarach Ruby and other synonyms
- Origin: Ukraine
- Original pedigree: Cabernet Sauvignon × Saperavi
- Breeding institute: NIViV Natsionalnyi Institut Vinograda I Vina Magarach (National Institute of Vine and Wine Magarach)
- Year of crossing: 1928
- VIVC number: 7088

Magarach Ruby or Rubinovyi Magarcha is a red Crimean wine grape variety that is a crossing of Cabernet Sauvignon and Saperavi. The crossing was carried out at the Magarach viticultural institute at Yalta, Crimea in 1928 in what was then the Soviet Union.

== Synonyms ==
Rubinovyi Magarcha is also known under the synonyms Crossing 56, Magarach 56, Magaracha Rubinovyi, Magaratch 56, Roter Rubin Von Magaratsch, Roubinovy Magaratcha, Roubinoy De Magaratch, Rubin Von Magaratch, Rubinovi Magaraca, and Rubinovyi Magaracha.
