= Tvishi Hydro Power Plant =

Proposed hydroelectric power plant in Tsageri Municipality, Georgia

- Location within Racha-Lechkhumi and Kvemo Svaneti Location within Georgia
- Country: Georgia
- Location: Tvishi, Tsageri Municipality
- Coordinates: 42°30′55″N 42°47′36″E

Reservoir
- Creates: Tvishi

Tvishi Hydro Power Plant

Tvishi Hydro Power Plant will be a large power plant in Tsageri Municipality, Racha-Lechkhumi and Kvemo Svaneti, Georgia two has two turbines with a nominal capacity of 55 MW each having a total capacity of 110 MW.

== See also ==
- List of power stations in Georgia (country)
- Energy in Georgia (country)
