= Chinuri =

Variety of grape

- Grape (Vitis)
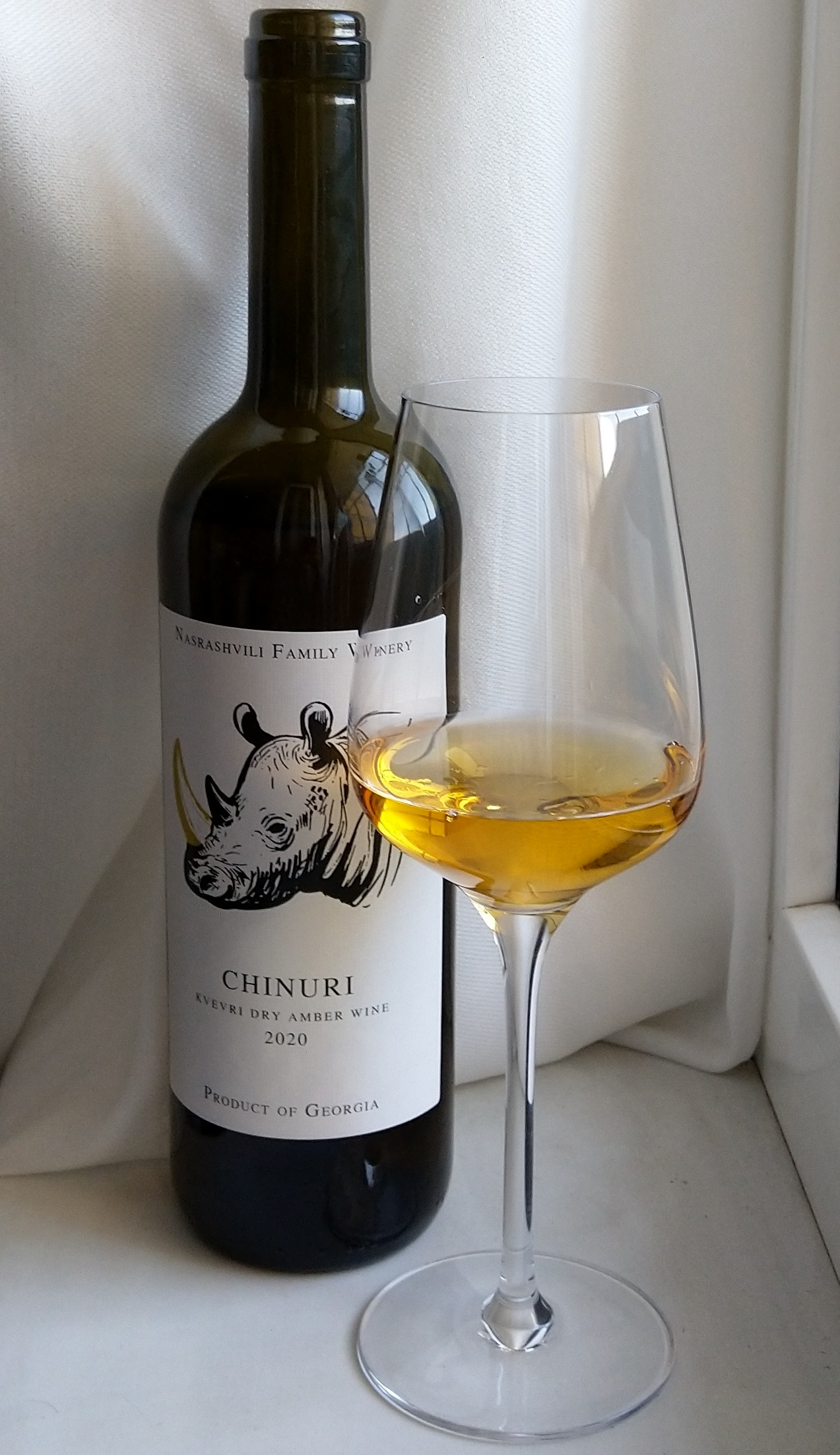
- Chinuri amber wine bottle
- Color of berry skin: Blanc
- Species: Vitis vinifera
- Also called: Kaspuri
- Origin: Georgia (country)
- Notable regions: Kartli
- VIVC number: 2576

Chinuri (Georgian: ჩინური) is a white wine grape variety of high acidity. It is associated with Georgian wine, and is grown in Kartli, reaching full maturity by late October. Chinuri is commonly used for both still and sparkling wines by blending with Goruli Mtsvane and Aligote. It exhibits good resistance to fungal diseases and phylloxera.

== Etymology ==
"Chinuri" is derived from chinebuli, meaning "excellent" in Georgian language.

== See also ==
- Georgian wine
- List of Georgian wine appellations
