= Khikhvi =

Grape variety from Georgia

Khikhvi (/kʰɪˈxvi/; Georgian ხიხვი ) is a grape variety that is grown in Eastern Georgia, specifically in the region of Kakheti.

== Origin ==
The origins of the grape and its name remain uncertain. Khikhvi grape vines are predominantly grown in the east-southeast regions of the province, on the right bank of the Alazani River, with some plantings also present in Kartli.

== Viticulture ==
The vines are distinguishable by their large, three-lobed leaves that are circular in shape and almost round. The medium-sized clusters are conical, winged, and loosely arranged, and the grapes themselves are medium-sized, greenish-yellow, and have thin skins. The buds of the Khikhvi vine typically begin to sprout in the first half of April and reach maturity in September.

== Wine style ==
Khikhvi is used to produce table and dessert wines in European and Traditional Georgian Kvevri methodology. The grapes are known for their high sugar concentration and produce well-balanced, tender-tasting wines with bright greenish and dark coloured hues. Khikhvi is praised for its high quality and is used as an admixture with other wine varieties to improve their softness and aroma. It is also used to produce a good quality dessert wine in the Kardenakhi micro-zone known for its dark yellow color, harmonic taste.

Khikhvi wine is characterised by its moderate alcohol levels and soft acidity, making it suitable for either standalone production as a single varietal wine or as a contributing factor in blending to enhance the high-tones of the blend. Despite its potential, Khikhvi grapes and their resultant wine remain largely under-explored and under-appreciated.
