= Akhasheni, Gurjaani =

Akhasheni ახაშენი
- Location within Georgia
- Coordinates: 41°47′33″N 45°44′50″E
- Country: Georgia
- Region: Kakheti
- Municipality: Gurjaani
- Elevation: 460 m (1,510 ft)

Population (2014)
  - Total: 2.420
- Time zone: UTC+4 (Georgian Time)

Akhasheni (Georgian: ახაშენი) is a village in thr Gurjaani Municipality of Kakheti, Georgia. It is located 8 km north-west of Gurjaani, at an altitude of about 460 m. The population was 2,420 inhabitants in 2014.

Akhasheni is known for the appellation wine of the same name. The village also houses the Akhalsheni Wine Resort hotel constructed through the Ministry of Economy's Enterprise Georgia project, the Bank of Georgia and European Union financial programs and opened in March 2018.

== See also ==
- Kakheti
