= Akhasheni =

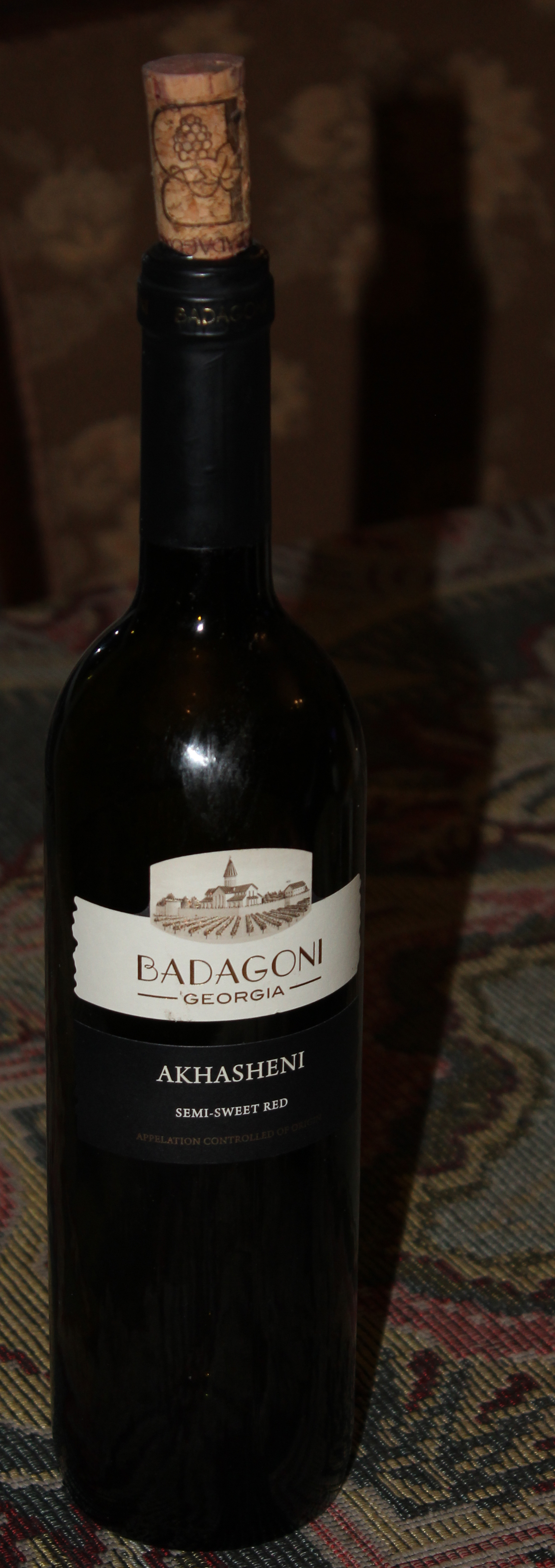
Bottle of Akhasheni

Akhasheni (Georgian: ახაშენი) is an appellation for wines produced in and around the village of Akhasheni in the Gurjaani Municipality of Kakheti, Georgia.

Akhasheni is a naturally semi-sweet red wine made exclusively from the Saperavi grape variety. It is of dark-pomegranate color and has a harmonious velvety taste with a chocolate flavor. It contains 10.5–12% alcohol, 3–5% sugar and has 5–7% titrated acidity. The wine has been manufactured since 1958. Due to the special climate it's produced in, Akhasheni has organoleptic features described as characteristics special to only this wine.

Prior to 1990, Akhasheni has been awarded 11 medals, with 6 of them being gold ones, at various international competitions.

== See also ==
- Georgian wine
- Sweetness of wine
- List of Georgian wine appellations
