= Kindzmarauli =

Georgian wine variety

- Grape (Vitis)
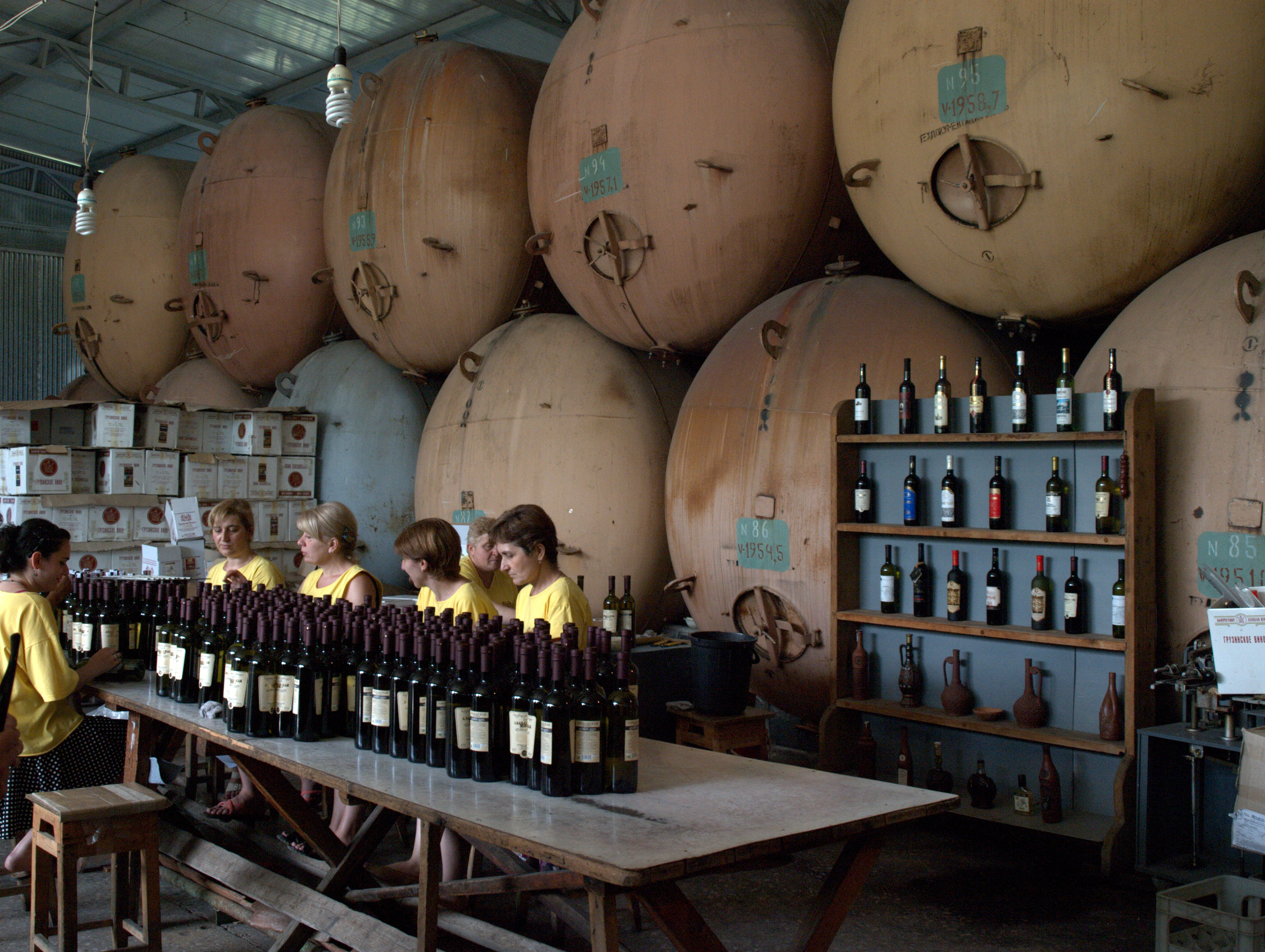
- Origin: Georgia
- Notable regions: Kakheti

Kindzmarauli (Georgian: ქინძმარაული, romanized: kindzmarauli) is a dark red, naturally semi-sweet Georgian wine. It is made from an indigenous grape variety of Saperavi from Kakheti region of the country.

== History ==
During production of Kindzmarauli, the sugar content is maintained naturally. It does not have any chemicals or additives, thus resulting in a finished wine with a sugar content from 3% to 5%, while having an alcohol percentage of 13.0%.

Under the Georgian Law "On Appellations of Origin and Geographical Indications of Goods" of 2010, the name "Kindzmarauli" is now included in the list of Georgian indigenous appellations and may not be used by wine producers outside a specific geographical region.

== See also ==
- Khvanchkara
