= Aleksandrouli =

Variety of grape

- Grape (Vitis)
- Color of berry skin: Noir
- Species: Vitis vinifera
- Also called: see list of synonyms
- Origin: Georgia
- VIVC number: 263

Aleksandrouli (Georgian: ალექსანდროული) is a Georgian red grape variety.

== History ==
The grape is reputed to be one of the oldest and greatest of the Georgian varieties, but is also reported by the Geilweilerhof database as a selected seedling of Muscat of Alexandria. This may reflect two varieties, the Alexandrouli wine grape and the table grape Alexandriuli Muscat.

== Distribution and wines ==
Used in Georgia to produce a semi-sweet red wine known as Khvanchkara or as a medium bodied, semi-dry, chewy blend (with Mujuretuli) having good acids and claimed to have aroma flavours reminiscent of pomegranates.

== Vine and viticulture ==
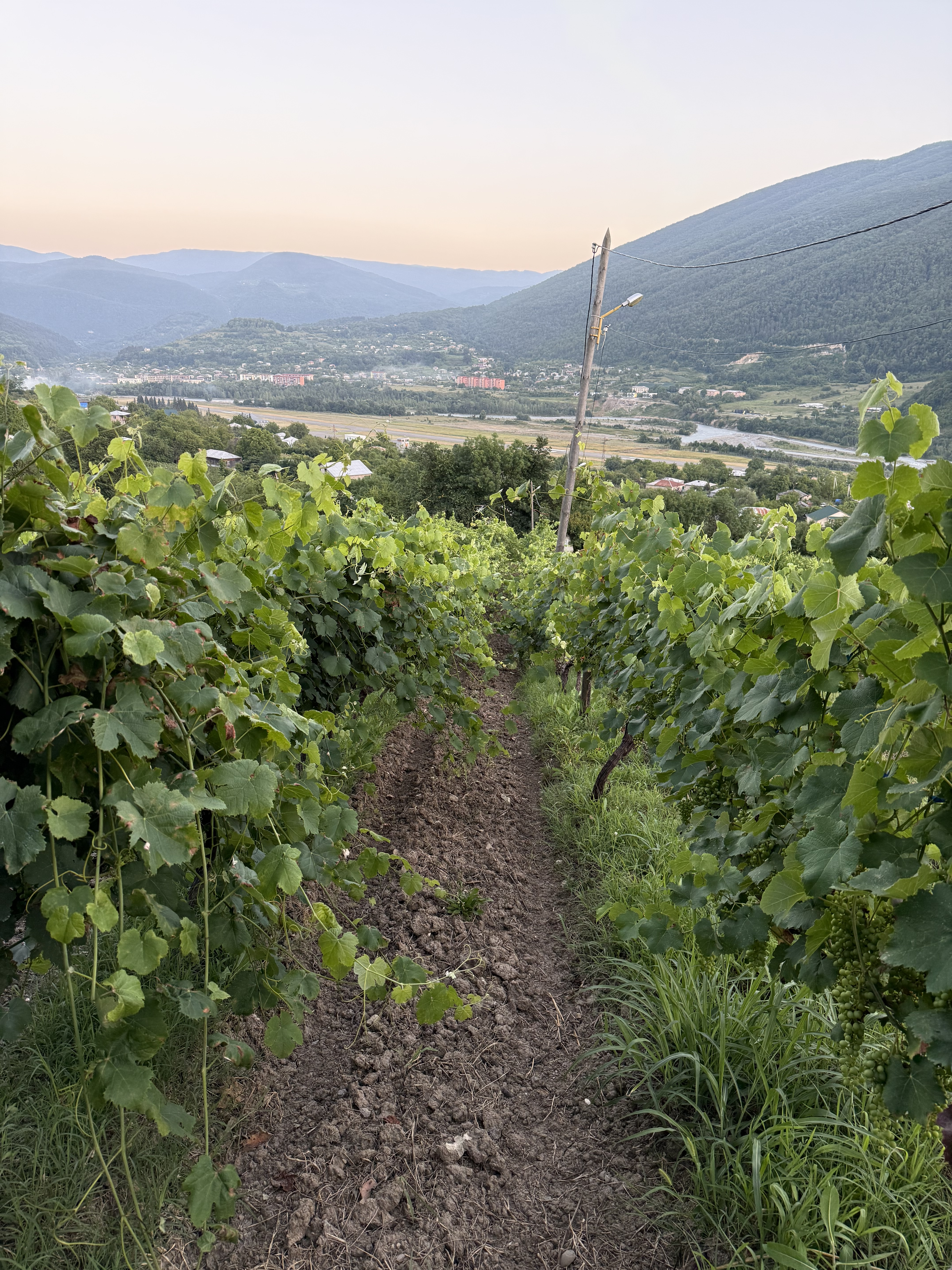
Aleksandrouli vines in a vineyard near Ambrolauri in Racha, the region where the variety is grown

The grape seems to prefer the wetter western half of Georgia.

== Synonyms ==
Alexandrouli is also known under the synonyms Aleksandroouly, Aleksandrouli, Aleksandrouli Shavi, Alexandreouli, Alexandroouli, Alexandrouli, Kabistona, and Kabistoni.

== See also ==
- Georgian wine
- List of Georgian wine appellations
