= Vazisubani, Gurjaani =

Vazisubani ვაზისუბანი
- Location within Georgia
- Coordinates: 41°49′12″N 45°41′28″E
- Country: Georgia
- Region: Kakheti
- Municipality: Gurjaani
- Elevation: 500 m (1,600 ft)

Population (2014)
  - Total: 2,862
- Time zone: UTC+4 (Georgian Time)

Vazisubani (Georgian: ვაზისუბანი) is a village in Gurjaani Municipality, Kakheti region, Georgia. It is located 14 km north-west of Gurjaani, at an altitude of about 500 m. The population was 2,862 inhabitants in 2014.

Vazisubani is known for the appellation wine of the same name. Vazisubani has many religious monuments of interest, including the 10th century Sanagiri Church and Monastery.

== See also ==
- Kakheti
