= Mujuretuli =

Variety of grape

- Grape (Vitis)
- Color of berry skin: Purple
- Species: Vitis vinifera
- Also called: Keduretuli, Mudzhuretuli, Mudshurestuli
- Origin: Georgia
- Sex of flowers: Hermaphrodite
- VIVC number: 263

Mujuretuli (Georgian: მუჯურეთული) is a red wine grape grown in Georgia. It is also known as Mudzhuretuli, Mudshuretuli and Keduretuli.

== History ==
The grape is planted exclusively in its ancestral home Georgia. Since 1907, it has been blended with Aleksandrouli to make Khvanchkara wine.

== Distribution and Wines ==
Used in Georgia to produce a varietal rosé and a medium bodied, semi-dry, chewy blend (with Alexandrouli) having good acids and claimed to have aroma flavors reminiscent of pomegranates.

== Vine and Viticulture ==
It has long clusters of deep purple grapes.

== See also ==
- Georgian wine
- List of Georgian wine appellations
