= Tvishi (wine) =

Georgian wine

Tvishi (Georgian: ტვიში, romanized: t'vishi) is a Georgian wine. It is an appellation for wines produced in a 15 km^{2} (3,700 acres) zone around Tvishi village in northwestern Georgia. The zone is on the right bank of the Rioni River and includes Alpana village.

Tvishi is a dry to semi-sweet, still white wine made from Tsolikouri grapes.

== See also ==
- Georgian wine
- Sweetness of wine
- List of Georgian wine appellations
