= Khvanchkara =

Georgian wine

- Grape (Vitis)
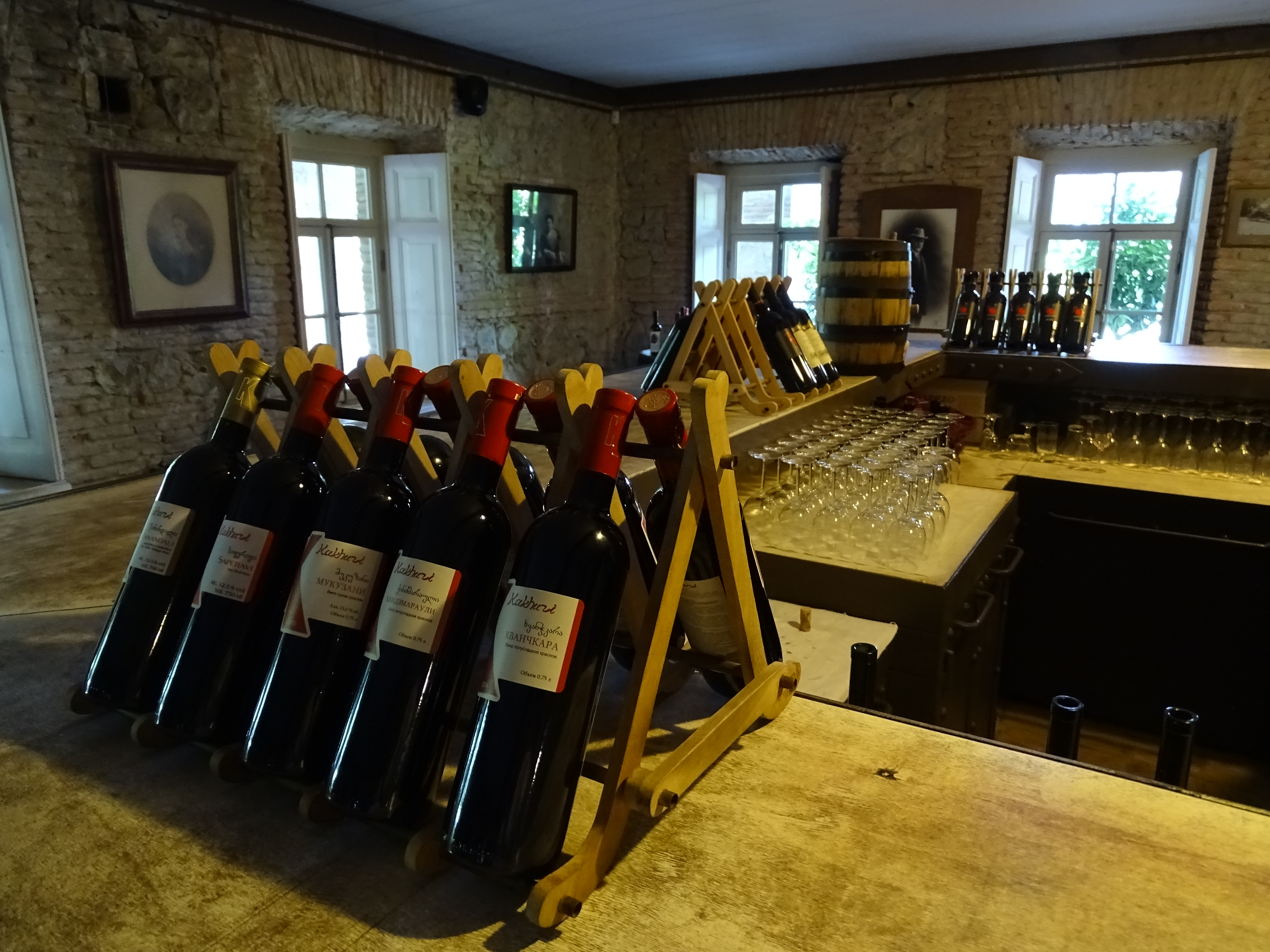
- Origin: Georgia
- Notable regions: Racha

Khvanchkara (Georgian: ხვანჭკარა, romanized: khvanch'k'ara) is a naturally semi-sweet red Georgian wine. It is made from the Aleksandrouli and Mujuretuli grape varieties cultivated in the village of Khvanchkara, near the town of Ambrolauri, Racha region of the country.

== History ==
Khvanchkara wine is one of the most popular Georgian wines. It has a strong specific aroma and a harmonious velvety taste with a raspberry flavor with a dark-ruby color. Khvanchkara contains 10.5 to 12.0% alcohol, 3 to 5 % sugar with 5.0 to 7.0 % titrated acidity. It has been manufactured since 1907. In 2012, the Georgian government acknowledged it as a heritage brand and under the Georgian law "On Controlled Regions of Origin of Wines" of 2010, the name Khvanchkara was included in the list of Georgian appellations and may not be used by wine producers outside a specific geographical region.

== Trivia ==
Alongside Kindzmarauli wine, Khvanchkara was the favourite wine of the Georgian-born Soviet dictator Joseph Stalin.

== See also ==
- Saperavi
