= Tsolikouri =

Variety of grape

- Grape (Vitis)
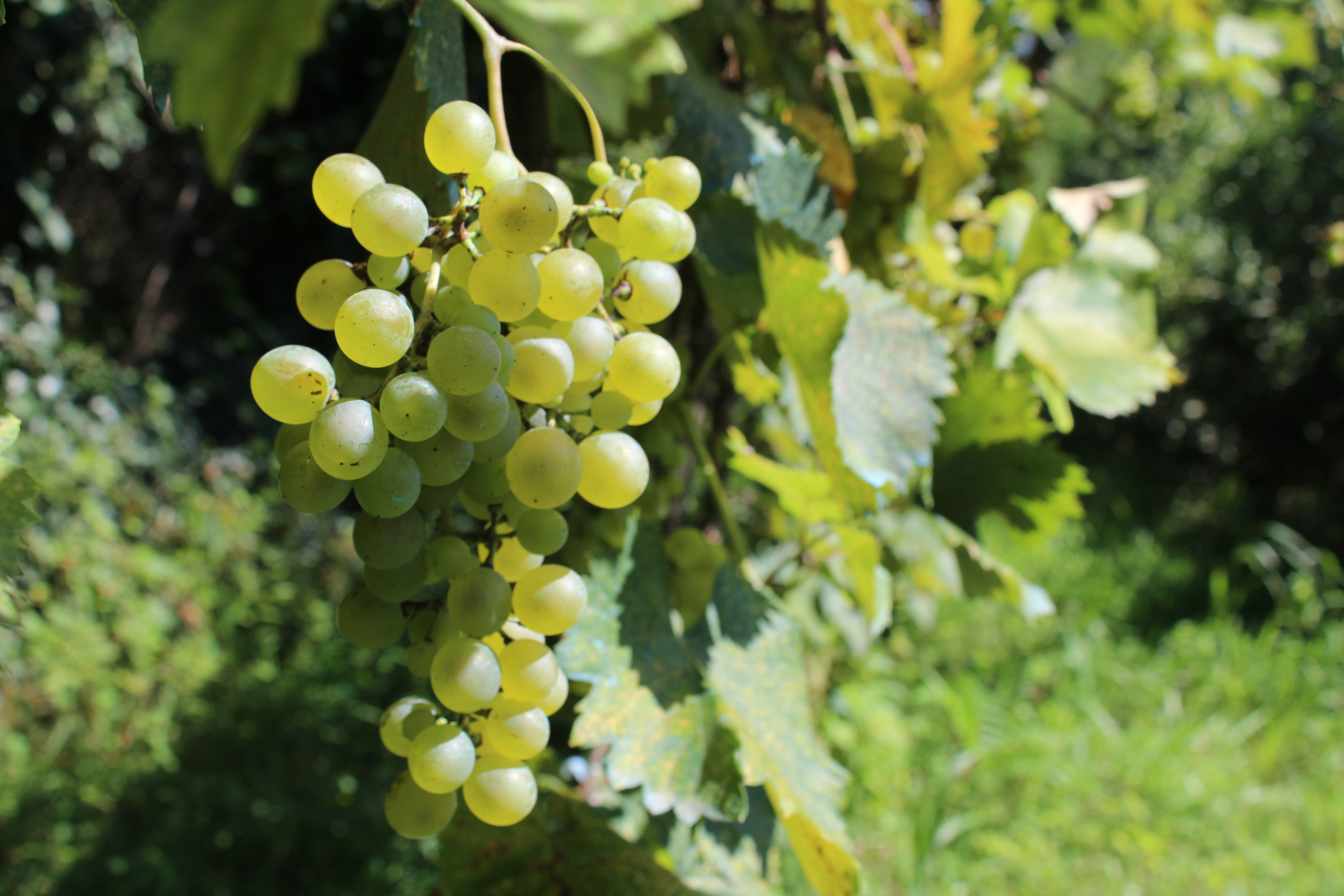
- Tsolikouri.
- Color of berry skin: White
- Notable regions: Imereti district, Georgia
- Notable wines: Tsolikauri, Kolkheti, Lelo, Tvishi
- VIVC number: 12710

Tsolikouri (Georgian: ცოლიკოური) is a light yellow-skinned white grape variety grown mainly in western Imereti district of Georgia. It cultivated in Kolkhida Lowland at an altitude of 160 m (520 ft) above sea level.

Out of 400 different types of grapes in the country, Tsolikouri is among the most widespread varieties. Nearly 90% of vineyards in western Georgia grow Tsolikauri. This sort usually matures by mid October. Grown in Orzhonikidze vineyards during Soviet rule of Georgia, Tsolikouri was considered one of high-quality grapes along with Chkhaveri and Izabella varieties. It has been used for production of premium dry, semi-sweet and semi-dry wines. Tsolikauri, Kolkheti, Lelo, Tvishi wines are made from Tsolikouri grapes. According to former Soviet statesman Vyacheslav Molotov, Tsolikouri was one of favorite wines of Soviet leader, Joseph Stalin.

== See also ==
- Georgian wine
