= Mtevandidi =

Variety of grape

- Grape (Vitis)
- Species: Vitis vinifera
- Also called: Akido, Achido, Didd Metvana, Didmtevana, Didtevano
- Origin: Georgia (country)
- Notable regions: Guria
- Hazards: Parasites
- VIVC number: 8114

Mtevandidi (Georgian: მტევანდიდი) is an indigenous red grape variety from the region of Guria in the country of Georgia, primarily used for producing table wine. It is known also by the synonyms Akido ("two-bunched sprout"), Achido, Didd Mtevana, Didmtevana, and Didtevano. There are no written sources regarding the origin of Mtevandidi. Botanical and agricultural features suggest that this variety is indigenous to Georgia.

== History ==
Mtevandidi is a productive grapevine variety mostly used for making wine in Guria, particularly in its eastern part; wherein vines were cultivated as high-formations, which even if neglected can maintain growth, development, and quality.

Since the second half of the 19th century, high vineyards of Mtevandidi were massively destroyed due to the spread of fungal diseases and phylloxera, . By the initiative of local residents, concerned with viticulture issues, in Chokhatauri and Makharadze (the villages Kalagoni, Dablatsikhe, and Baghdati) in 1905 and 1906 grafts of Mtevandidi were cultivated as low vineyards, some of them still in existence even today, and characterized with high productivity and normal development of vines.

The modern area of Mtevandidi cultivation is limited, even though it is characterized with high quality production.

== Description ==
For the young shoot, the cone of growth is white in the young slightly reddish on one side and covered with thick felt-like white coating. The opened first leaf is covered with white-reddish down, on the underside is covered with a thick-felt like coating, the petiole is also covered with a reddish white coating; the following second and third leaves are lightly coated on the topside, which is grayish and downy. On the underside is a thick felt-like coating; the petiole of the third and fourth leaves is bright-green; violet on one side and slightly covered with hairy down. The young shoot is bright green on one side, while on another – violet, and lightly covered with a grayish hairy coating that becomes more extensive to the tip of a shoot.

The mature one year sprout is middle sized, bright reddish-brown with dark lines; the axils are darker in color and are distanced by 10–18 cm.

The well-developed leaf is bright green, slightly yellowish, middle-sized or large; is roundish or slightly oval, unnoticeably lobed, about 17.9–21.5 cm long and 18.6–19.6 cm wide. The incision of the petiole is lyre-like, consisting of three veins, having rounded or sharp basis. Elliptical incisions can also be found. The upper incision of a leaf is open and slightly cut, with sharp or rounded basis. The lower incision is opened and cut insignificantly The leaf is three-lobed; without secondary margins. The margin of a tip to the blade creates an obtuse angle. The teeth of tips are triangular, slightly convex-sided and it is possible to find roundish triangular or saw-like teeth. The secondary teeth are similar to the major teeth. The leaf takes a similar curved shape to a funnel. The surface of a leaf is smooth or wrinkled like a net. The underside is covered with a short-downy coating. The major veins are lightly coated and are bright green. The proportion of the pedicel to the major vein is 0.9–1.0, and is bare and bright green.

The flower is hermaphroditic with normally-developed pistil and stamens. There are about five or rarely four stamens in a flower, which are as long as the pistil. The number of flowers in an inflorescence is 300–500.

The pedicel of a bunch equals 8–12 cm; the bunch is about 15–17 cm long and 11–14 cm wide. There are about 100–130 berries on a bunch; the size of an average bunch is 12–14 cm long and 9–12 cm wide, consisting of 80–90 berries. The bunch is thin, unstructured, wide cone-shaped or branched, or quite dense; the pedicel of a bunch is woody nearly up to the middle and bright red-brownish, while its remaining part, including scion, is grass-like and bright green.

The pedicel of a berry, including the receptacle, equals 5–9 mm, and is green. The receptacle is slightly yellowish, with abright green tone, is wrinkled and narrow cone-shaped, rarely wide – cone-shaped and the berry is firmly attached to it. The berry is a bluish-black and middle-sized – about 15.3 mm long and 13.4 mm wide. Large berries are 17 mm long and 15.8 mm wide, while small berries – 9 mm long and 8 mm wide. The berry is oval, wider in the middle part, with a rounded end and; this is thick-skinned and symmetrical, quite fleshy and juicy. The skin is covered with thick waxy spots. The ripening of berries on a bunch occurs unequally- a characteristic feature of Mtevandidi.

There are 1–4 seeds (usually one) in a berry. The seed is 7–8 mm long and 3–4.5 mm wide, is brown, while to the inside bright yellow. The basis is placed nearly in the middle of the rear, is oval, rarely triangular; its backside is triangular. The beak is rusty-colored, and about 2 mm long .

== Cultivation ==
The vegetation period from budding to full ripening lasts 208–216 days, and until leaf-fall 236 – 240 days. The vegetation period of high vineyards is 10 – 15 days less than that of low vineyards due to the impact of fungal diseases and early fall of leaves, whereas, in low vines, if cultivated properly, the leaf-fall lasts even through to December. The break of buds begins from beginning of April, the blossom period from the end of June according to the observation held in Chokhataruri district, Dablatsikhe-Sakvavisti zone. The ripening of the grape occurs at the end of August (26-28) or the beginning of September, while the full ripening – from 20–25 October. Flower-fall takes place from mid-November to the first half of December.

In Chokhatauri and Makharadze districts, the sediment (1280-1540mm) and abundance of sun (sum of 4000º) can result in the prolonging of Mtevandidi's vegetation period, but the vine manages its full ripening during the above-mentioned period.

In Baghdati and Dablatsikhe zones, the growth-development is so much influenced by ecological conditions that the length of shoot can reach 2.25m.

The harvest of one vine when loaded with 8-12 buds totals 2.5 - 4.0 kg, meaning 120 centners per hectare. The coefficient of harvest is 1.5. The shoots generated from substitute buds are characterized by average growth, giving a 1.1 coefficient of harvest. Shoots generated from dormant buds can grow but are more productive. Such productivity in Bagdati zone is caused by soil conditions and secondly during the irrigation during full harvest.

== Durability ==
In the warm and wet climate of Guria, Mtevandidi is susceptible to disease. High-growing vines get infected most commonly, due to the difficulties of cultivation and aftercare. Lower area vines are treated with pesticide on time and, if all guidelines are followed, the vine is protected from diseases. Observation shows that its durability against pests and diseases is strong (Chkhaveri, and Nakashidzis Jani). Its durability against oidium, when cultivated, is low and if necessary actions are not taken- such as treatments with sulphur to protect the vine from oidium diseases –the entire harvest can be lost. Data of the testing station in Telavi (Telavi zone) shows that Mtevandidi is resistant to diseases, which can be explained by dry ecological conditions. In the Imereti mountains the durability of Mtevandidi against pests and diseases is strong, and that is why it is not spread widely and it provides a low yield. If well treated, Mtevandidi, engrafted on a rootstock is characterized by strong growth-development and regular productivity. Mtevandidi's durability against phylloxera has been less studied. From rootstock vine types, the best results for Mtevandidi can be brought from hybrids of RipariaXRupestri-3309. Mtevandidi engrafted on this rootstock is characterized by high growth-development.. Mtevandidi is not much bothered by soil condition. It develops successfully in a wide range of elevations.

== Bibliography ==
- Demetradze V., Materials for Dividing Western Georgian Viticulture-Enology Industry into Regions and Specialization. Kutaisi, 1936.
- Ketskhoveli N., Zone of Cultural Plants in Georgia. Tbilisi, 1957.
- Orbeliani Sulkhan-Saba., Georgian Dictionary. Tbilisi, 1928.
- Ramishvili M., Vine Types of Guria, Samegrelo and Adjara. Tbilisi, 1948.
- Cholokhashvili S., Viticulture, Vol. II, Ampelography. Tbilisi, 1938.
- Javakhishvili Iv., Economic History of Georgia, T.II. 1934.
