= Mukuzani =

Georgian wine

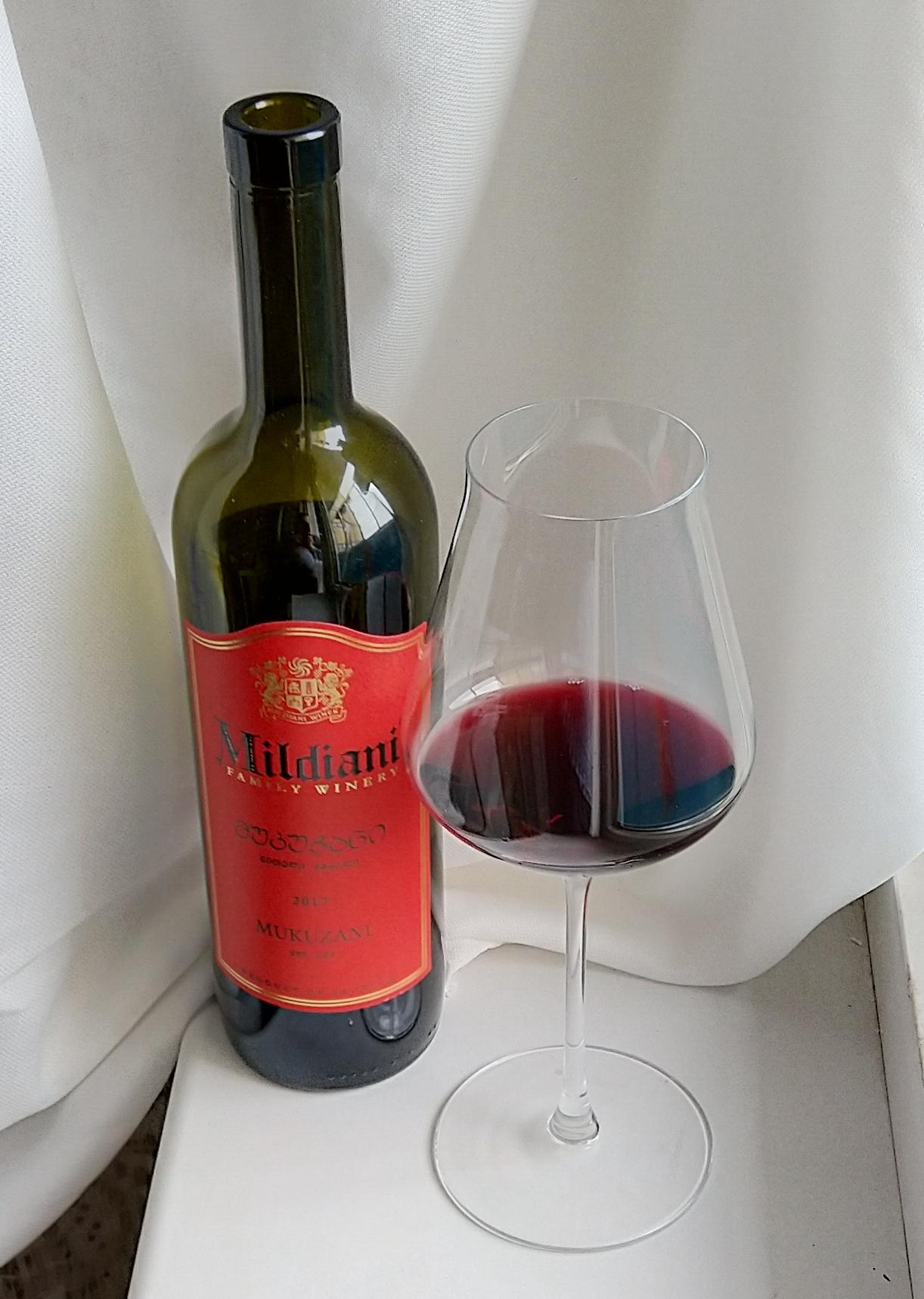
Mukuzani

Mukuzani (Georgian: მუკუზანი muk’uzani) is a dry red Georgian wine made from Saperavi grapes in Mukuzani, Kakheti. Mukuzani is distinct from the other wines made from the same grapes in that it is aged in oak casks for a longer time – at least three years.

Mukuzani has a deep red color with a soft smoky scent of oak and berry. The taste begins dry but the oak and fruit flavors quickly come through. As a result of its longer aging, Mukuzani has more complexity than the other wines made from Saperavi grapes. It goes particularly well with steaks and dark meats.

The matured wine contains 10.5–12.5% alcohol and has 6.0–7.0% titrated acidity. It has been produced since 1888.

Mukuzani is considered by many to be the best of the Georgian red wines made from Saperavi. It has won 9 gold medals, 2 silver medals and 3 bronze medals in international competitions.

== See also ==
- Georgian wine
- Sweetness of wine
- List of Georgian wine appellations
