= Kvevri =

Earthenware vessel for creating wine

Kvevri or qvevri (Note: Both kvevri and qvevri are used in sources of this article. The confusion is caused by difficulties of the Romanization of Georgian. The Georgian language has two k sounds: ქ /k⁽ʰ⁾/ (similar to English) and კ /kʼ/. The official transliteration systems would spell the word as kvevri (National System) or k'vevri (ISO 9984). Qvevri is a product of an unofficial transliteration system mostly used online. QWERTY-derived Georgian keyboard maps letter ქ /k⁽ʰ⁾/ to Q and კ /kʼ/ to K. Therefore, in Georgian you must type QVEVRI to get ქვევრი.) (Georgian: ქვევრი [ˈkʰvɛvɾi]) - also known as ch'uri (Georgian: ჭური [ˈtʃʼuɾi]) in Western Georgia - are large earthenware vessels used for the fermentation, storage and aging of traditional Georgian wine. Resembling large, egg-shaped amphorae without handles, they are either buried below ground or set into the floors of large wine cellars. Kvevris vary in size: volumes range from 20 to 10,000 liters (4.4 to 2,199.7 imp gal; 5.3 to 2,641.7 U.S. gal), with 800 liters (180 imp gal; 210 U.S. gal) being typical.

== History ==
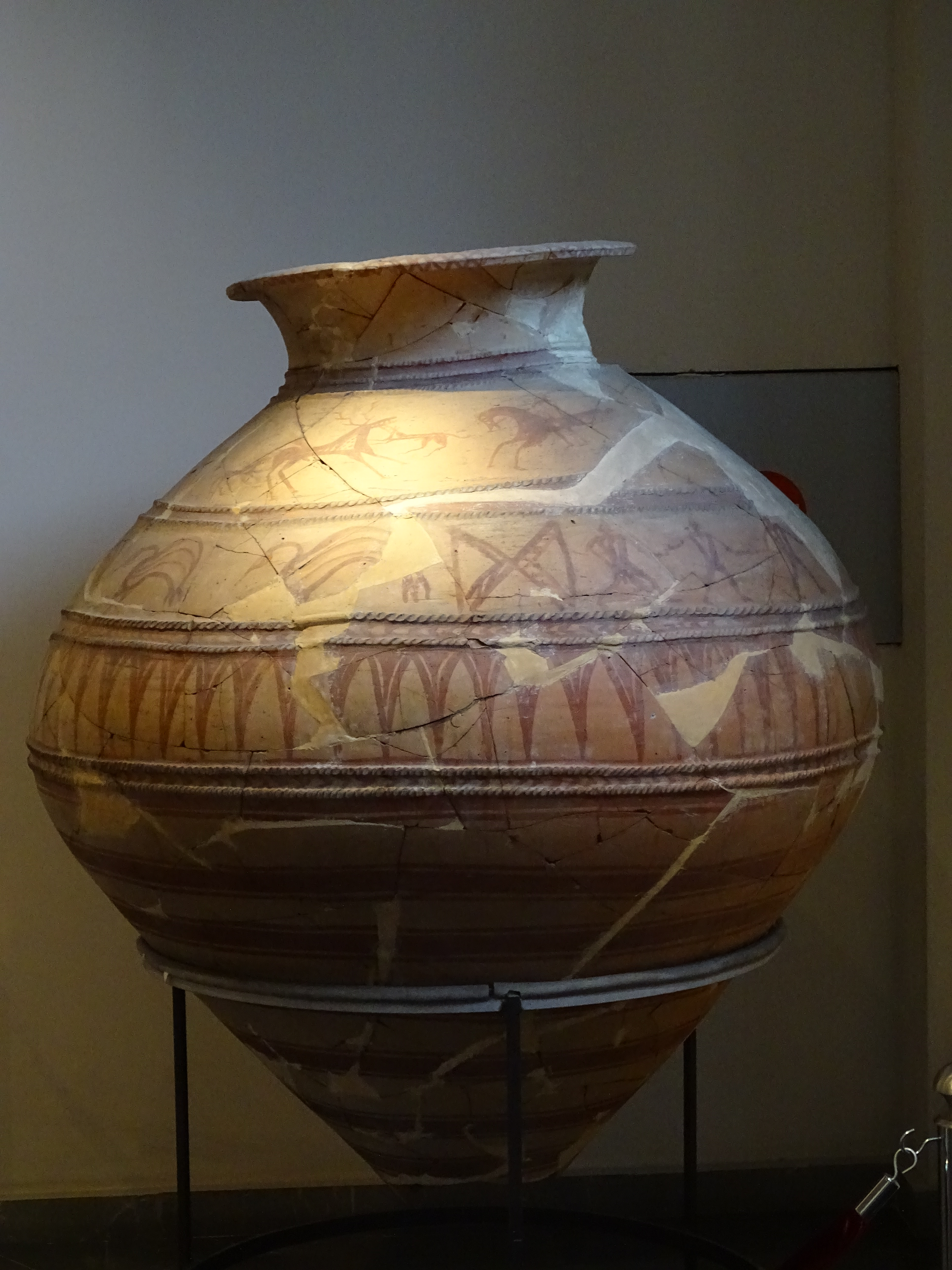
A large kvevri held at the Georgian National Museum of Tbilisi

Archaeological excavations in the southern Georgian region of Kvemo Kartli (notably at Dangreuli Gora, Gadachrili Gora and in the village of Imiri) uncovered evidence of grape pips and kvevris dating back to the 6th millennium B.C.

The villages of Atsana in Guria; Makatubani, Shrosha, Tq'emlovana and Chkhiroula in Imereti; and Vardisubani in Kakheti are traditional kvevri-making areas. Artisanal families have passed down the knowledge of this ancient handicraft through the generations. The clay used to manufacture a kvevri must be carefully chosen, as its characteristics will influence the wine's mineral content.

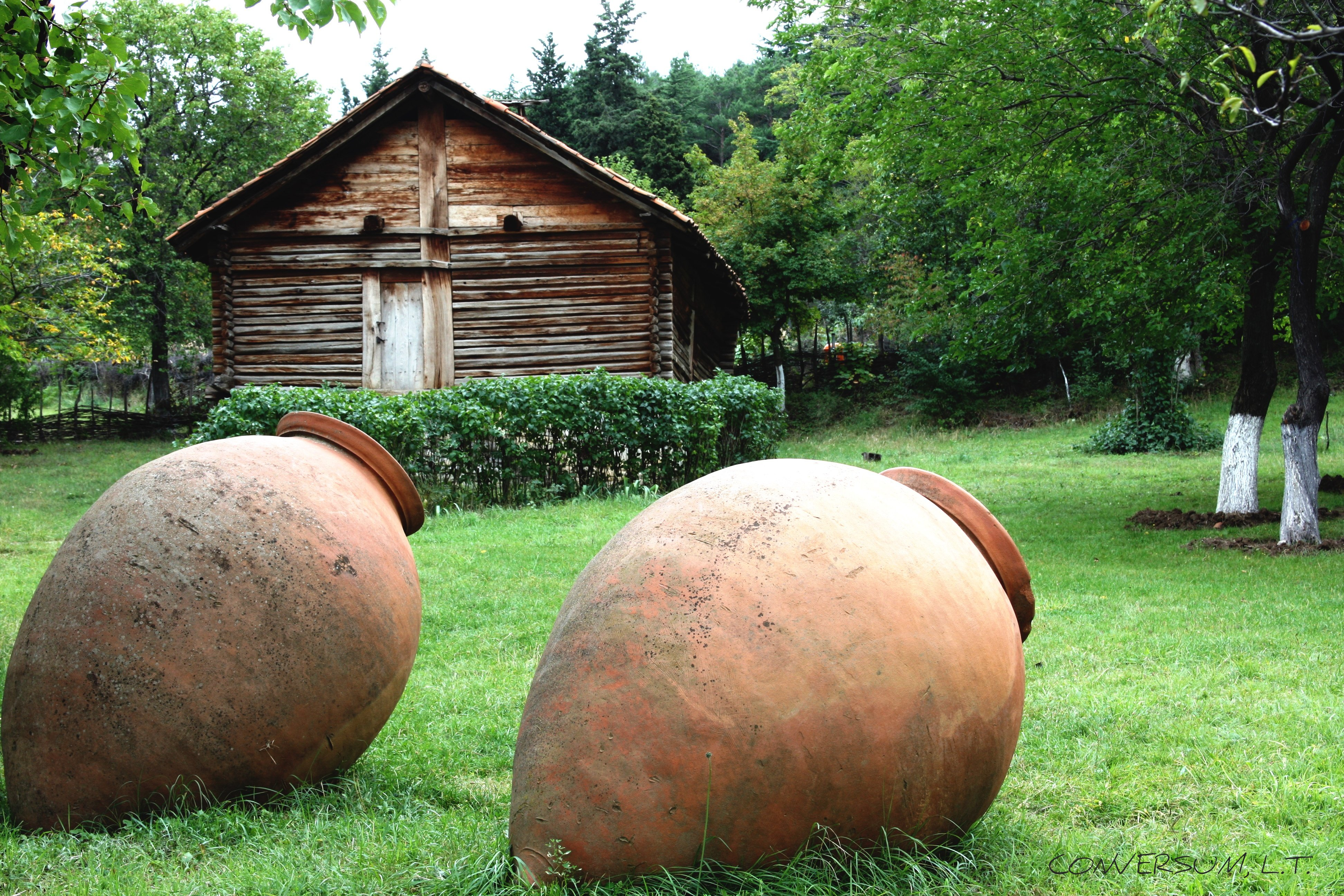
Kvevris above ground

The process of making wine in kvevri involves pressing the grapes and then pouring the juice, grape skins, stalks and pips into the kvevri, which is then sealed. The juice is then left to ferment into wine for at least five to six months before being decanted and bottled. The pomace (mash of pips, skins and stalks) which remains is called chacha in Georgian. It is distilled into brandy which is also called chacha. The empty kvevri is then washed, sterilized with lime and re-coated with beeswax, ready to be filled again.

Traditional Georgian wines do not represent a uniform style. A common feature is that their vinification is carried in kvevri completely buried in the ground, so that even the outlet neck of it remains below ground level. The most unusual and archaic, out of the traditional Georgian wines are white Kakhetian wine (also known as orange or amber wine), macerated for several months with the skins, seeds and stems of grapes in buried kvevri. “Kakhetian method" is an extreme current of Georgian wine making tradition, while the moderate faction represents the so-called "Imeretian method". From "Kakhetian method, it differs in amount and quality of the chacha (pomace) used. The Imeretian method uses only part of the chacha, roughly one-tenth, and stems are not used at all. The rest of the production process proceeds in basically the same way. The result is a wine much closer to European standards, not as tannic as the traditional Kakhetian wine, although in this case a long maturation in kvevri gives them the undisputed Georgian stigma. Intermediate place between the Kakhetian style and Imeretian style represents the traditional white wine from province Kartli (Central Georgia), where the one third of chacha with stems is added to kvevri.

In the past, kvevri were also used for storing brandy, grain, butter, cheese and a variety of other perishable foodstuffs, although in Georgia they have always been primarily used for wine-making. Large ceramic storage vessels such as these are made in many countries, but only Georgia, Spain (vino de tinaja, vino de pitarra) and Portugal (vinho de talha) use them for wine-making.

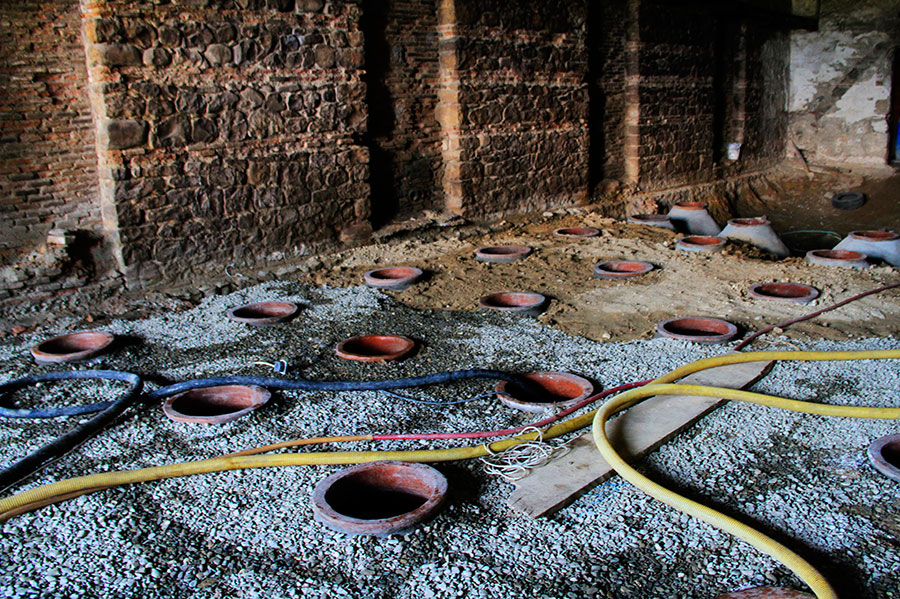
Kvevris being buried in a winery

Wine-makers who use kvevri claim that their wine is stable by nature, rich in tannins, and that it does not require chemical preservatives to ensure long life and superior taste. The tannins found in kvevri wine limit protein content and prevent turbidity.

Since the Russian market for Georgian wine has dwindled to a trickle, Georgia has revived this ancient method of wine-making and is exciting interest around the world. Various commercial wineries in Georgia export kvevri wines abroad, and some wine-makers in Europe and America have taken to making their wine in kvevris.

Kvevri and the tradition of wine-making in kvevri was inscribed on the Intangible Cultural Heritage of Georgia registry in 2011. In 2013, UNESCO added the traditional Georgian method of making wine in kvevris as qvevri wine to its list of worlds intangible cultural heritage.
