= Tvishi, Tsageri =

Tvishi ტვიში
- Interactive map of Tvishi
- Location within Georgia
- Coordinates: 42°30′55″N 42°47′36″E
- Country: Georgia
- Region: Racha-Lechkhumi and Kvemo Svaneti
- Municipality: Tsageri
- Elevation: 400 m (1,300 ft)

Population (2014)
  - Total: 205
- Time zone: UTC+4 (Georgian Time)

Tvishi (Georgian: ტვიში T’vishi) is a village in Tsageri Municipality, Racha-Lechkhumi and Kvemo Svaneti region, Georgia. It is located 33 km south of Tsageri, at an altitude of about 400 m. The population was 205 inhabitants in 2014.

Tvishi is known for the appellation wine of the same name.
