= Mtsvane =

Georgian grape variety

- Grape (Vitis)
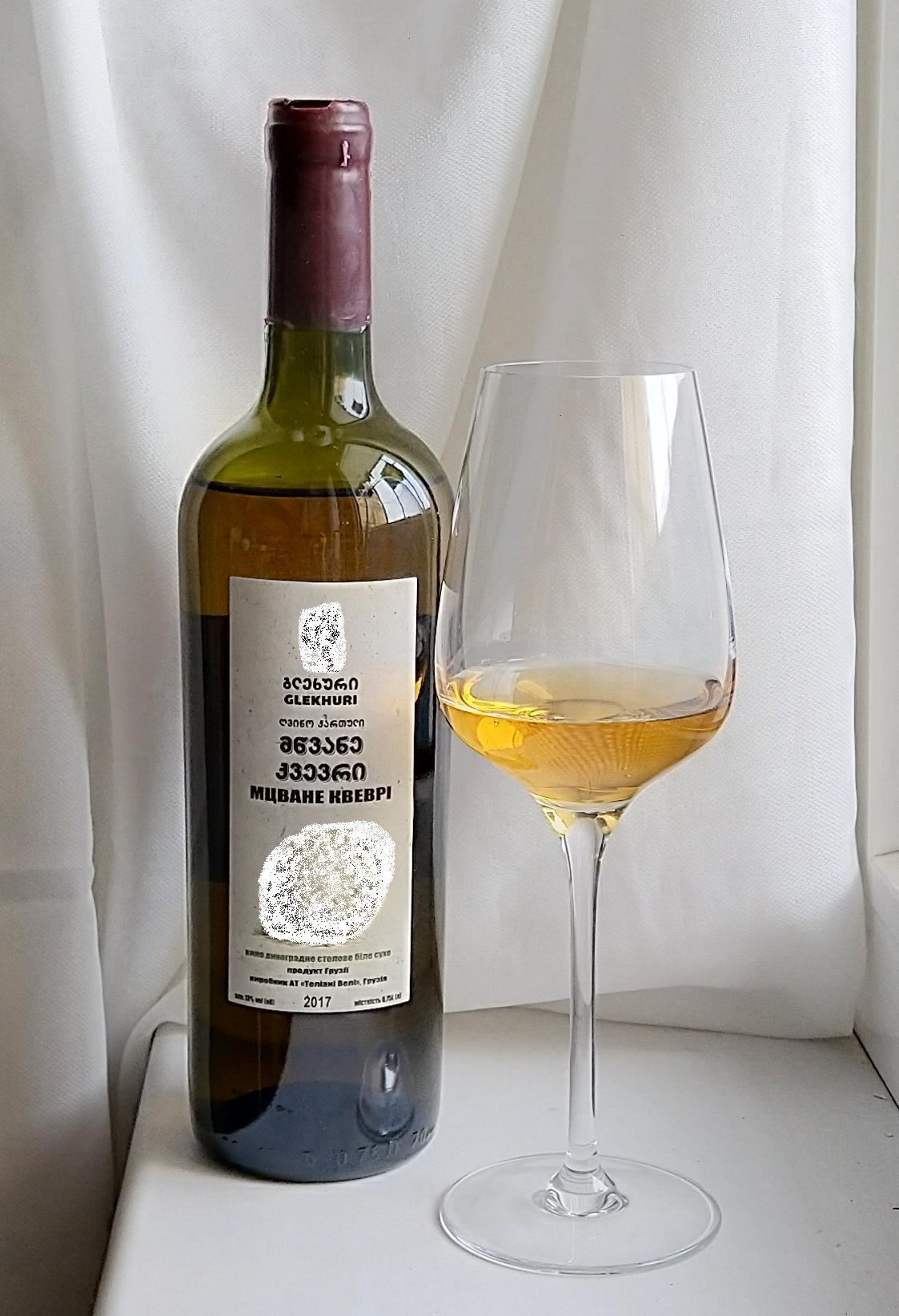
- Color of berry skin: White
- Species: Vitis vinifera
- Also called: See list of synonyms
- Origin: Georgia
- VIVC number: 8121

Mtsvane (Georgian: მწვანე, romanized: mts'vane) is a grape variety used to make Georgian wines. It is used to make white wine. It was so named to refer to the yellowish-green colouring of the ripened berries. It is often blended with Rkatsiteli to create a fruity, aromatic wine. In the Georgian language the word mtsvane means new, young and green.

== Synonyms ==
Mtsvane is also known under the synonyms Dedali Mtsvane, Dedali Mtzvane, Dedam Kourdzeni, Dedat Kourdzeni, Dedat Kurdzeni, Dedate Koudzeni, Mamali Mtsvane, Mamali Mtsvani, Mamali Mtzvane, Matsvane Kakhetinskii, Matsvani, Mchkhara, Mchknara, Mciknara, Mcvane Kachetinskij, Mcvane Kahetinski, Mtchknara, Mtsvane Kakhetinskii, Mtzvane Kachuri, Mtzvane Kakhetinsky, Mzibani, and Sapena.

The distinct Georgian grape varieties Kundza and Goruli Mtsvane may also be referred to as Mtsvane.

== See also ==
- Georgian wine
- List of Georgian wine appellations
