= Saperavi =

Variety of grape

- Grape (Vitis)
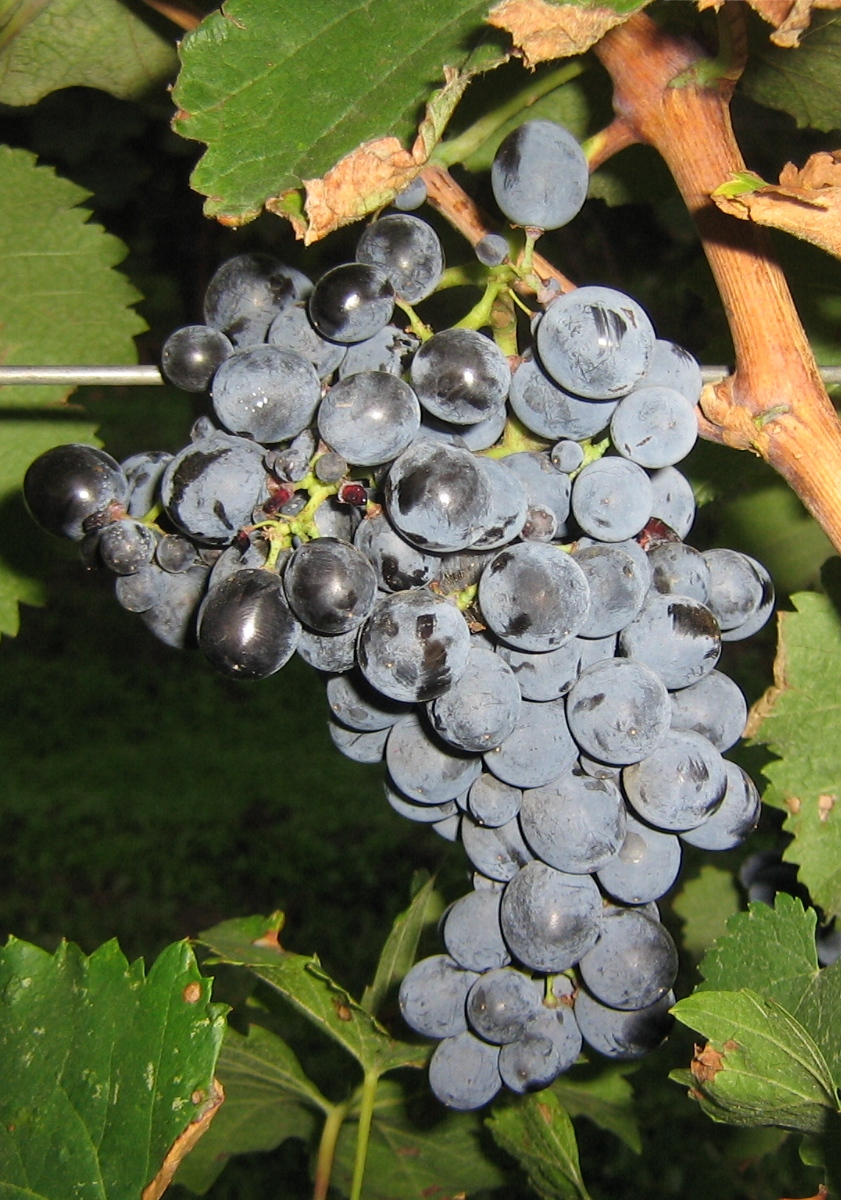
- Saperavi grapes
- Color of berry skin: Black
- Species: Vitis vinifera
- Also called: See list of synonyms
- Origin: Georgia
- VIVC number: 10708

Saperavi (Georgian: საფერავი; literally "paint, dye, give color") is an acidic, teinturier-type grape variety native to the country of Georgia, where it is used to make many of the region's best-known wines. Saperavi spread from Georgia to other parts of the Black Sea region and is considered an important variety in countries such as Moldova, Ukraine, and Bulgaria. In recent decades, it has also made its way as far as the United States and Australia, where it began to gain foothold in the 1990s.

Saperavi is also known under the synonyms Didi Saperavi, Kleinberiger, Nerki Khagog, Patara Saperavi, Saparavi, Sapeavi de Kakhetie, Saperaibi, Saperavi de Kachet, Saperavi de Kakhetie, Saperavi Patara, Sapeur, Sapperavi, Sapperavy, Scoperawi, and Szaperavi.

== Characteristics ==
The berries are medium to large, elliptic or round depending on the type, dark bluish, and thin-skinned; with a maturation period of approximately 5 months and moderate productivity. The leaves are 3-lobed, large, and roundish.

Saperavi produces an extractive wine with a characteristic bouquet, a harmonious taste, and pleasant astringency. Its alcoholic strength ranges from 10.5 to 12.5% and titrated acidity from 5 to 7%. Saperavi grapes produce very deep red wines that are suitable for extended aging. It has the potential to produce high alcohol levels, and is often blended with lighter varieties. It is by far the most dominant Georgian red grape in terms of overall production.

Saperavi is a hardy variety, known for its ability to handle extremely cold weather and is popular for growing in high altitude and inland regions such as Kakheti. It is a teinturier grape, containing the red anthocyanin within the grape pulp as well as the skin and is unusual in being one of very few such grapes used in single-varietal winemaking.

== Geography ==
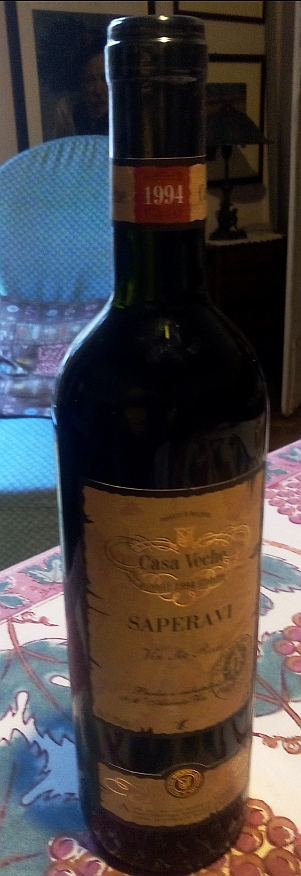
1994 Saperavi.

The Saperavi grape originated in the Kakheti region of Eastern Georgia and now is spread throughout its entire territory (Kakheti, Saingilo, Kartli, Shavshet-Klarjeti, Imereti, Guria, Racha and Lechkhumi). The Saperavi variety is one of the oldest cultivars from the region, and has consistently been the most important in Georgia's commercial winemaking industry.

Saperavi grapes are used predominantly in Georgia and Russia, but have spread to other regions of Eastern Europe more recently (e.g., Purcari in Moldova). Saperavi cultivars are also being grown in New World wine regions, notably in Finger Lakes and Niagara area vineyards. It has shown promising results for a few growers in Australia, where it was pioneered in the King Valley Region of northeast Victoria. The largest single Saperavi vineyard is likely the 400-hectare (990-acre) vineyard owned by Badagoni Winery in the Kakheti region of Georgia.

== Wines ==
Notable Georgian wines made exclusively or predominantly with Saperavi grapes:

- Kindzmarauli: a natural semi-sweet wine, aged for 2 years, produced in the Kvareli region. Grapes are harvested later than for most other wines made from Saperavi.
- Akhasheni: a semi-sweet wine similar to Kindzmarauli, produced in the Gurjaani region.
- Mukuzani: a dry wine, aged for 3 years, produced in the Mukuzani region. It is sourced from the best of the local vintages; and is considered one of the best of the Georgian wines.
- Napareuli: a dry wine, aged for 3 years, produced in the Napareuli microzone, Telavi region. It is sourced from the best of the local vintages; and is considered one of the best of the Georgian wines.
- Alazani: a light semi-sweet wine, produced in the Alazani region. A blend of 60% Saperavi and 40% Rkatsiteli. The warmer climate produces sweeter grapes than other regions.

== See also ==
- Georgian wine
- List of Georgian wine appellations
