= Tavkveri =

- Grape (Vitis)
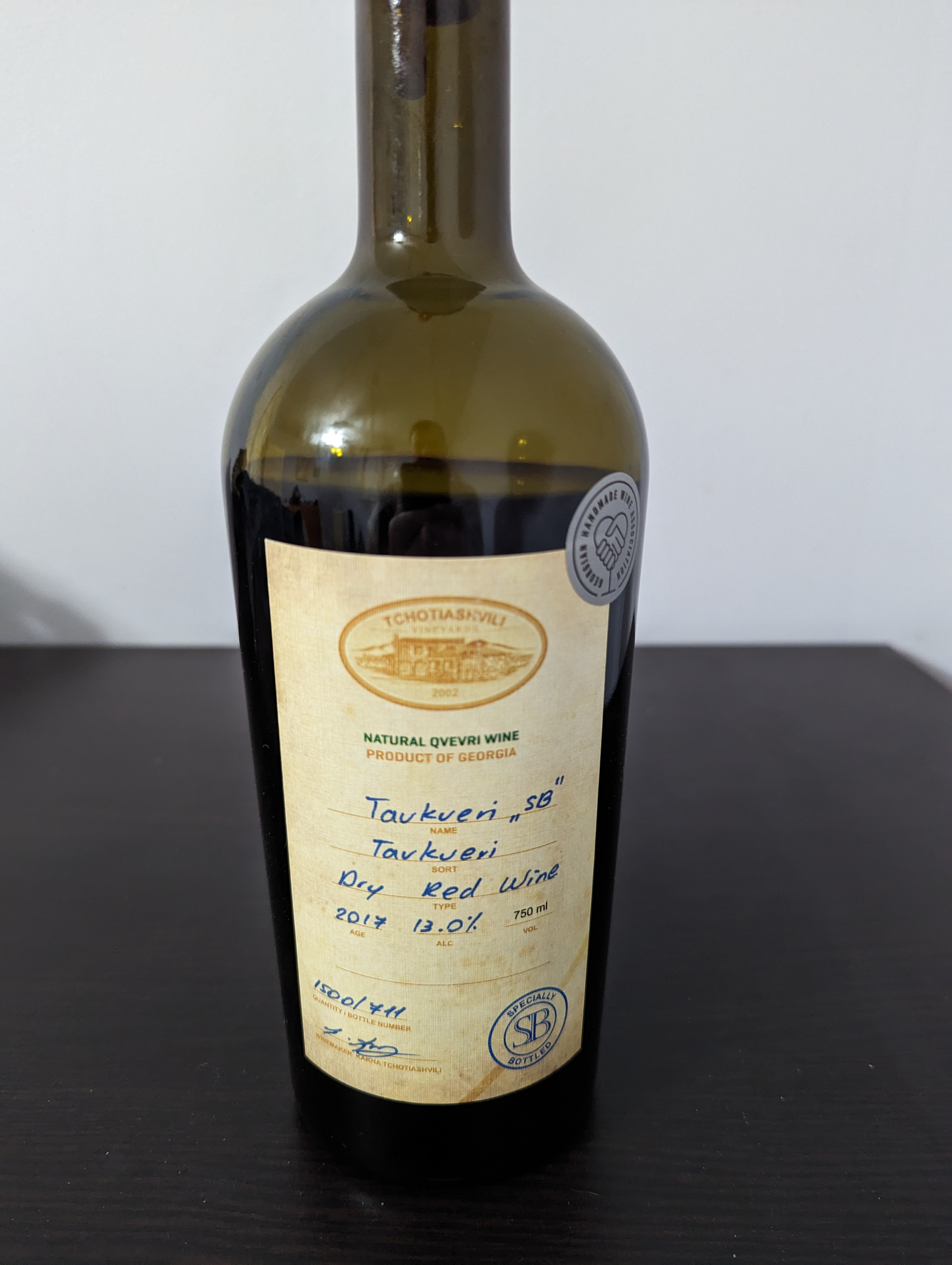
- Origin: Georgia
- Notable regions: Kartli, Kakheti
- Sex of flowers: female
- VIVC number: 12276

Tavkveri (Georgian: თავკვერი) is a red grape varietal native to Georgia that used as a table grape and to make a variety of wines. Tavkveri is indigenous to the Kartli region, but it is also widely cultivated in Kakheti, as well as in Azerbaijan.

== Characteristics ==
Due to the flat top of the berry the grape is nicknamed "hammerhead". As the flowers are female, Tavkveri must be planted in proximity to other grape varietals in order to be pollinated.

== Wines ==
Tavkveri is used in the production or red and rosé wines. It is the primary grape used for the production of red wines in Kartli.

== Synonyms ==
Takveri is also known as Didi Scaperawi, Grosser Scaperawi, Takweri, Takweri Rothblau, Tarkveri, Tavaveri, Tavkeri Kartalinsky, Tavkeri Kartlis, Tavkveri Didmartsvala, and Tvtveri.
