= List of Georgian wine appellations =

The following is a list of Georgian wine appellations. As of October 2026, 44 appellations are registered with Sakpatenti, Georgia's national intellectual property center. 18 are described in a book published in 2010, and the others have been added since (see current list here).

Appellation	Region	Municipality	Grape varieties	Color	Type
Akhasheni	Kakheti	Gurjaani	Saperavi	Red	Semi-sweet
Akhmeta	Kakheti	Akhmeta	Kakhuri Mtsvane	White	Dry
Asuretuli shala	Kartli	Asureti	Asuretuli Shavi, Takveri, Shavkapito	Red	Dry
Ateni, Atenuri	Shida Kartli	Gori	Chinuri, Goruli Mtsvane, Aligoté	White	Sparkling
Bolnisi	Kvemo Kartli	Bolnisi	Rkatsiteli, Chinuri, Goruli Mtsvane, Saperavi, Tavkveri, Shavkapito, Asuretuli Shavi	White, amber, rosé, red	Dry
Gurjaani	Kakheti	Gurjaani	Rkatsiteli, Kakhuri Mtsvane	White	Dry
Kakheti	Kakheti	-	Rkatsiteli, Kakhuri Mtsvane	White	Dry
Kardenakhi	Kakheti	Gurjaani	Rkatsiteli, Khikhvi, Mtsvane	White	Fortified
Khashmi Saperavi	Kakheti	Sagarejo	Saperavi	Red	Dry
Khvanchkara	Racha-Lechkhumi and Kvemo Svaneti	Ambrolauri	Aleksandrouli, Mujuretuli	Red	Semi-sweet
Kindzmarauli	Kakheti	Kvareli	Saperavi	Red	Semi-sweet
Kisi magrani	Kakheti		Kisi	White	Dry
Kotekhi	Kakheti	Gurjaani	Rkatsiteli, Saperavi	Red, White	Dry
Kvareli	Kakheti	Kvareli	Saperavi	Red	Dry
Manavi	Kakheti	Sagarejo	Kakhuri Mtsvane, Rkatsiteli	White	Dry
Mukuzani	Kakheti	Gurjaani	Saperavi	Red	Dry
Napareuli	Kakheti	Telavi	Rkatsiteli, Saperavi	Red	Dry
Okami	Kartli	Kaspi	Shavkapito, Chinuri, Goruli Mtsvane	Red, White	Dry
Okureshis Usakhelouri	Racha-Lechkhumi	-	Usakhelouri	Red	Dry, semi-sweet
Salkhino Ojaleshi	Samegrelo	-	Ojaleshi	Red	Dry
Sviri	Imereti	Zestaponi	Tsolikouri, Tsitska, Krakhuna	White	Dry
Teliani	Kakheti	Telavi	Cabernet Sauvignon	Red	Dry
Tibaani	Kakheti	Sighnaghi	Rkatsiteli	White	Dry
Tsarapi	Kakheti	-	Rkatsiteli	White	Dry
Tsinandali	Kakheti	Telavi	Rkatsiteli, Kakhuri Mtsvane	White	Dry
Tvishi	Racha-Lechkhumi and Kvemo Svaneti	Tsageri	Tsolikouri	White	Semi-sweet
Vazisubani	Kakheti	Gurjaani	Rkatsiteli, Kakhuri Mtsvane	White	Dry
Zegaani	Kakheti	Zegaani	Saperavi	Red	Dry
