= Sardinian wine =

Regional Italian wine

Sardinia
- Wine region
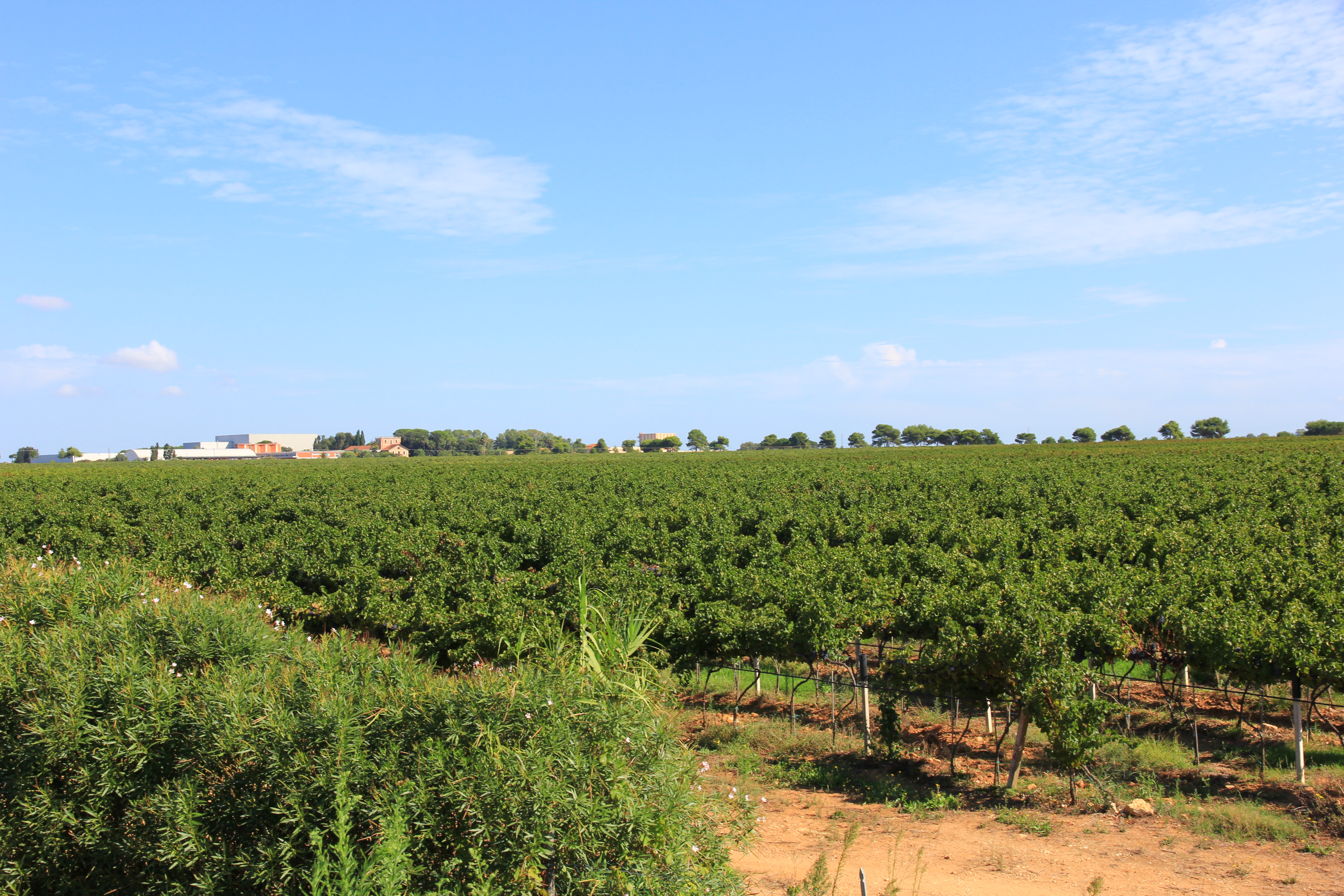
- Type: Italian wine
- Year established: 1967
- Years of wine industry: 1967–present
- Country: Italy
- Soil conditions: Granite, limestone, clay, sand
- Grapes produced: 55% white varieties, 40% red varieties
- Varietals produced: Red: Cannonau, Carignano, Monica, Bovale, Nieddera, Malvasia Nera; White: Vermentino, Nuragus, Moscato Bianco, Malvasia, Semidano, Torbolino
- Official designations: 1 DOCG: Cannonau di Sardegna; 15+ DOCs including Vermentino di Gallura, Carignano del Sulcis, Malvasia di Bosa; Several IGTs including Isola dei Nuraghi

Sardinian wine is Italian wine produced on the island of Sardinia.. Sardinia is the sixteenth Italian region for wine production.

Location of Sardinia wine region in Italy

== Grape varieties ==
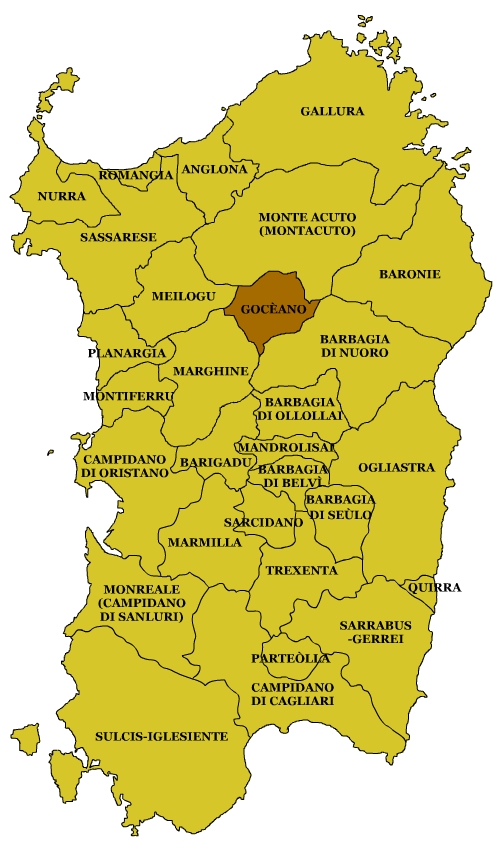
Goceano is the zone of Arvesiniadu grape variety

- Albaranzeuli bianco
- Albaranzeuli nero
- Arvesiniadu
- Barbera Sarda
- Bovale
- Cannonau (Grenache)
- Girò
- Greco nero
- Malvasia
- Monica
- Moscato
- Nasco
- Nuragus
- Pascale di Cagliari
- Vermentino
- Vernaccia di Oristano

== DOC/G zones ==
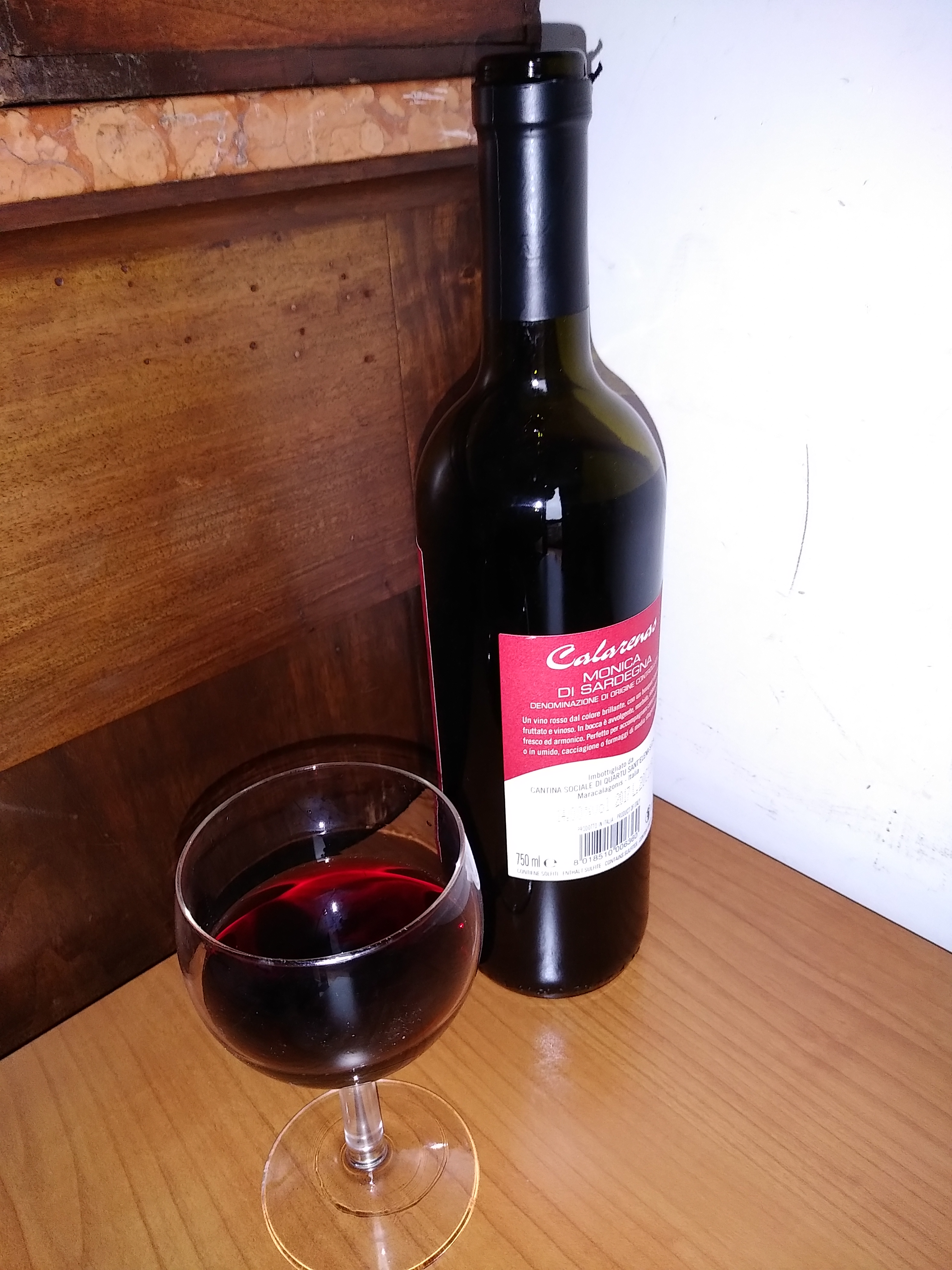
Monica di Sardegna

- Alghero, produced in the province of Sassari.
- Arborea, produced in the province of Oristano.
- Campidano di Terralba, produced in the provinces of Cagliari and Oristano.
- Cannonau di Sardegna, produced throughout the island.
- Carignano del Sulcis, produced in the province of Cagliari.
- Girò di Cagliari, produced in the provinces of Cagliari and Oristano.
- Malvasia di Bosa, produced in the province of Nuoro.
- Malvasia di Cagliari, produced in the provinces of Cagliari and Oristano.
- Mandrolisai, produced in the provinces of Nuoro and Oristano.
- Monica di Cagliari, produced in the provinces of Cagliari and Oristano.
- Monica di Sardegna, produced throughout the island.
- Moscato di Cagliari, produced in the provinces of Cagliari and Oristano.
- Moscato di Sardegna, produced throughout the island.
- Moscato di Sorso Sennori, produced in the province of Sassari.
- Nasco di Cagliari, produced in the provinces of Cagliari and Oristano.
- Nuragus di Cagliari, produced in the provinces of Cagliari, Nuoro and Oristano.
- Sardegna Semidano, produced throughout the island.
- Vermentino di Gallura DOCG, produced in the provinces of Nuoro and Sassari.
- Vermentino di Sardegna, produced throughout the island.
- Vernaccia di Oristano, produced in the province of Oristano.

== IGT zones ==
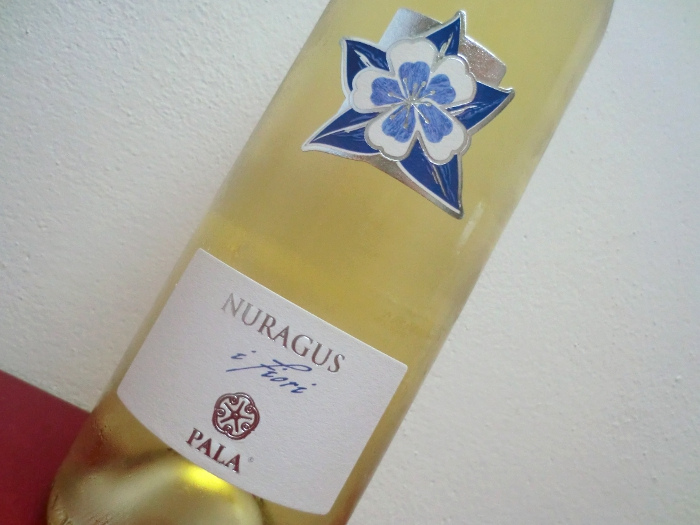
A Nuragus wine from Sardinia.

- Barbagia, produced in the province of Nuoro.
- Colli del Limbara, produced in the provinces of Sassari, Olbia-Tempio and Nuoro.
- Isola dei Nuraghi. produced throughout the region of Sardegna
- Marmilla, produced in the provinces of Cagliari and Oristano.
- Nurra, produced in the province of Sassari.
- Ogliastra, produced in the provinces of Cagliari and Nuoro.
- Parteolla, produced in the province of Cagliari.
- Planargia, produced in the provinces of Nuoro and Oristano.
- Provincia di Nuoro, produced in the province of Nuoro.
- Romangia, produced in the province of Sassari.
- Sibiola, produced in the province of Cagliari.
- Tharros, produced in the province of Oristano.
- Trexenta, produced in the province of Cagliari.
- Valle del Tirso, produced in the province of Oristano.
- Valli di Porto Pino, produced in the province of Cagliari.
