= Mallorca (Vino de la Tierra) =

Mallorca VdlT
- Wine region
- Mallorca VdlT in the region of the Balearic Islands
- Type: Vino de la Tierra
- Country: Spain

VdlT wine regions of the Balearic Islands

Mallorca is a Spanish geographical indication for Vino de la Tierra wines located in the island of Mallorca in the autonomous region of the Balearic Islands, Spain. Vino de la Tierra is one step below the mainstream Denominación de Origen indication on the Spanish wine quality ladder.

It acquired its Vino de la Tierra status in 2007.

== Grape varieties ==
- Red: Callet, Manto negro, Cabernet sauvignon, Fogoneu, Merlot, Monastrell, Syrah, Tempranillo and Pinot noir
- White: Prensal or Moll, Chardonnay, Macabeo, Malvasía, Moscatel de Alejandría, Moscatel de grano menudo, Parellada, Riesling and Sauvignon blanc
