= Binissalem (DOP) =

Coordinates: 39.6844°N 2.8468°E

Binissalem DOP
- Wine region
- Binissalem DOP in the region of Balearic Islands
- Official name: D.O.P. Binissalem
- Type: Denominación de Origen Protegida (DOP)
- Year established: 1990
- Country: Spain
- No. of vineyards: 605 hectares (1,495 acres)
- No. of wineries: 11
- Comments: Data for 2016 / 2017

Binissalem is a Spanish Denominación de Origen Protegida (DOP) (Denominació d'Origen Protegida in Catalan) for wines located around the town of Binissalem in the centre of the island of Mallorca, Balearic Islands, Spain.

== History ==
Grape growing and wine production was introduced to the island by the ancient Romans in the year 121 BC when Quintus Caecilius Metellus Pius took possession of the island for Rome. Pliny the Elder mentioned the wines of Mallorca in his writings in the 1st century AD.

During the centuries of Moorish dominion, grape growing and wine production did not disappear despite the prohibitions of the Koran, as when king Jaume I conquered the island in 1230, he was offered top quality wine as a peace offering.

Before the arrival of the phylloxera plague at the end of the 19th century there were about 27,000 ha under vines in Mallorca and exports were 300,000 hl of wine per year. After the devastation of the virus however, most of the vineyards were replaced by almond trees. In the late 20th century there was a revival of the wine industry due to the demand for quality wine by tourists.

It acquired its DO status in 1991, the first of the two Mallorcan DOPs to do so, the other being Plà i Llevant.

== Geography ==
The area covered by the DOP in the centre of the island, northeast of the town of Palma and is a high plateaux of rolling hills at altitudes of between 125 m and 300 m above sea level. To the north is the Sierra de Alfabia range which protects the vineyards from the cold and wet sea winds that blow during the winter.

== Soils ==
The soils are loose and poor in nutrients, with lime over clay and occasional layers of hard lime crusts, which contributes to water retention.

== Climate ==
The climate is maritime Mediterranean, with warm hot summers and short mild winters. Excessive heat in the summer is the main problem that the grape growers have to cope with, though the altitude helps to keep down temperatures during the night. There are occasional risks of strong winds, frosts and hailstones. Rainfall is mainly in the autumn in the form of violent storms.

== Authorised Grape Varieties ==
The authorised grape varieties are:

- Red: Manto Negro, Callet, Tempranillo, Syrah, Monastrell, Cabernet Sauvignon, Merlot, Gorgollassa, and Giró Ros
- White: Prensal Blanc, Macabeo, Parellada, Moscatel de Alejandría, Moscatel de Grano Menudo, and Chardonnay
