= Forastera (disambiguation) =

Forastera is the primary name or synonym of several wine and table grape varieties including:

- Forastera, grown on the islands of Ischia and Procida in the Campania region of southern Italy
- Forastera (Spanish grape), grown in the Canary Islands
- Chelva, Spanish grape that is also known as Forastera blanca and Mantuo grown in the Extremadura region
- Doradilla, Spanish grape that is also known as Forastera blanca that is grown in the Malaga region of Andalucia
