= Vernaccia (disambiguation) =

Vernaccia is the name of several or synonym of Italian wine grape varieties including:

- Vernaccia, the white Tuscan grape used in the DOCG wine of Vernaccia di San Gimignano
- Vernaccia, another name for Bianchetta Trevigiana that is a crossing of Durella and Brambana
- Vernaccia, another name for Tintora that is a crossing of Aglianico and Gerusalemme
- Vernaccia di Oristano, a white grape grown on the island of Sardinia
- Vernaccia Trentina, also known as Vernaccia bianca, a virtually extinct variety that was once grown in the Trentino region
- Vernaccia di Pergola, another name for the Aleatico grape in southern Italy
- Vernaccia nera di Valdarno, a grape that is believed to be an offspring of Sangiovese
- Vernaccia nera, another name for the Grenache grape in Marche and Umbria
