= Albanella (grape) =

Variety of grape

Albanella is a white Italian wine grape variety that is grown in the Marche region where it is a primary component in the white Denominazione di Origine Controllata (DOC) wines of Colli Pesaresi. The grape is often confused with the similarly named Sicilian wine grape Albanello and was long thought to be identical to the Tuscan wine grape Trebbiano but has established through DNA analysis to be its own distinct variety.

== History and relationship to other grapes ==
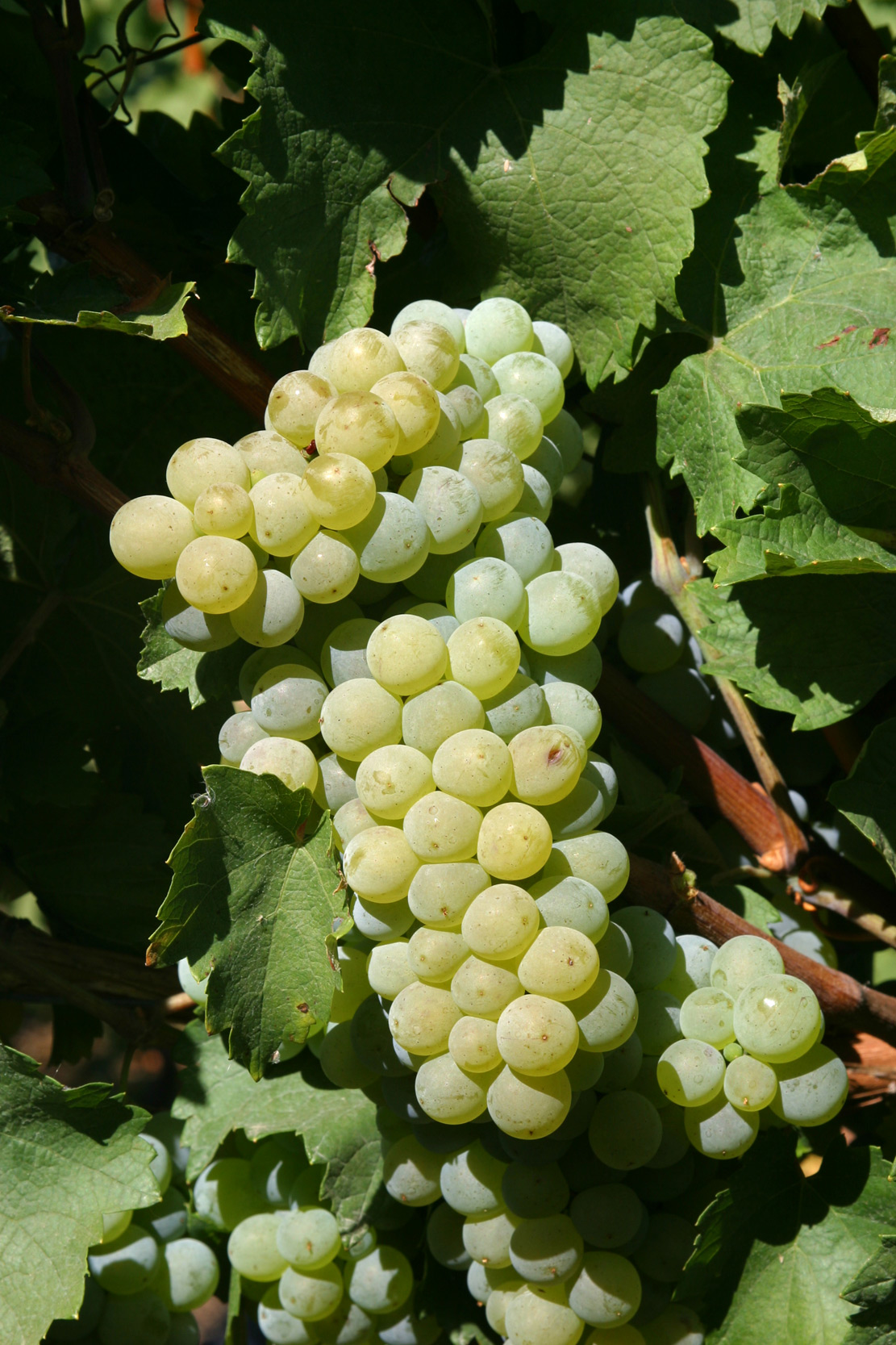
DNA evidence suggest that Albanella may potentially be related to the German wine grape Elbling (pictured)

While long thought to be a clone of Trebbiano, Albanella has also been confused with the southern Italian grape Greco bianco and the Sicilian grape Albanello. In recent years, DNA testing has determined that Albanella is its own distinct variety with possible close genetic relationship to the Sardinian wine grape Albaranzeuli bianco and the German wine grape Elbling.

== Wine regions ==
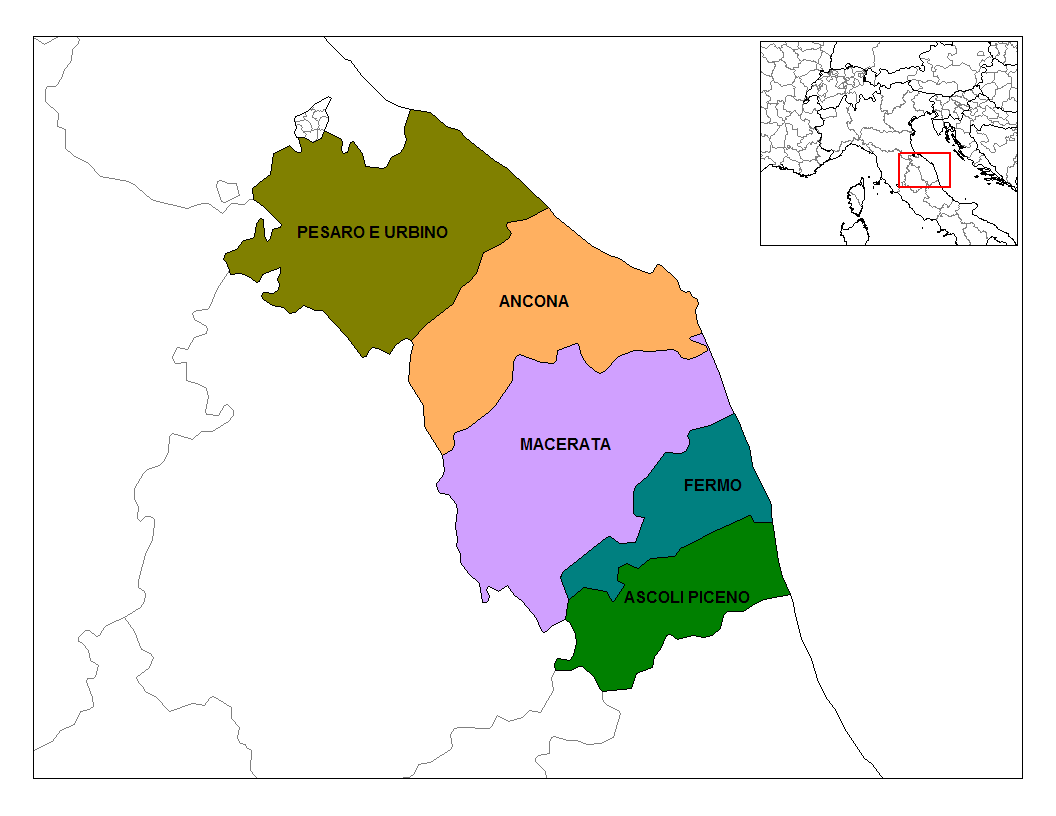
Today Albanella is almost exclusively grown in the northern province of Pesaro in the Marche region.

While once widely planted throughout the Marche, today Albanella is almost exclusively grown in the province of Pesaro where it is the main component in the white wines of the Colli Pesaresi DOC. Here the grape can be blended with Trebbiano, Verdicchio, Biancame, Pinot gris, Pinot noir, Riesling Italico, Chardonnay, Sauvignon blanc and Pinot blanc.

== Wine styles ==
According to Master of Wine Jancis Robinson, Albanella tends to produce dry white wines that have notable aging potential.

== Synonyms ==
According to the Vitis International Variety Catalogue (VIVC), there are no officially recognized synonyms of Albanella.
