= Pascale di Cagliari =

Variety of grape

Pascale di Cagliari is a red Italian wine grape variety that is grown in Sardinia.

== DOC wines ==
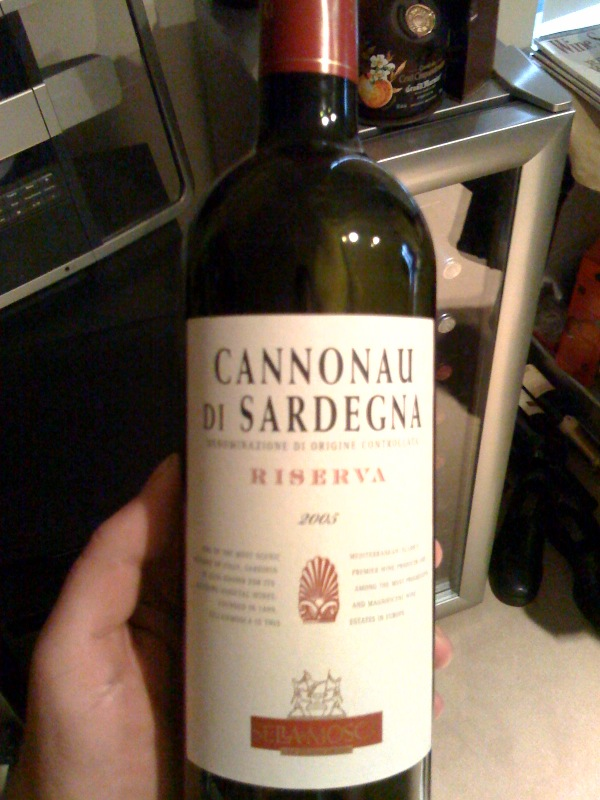
Pascale di Cagliari is a minor component permitted in the DOC wines of Cannonau di Sardegna.

Pascale di Cagliari is a permitted grape variety in several Denominazione di origine controllata wines in Sardinia including the Alghero DOC located in the northwest corner of island. Here it is used to make both red and rosé wines blended with Cabernet Sauvignon, Cabernet Franc and Carmenere. Pascale di Cagliari grapes destined for DOC wine production must be harvested to a yield no greater than 12 tonnes/hectare with the finished wines needing to attain a minimum alcohol level of at least 10%.

When grown on the plains of Campidano on the island's west coast it blended with Bovale di Spagna, Bovale Sardo, Monica and Greco in the red wines of the Campidano di Terralba DOC. The grapes are limited to a harvest yield of 15 tonnes/ha with the wines needing a minimum of five months aging in oak or the bottle prior to release with a minimum alcohol level of 11.5%.

In the red and rose wines of the Cannonau di Sardegna DOC, Pascale di Cagliari plays a minor role to Grenache (known as Cannonau in Sardina) which must make up at least 90% of the blend. Here Pascale di Cagliari is permitted to make up the remaining 10% in a blend along with Carignan, Vernaccia di San Gimignano, the Bovale varieties and Monica. The variety is grown throughout the Oliena, Nepentedi, Jerzu and Capo Ferrato sub-zones of the DOC with grapes limited to a harvest yield of 13.2 tonnes/ha. The finished wines must attain a minimum alcohol level of 12.5% with special Riserva bottlings needing to attain an alcohol levels of 13% with at least two years of aging prior to release. An additional Superiore bottling can also be made with an alcohol level of at least 15% and at least two years of aging.

Pascale di Cagliari is also grown in southwest Sardinia in the Sulcis region and on the island of Carloforte where it plays a supporting role in the Carignan del Sulcis DOC. In the reds and roses of this region, Carignan is the primary grape constituting at least 85% of the blend with Pascale di Cagliari permitted to fill in the remainder along with Alicante Bouschet and Monica. In order to be used for the DOC wines Pascale di Cagliari must be harvested to yields no greater than 16 tonnes/ha, be aged with the wine at least 5 months and attain a minimum alcohol level of 11.5%. Wines labeled as Invecchiato are aged at least 11 months while riserva bottlings are aged at least two years, one year of which must be spent in oak and at least 6 months in bottle, with a finished alcohol of 12.5%. Superiore bottlings have similar aging requirements but the wine must attain a minimum alcohol level of 13%.

== Synonyms ==
Over the years Pascale di Cagliari has been known under a variety of synonyms including Barberone, Bovale, Buonamico, Giacomino, Nera Tomentosa, Pascale, Pascali, Pascali di Cagliari, Pasquale di Cagliari, Picciolo Rosso and Primidivu Nieddu.
