= Manto negro =

Variety of grape

- Grape (Vitis)
- Color of berry skin: Noir
- Species: Vitis vinifera
- Also called: see list of synonyms
- Origin: Spain
- Notable regions: Balearic Islands
- VIVC number: 7348

Manto negro is a red Spanish wine grape variety grown on the Balearic Islands. It is used in wines produced under the Binissalem-Mallorca and Plà i Llevant (DO) Denominación de Origen (DO)s, as well as the Illes Balears appellations. Today, Manto negro is almost exclusively found on the island of Majorca with 320 hectares (790 acres), making it the most widely planted grape variety on the island. It represents over 20% of the total vineyard land in production. Although planted throughout the island, the vine seems to be more successful in the rocky soils of the western Binissalem region.

== History and relationship to other grapes ==
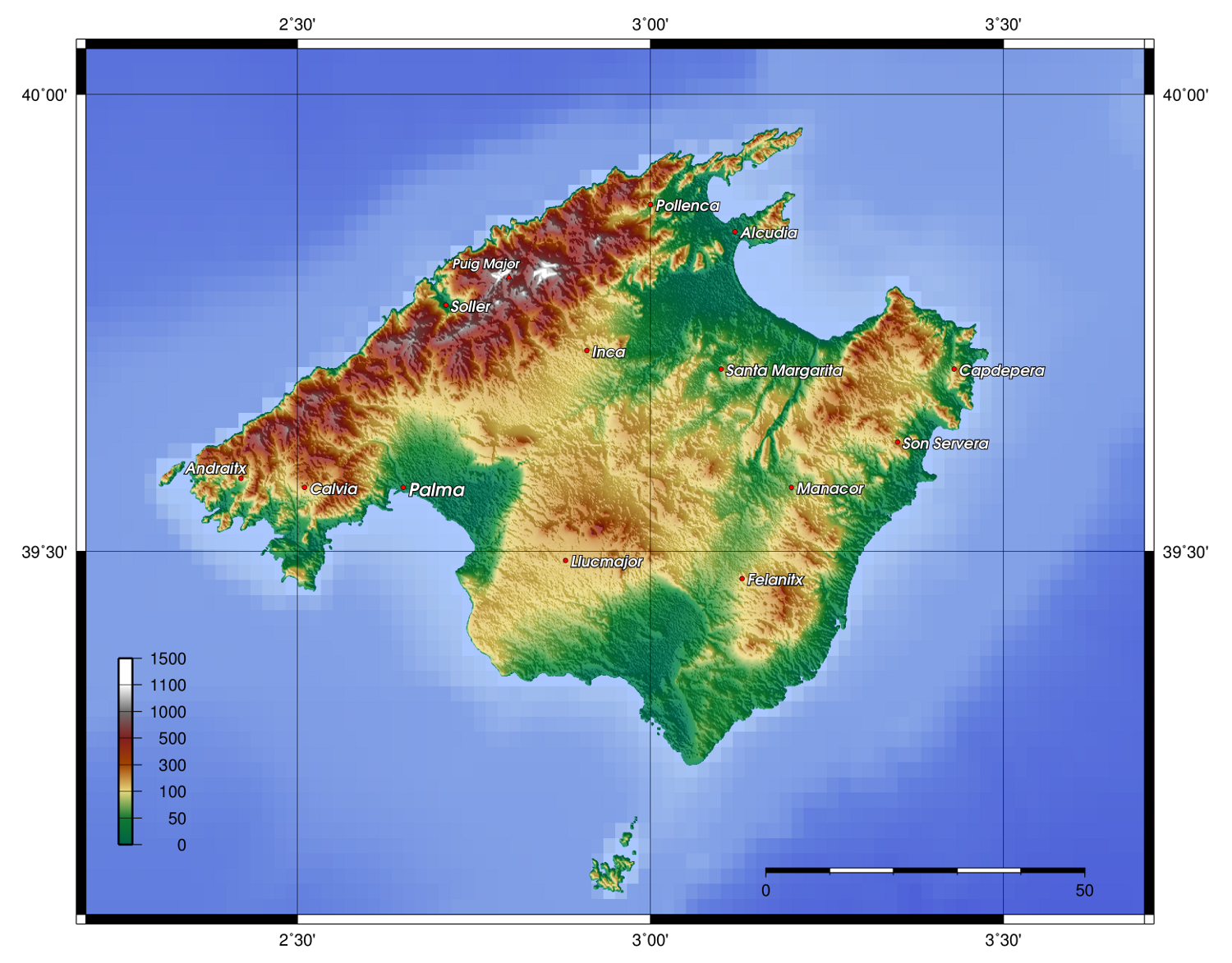
The island of Mallorca where ampelographers believe that Manto negro originated.

Ampelographers believe that Manto negro is indigenous to Mallorca with DNA profiling suggesting that the grape is a natural crossing of two virtually extinct Balearic grapes, Sabaté and Callet Cas Concos which would make the grape a half-sibling to Callet (itself a cross of Callet Cas Concos and Fogoneu). Additionally, Callet Cas Concos is believed to be a natural crossing of the Sardinian wine grape Girò and the Spanish wine grape Beba which would make Manto negro a grandchild to these varieties.

Despite sharing the synonym Mantuo, the grape is not a color mutation nor does it have any known relationship with the white Spanish wine grape Chelva which is known as Mantúo in Extremadura.

== Viticulture ==
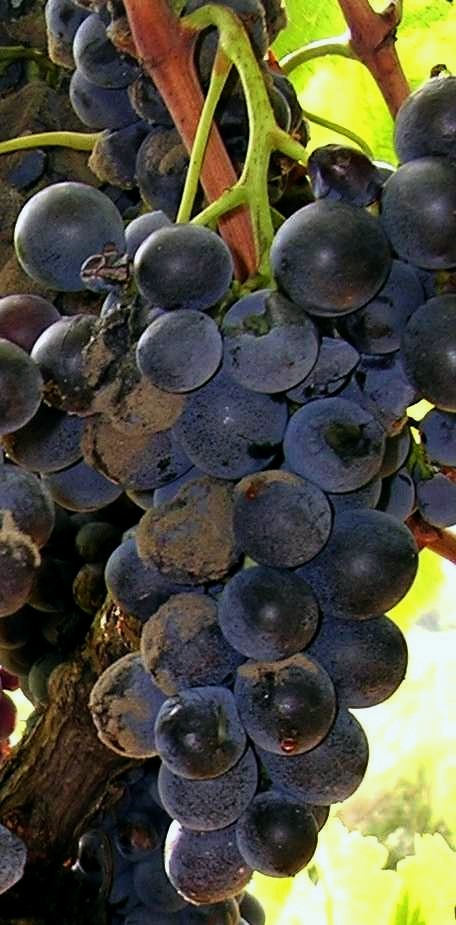
While Manto negro has good resistance to many other viticultural hazards, the wine is very susceptible to developing botrytis bunch rot (example pictured) which is often undesirable in red wine grapes.

Manto negro is a late-ripening grape variety that buds early in the growing season and produces average size clusters of large, thick-skinned grapes. The vine often does not go through veraison completely with some berries on a cluster never getting darker than a pale pink shade. In rich and fertile soils the variety can be very productive and high yielding with the vine performing best in stony vineyard soils. While the grape has some resistance to downy and powdery mildew, it is very susceptible to the viticultural hazards of botrytis bunch rot.

== Wines ==
According to Master of Wine Jancis Robinson, Manto negro tends to produce lightly colored, soft, light bodied red wines that are often high in alcohol. In Mallorca, the grape is often blended with lower-alcohol and more structured varieties such as Callet though in DOs such as Binissalem-Mallorca, Manto negro still must account for at least 30% of the final wine blend.

The age of the vine has a distinct influence on the resulting flavor profile and quality of the wines produced by Manto negro with younger vines tending to produce lighter, more red-fruit flavors while older vines (which also tends to naturally produce lower yields) more often produced more concentrated dark fruit flavors.

During winemaking, Manto negro responds well to oak treatment but can be prone to oxidation. Wines made from the grape are often meant to be consumed young and not intended for long cellar aging.

== Synonyms ==
Over the years, Manto negro has been known under a variety of synonyms including: Cabelis, Cabellis, Mantonegro, Mantuo negro.
