= Vino Greco =

Style name of Roman imitation of Greek wines

Vino Greco is the name of a wine style which originated, at least 2,150 years ago, as an Italian imitation of the sweet, strong Greek wines that were exported to Italy at the period of the Roman Republic and Roman Empire. Its names in other languages were: Latin vinum graecum; English Greek, greke, wine greke; French vin grec. The earliest recipe for vinum Graecum is in Cato the Elder's manual of farming, De agri cultura, compiled around 150 BC. Salt is added to the must. Once sealed in amphoras, vinum graecum is matured under the sun for two years before sale. Incidentally, the name did not necessarily cause confusion with real exported Greek wine, which was called vinum transmarinum ("overseas wine") in classical Latin. Methods have changed totally over the long history of vino greco, but the name still survives in a few Italian wines, notably the sweet white Greco di Bianco and Greco di Gerace from southern Calabria (they can be produced in Reggio Calabria area).

== Middles Ages to modern day ==
Vino greco reappears in late medieval and early modern texts from Italy, France, Catalonia, Germany and England. Curiously, the 14th century Florentine merchant Francesco Pegolotti records in Pratica della mercatura (c. 1340) that vino greco was exported from Italy to Constantinople, the Byzantine Greek capital. Again, there was not necessarily any confusion, since wine exported from Greece was at that period usually called vino di Romania (Rumney wine in English).

The Italian gastronome Platina, in De honesta voluptate et valetudine (1475), says that the best vino greco was made at San Gimignano (Non improbatur et graecum, maxime vero quod in oppidum Geminianum in Hetruria nascitur), but he is careful to distinguish it from the still-famous Vernaccia di San Gimignano. Vino greco or wine Greek is described by several authors as being made on the slopes of Mount Vesuvius; one such traveller is the scientist John Ray, writing in 1673. Ray distinguishes this Greco from another Vesuvian type, Lagrime, which is evidently the wine now called Lacryma Christi.

== See also ==
- Ancient Greece and wine
