= Greco (grape) =

Variety of grape

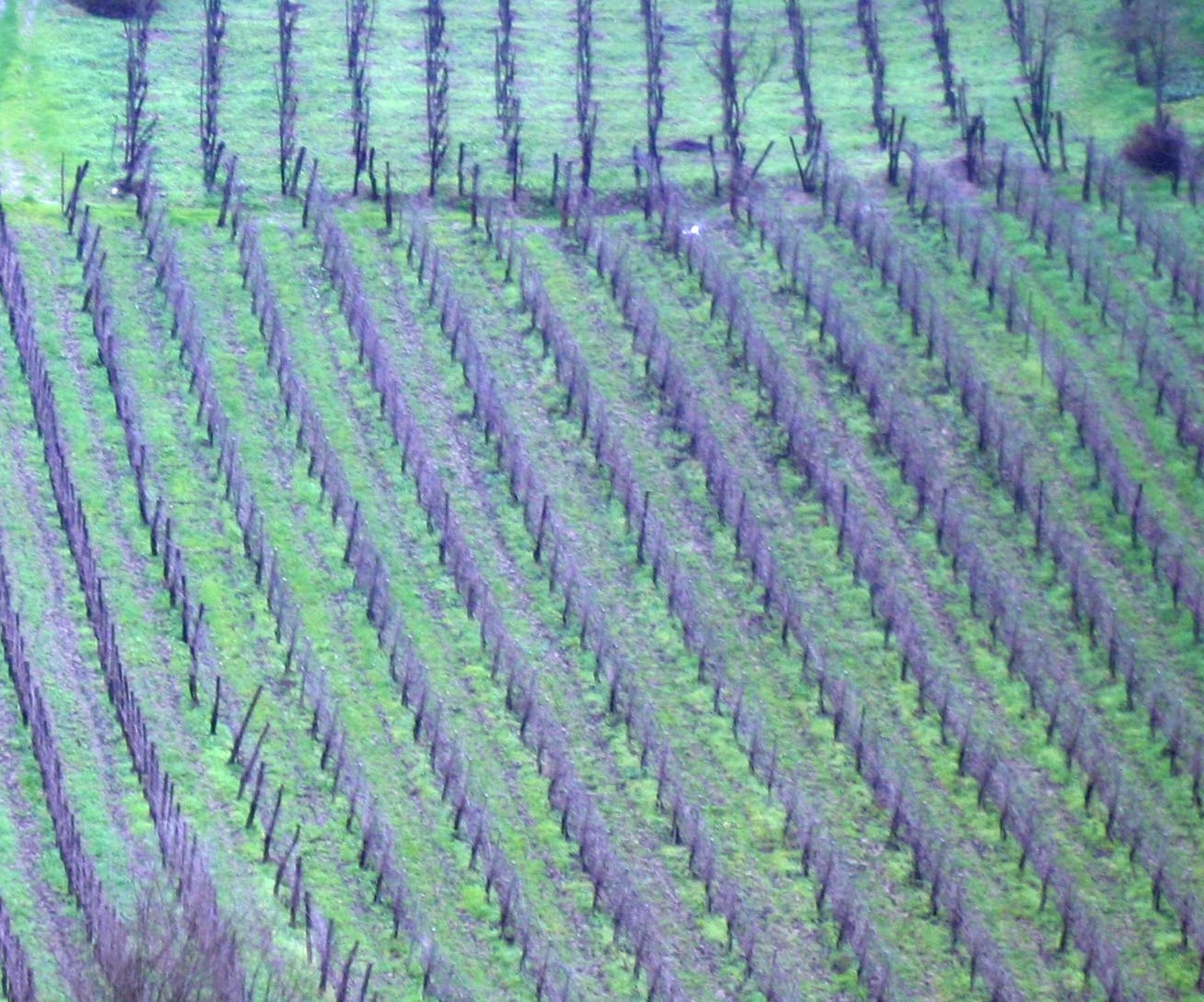

Greco is an Italian wine grape that may be of Greek origin. The name relates to both white (Greco bianco) and black (Greco nero) grape varieties. While there is more land area dedicated to Greco nero, the Greco bianco is the grape most commonly referred to by "Greco". In the Campania region it is used to produce the denominazione di origine controllata e garantita (DOCG) wine Greco di Tufo. In Calabria, it is used to make the denominazione di origine controllata (DOC) wine Greco di Bianco. The name "Greco" is sometimes used as a synonym for several varieties of supposed Greek origins-most notably Trebbiano.

== History ==
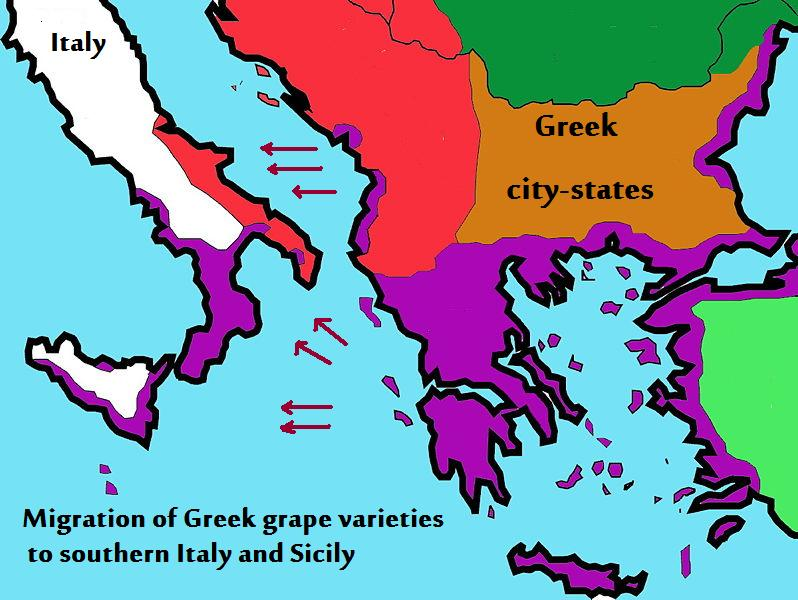
During the Greek colonization of southern Italy, Greek settlers brought with them new grape varieties, perhaps including the ancestor vine of Greco.

The ancestor of the Greco vine may have been brought to southern Italy more than 2,500 years ago by ancient Greek settlers. Historians and Italian growers have speculated that the grape may have been a blending component in the ancient Roman "cult wines" of Falernian and Aminean. As the grape vine has propagated throughout Italy, the name "Greco" has been ascribed to several varieties that may have historically been linked to Greece. Ampelographers disagree about whether Greco is a single variety with several clones or an agglomeration of several varieties under the umbrella name of "Greco". There is also disagreement about whether any of the Italian so-called "Greek vines" are currently being cultivated in Greece.

After World War II, the fate of Greco as well as that of many southern Italian grape varieties were in peril. The wartime devastation of vineyards as well as the mass migration of Italian vine growers from agriculture to urban industries in the cities and abroad, ushered in a period of general decline for viticulture in the region. As plantings declined and vineyards were ripped up, many varieties were on the verge of extinction. The efforts of family winemakers and heritage winemaking projects such as the Villa of the Mysteries project headed by Piero Mastroberardino, helped sustain the existence of the Greco vine in southern Italy.

=== Recent discoveries ===
In the early 21st century, DNA profiling confirmed that some plantings in Italy described as "Greco" are genetically identical to the grape variety Asprinio.

== Greco bianco ==
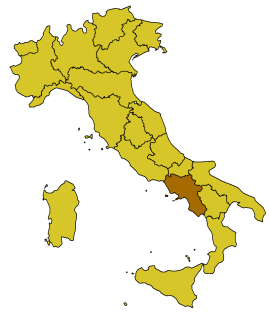
The Campania region of Italy, where the Greco di Tufo DOCG is produced

The Greco bianco vine tends to mature very late in the grapevine's growing season and is prone to the viticultural hazards of downy and powdery mildew. Ampelographers distinguish the vine based on its characteristic "winged" clusters. After veraison the grapes turn a golden-grey color. The phenolic compounds in the grape contribute to the wine's characteristically deep color. Greco bianco wines are noted for their aromatic qualities with some wine experts, such as Jancis Robinson, describing the wines as being vaguely similar to Viognier. Some aromas commonly associated with the grape include peaches and fresh green foliage. With age, Greco wines can develop more herbal notes.

Greco bianco is most widely found in southern Italy where it is featured in several DOC. In 2006, it numbered less than 1,000 hectares (2,500 acres) of the varieties planted. In Calabria, a specific clone of Greco bianco is used to produce the sweet dessert wine Greco di Bianco, made in a partial passito style from grapes that have been partially dried after harvest. On the island of Capri, Greco is usually blended with Biancolella and Falanghina to produce dry-style wines. In Apulia, it is a permitted blend component in the Gravina DOC. In Campania, it is featured in the DOCG wine of Greco di Tufo produced around the town of Tufo, Provincia di Avellino. It is also permitted in Lacryma Christi produced on the slopes of Mount Vesuvius.

=== DOCG regions ===
There are two DOCG regions that Greco plays a primary role in; however, the grape variety is a permitted component in several DOCs in southern Italy. The Greco di Tufo DOCG region of Campania is located north of the Fiano di Avellino DOCG and includes the town of Tufo and seven other hillside communities. The region was elevated to a DOCG in 2003. Despite being a third of the size of the Fiano di Avellino DOCG, Greco di Tufo is the Campania region's largest producer of DOC quality wine. The vineyard soils of the region are derived from tuff, a rock formed from volcanic ash—after which the town of Tufo itself is named. All DOCG wines from the region must contain at least 85% Greco with Coda di Volpe usually filling in the remaining blend. According to Master of Wine Mary Ewing-Mulligan, Greco di Tufo wines are usually ready to drink 3–4 years after harvest and have the aging potential to continue to develop well for 10–12 years. A sparkling spumante style is also permitted.

The Greco di Bianco DOC region of Calabria is located around the city of Bianco in the "toe" of Italy on the Ionian coast. This is a dessert-style wine made from partially dried grapes that must maintain a minimum alcohol level of 17%. The wine has a characteristically dark amber color with aromas of citrus and herbal notes. Harvest yields are restricted to a maximum of 10 tonnes per hectare. According to wine expert Peter Saunders, Greco di Bianco is often described as one of the best Italian dessert wines produced in the country.

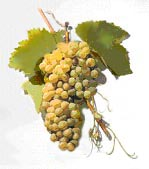
Greco is often blended with Malvasia (pictured).

Other DOCs that are permitted to use Greco bianco include:

- Bivongi DOC – Calabrian wine region located along the Stilaro river on the slopes of Mount Consolino. For the white wine of Bivongi, Greco can make up to 30–50% of the blend along with Guardavalle, Montonico, Malvasia bianca and Ansonica.
- Capri DOC – Campanian wine region located on the island of Capri. Greco is permitted to make up to 50% of the white blend along with Falanghina and Biancolella.
- Cilento DOC – Campanian wine region located in Cilento of the province of Salerno. Greco is permitted to make 10–15% of the white blend along with Fiano, Trebbiano and Malvasia Bianca.
- Ciro DOC – Calabrian wine region located in the province of Catanzaro. Greco can be used as a small component (no more than 5%) in the red wine blend of Ciro along with Trebbiano in this predominately Gaglioppo wine. The inclusion of the white grapes in this red shares some of the purpose and history behind the inclusion of white wine grapes in the red wines of Chianti.
- Fiano di Avellino DOCG – Campanian wine region recently promoted to DOCG in 2003. Greco is permitted to make up 15% of this blend along with Fiano, Trebbiano and Coda di Volpe.
- Gravina DOC – Apulian wine region located around the town of Gravina. Greco is permitted to make up to 35–60% of the blend along with Malvasia, Bianco d'Alessano, Bombino bianco, Trebbiano and Verdeca.
- Melissa DOC – Calabrian DOC around the city of Melissa. The region names is derived from the Greek word for "sweet" which is used to describe the high level of ripe sugars that wine grapes can achieve in this wine climate region. Both Greco nero and Greco bianco are permitted in the red wine of this DOC from 5–25%. In the white blend, Greco makes up 80–05% along with Trebbiano and Malvasia bianca.
- Molise DOC – This large DOC covers the entire mountainous Molise region located south of Abruzzi. The region attained DOC status in 1998 and is one of the few Italian regions that are permitted to have varietally labeled wines of which Greco bianco is permitted provided it is responsible for at least 85% of the wine.
- Penisola Sorrentina DOC – Campanian wine region based on the Sorrento Peninsula. Greco is permitted to make up to 60% of the white blend of this DOC along with Falanghina and Biancolella.
- Sannio DOC – Campanian wine region located in the hill center of the region that overlaps partially with the historical grape-growing region of Samnium. Here Greco is used for both still wines and a spumante style wine produced with the classical method of sparkling wine production. For the still white blend of Sannio, Greco is permitted to make up to 50% of the blend with Trebbiano, Coda di Volpe, Falanghina, Fiano and Moscato. In the spumante style, Greco and Falanghina are the only two permitted grape varieties.
- Sant'Agata dei Goti DOC – Campanian wine region located around the town of Sant'Agata de' Goti. Greco is permitted to make up to 40–60% of the blend along with Falanghina.
- Sant'Anna di Isola Capo Rizzuto DOC – Calabrian wine region located on a cape in the heel of Italy. The white Greco bianco is permitted to make up to 35% of the blend for the red wine of this DOC.
- Scavigna DOC – Calabrian wine region located in the province of Catanzaro near the Falerna DOC where historically the Roman wine Falernian was produced. Greco is permitted to make up to 20% of the blend along with Trebbiano, Chardonnay and Malvasia.

== Greco nero ==
Provinces of Calabria in the "toe" of Italy. It is where most of the Greco nero variety is planted.

The red wine variety of Greco, Greco nero, is the most widely planted Greco variety in Italy with an estimated 3,200 hectares (7,900 acres) planted. Most Greco nero is found in the Calabria region where it is often blended with Gaglioppo.

Among the DOCs that are permitted to use Greco nero:

- Bivongi DOC – for both the red and rosé wines of Bivongi, Greco is permitted to make 30–50% of the blend along with Gaglioppo, Nocera, Nero d'Avola and Castiglione.
- Campidano di Terralba DOC – Sardinian wine region located on the plains of Campidano on the island's west coast. Greco is permitted to make up to 20% of the blend along with Bovale di Spagna, Bovale Sardo, Pascale di Cagliari and Monica.
- Donnici DOC – Calabrian wine region located around the city of Cosenza. Greco is permitted to make up to 10–20% of the blend along with Gaglioppo, Malvasia bianca and Pecorello.
- Lamezia DOC – Calabrian wine region located around the city of Lamezia Terme. Greco is permitted to make up to 25–25% of the blend along with Nerello Mascalese, Nerello Capuccio and Gaglioppo.
- Melissa DOC – for the red blend of this wine, Greco is permitted to make up to 5–25% of the wine along with Gaglioppo and white grape varieties of Greco bianco, Trebbiano and Malvasia bianca.
- Pollino DOC – Calabrian wine region that is the southernmost wine-producing region on Calabria located in the foothills around Monte Pollino. Greco is permitted to make up to 40% of the blend along with Gaglioppo, and the white grape varieties of Malvasia Bianca, Montonico bianco and Guarnaccia bianca.

== Synonyms ==
Among the synonyms that have been associated with both white and black varieties of Greco are Balsamina Bianca, Biancame, Greco Biondello, Greco Castellano, Greco delle Torre, Greco del Vesuvio, Greco di Gerace, Greco di Napoli, Greco di Tufo, Greco Maceratino, Greco Moneccio, Grecula, Grecu Niuru, Grieco, Gieco, Grecau, Montecchiese, Morbidella, Ragusano Bianco, Sambiase, and Verdicchio near??.

== See also ==
- Vino Greco
