= Forastera =

Variety of grape

Forastera is a white Italian wine grape variety that is grown on the islands of Ischia and Procida off the coast of Naples in Campania. In the early 21st century, DNA analysis confirmed that the Spanish wine grape variety of the same name grown in the Canary Islands is a completely different and distinct variety with no close genetic relationship to the Italian Forastera.

== History ==
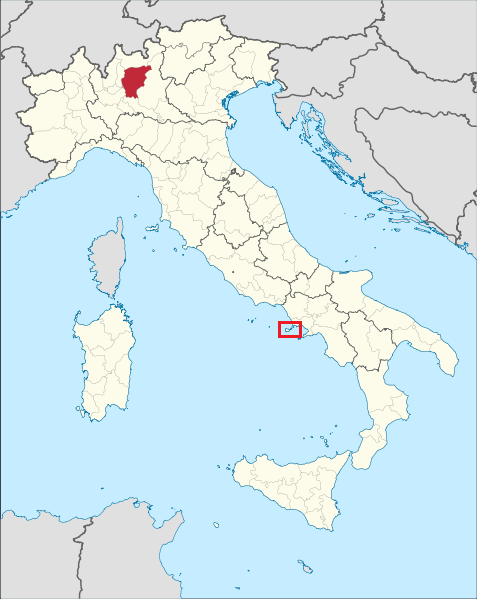
While Forastera has had a long history of cultivation in the Campanian islands of Ischia and Procida (outlined in red box), the grape may have originated in the Lombardy province of Bergamo (highlighted).

Ampelographers believe that the name Forastera is derived from the Italian word forestiero which means "foreign" and could be an indication that the grape didn't originate on the Campanian islands. However, the first recorded mention of the grape was on the island of Ischia in the 1877 writings of winemaker Giuseppe Rovasenda, the Conti di Rovasenda whose ancestors served in the court of the Dukes of Savoy. Additional late 19th century writings from ampelographer Giuseppe Froio also described the grape growing in Ischia.

Rovasenda also noted back in 1877 that Forastera was also being cultivated in the province of Bergamo in Lombardy around the town of Grumello del Monte though the grape is no longer grown there today though this accounts hints that the "foreign" grape may have a northern Italian origin.

It was once thought the Campanian Forastera was at some point brought to the Canary Islands where the a white Forastera grape is still grown and permitted for us in several Denominación de Origen (DO) wines but DNA evidence in the early 21st century showed that the Italian and Spanish varieties are distinct and not closely related.

== Viticulture ==
Forastera is an early to mid-ripening grape variety that is noted for being very vigorous and prone to producing a large canopy that may need to be kept in check by pruning and canopy management techniques.

== Wine regions ==
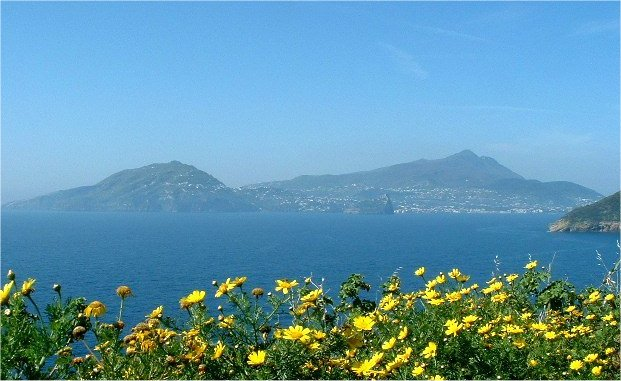
A view of the island of Ischia from the island of Procida where Forastera is grown.

In 2000, there were 102 hectares (250 acres) of Forastera growing in Italy, almost exclusively on the islands of Ischia and Procida. The grape is primarily found in the Denominazione di origine controllata (DOC) wines of Ischia where it is often blended with Biancolella and other local varieties such as Arilla and San Lunardo. The grape is also permitted in some of the DOC wines of Sardinia though it is rarely found there.

== Styles ==
According to Master of Wine Jancis Robinson, as a varietal, Forastera tends to produce light-bodied and easy drinking wines in both a still and sparkling style that are characterized by fresh fruit flavors.

== Synonyms ==
Over the years, Forastera has been known under a variety of synonyms including: Ferestiera, Forastera blanca, Forastiera, Forestera, Forestiera, Forestiero, Frastera, Furastera, Furastiera and Uva dell'Isola (on the island of Procida).
