= Pla i Llevant (DO) =

Coordinates: 39°28′17.2″N 2°8′36.4″E

Pla i Llevant DOP
- Wine region
- Pla i Llevant DOP in the region of Balearic Islands
- Official name: D.O.P. Pla i Llevant
- Type: Denominación de Origen Protegida (DOP)
- Year established: 2001
- Country: Spain
- No. of vineyards: 439 hectares (1,085 acres)
- No. of wineries: 13
- Wine produced: 15,189 hectolitres
- Comments: Data for 2016 / 2017

Pla i Llevant is a Spanish Denominación de Origen Protegida (DOP) (Denominació d'Origen Protegida in Catalan) for wines located on the island of Mallorca, Balearic Islands, Spain. The name in the Catalan or Mallorcan language means "plain and east coast."

== History ==
Grape growing and wine production was introduced to the island by the ancient Romans in the year 121 BC when Quintus Caecilius Metellus Pius took possession of the island for Rome. Pliny the Elder mentioned the wines of Mallorca in his writings in the 1st century AD.

During the centuries of Moorish dominion, grape growing and wine production did not disappear despite the prohibitions of the Koran, as when King James I conquered the island in 1230, he was offered top quality wine as a peace offering.

Before the arrival of the phylloxera plague at the end of the 19th century, there were about 27,000 hectares (67,000 acres) under vines in Mallorca and exports were 300,000 hl (8,000,000 gallons) of wine per year. After the devastation of the virus however, most of the vineyards were replaced by almond trees. In the late 20th century, there was a revival of the wine industry due to the demand for quality wine by tourists.

In 1991 the area was classified as Vinos de la Tierra, and, in 2001, 250 hectares (620 acres) were upgraded to DO status.

== Geography ==
The vineyards are located in the areas of Felanitx and Manacor, which cover the central and eastern part of the island.

They lie at a relatively low altitude, around 100 m (330 ft) above sea level.

== Soils ==
The soils are quite fertile, have a high clay and limestone content and are on lime-bearing rocks (marl and dolomite). The drainage is good and allows deep penetration of the roots. The soils are generally either red in colour due to the presence of iron oxide, or white due to the clays, calcium carbonate and magnesium.

== Climate ==
The climate is maritime Mediterranean, with long dry hot summers and short mild winters. In winter a strong wind is characteristic, especially on the plains, while there is not much risk of frosts or fog.

The average annual rainfall is 425 mm (16.7 in), falling mainly in autumn is the form of violent storms.

== Authorised grape varieties ==
The authorised grape varieties are:

- Red: Cabernet Sauvignon, Callet, Fogoneu, Manto Negro, Merlot, Monastrell, Pinot Noir, Syrah, Tempranillo, and Gorgollassa
- White: Chardonnay, Macabeo, Moscatel de Alejandría, Moscatel de Grano Menudo, Parellada, Prensal Blanc, Riesling, Giró Ros, and Viognier

The older vines are usually planted as low bushes (en vaso) whereas the newly planted vines are usually on trellises (en espaldera). The planting density is between 2,500 and 5,000 vines/ha (1,000 to 2,000 vines/acre).
