= Illes Balears (Vino de la Tierra) =

Illes Balears VdlT
- Wine region
- Illes Balears VdlT in the region of the Balearic Islands
- Type: Vino de la Tierra
- Country: Spain

VdlT wine regions of the Balearic Islands

Illes Balears is a Spanish geographical indication for Vino de la Tierra wines located in the autonomous region of the Balearic Islands, Spain. Vino de la Tierra is one step below the mainstream Denominación de Origen indication on the Spanish wine quality ladder.

The area covered by this geographical indication comprises all the municipalities of the Balearic Islands. There are currently about 300 hectares of vineyards and 37 wineries (bodegas) registered with the Regulatory Council.

It acquired its Vino de la Tierra status in 2003.

== History ==
The Romans were the first to import the vineyard and develop its cultivation in the Balearic Islands. As early as the 1st century BC, Pliny the Elder spoke of Balearic wines by comparing them with the best wines in Italy.

During the Arab domination, and in spite of the Koranic prohibitions, the cultivation of the vine that continued to be cultivated did not disappear, even with the sophisticated irrigation systems invented by the Arabs. Proof of this was that the Arab Beni Abet offered King James I, when he conquered the island in 1229, grapes of excellent quality. In the fourteenth century, the king and the chapter of the cathedral had their own wineries in Inca, and during the fifteenth and sixteenth centuries the cultivation of the vineyard employed almost all the inhabitants of Inca and its surroundings.

During the eighteenth century the vineyard enjoyed a period of prosperity, going from a production of 88,000 hl in 1777 to 335,331 hl in 1802. Between 1830 and 1834 there was a sharp decline due to the difficult economic conditions and the aphid plague.

== Grape varieties ==
- White: Moll, Chardonnay, Giró blanc, Macabeo, Malvasía, Moscatel de Alejandria, Moscatel de Grano Menudo, Parellada, Riesling and Sauvignon blanc
- Red: Callet, Manto negro, Fogoneu, Monastrell, Cabernet Sauvignon, Merlot, Syrah, Tempranillo and Pinot noir
