= Arilla =

Variety of grape

Arilla is a white Italian wine grape variety that is grown on the island of Ischia in the Tyrrhenian Sea near the Gulf of Naples. However, despite being exclusively found on the island, ampelographers believe that the grape may have actually originated in Sicily.

Today, Arilla is noted for its very high yields of grapes that produces relatively neutral tasting wine that is often blended with other local Italian grape varieties such as Biancolella, Forastera and San Lunardo.

== History ==
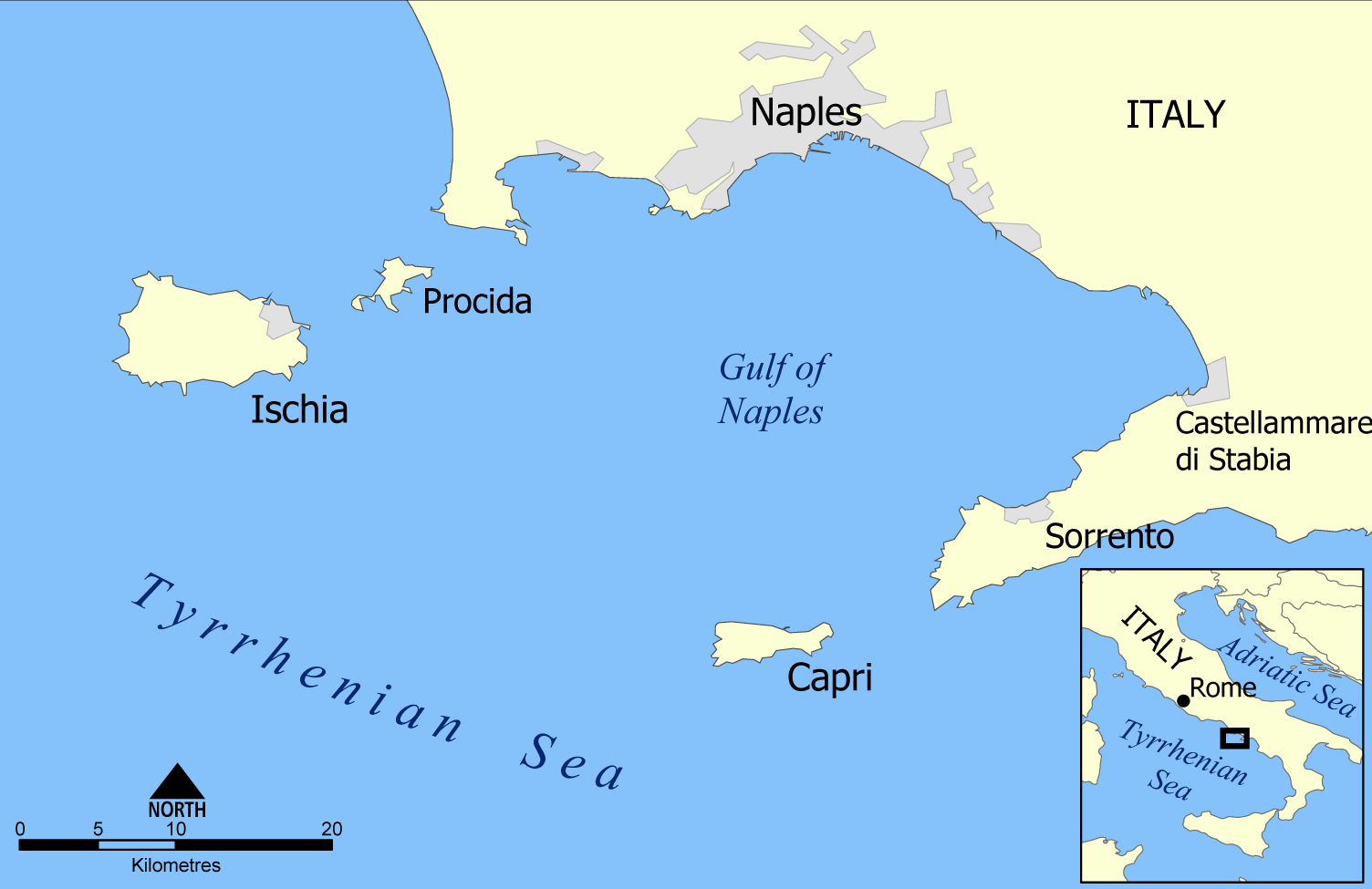
The island of Ischia at the north end of the Gulf of Naples where Arilla is grown.

Though Arilla has a long history of production on the island of Ischia, near the city of Naples, ampelographers believe that the grape is not actually native to Ischia or Campania but rather originated on the island of Sicily.

== Viticulture ==
Arilla thrives on the volcanic vineyard soils of the south-facing slopes of the island of Ischia. Here the grape is noted for its very prodigious yields, often producing a harvest upwards of 10 kilograms (22 lb) of grapes per vine.

== Wine regions ==
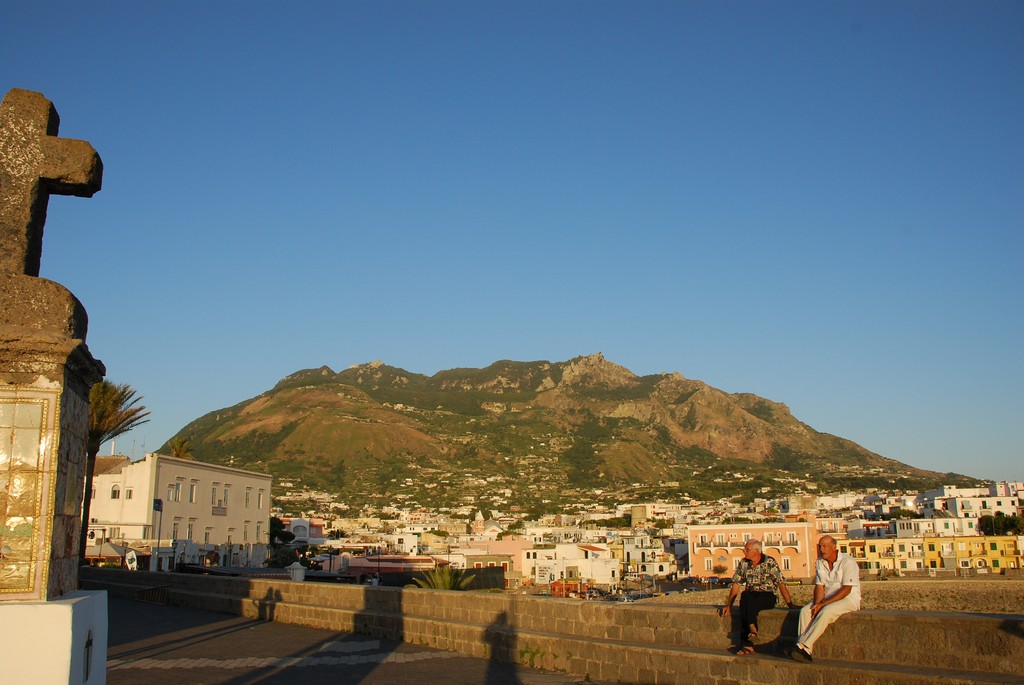
In the volcanic soils left over from the dormant volcano Mount Epomeo (pictured), the Arilla vine thrives and is able to produce very sizable yields.

Today, the grape is found almost exclusively on the island of Ischia where it produces relatively neutral wines that are often blended with other local grape varieties including Biancolella, Forastera and San Lunardo.

== Synonyms ==
Over the years, Arilla has been known under a variety of synonyms including: Agrilla, Arillo, Rille and Uva Rilla.
