= Vernaccia di Oristano =

Variety of grape

Vernaccia di Oristano is a white Italian wine grape variety grown on the island of Sardinia which makes a wide range of wine styles for the Denominazione di origine controllata (DOC) of Vernaccia di Oristano based in the province of Oristano. This includes both dry and sweet wines as well as fortified "sherry-like" wines aged in a solera. The grape has a long history on the island of Sardinia with Sardinians claiming that consuming ample quantities of wine produced from the grape as being responsible for low instances of malaria on the island.

Despite the similarities in their names and synonyms, Vernaccia di Oristano is a distinct variety that is not related to the Tuscan wine grape Vernaccia used to make Vernaccia di San Gimignano. The grape also does not appear to be related to the red wine grapes Aleatico or Grenache which are known as Vernaccia in different parts of Italy.

== History and name ==
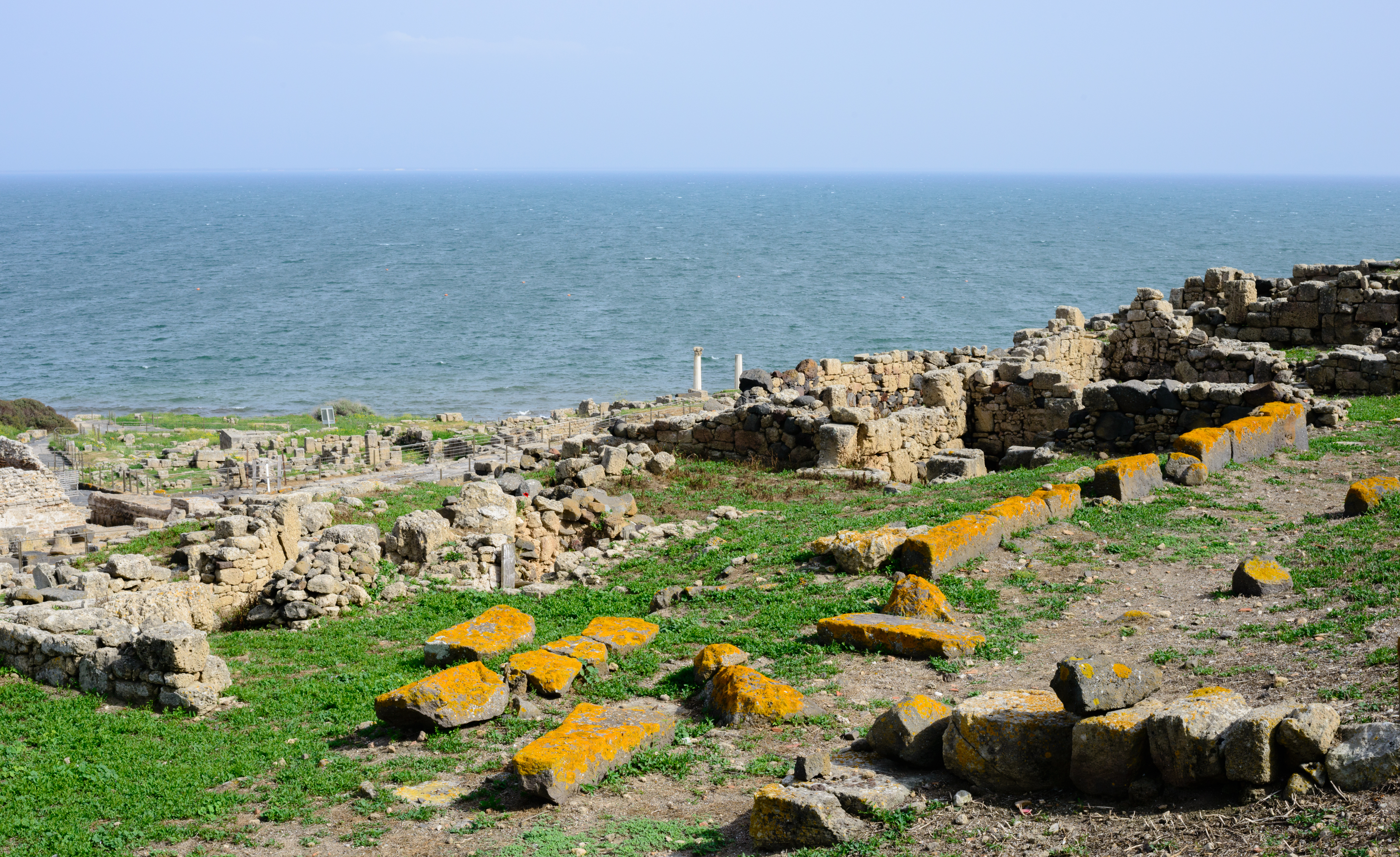
According to legend, the ancient Phoenicians introduced Vernaccia di Oristano to the island of Sardinia sometime after they founded the port of Tharros on the west coast of the island (ruins pictured).

This wine, discovered in Sardinia, is one of the oldest vine in the western Mediterranean. Seeds of Vernaccia and Malvasia dating back to approximately three thousand years ago were found in the well that served as a 'refrigerator' in a nuraghe near Cabras. The carbon 14 test carried out by the Biodiversity Conservation Center of the University of Cagliari confirms the dating and suggests that vine cultivation on the island has been known since the Bronze Age. The first documented mentioning of Vernaccia di Oristano was from a legal document drafted in 1327 in the town of Iglesias in southwest Sardinian that specified that winemakers were limited to producing one barrel each of wine made from several different grape varieties, including Vernaccia, Greco, Brusco bianco and Vermiglio, but that each wine was to be kept separate.

There are several theories behind the origins of the name Vernaccia that is shared by Vernaccia di Oristano and several other Italian varieties. The most common theory is that name is derived from the Latin word vernaculus (also the root of the word "vernacular") which means "native" or "indigenous" and would be attached to any grape perceived to be native to the local region. In the case of Vernaccia di Oristano, ampelographers believe that the grape may be native to the Tirso river valley that crosses the island of Sardinia before emptying into the Gulf of Oristano.

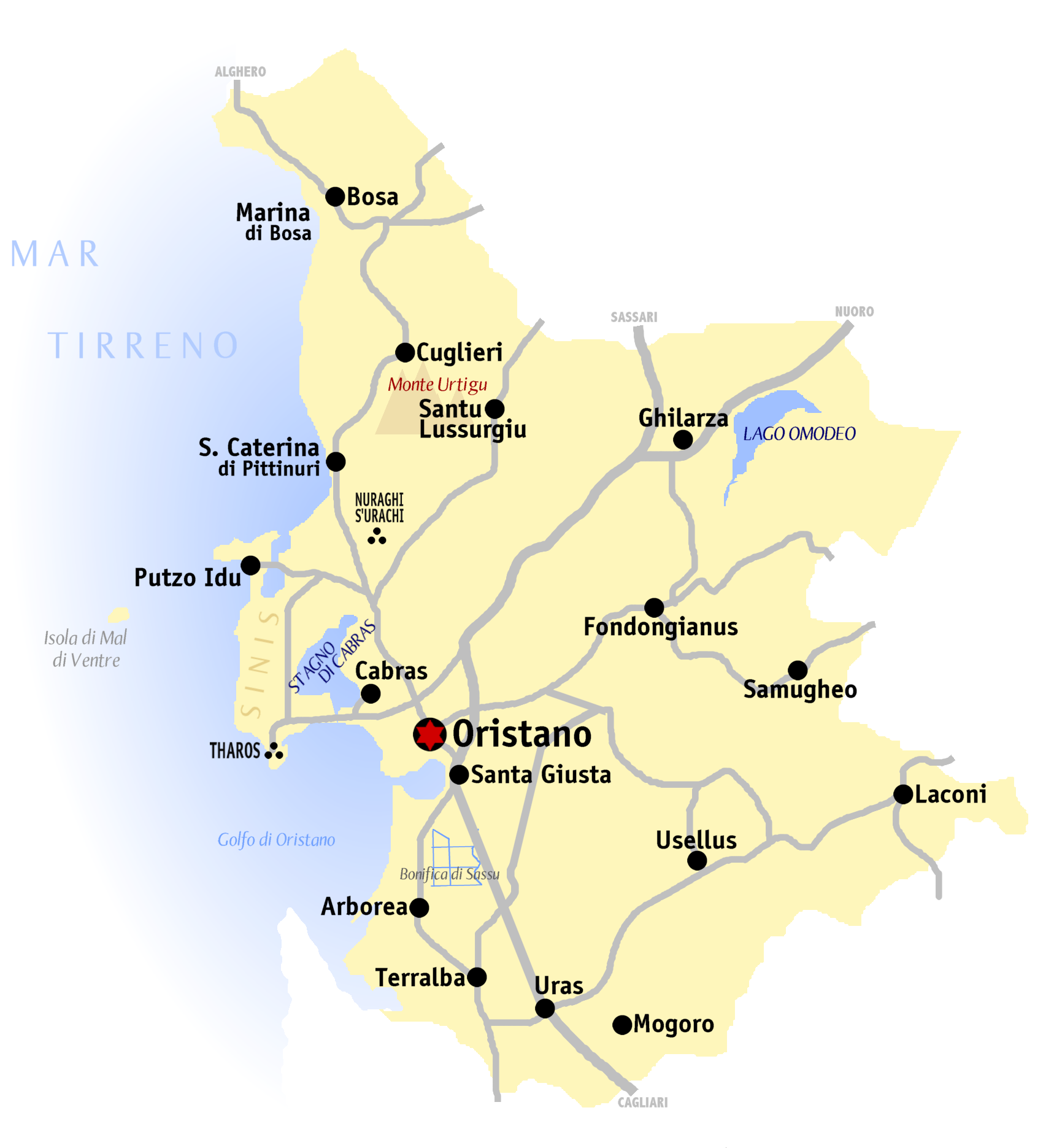
The province of Oristano where Vernaccia di Oristano may have originated. Also shown on the map is the location of the ruins of the Phoenician settlement of Tharros on the coast of the Gulf of Oristano.

Other theories postulate that the name could be derived from other Latin words such as verrum, meaning boar, based on the beasts that are common in central Italy and known to trespass into vineyard and eat the grapes on the vine. The Latin word for winter, ibernum, is another possibility since many of the Vernaccia species were used as table grapes for eating during the winter months. One other contending theory is that the village of Vernazza in the Cinque Terre region of Liguria on the northwest coast of Italy could be a potential origin and eponym for some of the Vernaccia grapes. However, in the case of Vernaccia di Oristano there is no direct evidence linking the grape to the Ligurian wine region.

== Viticulture ==
Vernaccia di Oristano is a mid to late ripening grape variety that can be very sensitive to the dangers from late spring frost during the growing season. It is also susceptible to the viticultural hazards of infection from downy and powdery mildew.

=== Relationship to other grapes ===
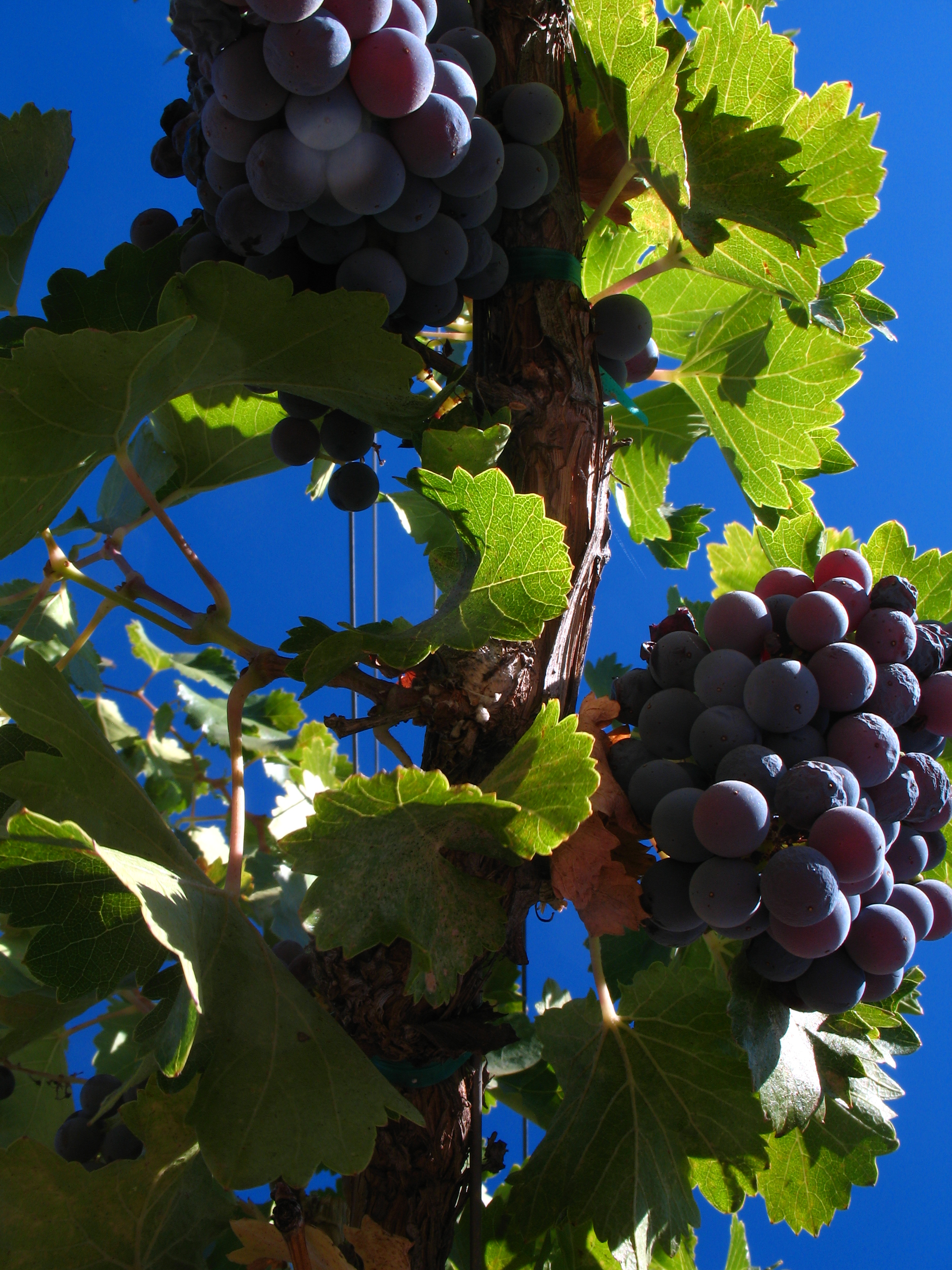
While Grenache (pictured) is known under the synonym of Vernaccia nera in some parts of Italy, it doesn't appear to have any close genetic relationship with Vernaccia di Oristano.

Despite similarities in names and synonyms, DNA analysis has shown that Vernaccia di Oristano is a distinct variety that is not closely related to the several other grapes that share the name Vernaccia. This includes the Tuscan wine grape Vernaccia used to make the Denominazione di Origine Controllata e Garantita (DOCG) wine of Vernaccia di San Gimignano as well as the red wine grapes Aleatico which is known as Vernacia di Pergola in southern Italy and Grenache which is known under the synonym of Vernaccia nera in the Marche region and Umbria.

DNA has shown a possible close genetic relationship of parent-offspring between Vernaccia di Oristano and the white Emilia-Romagna wine grape Santa Maria used to make Vin Santo style wines in the province of Piacenza.

== Wine regions ==
In 2000, there were 582 hectares (1,440 acres) of Vernaccia di Oristano planted in Italy, almost exclusively in the province of Oristano in the lower Tirso river valley on the west coast of the island. Here it is the exclusive grape behind the DOC wine of the same name which is made in both dry and sweet styles as well as fortified liquoroso wines.

According to DOC requirements, Vernaccia di Oristano grapes are limited to a maximum harvest yield of 8 tonnes/hectare (≈ 3.5 tons/acre). The wine is then aged in barrels (often made of chestnut instead of oak) for at least two years for fortified styles. The aging requirement is increased to 29 months for secco (dry and unfortified) styles and 53 months for Superiore Riserva (also dry and unfortified) wines.

For unfortified styles, the finished wines must attain a minimum alcohol level of at least 15% to attain DOC designation while the fortified liquoroso styles (both dry and sweet) must contain at least 18% alcohol by volume.

== Styles ==
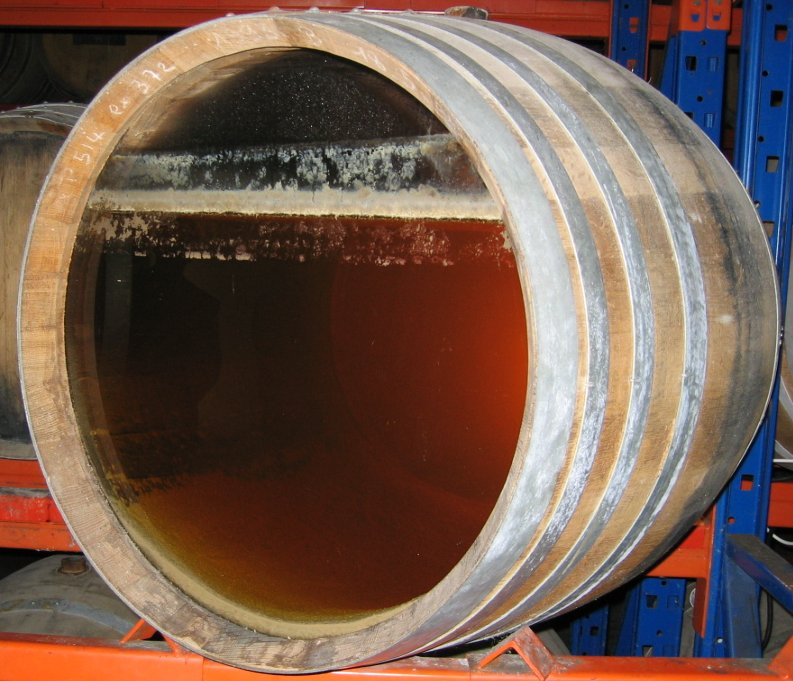
Like Sherry and other sherry-style wines such as the French wine Vin jaune (pictured), Vernaccia di Oristano is often stored in barrels that are only partially filled, leaving a large amount of head space where oxygen can come into contact with the wine. Similar to Fino Sherry and Vin Jaune, there is a formation of the layer of yeast known as Flor (pictured here) to protect the wine from oxygen.

Like Sherry, Vernaccia di Oristano wines are often made utilizing a solera system of "fractional blending" where new wine is added to barrels at the "top" of the solera and then gradually blended into barrels of wine from other vintages as it works it way down through the solera and eventually being bottled. This means that within a single bottle of Vernaccia di Oristano could be blends of wines from several decades of vintages with one Sardinian producer having a solera that contains wine from over 100 different vintages.

Also like some styles of Sherry, Vernaccia di Oristano is intentionally aged in oxidative conditions being stored in barrels that are only partially filled--leaving substantial ullage or head space for oxygen to come into contact with the wine. This can add some complexity to the wine and the presence of nutty, sherry-like aromas and a deep golden color, particularly for the sweeter dolce styles.

== Synonyms ==
Over the years, Vernaccia di Oristano has been known under a variety of synonyms including: Aregu biancu, Aregu Seulu, Cagnaccia, Carnaggia, Cranaccia, Garnaccia, Granazza, Moranina, Varnaccia, Vernaccia, Vernaccia Austera, Vernaccia bianca, Vernaccia Orosei, Vernaccia S. Rosalia, Vernaccia San Rosalia, Vernaccia di S. Vero Milis, Vernaccia di San Vero Milis and Vernaccia di Solarussa.
