= Asprinio bianco =

Variety of grape

Asprinio bianco is a white Italian wine grape variety grown primarily in southwest Italy, around the Naples region of Campania. It is currently not believed to be related to the similarly named French wine grape of the Languedoc region, Aspiran. In Naples the grape is used to make lightly sparkling frizzante wine.

== Synonyms ==
Among the synonyms Asprinio is known under include Asprinia di Aversa, Asprinio, Asprino, Greco, Lacrima, Olivese, Ragusano, Ragusano Bianco, Uva Asprina and Uva Asprinia. DNA profiling has shown that some plantings in Italy, Greco and Asprinio were genetically identical.
