= Girò =

Variety of grape

Girò is a red Italian wine grape variety that is grown on Sardinia and is used mostly in the production of fortified wines in the Giro di Cagliari Denominazione di origine controllata (DOC). The grape was once widely planted throughout Sardinia but its plantings were decimated when the phylloxera epidemic hit the island at the end of the nineteenth century. At the turn of the 21st century there were 552 hectares (1,364 acres) of the grape planted throughout Italy, mostly in the Sardinian provinces of Cagliari and Oristano.

== Origins ==
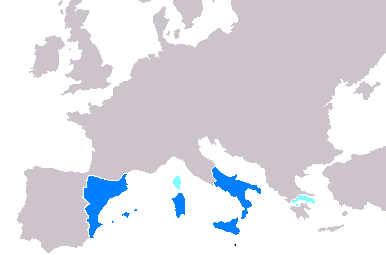
Ampelographers have speculated that the Girò may have originated in northeast Spain and was introduced to Sardinia when both regions were part of the Aragonese Empire.

Wine historians and ampelographers have speculated that the grape has Spanish origins and may have been introduced to the island when it was ruled by the Crown of Aragon. One theory suggest that the grape was brought to Sardinian around the same time that Mazuelo, Graciano and Pascale were introduced.

== Relationship to other grapes ==
In ampelographical text, Girò is often listed as the same variety as Albaranzeuli nero. However while recent DNA profiling has determined that Girò is likely a parent of the Sardinian wine grape Albaranzeuli bianco, the exact relationship between Albaranzeuli Nero and Girò is not yet clear.

There has similarly been a long association between Girò and the white Spanish wine grape Giró blanc grown in Majorca of the Balearic Islands. French ampelographer Pierre Galet was one of the first ampelographers to speculate that Girò and Giró blanc might be separate grape varieties and not just color mutations. Galet's hypothesis was confirmed by DNA analysis in 2007 showing that the two grapes were, indeed, different varieties.

== Viticulture and winemaking ==
The Girò grape has shown itself to thrive in very hot and dry climates, though in these conditions the grapes will lack acidity. The grapes are considered mid to late-ripening and have the potential to accumulate high levels of sugars which lend itself well to the production of sweet wines. Some producers will allow their Girò to hang on the vine long after regular harvest, allowing the grapes to shrivel and desiccate, further concentrating the sugars. Other producers allow the grapes to dry after the harvest on straw mats or in drying rooms.

== Wine styles ==
Girò is most commonly associated with the production of fortified wines that can be produced in both a sweet and dry style. Wine expert Jancis Robinson describes some of the sweeter examples of Girò to be lacking in acidity but having firm tannins and a characteristic cherry aroma.

== Girò di Cagliari DOC ==
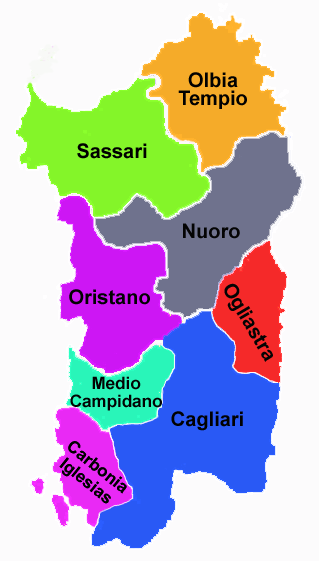
The Girò di Cagliari includes the southeastern province of Cagliari (dark blue) and extends northwest into the neighboring province of Oristano (purple).

Based around the province of Cagliari and extending into vineyards around the commune of Oristano in the neighboring province is the DOC zone dedicated to production of varietal Girò. Both a still red wines and fortified liquoroso styles are produced from grapes that are limited to a harvest yield no greater than 12 tonnes/hectare. All Girò di Cagliari DOC wines must be aged a minimum of nine months prior to release with wines labeled as Riserva requiring two years of aging with at least one of those years being spent in wood.

The basic DOC red wine must have a minimum alcohol level of 14.5% if it has some residual sugars or 14% if it is labeled as dry (secco). Both the sweet (Liquoroso Dolce Naturale) and dry (Liquoroso Secco) fortified styles must have a minimum alcohol level of 17.5%.

== Synonyms ==
Various synonyms have been used to describe Girò and its wines including Gira, Gea, Girò Arzu, Girò Chiaro, Girò Commune, Giro di Spagna, Girò Nieddu, Girò Sardo, Gliata, Zirone, Aghina Barja, Ghjirau, Giro Arrubio, Giro Bragiu, Giro Nero, Giro Niedda, Giro Nigro, Giro Rosso, Giro Rosso di Spagna, Girone, Girone Comune, Girone Comune Rosso, Girone di Spagna, Mances de Capdell, Manses de Capdell, Nieddu Alzu and Zirone di Spagna.
