= Giró blanc =

Variety of grape

Giró blanc is a pink-skinned Spanish wine grape variety grown in the Balearic Islands where it used in white wines produced under the Illes Balears appellation. Ampelographers believe that the grape is indigenous to Majorca with DNA profiling showing no known relationship to the Sardinian wine grape Girò or to Grenache which is known as Girò (without the blanc designation) on Majorca.

Today the grape is almost exclusively found on the island of Majorca with 6 hectares (15 acres) in cultivation in 2012.

== History ==
The Balearic Islands off the eastern coast of Spain. Majorca is the large island in the center of the chain.

Ampelographers believe that Giró blanc is likely indigenous to the island of Majorca. The variety was nearly extinct in the late 20th century with only a few scattered vines left on the island. Spanish winegrowers Toni Gelabert and Juaquin Monserrat began cultivating these vines and eventually had 200 vines available for further propagation by Spanish growers on the Balearic Islands. In 1995, Gelabert produced the first commercial Giró blanc wine from vines planted at his Manacor estate on the western end of Majorca. By 2010 the grape was officially recognized by the Spanish government as a commercial wine grape.

== Viticulture ==
Giró blanc is an early budding but late-ripening grape variety that produces a moderately vigorous canopy with large bunches of small grapes. The grape's skins are relatively thick which gives the berries some protection against the viticultural hazards of downy and powdery mildews but the vine still has some susceptible to fungal infections such as botrytis bunch rot.

=== Relationship to other grapes ===
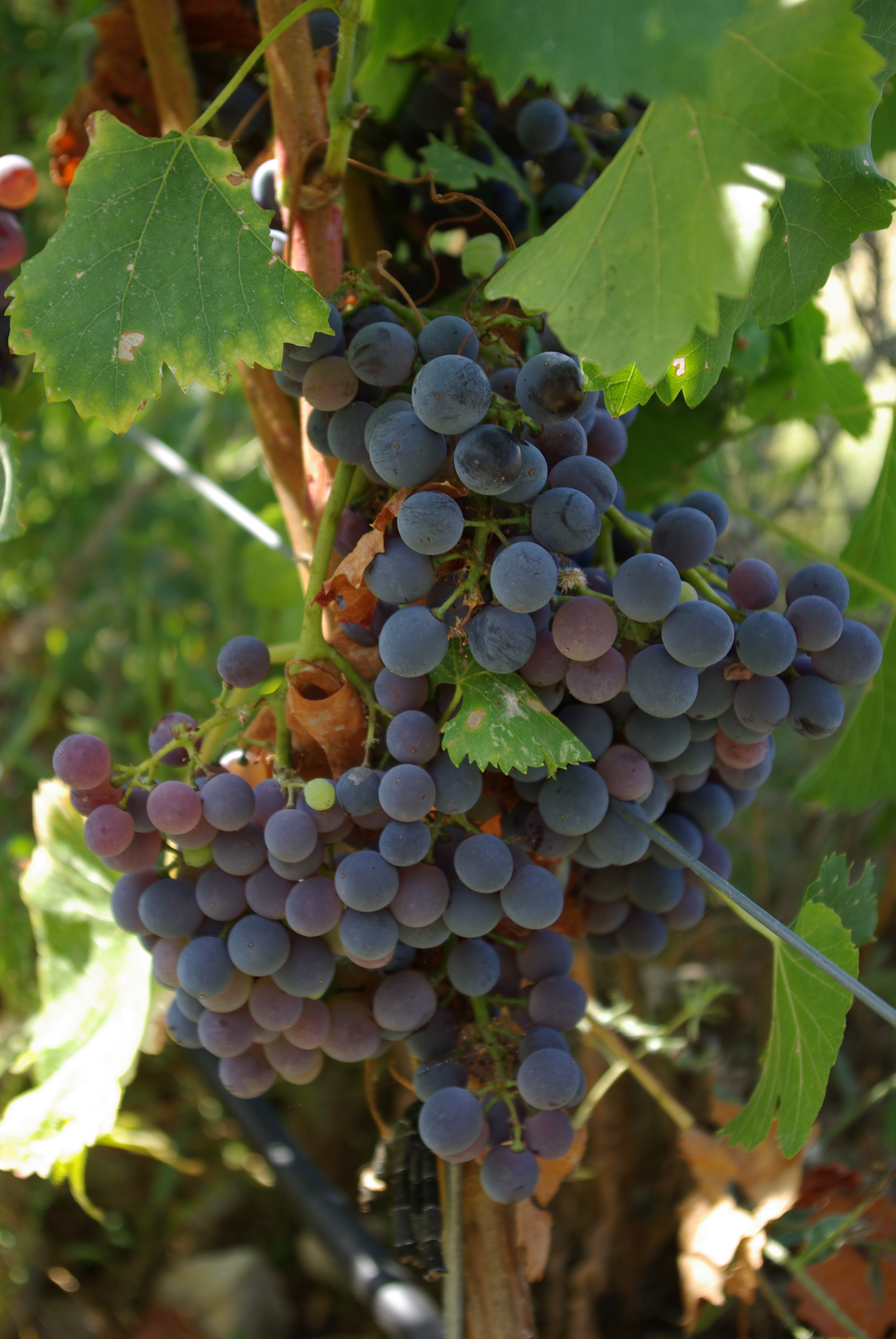
Despite also being known as Giró in the Balearic islands, Grenache (pictured) has no known relationship with Giró blanc.

Historically, Giró blanc was thought to be either a color mutation of Grenache, which is known as Giró in the Balearics, or in someway related to the red Italian wine grape Girò that is grown on the nearby island of Sardinia. The French ampelographer Pierre Galet was one of the first to dismiss these theories and speculate that Giró blanc was its own distinct variety. Galet's intuition was proven correct in the early 21st century when DNA profiling showed that Giró blanc was not related to either Grenache or Girò.

== Wine styles ==
According to Master of Wine Jancis Robinson, Giró blanc produces full-bodied white wines that usually have high alcohol levels and medium acidity which takes well to barrel aging. The wines tend to be highly aromatic with what Robinson describes as "noticeable power for a white wine" with citrus and tropical fruit aromas that can also include a pâtisserie note in some examples.

== Synonyms ==
Over the years, Giró blanc has been known under a variety of synonyms including: Giró blanco and Giró Ros.
