= Albanello bianco =

Variety of grape

Albanello bianco (or just Albanello) is a white Italian wine grape variety grown primarily in Sicily where it has a long tradition producing sweet dessert-style wines from grapes that have been dried in the sun on mats for several days after harvest. In the eighteenth century, the grape was an important component in the rare and expensive Marsala-style wine Ambrato di Comiso.

In recent years, plantings of Albanello have been steadily declining and as of the 2000 census there were 125 hectares (309 acres) of the variety still planted in Italy, nearly all in Sicily. Part of the decline has been attributed to the variety's difficulties to cultivate and tendency to ripen late.

== Wine regions ==
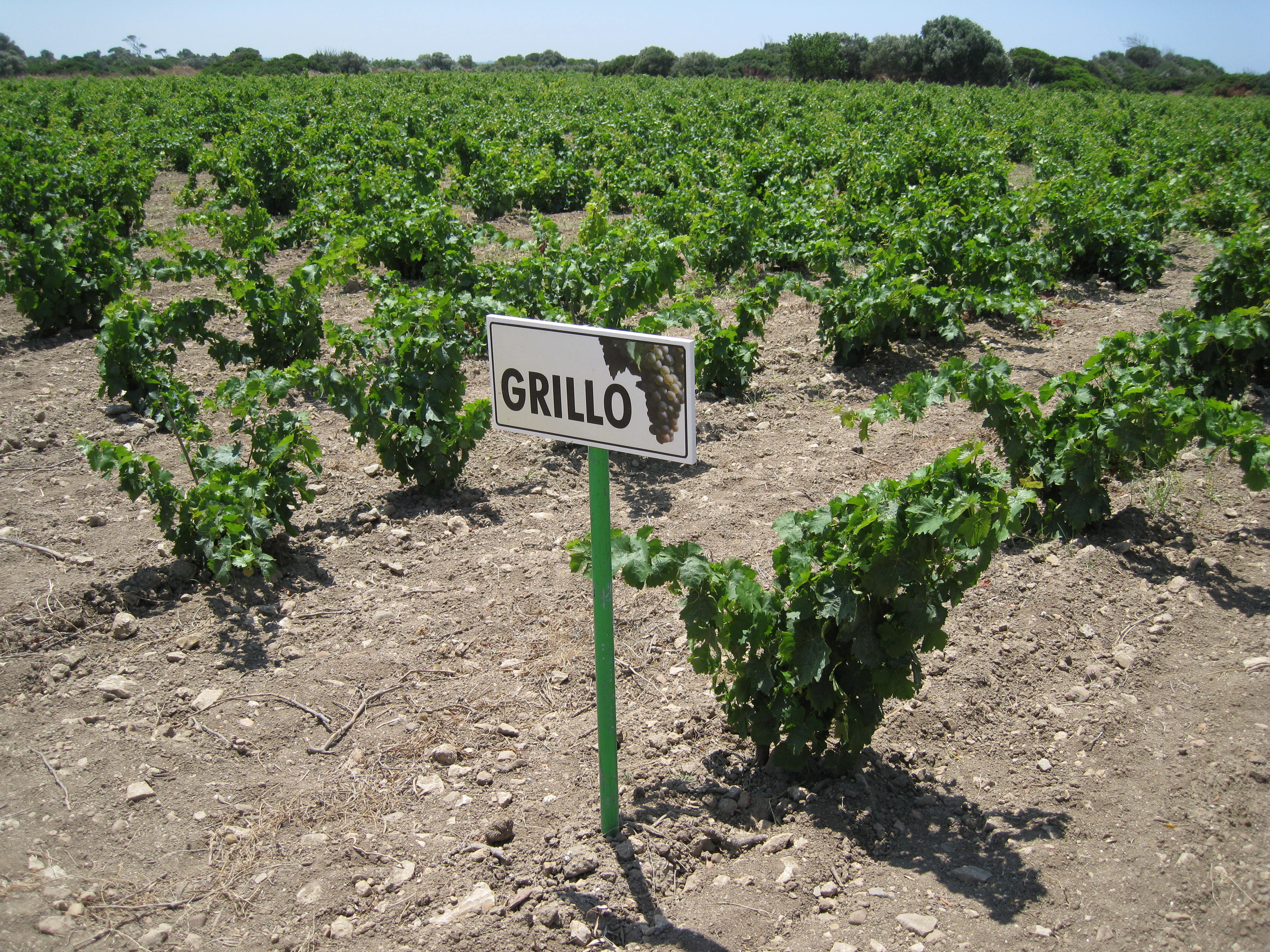
In Sicily, Albanello is often blended with Grillo (pictured)

While plantings of Albanello has sharply declined over the last couple centuries, it can still be found in the Sicilian provinces of Caltanissetta, Catania, Ragusa and Siracusa. In Siracusa, it is still a permitted variety in white wines from the Eloro DOC where it is a minor blending component complementing Catarratto bianco and Grillo.

== Relationship to other grapes ==
Albanello bianco is often confused with the similarly named Albanella from the Pesaro region of Marche along the Adriatic coast. DNA profiling has determined that there is some relationship between Albanello and the Sardinian wine grape Albaranzeuli bianco but the exact connection is unclear.

== Synonyms ==
Over the years Albanello has been known under a variety of synonyms including Alablanca, Albanella, Albanello Bianco di Siracusa, Alvanella, Alvanello, Arnina Bianca, Arvina and Claretta.
