= Albaranzeuli bianco =

Variety of grape

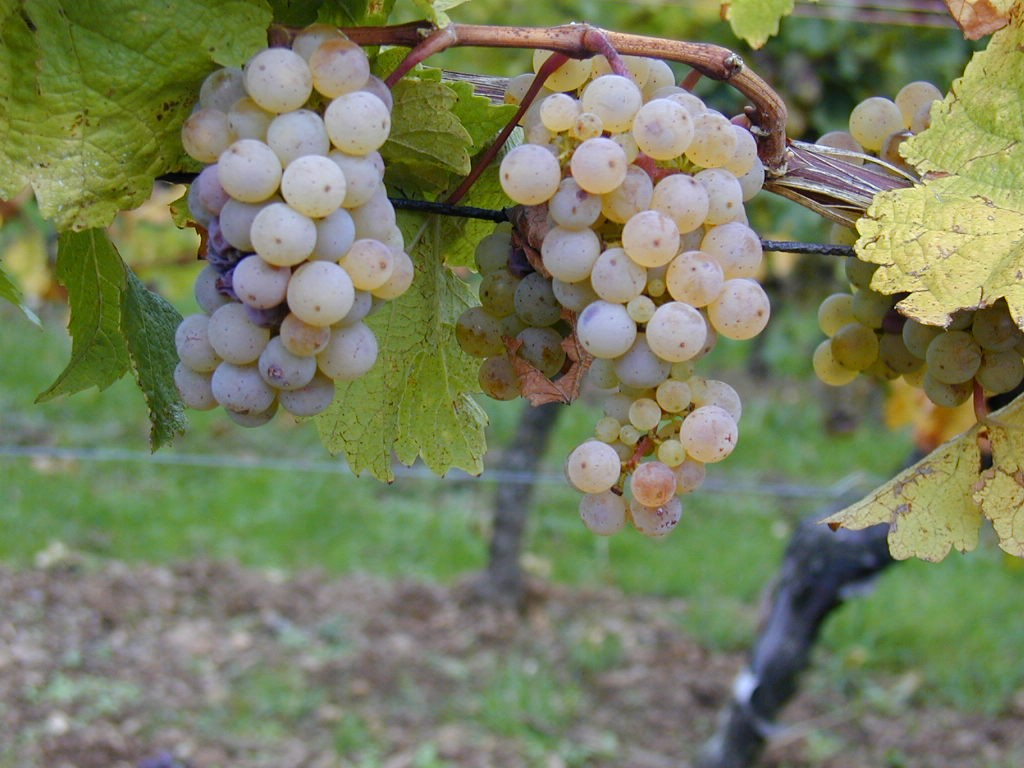

Albaranzeuli bianco is a white Italian wine grape variety that is grown primarily in Sardinia. Ampelographers used to believe that the grape was originally Spanish in origin and was introduced to the island when it was ruled by the Crown of Aragon. Recent DNA profiling has suggested that the grape may have originated on the island as a crossing between the red Sardinian wine grape Girò and the Spanish table grape Molinera, known locally as Pansa Rosa di Málaga and distinct from the Veneto wine grape Molinara that is used in Amarone. A pink skinned grape known as Albaranzeuli nero is also found in Sardinia but its exact relationship to Albaranzeuli bianco is not yet clear.

== Wine regions ==
According to wine expert Jancis Robinson, Albaranzeuli bianco is "virtually extinct" with only 75 hectares (185 acres) of the grape left in Sardinia according to a 2000 census. Most of these plantings were part of field blends with other local varieties in old vineyards scattered throughout the provinces of Nuoro and Oristano.

== Viticulture and winemaking ==
Albaranzeuli bianco is a late-ripening grape that is known for its high yield potential and its good resistance to viticultural hazards such as fungal diseases.

The grape is permitted in several Indicazione geografica tipica (IGT) wines in Sardinia where it is used for both dry white and sparkling wines.

== Relationship to other grape varieties and origins ==
For years ampelographers believed that Albaranzeuli bianco may have been a Spanish variety, potentially even a clone of the Ribera del Duero wine grape Albillo. However, DNA research in 2010 confirmed that the two grapes were different but suggested that AlbaranzeulibBianco may be a crossing another Sardinian grape with possible Spanish origins, Girò, and the Spanish table grape Molinera.

The genetic link between the white skinned Albaranzeuli bianco and the pink skinned Albaranzeuli nero is not exactly clear. DNA testing has also revealed there may be some connection between the grape and the Sicilian variety Albanello and the Marche grape Albanella which are often confused for each other.

== Synonyms ==
Over the years, Albaranzeuli bianco has been known under a variety of synonyms including: Albaranzèllu, Alvarenzeli, Alvarenzell, Alvaranzeuli, Alvaranzeuli bianco, Lacconargiu, Lacconarzu, Lacconazzu biancu, Laconari bianca, Laconarzu, Laconazzu bianco, Liconargiu and Licronasciu.
