= Vernaccia =

Variety of grape

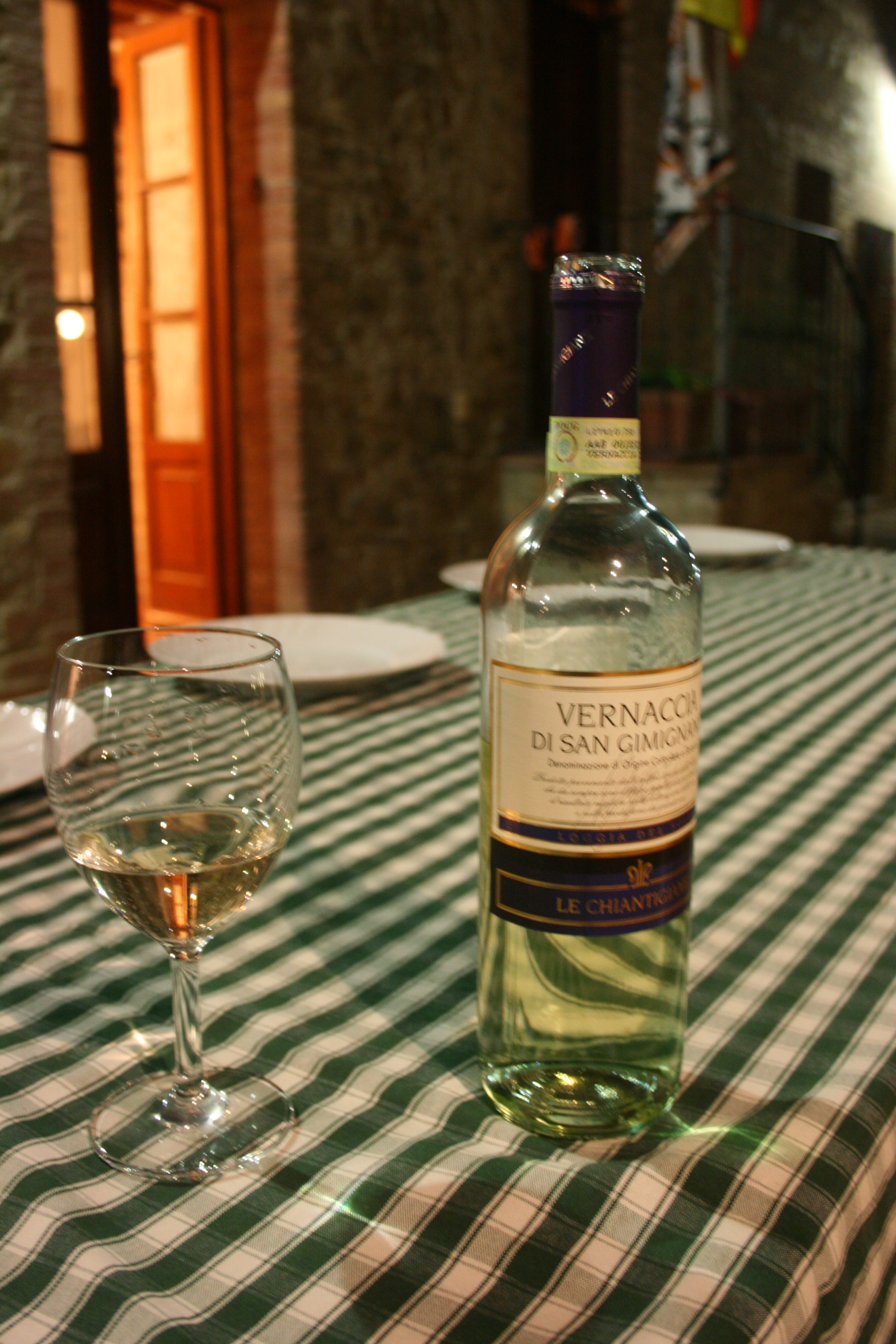
A Tuscan wine made from Vernaccia.

Vernaccia is a white wine grape that is found in many Italian wines but is most commonly associated with the Tuscan wine Vernaccia di San Gimignano. Ampelographers have determined that the Vernaccia vine has many clonal varieties but is unrelated to some Italian vines known as "Vernaccia" such as the Sardinian varieties used in the Sherry-like wine Vernaccia di Oristano, the Trentino-Alto Adige/Südtirol red wine grape known as Vernatsch or the black grape used in the red sparkling wine of the Marche Vernaccia di Serrapetrona. A possible reason for this is that the root of the name Vernaccia translates to different Italian vernaculars and other languages (such as German and Sardinian) and can apply to any local grape.

== History ==
The Tuscan variety of Vernaccia appears to be an ancient variety but ampelographers disagree as to whether the grape's origins are Eastern European, Greek or Roman. In the Middle Ages, a Vernaccia wine known as Vernage was popular in London.

== Wine style ==
The white wine grape of Vernaccia di San Gimignano is the most well known variety of Vernaccia and produces crisp wine with good acidity and citrus fruit. It is sometimes blended with Trebbiano but is also seen as a varietal wine.

== Other varieties ==
The Sardinian Vernaccia of Vernaccia di Oristano is known as Vernaccia di Oristano. Two other wines that were available in Sardinia in the 1960s were Sardinian Gold and Sardinian Silver. The Marche grape of Vernaccia di Serrapetrona is Vernaccia Nera.

== See also ==
- List of Italian grape varieties
