= Albaranzeuli nero =

Variety of grape

Albaranzeuli nero is a red Italian wine grape variety that is primarily found in Sardinia. The grape is often confused with the red Sardinian grape Girò which is believed to be a parent variety of the white grape Albaranzeuli bianco. However recent DNA profiling has not established a direct link between Albaranzeuli nero and either Girò or Albaranzeuli bianco.

== History ==
Ampelographers use to believe that the grape was originally Spanish in origin and was introduced to the island when it was ruled by the Crown of Aragon. The hypothesis was bolstered by the grape's Spanish name and its association with Albaranzeuli Bianco which has also been theorized to have had Spanish origins.

== Viticulture ==
The annual growth cycle of Albaranzeuli nero is characterized by its mid-season budding and its late-season ripening. The vine produces reddish-pink medium-sized berries with very thin skins.

== Wine regions ==
As of a 2000 census there were only 42 hectares (104 acres) of Albaranzeuli nero planted, most of it in the Nuoro province in northeastern Sardinia. Here it is used to produce mostly dry rosés characterized by moderate acidity and alcohol levels.

== Synonyms ==
Over the years Albaranzeuli nero has been known under a variety of synonyms including Albarenzelin nero, Alvaranzeuli nero and Alvarenzelin nero.
