= Arvesiniadu =

Variety of grape

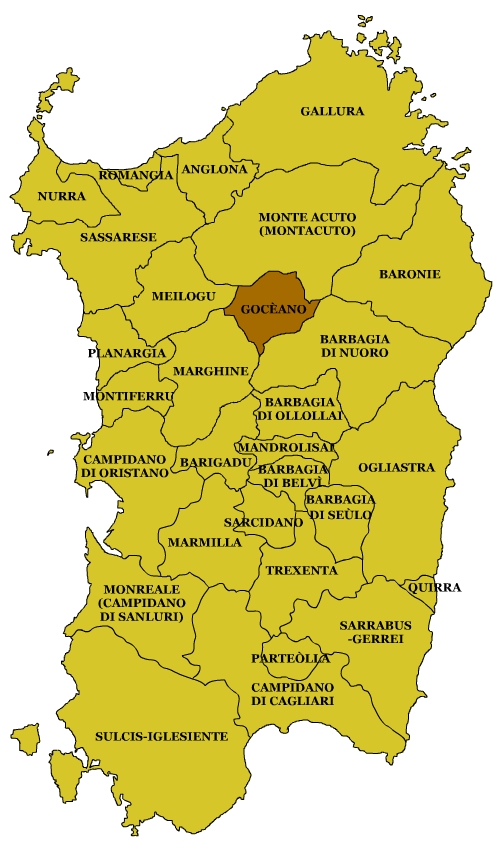
Arvesiniadu is typical wine of Goceano

Arvesiniadu or Arvisionadu is a rare native white Italian wine grape variety that is grown on the island of Sardinia in historic region of Goceano. It is usually used in blends but can also be made into sweet or dry varietal style wines under the Indicazione geografica tipica (IGT) designation of Isola dei Nuraghi.

The research project "AKINAS - Unique vines from the biodiversity of Sardinia" defines Arvisionadu as a "Unicum", a term used to define those vines for which no genetic correspondence has been found.

== History ==
The first documented mentioning of the Arvesiniadu grape was in Italian wine writer Andrea Manca dell'Arca's 1780 treatise on agriculture in Sardinia.

== Viticulture ==
As first noted in Manca dell'Arca's 18th century book, Arvesiniadu is a late-ripening grape variety that can be very vigorous and prone to producing excessive foliage if not properly cared for by canopy management techniques.

== Regions ==
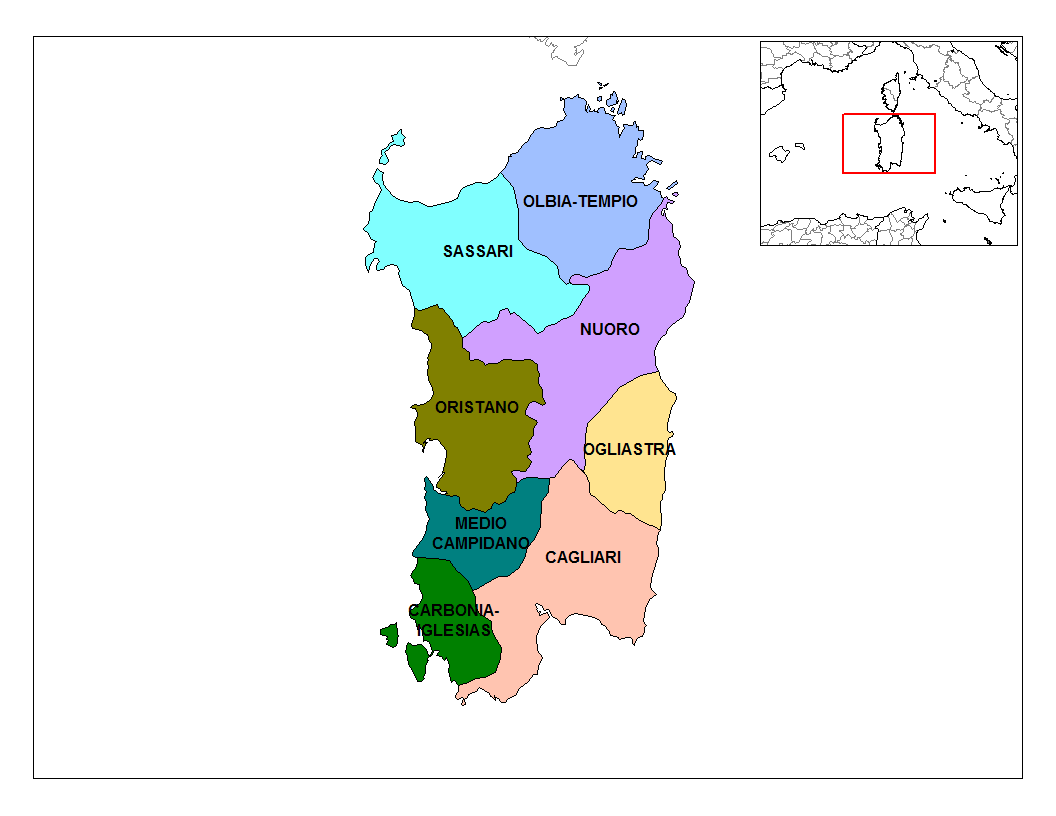
Most plantings of Arvesiniadu are found in the historic region of Goceano, in the center of Sardinia.

Arvesiniadu is found only on the island of Sardinia, particularly in the historic region of Goceano in the comuni of Benetutti and Bono.

As of 2015, there were only 20 hectares (49 acres) of the grape planted on the island.

== Styles ==
Arvesiniadu is most often seen as a blending grape in the white wines of Sardinia, usually as a minor partner to more prominent white Sardinian varieties like Malvasia, Nuragus and Vermentino. Under the IGT designation of Isola dei Nuraghi the grape can be made a varietal in either dry or sweet passito style.

== Synonyms ==
Over the years, Arvesiniadu has been known under a variety of synonyms including: Arvisionadu, Alvu Signadu, Argu Ingianau, Argu Ingiannau, Arvesimiadu bianco, Arvu Siniadu, Arvusiniadu, Arvusiniagu, Avrisiniadu and Uva Oschirese.
