= Chelva (grape) =

Variety of grape

- Grape (Vitis)
- Color of berry skin: Blanc
- Species: Vitis vinifera
- Also called: (more)
- Origin: Extremadura, Spain
- VIVC number: 2520

Chelva is an old variety of white wine grape originating in Extremadura, Spain. In 2015, there were 5,730 ha (14,159 acres) of Chelva vineyards in Spain, almost all of which were in Extremadura.

== Synonyms ==
Chelva is also known under the synonyms Chelva de Cebreros, Chelva de Guareña, Eva, Forastera Blanca, Gabriela (Pajarete and Arcos), Guarena, Mantúo, Mantúo de Pilas, Montúa, Montúo de Villanueva, Montúo Gordo, Uva Rey or Uva del Rey, Uva de Puerto Real, Villanueva.
