= Prensal =

Variety of grape

- Grape (Vitis)
- Color of berry skin: Blanc
- Species: Vitis vinifera
- Also called: see list of synonyms
- Origin: Spain
- Notable regions: Balearic Islands

Prensal is a white wine grape variety from the Balearic Islands, Spain. It is an authorised variety of the island's wine region of Binissalem (DOP), and there were 145 ha (359 acres) of Prensal grown in Spain in 2015.

== Synonyms ==
Moll, Pensal Blanca, Premsal, Premsal, and Prensal Blanc are further names for Prensal.
