= Monica (grape) =

Variety of grape

Monica is a red wine grape that is grown primarily in Sardinia and is one of the few grapes that wine regulations allow to appear on the wine label. The vine originated in Spain but is rarely grown there in recent times. The wine made from these grapes tends to be simple wines made to be consumed young.

Monica di Cagliari is a notable sweet wine made from the grape. Monica di Sardegna is a drier wine.
