= Biancolella =

Variety of grape

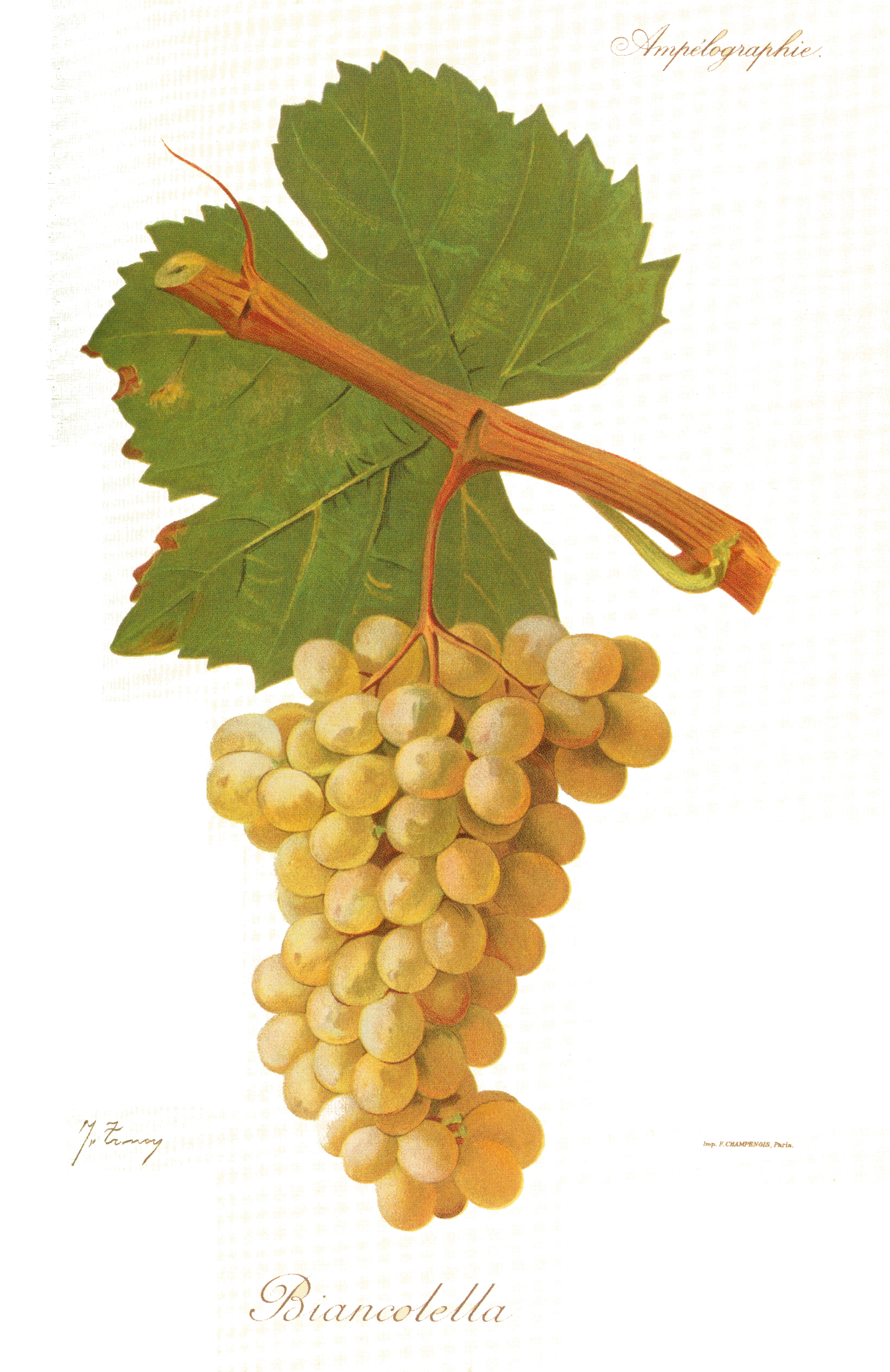
Biancolella by Jules Troncy

Biancolella is a white Italian wine grape variety grown primarily in the Campania region of southern Italy. It is a permitted grape in a few Campanian Denominazione di origine controllatas (DOCs) but is used mostly as a blending variety. Orsi Family Vineyards in Healdsburg, California, is the first grower of Biancolella in the USA.

== Synonyms ==
Among the synonyms that have been used to describe Biancolella and its wine include Bianca, Bianca Tera, Biancolella selvatica, Biancolella Veraca, Biancolella Verace, Biancolillo, Bianculella, Bianculellu, Ianculella, Ianculillo, Jancolella, Janculella, Janculillo, Petite blance and Petite Blanche.
