= Bovale =

Variety of grape

Bovale is a name attributed to two Italian wine grape varieties that are known more commonly by their Spanish names. The most widely planted is Bovale Grande (Carignan/Mazuelo) which has larger berries, while Bovale Sardo (Graciano) which has slightly smaller berries and tends to produce a more austere wine is found more rarely. Both are found on the island of Sardinia where they are used mainly for blending.

== Synonyms ==
Among the synonyms that have been used to describe Bovale Grande and its wines include Bovale Murru, Bovale di Spagna, Bovale Mannu, Maraiola Maggiore, Mostaia, Nieddara, Nièddera, Nieddu Mannu, Tintiglia, Tintilia, Tintillosa, Tintirella and Zinzillosa.

Synonyms attributed separately to Bovale Sardo include Bovale Piccolo, Bovale Piticco, Bovaleddo, Bovaleddu, Cadelanisca, Cardanissia, Carrixa, Moraiola Minore, Muristeddo, Muristellu and Nieddu Prunizza.
