= Vernaccia di San Gimignano =

Geographically controlled Italian wine

Coordinates: 43.468°N 11.042°E

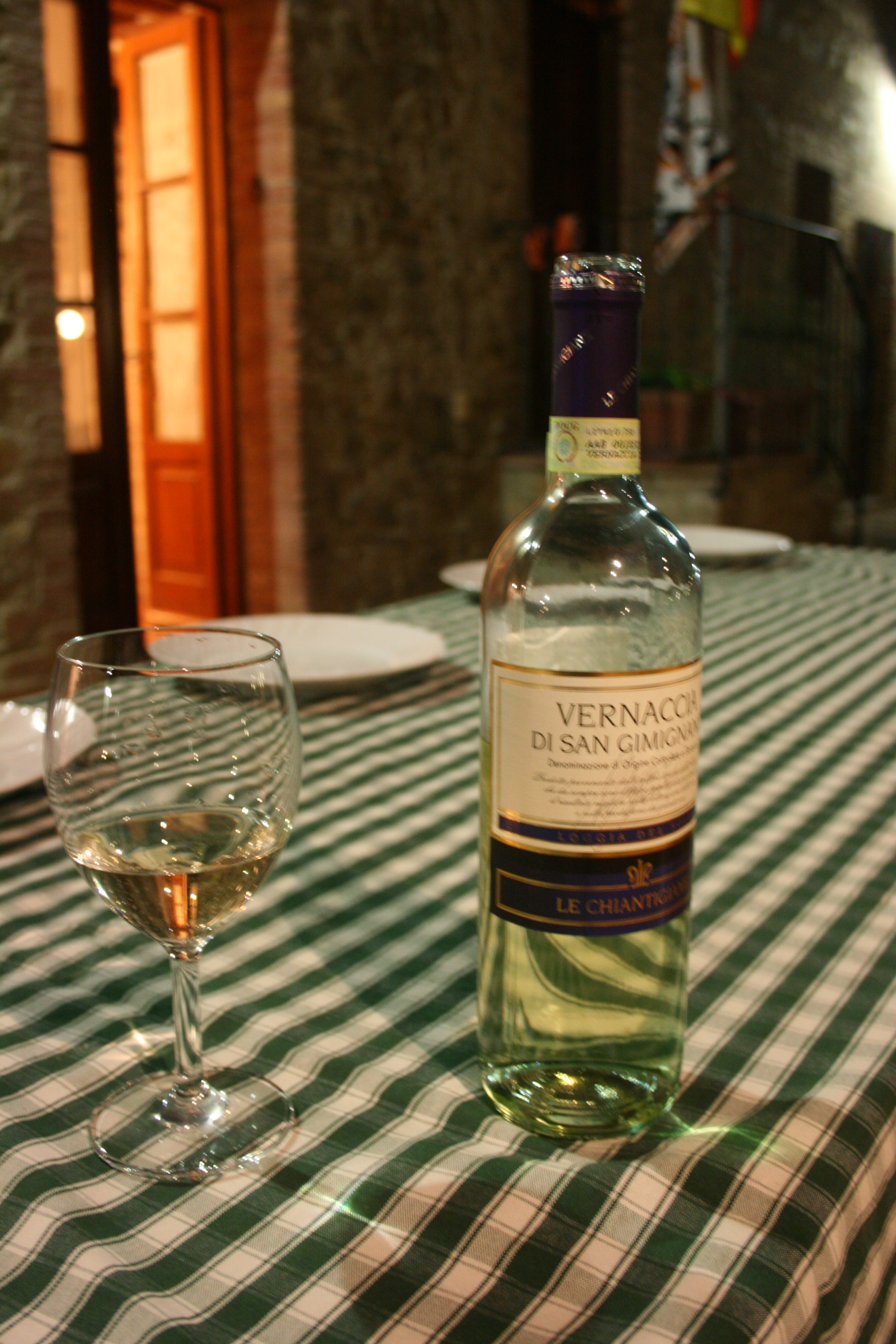
A bottle and glass of Vernaccia di San Gimignano

Vernaccia di San Gimignano is a white Italian wine, made from the Vernaccia grape, produced in and around the Italian hill town of San Gimignano, in Tuscany. It was the first Italian wine to be awarded denominazione di origine controllata (DOC) status in 1966; on July 9, 1993, it was upgraded to denominazione di origine controllata e garantita (DOCG).

== History ==
The earliest recorded mention of the wine appears in the archives of record of San Gimignano from 1276. Due to the difficulties in cultivating the Vernaccia grape, the wine fell out of favor in the early 20th century as the more prolific Trebbiano and Malvasia grapes were planted. By the 1960s, Vernaccia di San Gimignano experienced a resurgence as its distinctive, crisp qualities established it as a popular alternative to the blander wines produced from Trebbiano and Malvasia blends.

== Viticulture and winemaking ==
The name "Vernaccia" is applied to several different Italian grapes, such as the Sardinian grape used in Vernaccia di Oristano and the Marche grape used in the sparkling red wine Vernaccia di Serrapetrona. Ampelographers have determined that the variety grown in San Gimignano is different and distinct from the other Italian Vernaccias and is probably not related. The Tuscan variety is believed to be the oldest grape variety but its origins are not clear with ampelographers disagreeing if it originally came from Eastern Europe, Greece or is indigenous to the Italian Peninsula.

In San Gimignano, the Vernaccia grapes planted in sandstone based vineyards tend to produce the best examples of Vernaccia di San Gimignano. The medium altitude of the vines is approximately 280 meters and the earth is pliocene, made up of yellow sand and sandy clay. The time in which the grape harvest takes place is roughly from September 15 to October 15, with a yield of 90 quintals of grapes per hectare.

The wine is characteristically dry with crisp acidity and a slightly bitter and somewhat metallic finish. Most consider Vernaccia di San Gimignano to be a simple, everyday white; its popularity being owed less to what is in the glass and more to it being the local wine of San Gimignano, one of Tuscany's most touristy towns. Despite this reputation, modern winemaking has introduced the use of oak aging to give the wine another layer of complexity and roundness. While very different from the historic style of Vernaccia di San Gimignano, the success of these more modern and international styles has not yet been established.

These are the characteristics for Vernaccia di San Gimignano:

- Color: yellow straw-like hue, tending towards a golden color with age
- Scent: light and penetrating
- Taste: dry, with a slightly bitter after taste
- Sugar: max. residue 4 g/l
- Total acidity: min. 5 g/l
- Dry extract: net min. 15 g/l
- Alcoholic grade: min. 11%. For the "Riserva" 11.50%.

According to DOC regulations, Vernaccia di San Gimignano must contain 90% Vernaccia, with up to 10% other nonaromatic approved white varieties. In order to meet "riserva" status, ageing must be a minimum of twelve months, including four months in bottle.

== Vernaccia in literature ==
Vernaccia is mentioned by Dante Alighieri (Purgatorio XXIV) as leading to Pope Martin IV's gluttony. He ate Bolsena eels pickled in the wine.

:ebbe la Santa Chiesa in le sue braccia:

dal Torso fu, e purga per digiuno
l’anguille di Bolsena e la vernaccia.

Vernaccia was also praised by Francesco Redi in his work, "Baccio in Toscana" (1685)..

Vernaccia is mentioned by Cecco Angiolieri in an untitled poem: "--S'i' gli avvessi chèsto di vernaccia!--".
