= Callet =

Callet is a surname of French origin. Notable persons with the surname include:

- Antoine-François Callet (1741–1823), French artist
- Félix-Emmanuel Callet (1791–1854), French architect
- Jean-François Callet (1744–1798), French mathematician
- Jerome Callet (1930–2019), American brass musical instrument maker
