= Chalosse =

Wine-growing area in Gascony, France

Coordinates: 43.6932°N 0.7300°W

Chalosse (French pronunciation: [ʃalɔs]; Gascon: Shalòssa or Xalòssa) is a wine-growing area in Gascony, in south-west France. It lies in the departement of Landes and is centred on the town of Dax.

Chalosse also gives its name to coteaux de Chalosse, the wine of the area, and is used to describe both the Ondenc and the Graisse varieties of grape.

== Location ==
Chalosse is located in the foothills of the Pyrenees, around the valleys of the river Louts and the river Luy, both left tributaries of the river Adour. The region is bounded by the Adour and the Pays de Marsan to the north, the river Gabas and the Tursan to the east and by the region of Béarn to the south. The neighbouring terroirs are L'Orient (west), Pays de Marsan (north), Tursan (east), and Bearn (south). The main town is Dax, to the west of the region. Other important towns are Pomarez and Montfort-en-Chalosse.

== Viticulture ==
Chalosse is a wine-growing region, and it gives its name to a number of grape varieties. Ondenc and Graisse are both known as Chalosse; it is also used as a synonym for Claverie (Chalosse blanche), Fer (Chalosse noir) and Meslier-Saint-François (Chalosse de Bordeaux). Chalosse Noire can also refer to a number of black grape varieties.
