= Graisse (disambiguation) =

Graisse may refer to:

- the French word for fat or grease
- Graisse, a grape variety
- Graisse (fault), a wine fault due to abnormal bacterial mallolactic fermentation
