= Argelos, Pyrénées-Atlantiques =

Argelos
- Commune
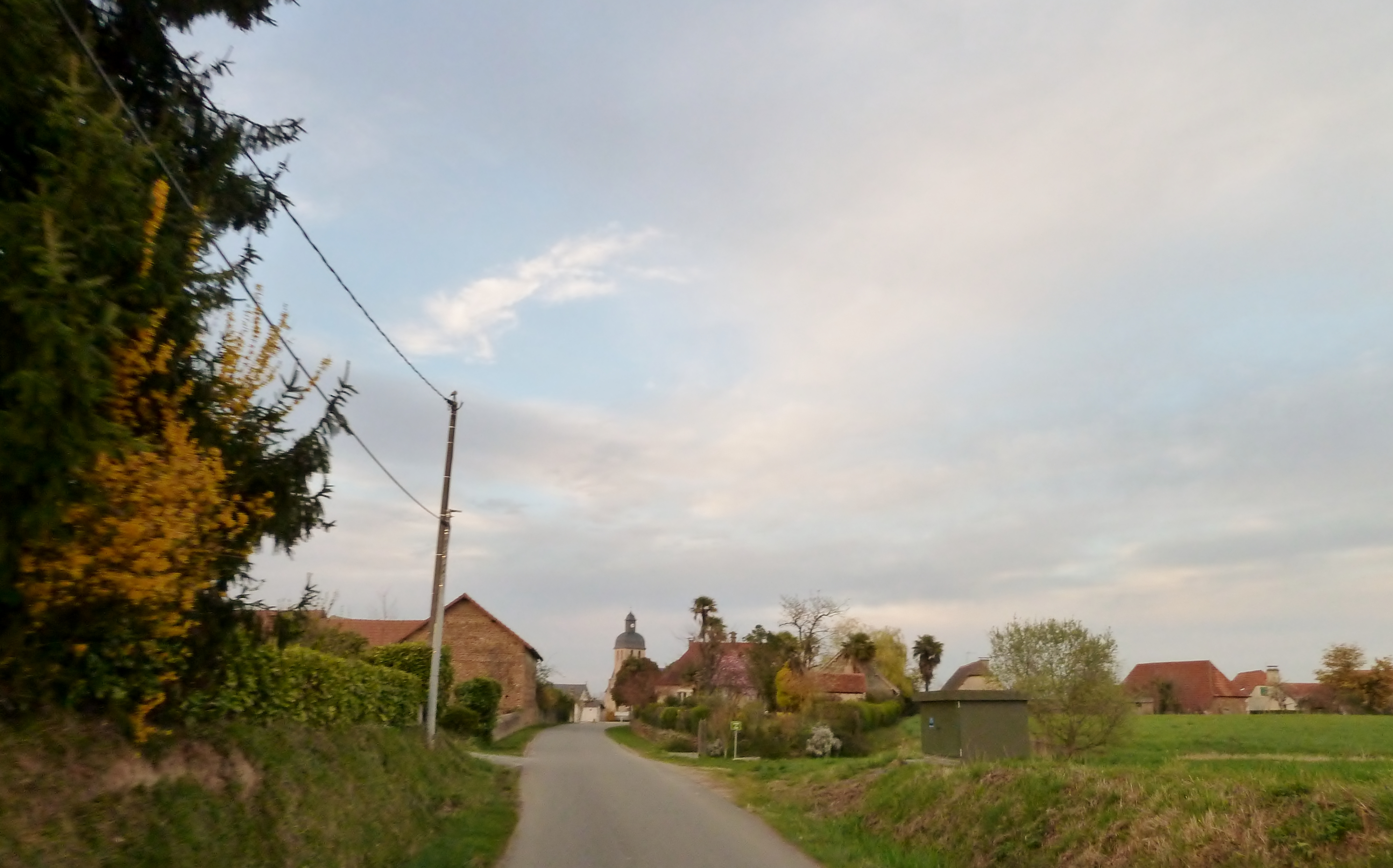
- Argelos
- Location of Argelos
- Location within France Location within Nouvelle-Aquitaine
- Coordinates: 43°27′09″N 0°20′47″W
- Country: France
- Region: Nouvelle-Aquitaine
- Department: Pyrénées-Atlantiques
- Arrondissement: Pau
- Canton: Terres des Luys et Coteaux du Vic-Bilh
- Intercommunality: CC Luys Béarn

Government
  - Mayor (2020–2026): Marcel Borny
- Area^{1}: 6.01 km^{2} (2.32 sq mi)
- Elevation: 158 m (518 ft)
- Highest elevation: 264 m (866 ft)
- Lowest elevation: 142 m (466 ft)
- Population (2023): 263
  - Density: 43.8/km^{2} (113/sq mi)
- Time zone: UTC+01:00 (CET)
  - Summer (DST): UTC+02:00 (CEST)
- INSEE/Postal code: 64043 /64450
- ^{1} French Land Register data, which excludes lakes, ponds, glaciers > 1 km^{2} (0.386 sq mi or 247 acres) and river estuaries.

Argelos (Argelòs in Occitan) is a commune in the Pyrénées-Atlantiques department in the Nouvelle-Aquitaine region of south-western France. It is part of the urban area (aire d'attraction des villes) of Pau.

== Geography ==
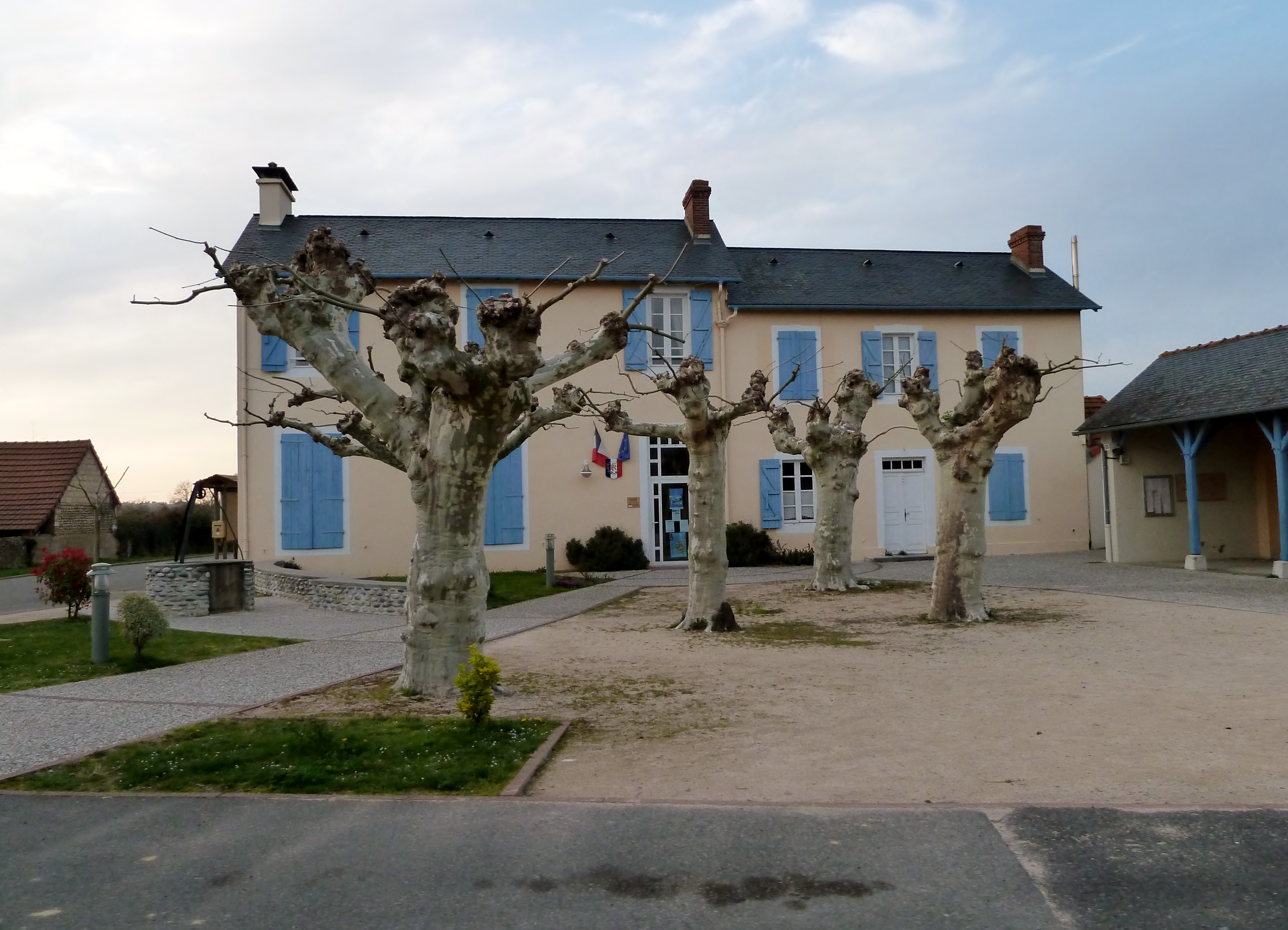
The Town Hall

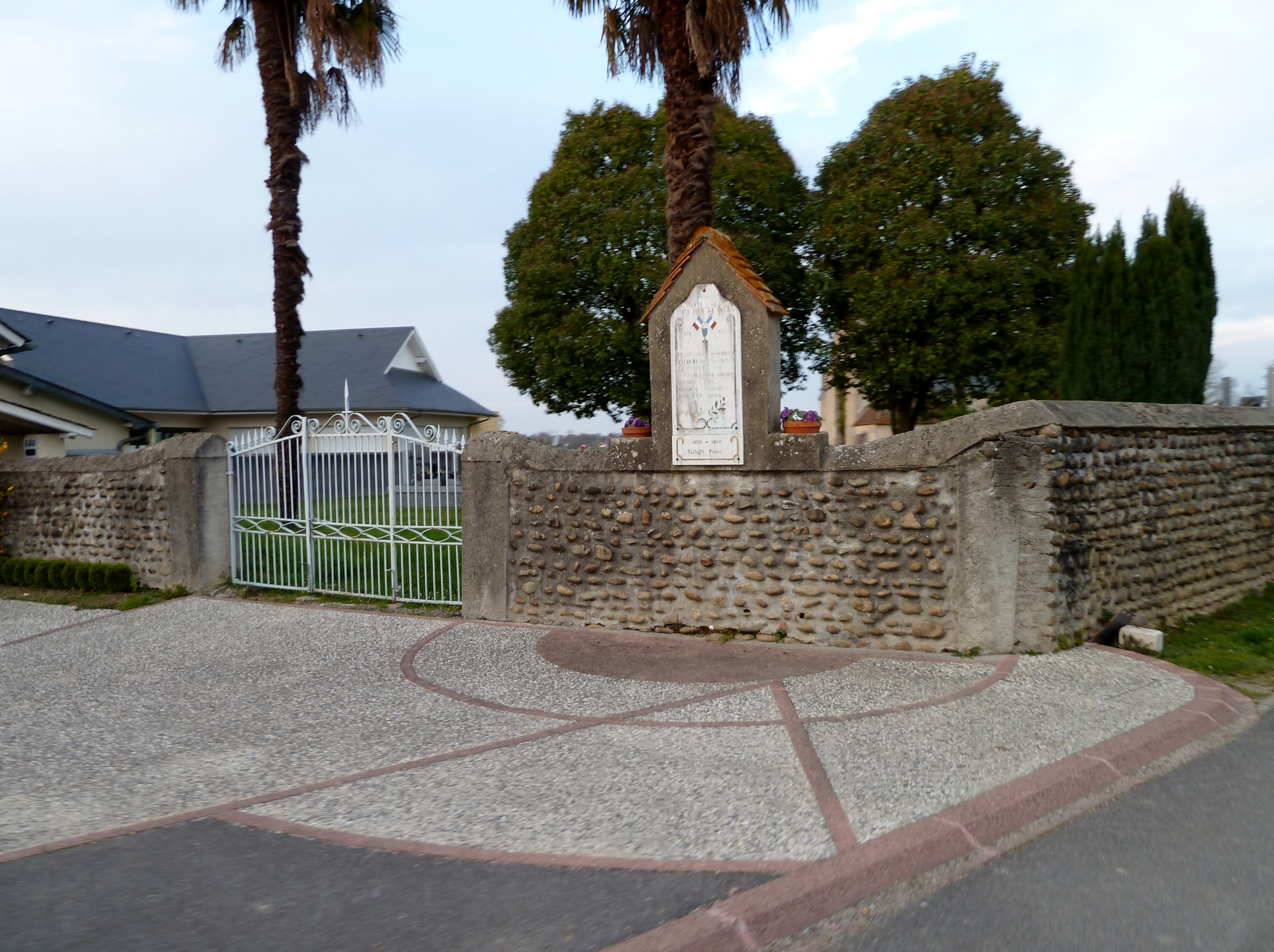
The War Memorial

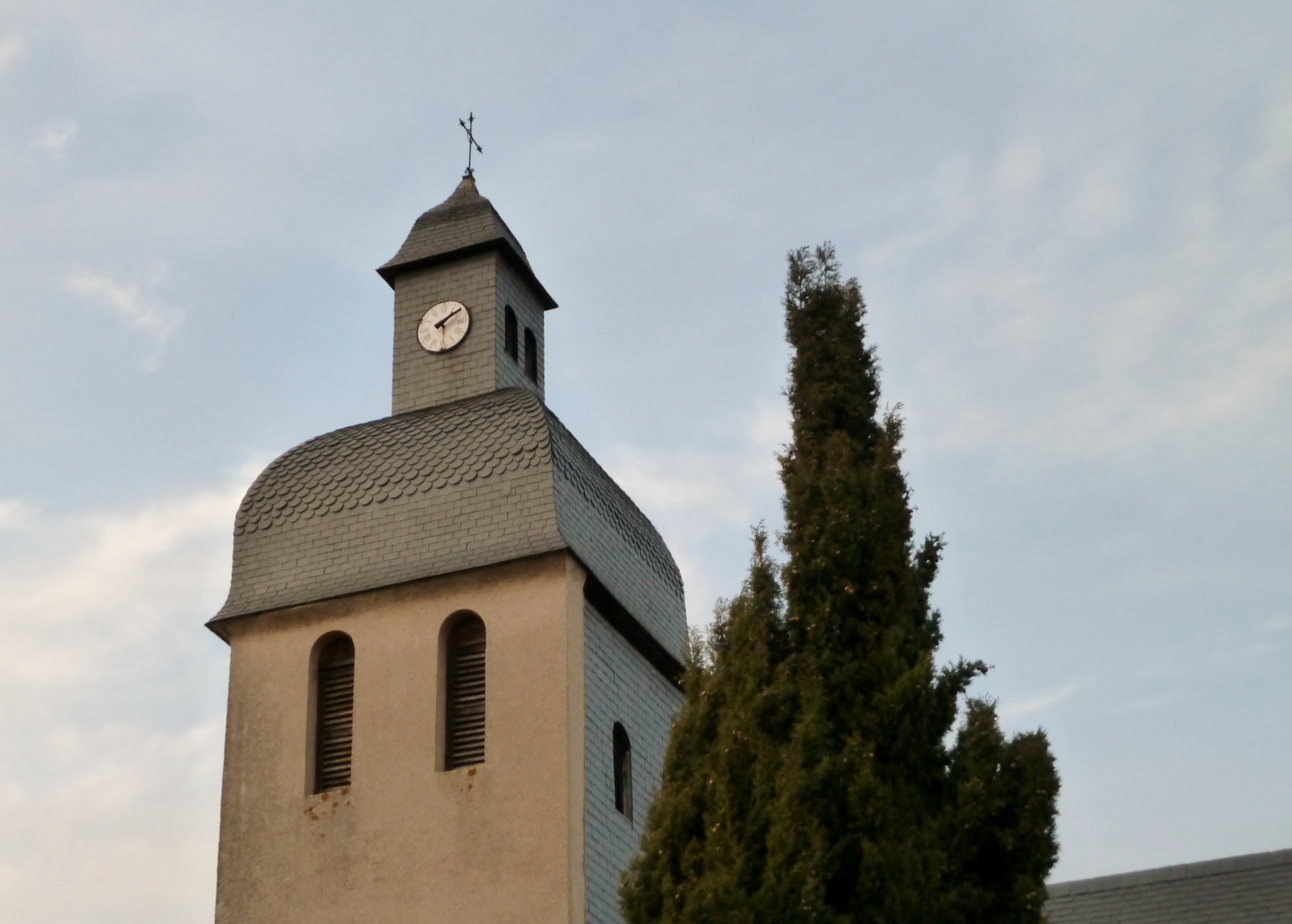
The bell tower of the Church of Saint-André

Argelos is located some 25 km north of Pau and 3 km west of Auriac. Access to the commune is by the D214 road from the village north to join the D944 road south-east of Thèze. The A65 autoroute passes through the northern tip of the commune but the nearest exit is Exit 9 near Miossens-Lanusse. The commune is mixed farmland and forest.

Located in the Drainage basin of the Adour, the Luy de France forms the north-eastern border of the commune as it flows north-west fed by its tributaries the Basta and the Balaing.

=== Places and Hamlets ===
- Barbé
- La Barthe
- Bordenave
- Boué
- Bourdalé
- Bozano
- Brouca
- Carrère
- Cassou
- Castagnet
- Chicoy
- Dibet
- Hargouette
- Hayet
- Labarrane
- Lamarque
- La Lane
- Larricq
- Lavignotte
- Lopou
- Loubané or Loubâne
- Morlaas
- Noble
- Poulou
- Sansarricq
- Tauhuré
- Then

== Toponymy ==
The commune name in béarnais is Argelos. Brigitte Jobbé-Duval indicated that Argelos probably had a Latin origin of argilla (meaning "Clay") with the suffix -ossum. The meaning of the name would then be "clay soil".

The following table details the origins of the commune name and other names in the commune.

Name	Spelling	Date	Source	Page	Origin	Description
Argelos	Argilos	1214	Raymond	10	Chapter of Argelos	Village
	Argelos	1750	Cassini			
Bernès	Bernet	1385	Raymond	10	Census	Farm

Sources:

- Raymond: Topographic Dictionary of the Department of Basses-Pyrenees, 1863, on the page numbers indicated in the table. (in French)
- Cassini: Cassini Map from 1750

Origins:

- Census: Census of Béarn

== History ==
Paul Raymond noted on page 10 of his 1863 dictionary that in 1385 there were 29 fires in Argelos and it depended on the bailiwick of Pau. Auriac was formerly annexed to the commune.

The barony of Viven included Argelos, Auriac, and Viven and was a vassal of the Viscounts of Béarn.

== Administration ==
List of Successive Mayors

From	To	Name
1995	2014	Hélène Peyras
2014	2026	Marcel Borny

=== Intercommunality ===
Argelos is part of 4 inter-communal structures:

- the Communauté de communes des Luys en Béarn;
- the AEP association of the regions of Luy and Gabas;
- the Energy association of Pyrénées-Atlantiques;
- the scholastic association Argelos - Astis.

== Demography ==
Historical population

Year	Pop.	±% p.a.
1793	325	—
1821	357	+0.34%
1846	373	+0.18%
1872	300	−0.83%
1901	268	−0.39%
1926	201	−1.14%
1946	173	−0.75%
1962	133	−1.63%
1968	128	−0.64%

Year	Pop.	±% p.a.
1975	136	+0.87%
1982	131	−0.53%
1990	197	+5.23%
1999	217	+1.08%
2007	253	+1.94%
2012	250	−0.24%
2017	282	+2.44%
2023	263	−1.16%

Source: EHESS and INSEE

== Culture and Heritage ==
=== Civil Heritage ===
The commune has several buildings and sites that are registered as historical monuments:

- The Maison Marque Farmhouse (18th century)
- A Farmhouse at Loubané (18th century)
- The Maison Lavignotte-Lagrela Farmhouse at Lavignotte (18th century)
- A Farmhouse at Lamarque (1725)
- Houses and Farms (18th century)
- A Fortified Complex at Lopou (Middle Ages)

=== Religious Heritage ===
The Parish Church of Saint-André (12th century) is registered as an historical monument. It contains many items which are registered as historical objects:

- The Furniture in the Church
- Two Dalmatics (18th century)
- A Sunburst Monstrance (19th century)
- 4 altar Candlesticks (19th century)
- 2 banks of Pews (19th century)
- A Confessional (18th century)
- An Altar, Tabernacle, and Retable in the Altar of the Virgin (17th century)
- 2 Hanging Lighting Brackets (18th century)
- A Painting: Christ on the Cross (1935)
- 2 Statues: Saints Pierre and André (18th century)
- A Retable (18th century)
- A Tabernacle (17th century)
- An Altar with 2 banks of seating (17th century)
- The whole main Altar

== Education ==
Argelos has a primary school which is shared with Astis as an inter-communal educational grouping.

== See also ==
- Communes of the Pyrénées-Atlantiques department
