= Arzacq-Arraziguet =

- Commune
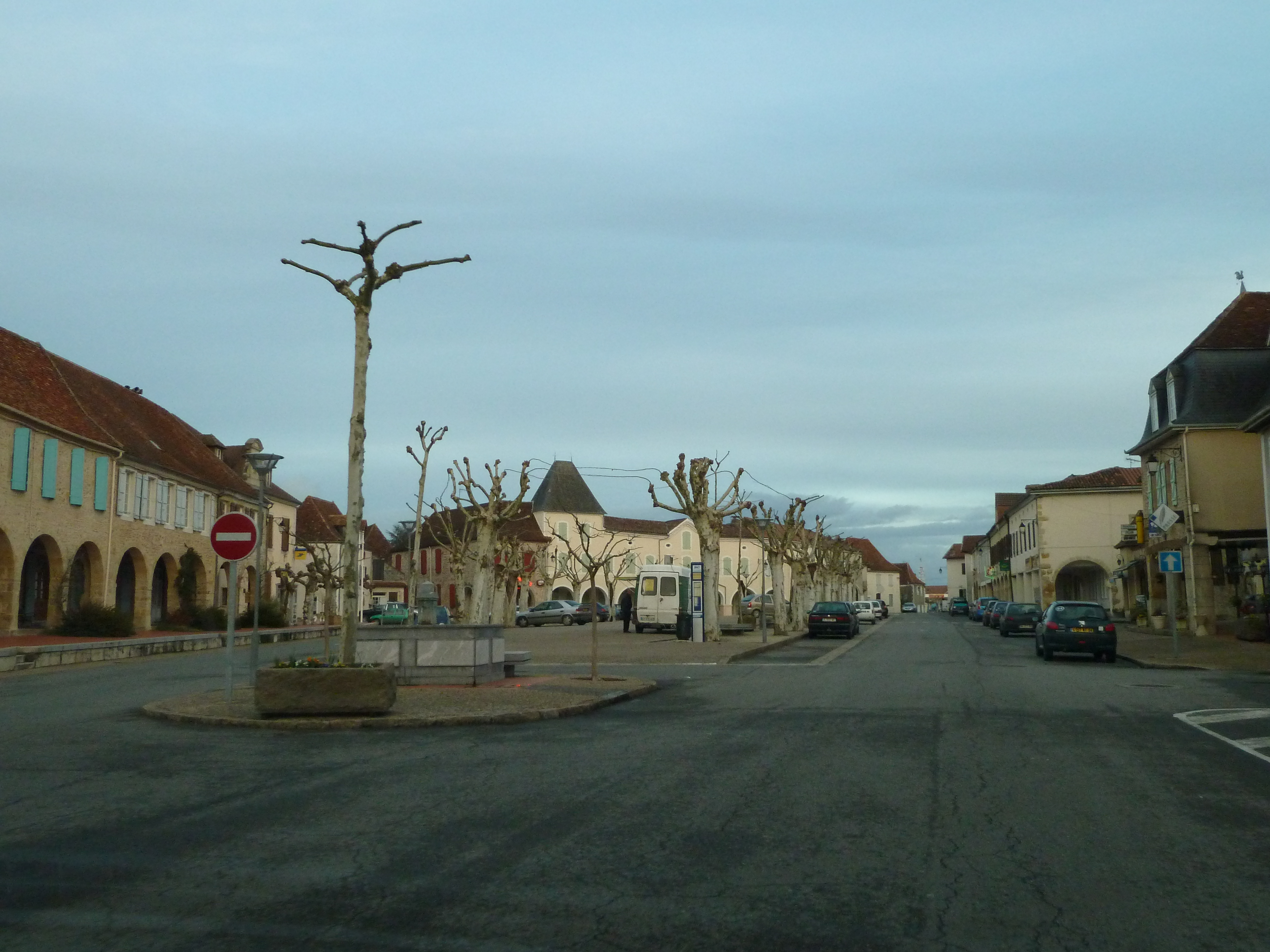
- Main Street

- Coat of arms
- Location of Arzacq-Arraziguet
- Location within France Location within Nouvelle-Aquitaine
- Coordinates: 43°32′12″N 0°24′41″W
- Country: France
- Region: Nouvelle-Aquitaine
- Department: Pyrénées-Atlantiques
- Arrondissement: Pau
- Canton: Artix et Pays de Soubestre
- Intercommunality: CC Luys Béarn

Government
  - Mayor (2020–2026): Jean-Pierre Crabos
- Area^{1}: 15.26 km^{2} (5.89 sq mi)
- Elevation: 224 m (735 ft)
- Highest elevation: 238 m (781 ft)
- Lowest elevation: 95 m (312 ft)
- Population (2023): 1,077
  - Density: 70.58/km^{2} (182.8/sq mi)
- Time zone: UTC+01:00 (CET)
  - Summer (DST): UTC+02:00 (CEST)
- INSEE/Postal code: 64063 /64410
- ^{1} French Land Register data, which excludes lakes, ponds, glaciers > 1 km^{2} (0.386 sq mi or 247 acres) and river estuaries.

Arzacq-Arraziguet (French pronunciation: [aʁzak aʁaziɡɛ]; Occitan: Arsac e Arrasiguet) is a commune in the Pyrénées-Atlantiques department in the Nouvelle-Aquitaine region of south-western France.

== Geography ==
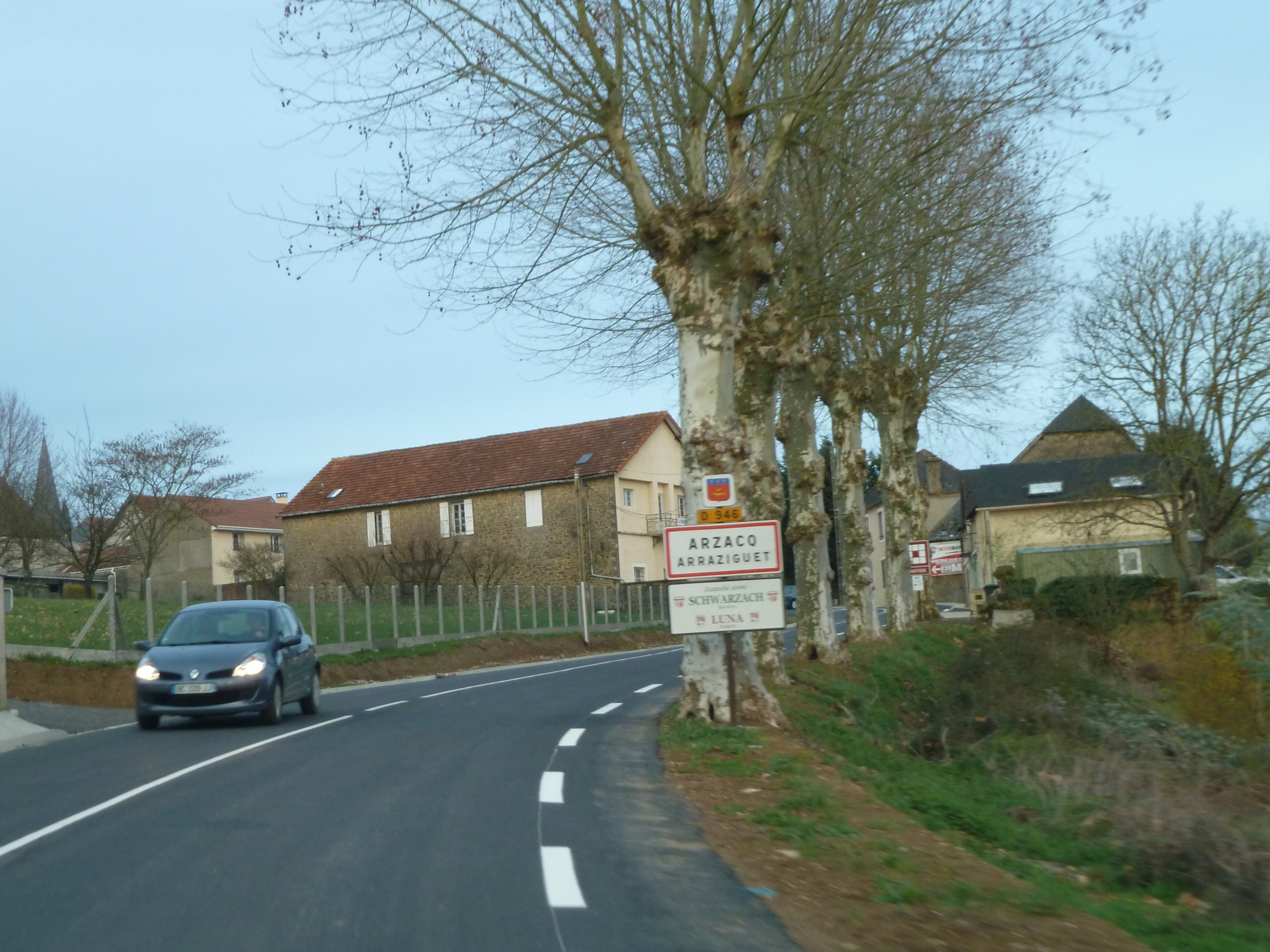
Entry to Arzacq-Arraziguet.

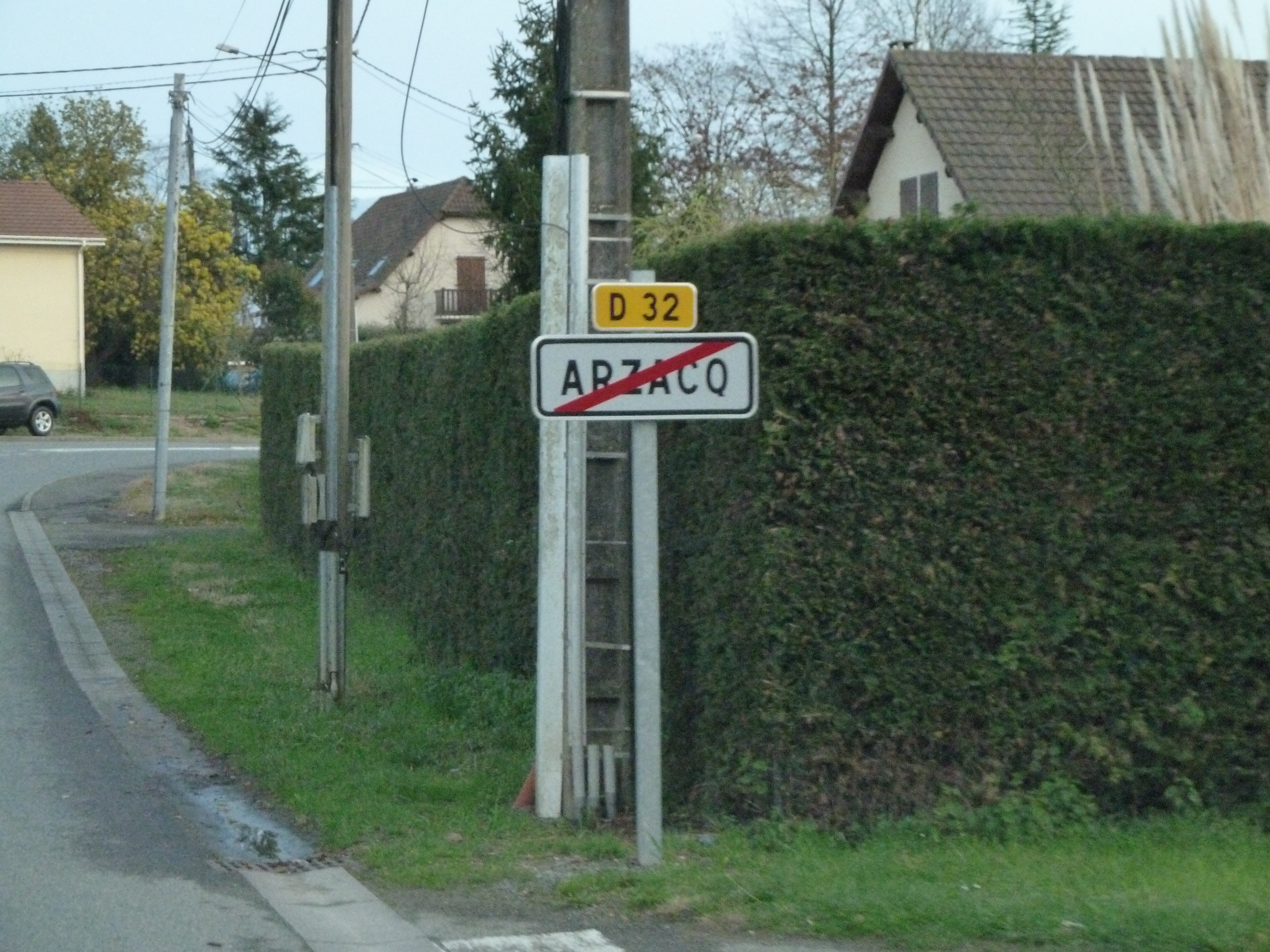
Exit from Arzacq-Arraziguet on the D32

Arzacq-Arraziguet is located in the north-east of the department and of Béarn, 30 km north of Pau and 40 km south of Mont-de-Marsan. The northern and north-eastern border of the commune is the border between the departments of Pyrénées-Atlantiques and Landes. Access to the commune is by the D944 road from Méracq in the south passing through the town and continuing north to Samadet. The D946 road comes from Morlanne in the west passing through the length of the commune and the town and continuing east to join the D834 just south of Garlin. The D246 branches off the D946 in the centre of the commune and goes north-west to join the D45 north of Piets-Plasence-Moustrou. The commune is mostly farmland but with many forests mainly towards the west.

The Louts river passes through the commune from south-east to north-west where it continues north-west to eventually join the Adour on the border of the commune of Préchacq-les-Bains. The Arriou river rises in the south of the commune and flows north-west parallel to the Louts joining it north of the commune. The Luy de France forms the south-western border of the commune as it flows north-west to eventually join the Luy north of Castel-Sarrazin.

=== Places and Hamlets ===
- L'Abattoir
- Barot
- Borde
- La Borde
- Brioulou
- Castéra
- Castetber
- Chatou
- Collongues
- Couillet
- Coutet
- Cruhot
- Cussou
- Gaillat
- Gariman
- Gibardéou
- Glesia
- Gouaillard
- Higuères
- Hournas
- Jouanlanne
- Labère
- Labus
- Lacoste
- Lafitte (two places)
- Lafounta
- Lafume
- Lahon
- Lanot
- Larribaou
- Lasterrières
- Laulhé
- Lhamounet
- Licorne
- Loué
- Loustalet
- Massou
- Millet
- Nabailh
- Naude
- Ninot
- Piarrot
- Pifre
- Pigat
- Pountet
- Pouy
- Rouquet
- Roux
- Salles
- Sicut
- Sobole
- Ten
- Tristan
- Vialé

== Toponymy ==
The name Arraziguet appears in the form:

- Raviguet (1793 or Year II) and was not shown on the Cassini Map of 1750.

Michel Grosclaude indicated that the origin of the name is arrasic ("root" in Gascon), with the collective suffix -etum added giving "cluster of roots or stumps".

The name Arzacq appears in the forms:

- Arsac (1385, Census of Béarn),

Lo marcat d'Arsac (1542, Reformation of Béarn B. 736), at which time it came to Soule and Lower Navarre,

- Arzac (1620, related to a journey by Louis XIII to Pau), and
- Arzac on the Cassini Map in 1750

Its name in béarnais is Arsac. The name is of Gallo-Roman origin - the name of a former owner ("Domain of Arsius").

Cherre was a hamlet in Arzacq, mentioned by the dictionary of 1863.

The name Vialé appears in the form Le Vialé in the 1863 dictionary.

== History ==
On 14 and 15 October 1620, Louis XIII stopped in Arzacq on his way to Pau. The two aldermen of the town were then Pierre Dubern and Dominique de Meylon.

In 1790 the Canton of Arzacq comprised the same communes as today except the village of Riumayou, but including the commune of Momas.

Arraziguet was merged with Arzacq on 7 September 1845.

=== Heraldry ===
Arms of Arzacq-Arraziguet	Blazon: Gules, a greyhound courant of Or surmounted by a crescent the same, in chief Azure charged with 3 escallops of Or.

== Administration ==
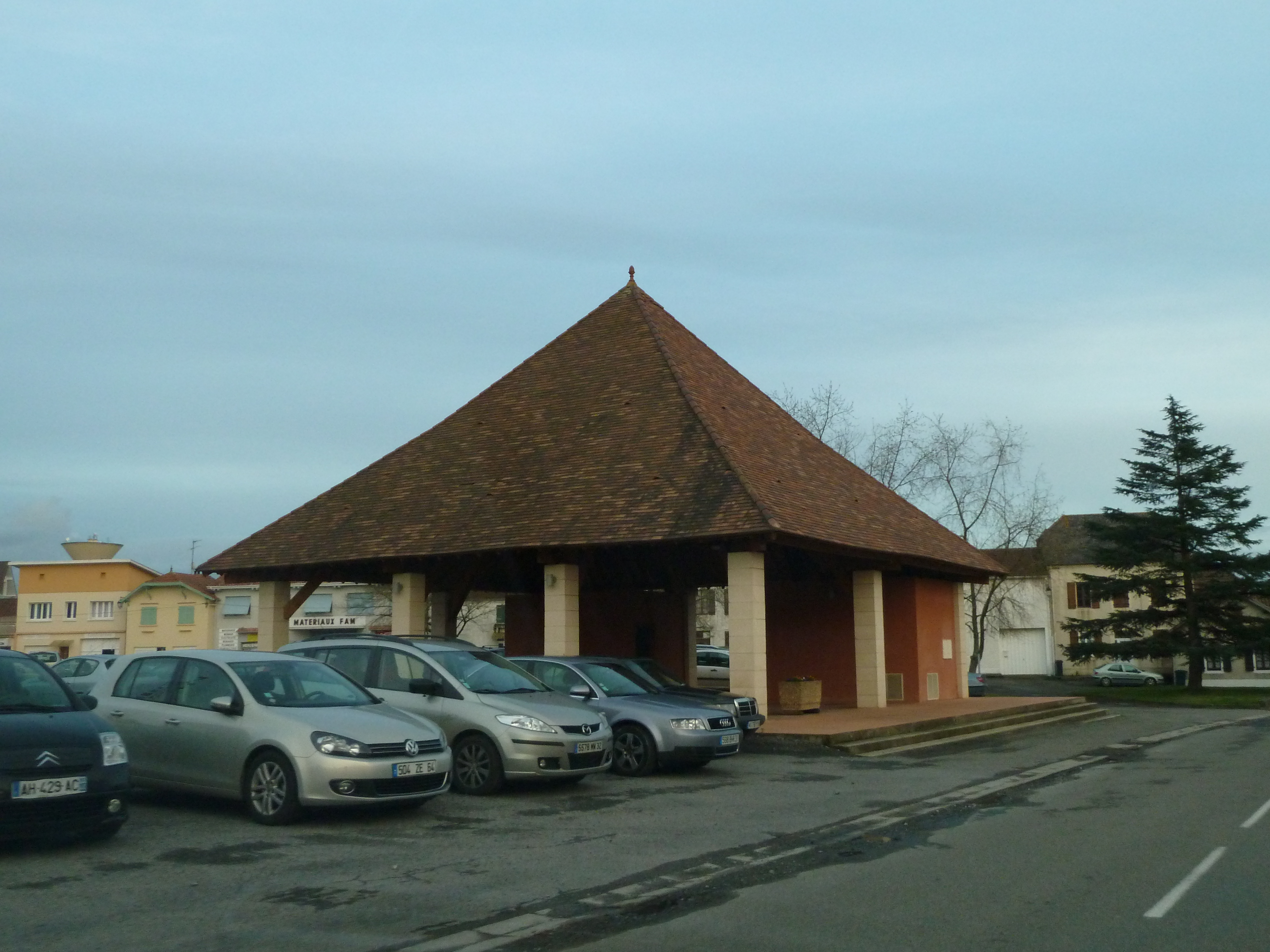
View in the town

List of Successive Mayors

From	To	Name
1995	2020	Henri Fam
2020	2026	Jean-Pierre Crabos

=== Inter-communality ===
The commune is part of three inter-communal structures:

- the Communauté de communes des Luys en Béarn;
- the AEP association of Arzacq;
- the Energy association of Pyrénées-Atlantiques;

=== Twinning ===
Arzacq-Arraziguet has twinning associations with:

- Schwarzach (Germany) since 1995.
- Luna (Spain) since 2004.

== Demography ==
The inhabitants of the commune are known as Arzacquois or Arzacquoises in French.

Historical population

Year	Pop.	±% p.a.
1793	810	—
1800	741	−1.26%
1806	1,100	+6.81%
1821	1,004	−0.61%
1831	976	−0.28%
1836	957	−0.39%
1841	1,288	+6.12%
1846	1,326	+0.58%
1851	1,346	+0.30%
1856	1,319	−0.40%
1861	1,296	−0.35%
1866	1,250	−0.72%
1872	1,224	−0.35%
1876	1,264	+0.81%
1881	1,229	−0.56%
1886	1,174	−0.91%
1891	1,143	−0.53%
1896	1,077	−1.18%
1901	1,091	+0.26%

Year	Pop.	±% p.a.
1906	1,118	+0.49%
1911	1,104	−0.25%
1921	986	−1.12%
1926	954	−0.66%
1931	959	+0.10%
1936	963	+0.08%
1946	906	−0.61%
1954	916	+0.14%
1962	958	+0.56%
1968	917	−0.73%
1975	865	−0.83%
1982	826	−0.66%
1990	807	−0.29%
1999	889	+1.08%
2007	1,002	+1.51%
2012	1,026	+0.47%
2017	1,089	+1.20%
2023	1,077	−0.18%

Source: EHESS and INSEE

== Culture and Heritage ==
=== Civil heritage ===
The Gallo-Roman period in the commune was the subject of a study by the Ministry of Culture.

There are many buildings in Arzacq-Arraziguet of many types which are registered as historical monuments. These are:

- Lavoir or Public laundry at Labère (19th century) One of the first requirements at any Bastide was an ample supply of water. The Lavoir or Public laundry at Labère is oddly located several miles from the town in the open countryside.
- Presbytery House at Place du Marcadieu (19th century)
- Mimbielle House at Place du Marcadieu (18th century)
- Post Office at Place du Marcadieu (19th century)
- House at Place du Marcadieu (18th century)
- Butchery at Place de la République (15th, 16th, & 20th centuries)
- House at Place de la République (15th, 16th, & 19th centuries)
- Cafe at Place de la République (15th, 16th, 18th, & 19th centuries)
- War Memorial (First World War)
- House at Place de la République (18th & 19th centuries)
- House at Place de la République (19th century)
- Houses and Farms
- Motte la Tourette Fortified complex (10th-14th centuries). It includes a church, an outer courtyard, a mound, a moat, and an outer wall.
- Farms dating to the 19th century:
  - Farm at Castetber,
  - Farm at Gibardéou,
  - Farm at Cruhot,
  - Farm at Salles,
  - Farm at Tristan.

The Town Hall has a painting by Paul Mirat depicting the arrival of Louis XIII at Arzacq on 14 October 1620 which is registered as an historical object.

There is a Museum of Ham in Arzacq which traces the history of Bayonne ham.

=== Religious heritage ===
The Church of Saint-Pierre (19th century) is registered as a historical monument.

The church contains many items which are registered as historical objects. These are:

- Cross: Christ on the Cross (16th century)
- Statue: Virgin and child (16th century)
- 23 Stained glass windows (19th century)
- Choir enclosure (19th century)
- Altar, Altar seating, Tabernacle (19th century)
- Group Sculpture: Virgin and child surrounded by angels (15th century)
- Baptismal fonts (18th century)
- Stoup (16th century)
- Furniture in the Church
- Furniture in the Church (Supplementary list)

Arzacq-Arraziguet is a stage on the via Podiensis (or Way of Puy), one of the modern paths on the Way of St. James from Puy-en-Velay and continues to the Roncesvalles Pass and from there to Santiago de Compostela. This is why the blazon of the town has three escallops.

=== Environmental heritage ===
The town has a lake and two marked trails, one of which is labelled sentiers d'Émilie.

== Facilities ==
Education

The commune has an elementary school and a college. Arzacq also has a training establishment and a maternal assistance clinic.

== Notable people linked to the commune ==
- Damien Catalogne, born at Arzacq in 1856 and died at Arzacq in 1934, was a French politician.
- Georges Visat, born on 2 January 1910, at Foce Di Mela (Corsica) and died on 2 February 2001 at Arzacq-Arraziguet, was an engraver, art editor, and French painter.

== See also ==
- Communes of the Pyrénées-Atlantiques department

=== External links ===
- Official commune website (in French)
- La bastide (in French)
- Arzacq-Arraziguet on Géoportail, National Geographic Institute (IGN) website (in French)
- Arzac on the 1750 Cassini Map
