= Mendic =

Mendic is a synonym for several wine grape varieties including:

- Folle Blanche
- Gouais blanc
- Graisse
