= Auriac, Pyrénées-Atlantiques =

Auriac
- Commune
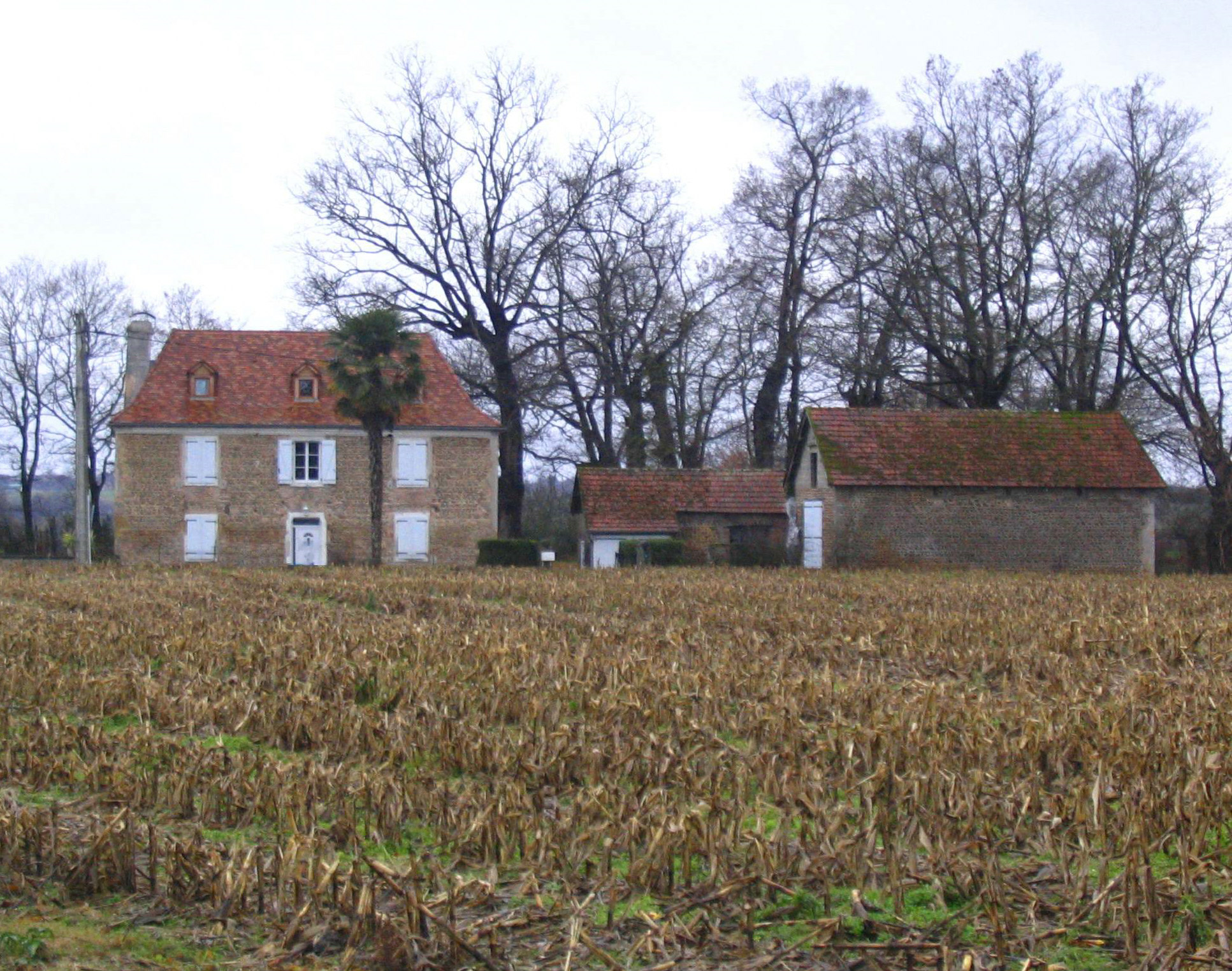
- Bearnais house in Auriac

- Coat of arms
- Location of Auriac
- Location within France Location within Nouvelle-Aquitaine
- Coordinates: 43°27′23″N 0°18′53″W
- Country: France
- Region: Nouvelle-Aquitaine
- Department: Pyrénées-Atlantiques
- Arrondissement: Pau
- Canton: Terres des Luys et Coteaux du Vic-Bilh
- Intercommunality: CC Luys Béarn

Government
  - Mayor (2020–2026): Jean-Claude Vignes
- Area^{1}: 5.23 km^{2} (2.02 sq mi)
- Elevation: 242 m (794 ft)
- Highest elevation: 250 m (820 ft)
- Lowest elevation: 145 m (476 ft)
- Population (2023): 247
  - Density: 47.2/km^{2} (122/sq mi)
- Time zone: UTC+01:00 (CET)
  - Summer (DST): UTC+02:00 (CEST)
- INSEE/Postal code: 64078 /64450
- ^{1} French Land Register data, which excludes lakes, ponds, glaciers > 1 km^{2} (0.386 sq mi or 247 acres) and river estuaries.

Auriac (French pronunciation: [oʁjak]) is a commune in the Pyrénées-Atlantiques department in the Nouvelle-Aquitaine region of south-western France.

== Geography ==
Auriac is located some 20 km north of Pau just east of Argelos. Access to the commune is by road D834 from Sarron in the north which passes through the commune and continues to Pau in the south. Access to the village is by road D944 from the village to Thèze in the north-west and the D227 from the village to Sévignacq in the south-east. The A55 autoroute passes through the north of the commune with Exit 9 just north-east of the commune giving access to road D834. The commune is mixed forest and farmland.

=== Places and hamlets ===
- Alpin
- Baix
- Bernède
- Blanc
- Calot
- Camot
- Cassagne
- Cazaudehore
- Chin
- Cournau
- Duclos
- Fam
- Hourticq
- Laborde
- Madaune
- Maribat
- Moulin de Mugain
- Mounpézat
- Pénouilh
- Périco
- Pierroulou
- Porte
- Poudgé
- Rey
- Ser (forest)

== Toponymy ==
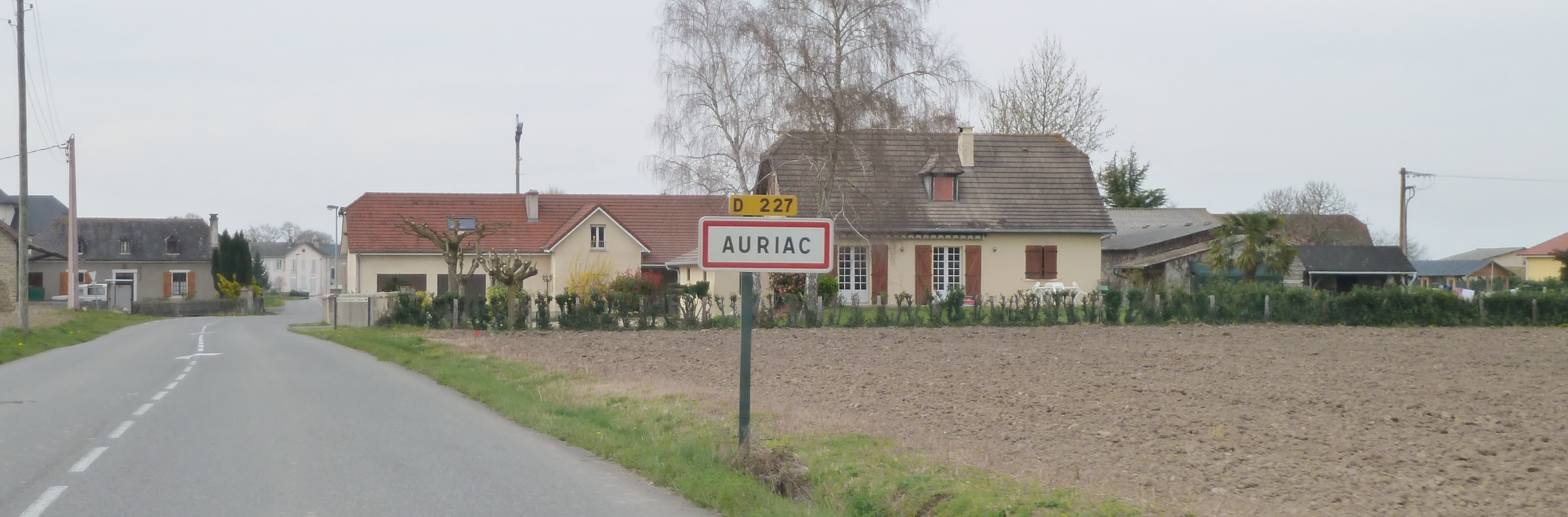
Entry to Auriac

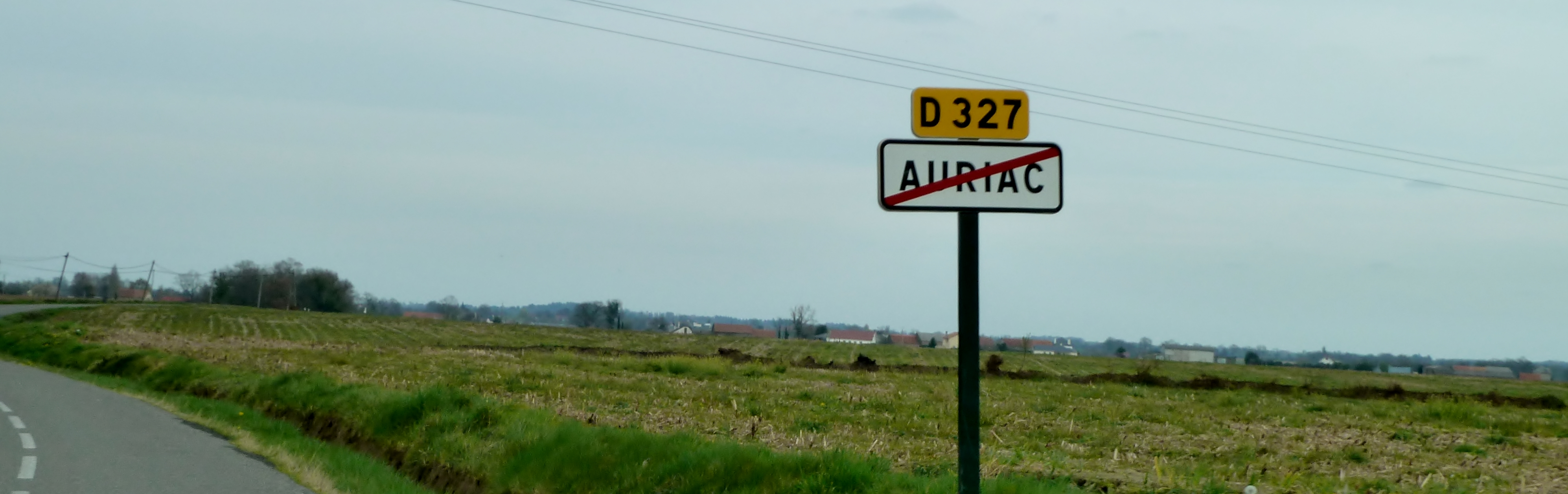
Exit from Auriac

The commune name in béarnais is Auriac. Michel Grosclaude said that the name probably comes from the Latin man's name Aurius with the Gallo-Roman suffix -acum giving "Domain of Aurius".

The following table shows the origin of the commune name:

Name	Spelling	Date	Source	Page	Origin	Description
Auriac	Auriag	1096	Raymond	17	Marka	Village
	Auriac	1750	Cassini			

Sources:

- Raymond: Topographic Dictionary of the Department of Basses-Pyrenees, 1863, on the page numbers indicated in the table. (in French)
- Grosclaude: Toponymic Dictionary of communes, Béarn, 2006 (in French)
- Cassini: Cassini Map from 1750

Origins:

- Marca: Pierre de Marca, History of Béarn.

== History ==
Paul Raymond noted that Auriac was once an annex of Argelos.

== Administration ==
List of Successive Mayors

Mayors from 1824 to 1940

From	To	Name
1824	1829	Augustin Baix
1829	1831	Jean Bertrand
1831	1836	Augustin Baix
1836	1837	Pierre Madaune
1837	1864	Pierre Julien Viguerie
1864	1899	Justin Madaune
1899	1908	Jean Philippe Madaune
1908	1911	Maurice Rey
1911	1919	André Madaune
1919	1929	Jean Soubré
1929	1939	André Madaune
1939	1940	Jean Touret

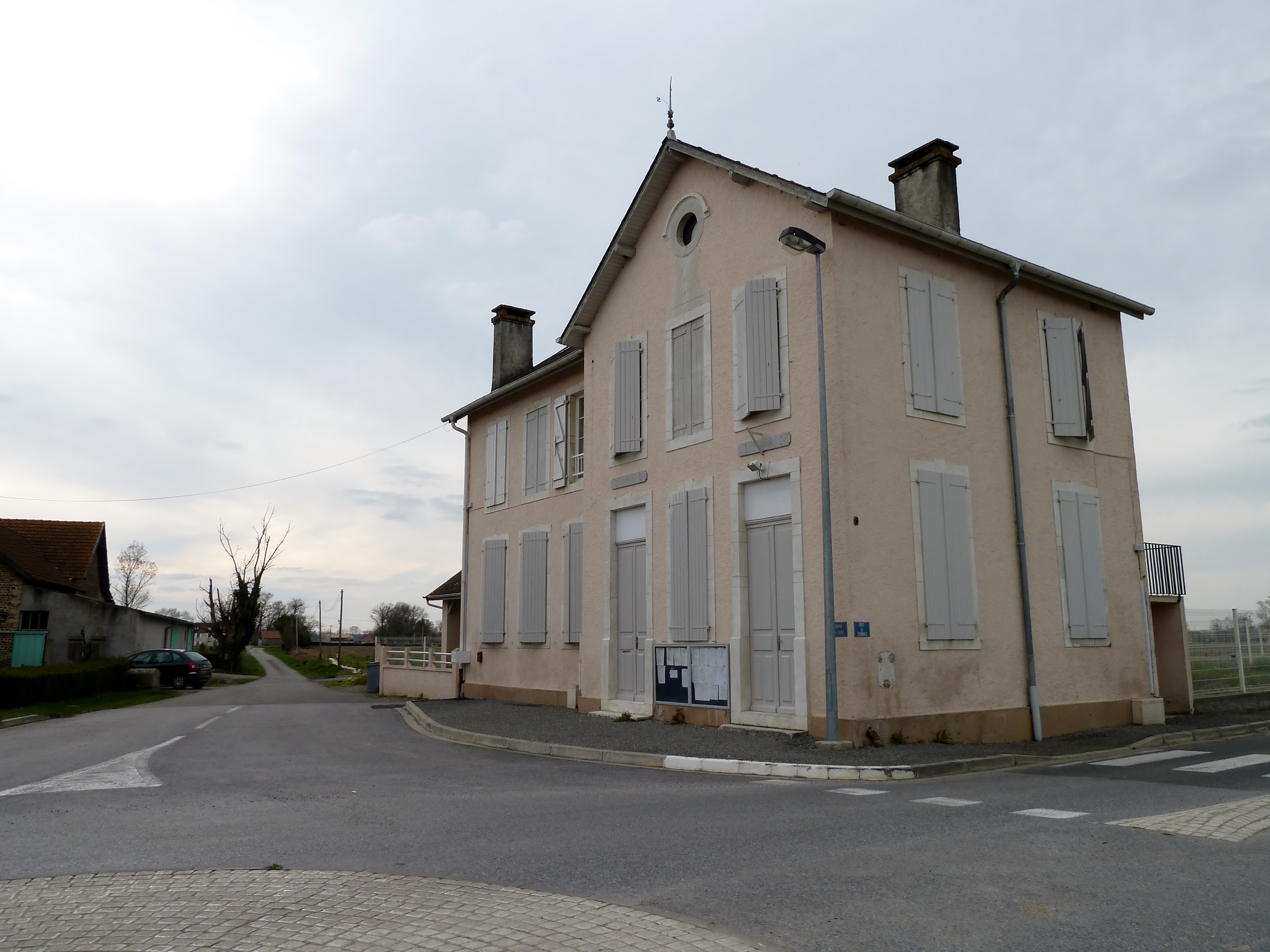
Old Town Hall

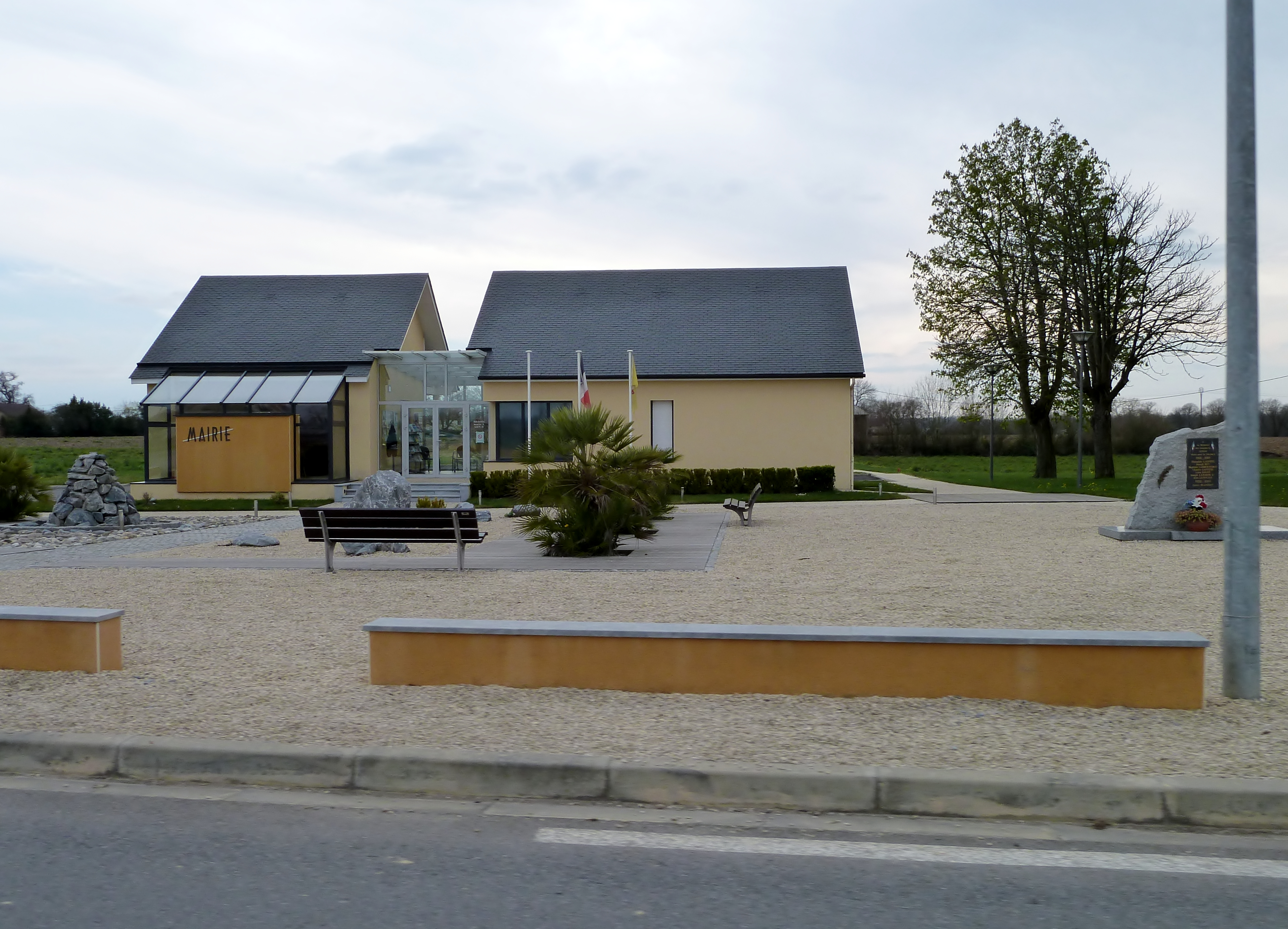
The current Town Hall

Mayors from 1940

From	To	Name
1940	1942	Jean Evrard
1942	1944	Pierre Boué-Cam
1944	1945	Joseph Soubré
1945	1948	René Rey
1948	1949	Pierre Clauzet
1949	1951	Jean Maribat
1951	1951	Joseph Soubré
1951	1953	Pierre Boué-Cam
1953	1959	René Rey
1959	1962	Pierre Clauzet
1962	1963	René Rey
1965	1971	Claude Larrieu
1971	1977	Henri Hélip
1977	1993	Marc Rey
1993	2020	Christian Larrouturou
2020	2026	Jean-Claude Vignes

=== Inter-communality ===
The commune is part of five inter-communal structures:

- the Communauté de communes des Luys en Béarn;
- the SIVU for collective sanitation Auriac-Miossens-Lanusse-Thèze
- the Energy association of Pyrénées-Atlantiques;
- the inter-communal association for the management of drinking water from the Luy-Gabas-Lées;
- the inter-communal association of Garlède-Lalonquette;

== Demography ==
The inhabitants of the commune are known as Auriacois or Auriacoises in French.

Historical population

Year	Pop.	±% p.a.
1831	317	—
1846	352	+0.70%
1872	287	−0.78%
1901	227	−0.81%
1926	176	−1.01%
1946	182	+0.17%
1962	163	−0.69%
1968	153	−1.05%

Year	Pop.	±% p.a.
1975	167	+1.26%
1982	166	−0.09%
1990	180	+1.02%
1999	209	+1.67%
2007	247	+2.11%
2012	244	−0.24%
2017	238	−0.50%
2023	247	+0.62%

Source: EHESS and INSEE

== Culture and heritage ==
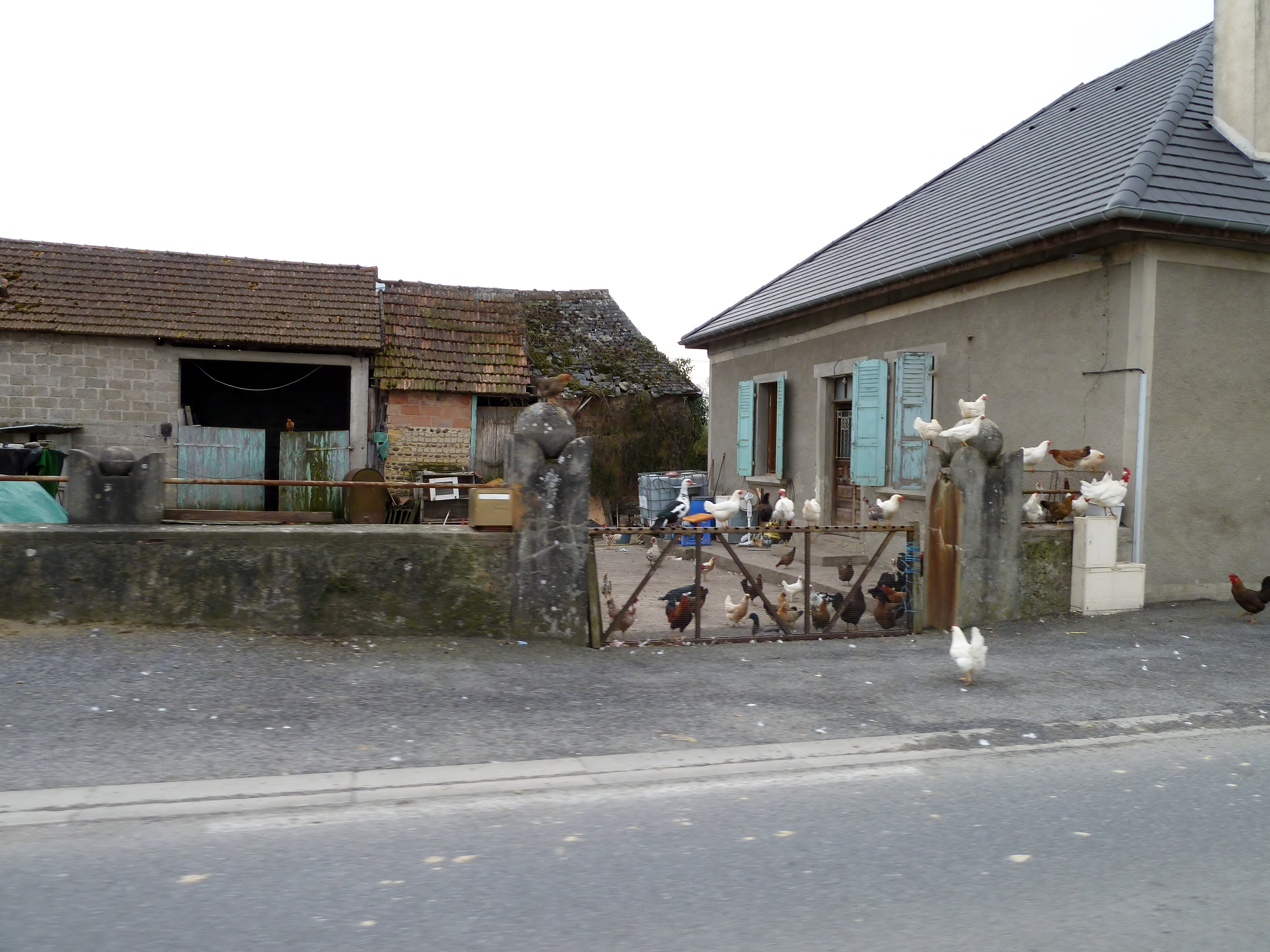
An Auriac Farmhouse

=== Civil heritage ===
The commune has a number of buildings and structures that are registered as historical monuments:

- A House at Porte (16th century)
- A House at Cazaudehore (19th century)
- Houses and Farms (16th and 19th centuries)

=== Religious heritage ===
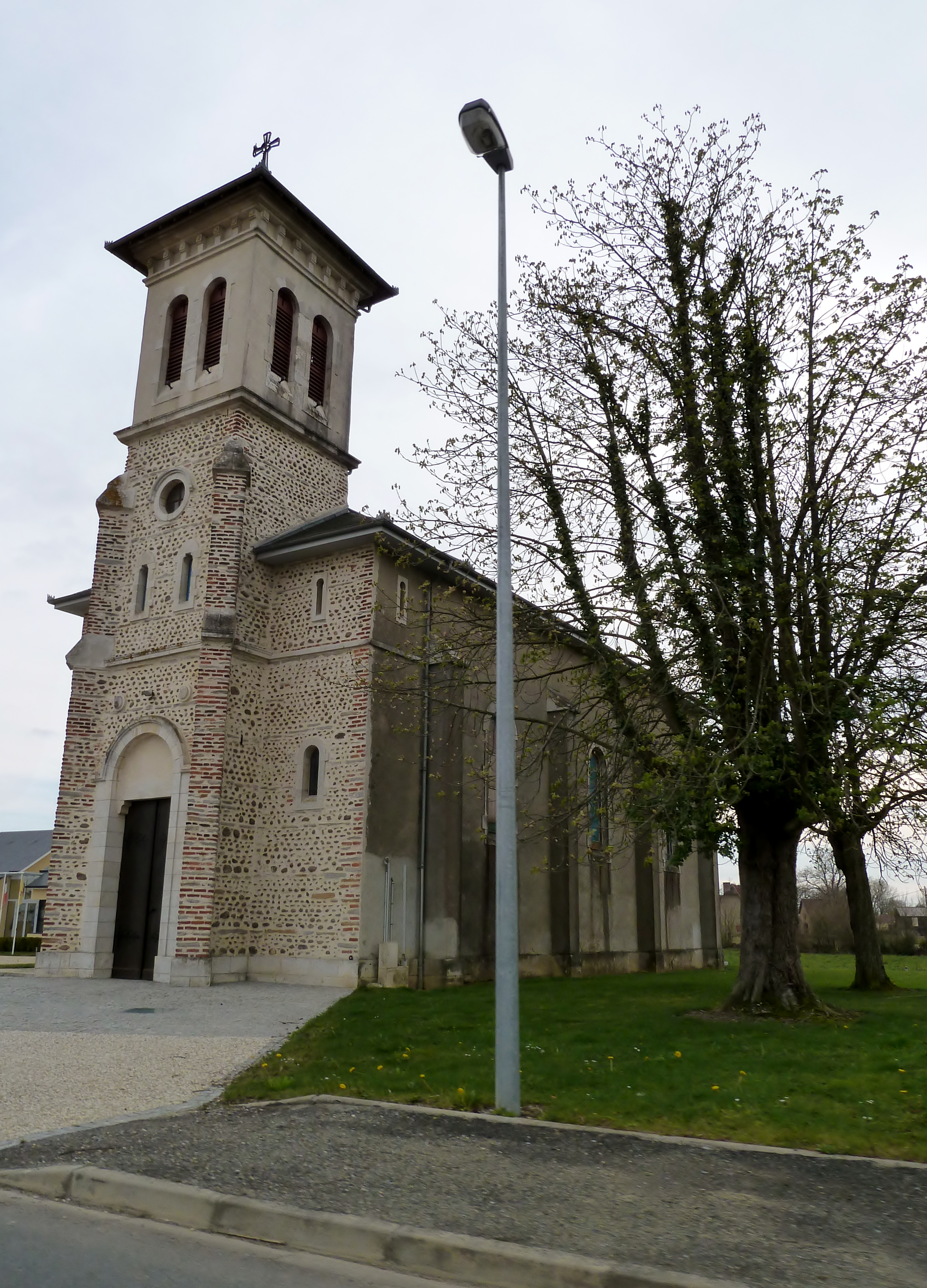
The Church of Saint-François-de-Sales

The commune has two religious buildings that are registered as historical monuments:

- The Parish Church of Saint-François-de-Sales (18th century) (destroyed)
- The Parish Church of Saint-François-de-Sales (1885). This church was built in 1885 to replace the old church of the same name which appeared on the Cassini Map. The Church contains many items that are registered as historical objects:
  - The furniture of the church
  - A Chasuble (18th century)
  - A Sun-ray Monstrance (19th century)
  - 2 Altar Candlesticks (19th century)
  - A Chalice (19th century)
  - A Prie-dieu (19th century)
  - A Stoup (19th century)
  - 2 Altars, 4 altar seatings, and 2 Tabernacles (1885)
  - An Altar, 2 altar seatings, a Tabernacle, and 2 Statues (1885)
  - 3 Stained glass windows of people: Saint Francis de Sales, Saint Michael protecting a canon, and Saint John (1887)

== Facilities ==
Auriac has a primary school which also serves the communes of Garlède-Mondebat, Lalonquette et Miossens-Lanusse in an Educational Inter-communal Grouping.

== See also ==
- Communes of the Pyrénées-Atlantiques department
