= Louts =

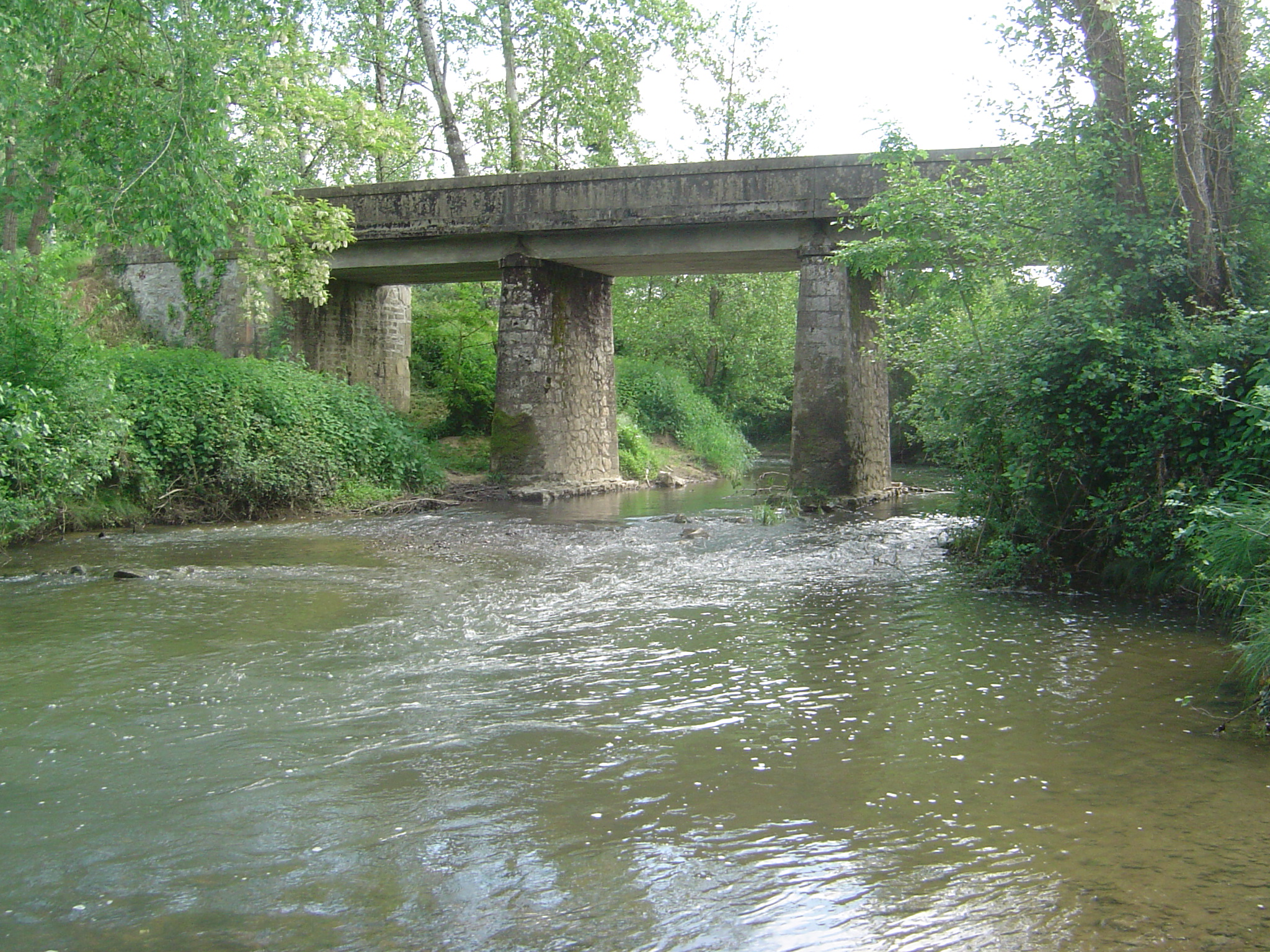

- Location within France Location within Nouvelle-Aquitaine

Location
- Country: France

Physical characteristics
- Source
  - location: North of Pau
- Mouth
  - location: Adour
  - coordinates: 43°44′27″N 0°56′1″W
- Length: 86 km (53 mi)

Basin features
- Progression: Adour→ Atlantic Ocean

The Louts (French pronunciation: [luts]; Occitan: Lots) is a left tributary of the Adour, in Nouvelle-Aquitaine, in the Southwest of France. It is 85.7 km (53.3 mi) long.

== Name ==
It is documented in medieval Latin as Fluvius qui dicitur Lossium.

== Geography ==
The Louts rises in Thèze, flows northwest through Chalosse and joins the Adour, in Hinx.

== Départements and towns ==
- Pyrénées-Atlantiques : Thèze, Arzacq-Arraziguet, Lème, Méracq, Vignes.
- Landes : Hagetmau, Saint-Cricq-Chalosse, Caupenne.
