= Claverie =

Variety of grape

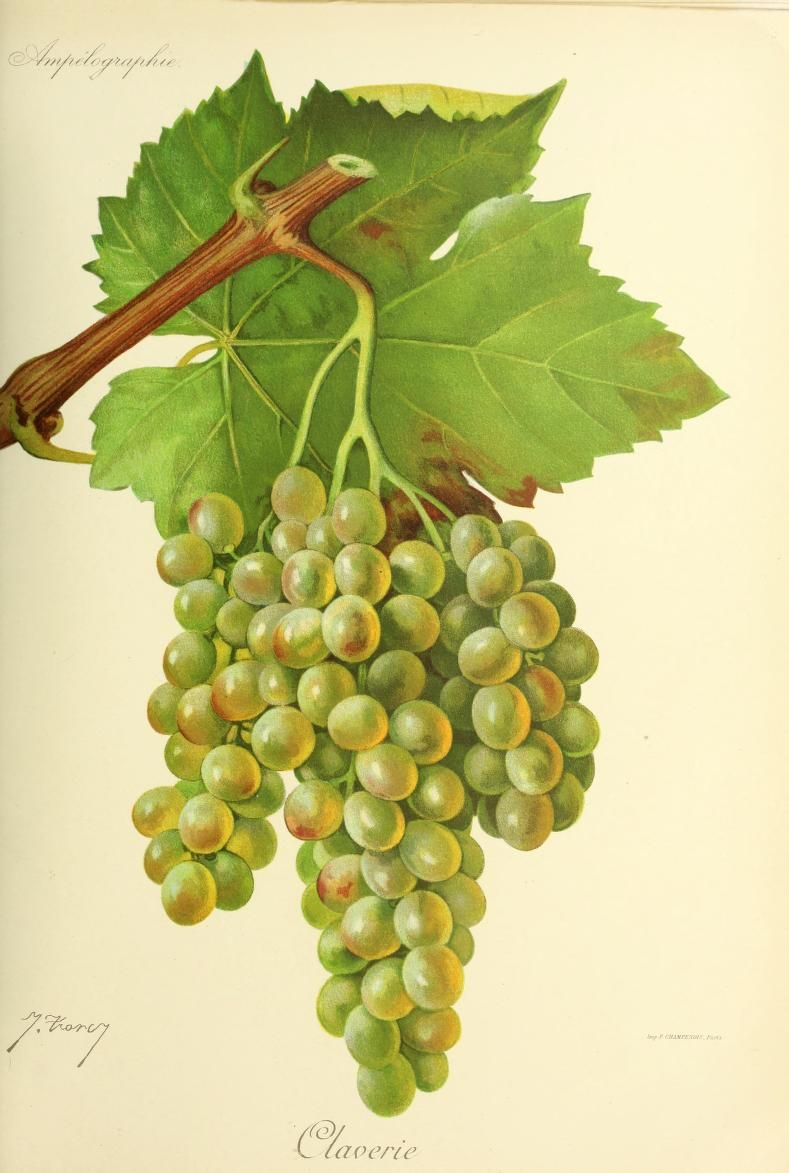
Illustration of Claverie grapes by Jules Troncy

Claverie is a white French wine grape variety that was once widely planted in the Landes region by Dutch traders who prized the variety's ability to produce wines with high alcohol levels. Today the variety exists in small isolated plantings in Southwest France and is nearing extinction.

== Synonyms ==
Various synonyms have been used to describe Claverie and its wines including Bouguieu, Chalosse Blanche, Chaloussenc, Clabarien, Clabérieu, Clabéria, Claverie Blanc and Claverie vert.
