= Chalosse Noire =

Chalosse Noire is a synonym for several wine grapes including:

- Béquignol noir
- Canari noir
- Jurançon
- Négrette
