= Graisse =

Variety of grape

Graisse (French pronunciation: [ɡʁɛs]) is a white French wine grape variety that is grown primarily in the Armagnac region of western France where the grape is used for both wine production and distillation. The pulp of the grape is characterized by its high viscosity levels, which can create some difficulties in winemaking, to produce a wine that expert Jancis Robinson describes as being of average to low quality. In recent years, plantings of Graisse have been steadily declining.

== Synonyms ==
Various synonyms have been used to describe Graisse and its wines including Blanquette, Blanquette grise, Cargo saoumo, Cargo saumo, Chalosse, Cholosse, Clairette égreneuse, Cotiblanc, Cotilblanc, Gras, Gras blanc, Grecho, Gros blanc, Jalosse, Mendic, Plant de graisse, Plant de Grecho, Plant de Mun, Président, Ramassaou blanc, Ramassou blanc, Taloche, Tizourine bou-aferara blanc and Tizourine bou-afrara.
