= Thèze, Pyrénées-Atlantiques =

Thèze
- Commune
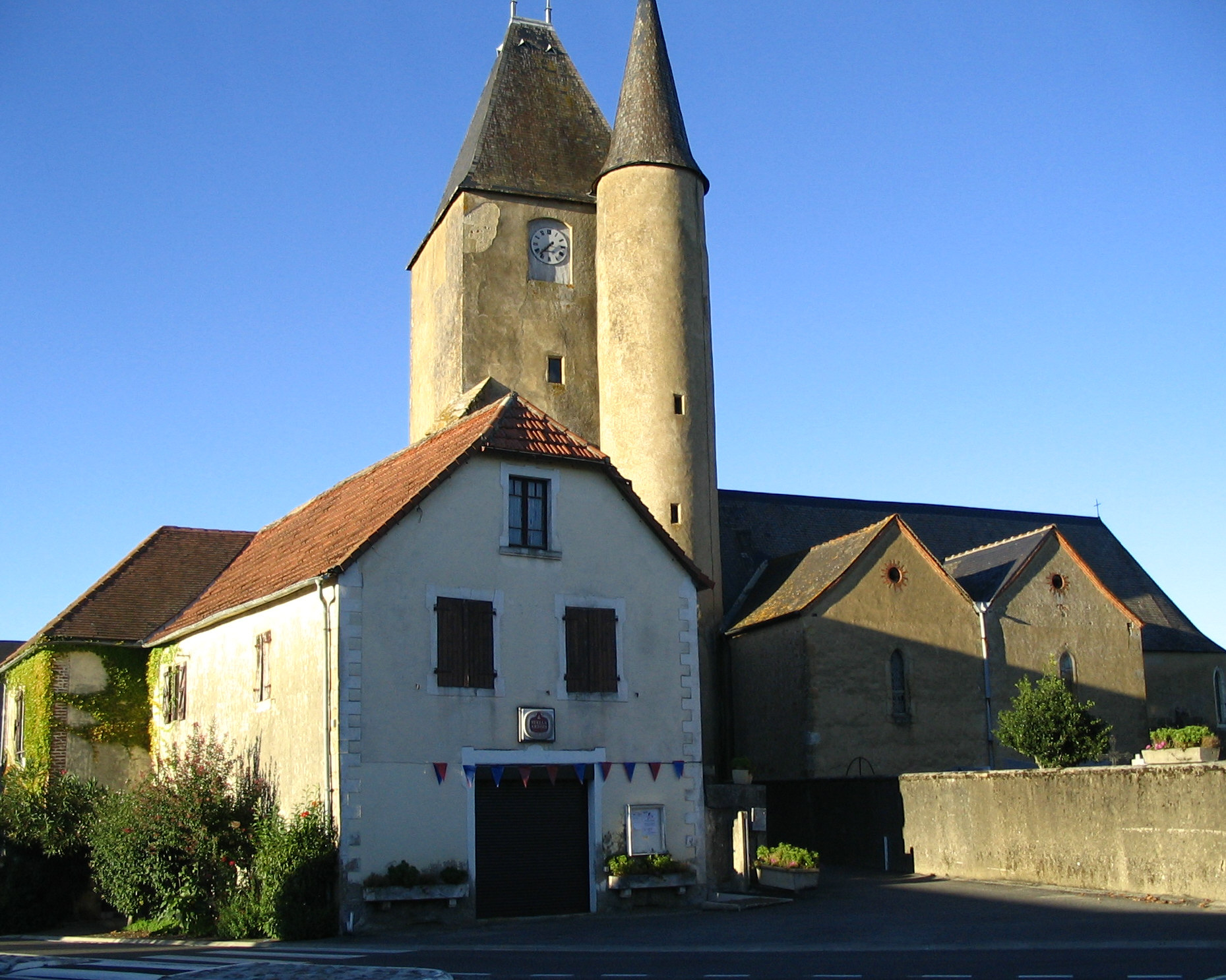
- Church

- Coat of arms
- Location of Thèze
- Location within France Location within Nouvelle-Aquitaine
- Coordinates: 43°28′39″N 0°20′52″W
- Country: France
- Region: Nouvelle-Aquitaine
- Department: Pyrénées-Atlantiques
- Arrondissement: Pau
- Canton: Terres des Luys et Coteaux du Vic-Bilh
- Intercommunality: Luys en Béarn

Government
  - Mayor (2020–2026): David Duizidou
- Area^{1}: 7.93 km^{2} (3.06 sq mi)
- Elevation: 225 m (738 ft)
- Highest elevation: 259 m (850 ft)
- Lowest elevation: 133 m (436 ft)
- Population (2023): 898
  - Density: 113/km^{2} (293/sq mi)
- Time zone: UTC+01:00 (CET)
  - Summer (DST): UTC+02:00 (CEST)
- INSEE/Postal code: 64536 /64450
- ^{1} French Land Register data, which excludes lakes, ponds, glaciers > 1 km^{2} (0.386 sq mi or 247 acres) and river estuaries.

Thèze (French pronunciation: [tɛz]; Occitan: Tèsa) is a commune in the Pyrénées-Atlantiques department in south-western France.

== See also ==
- Communes of the Pyrénées-Atlantiques department
