= Cuisine of Liguria =

Culinary traditions of Liguria

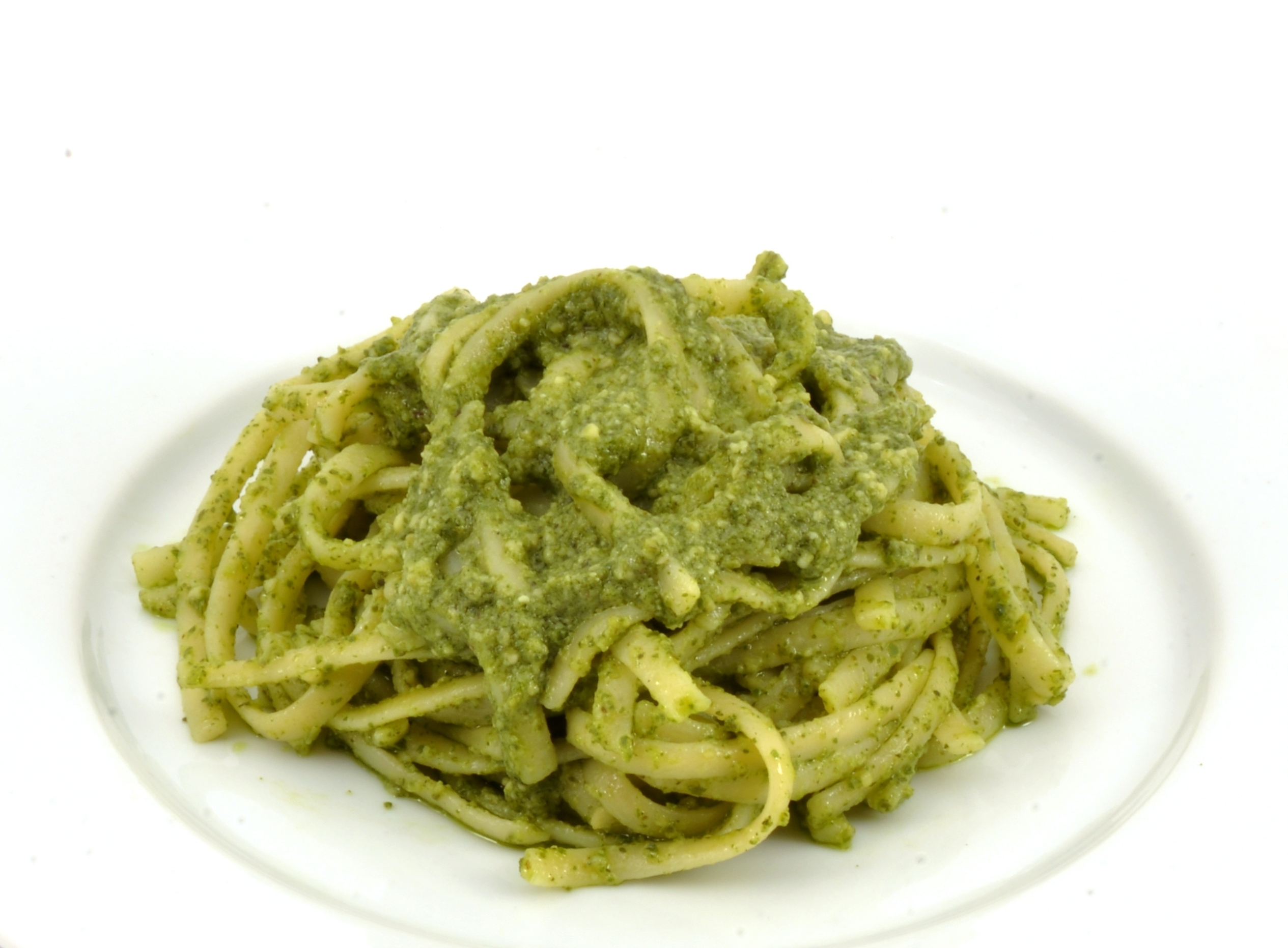
Linguine with pesto

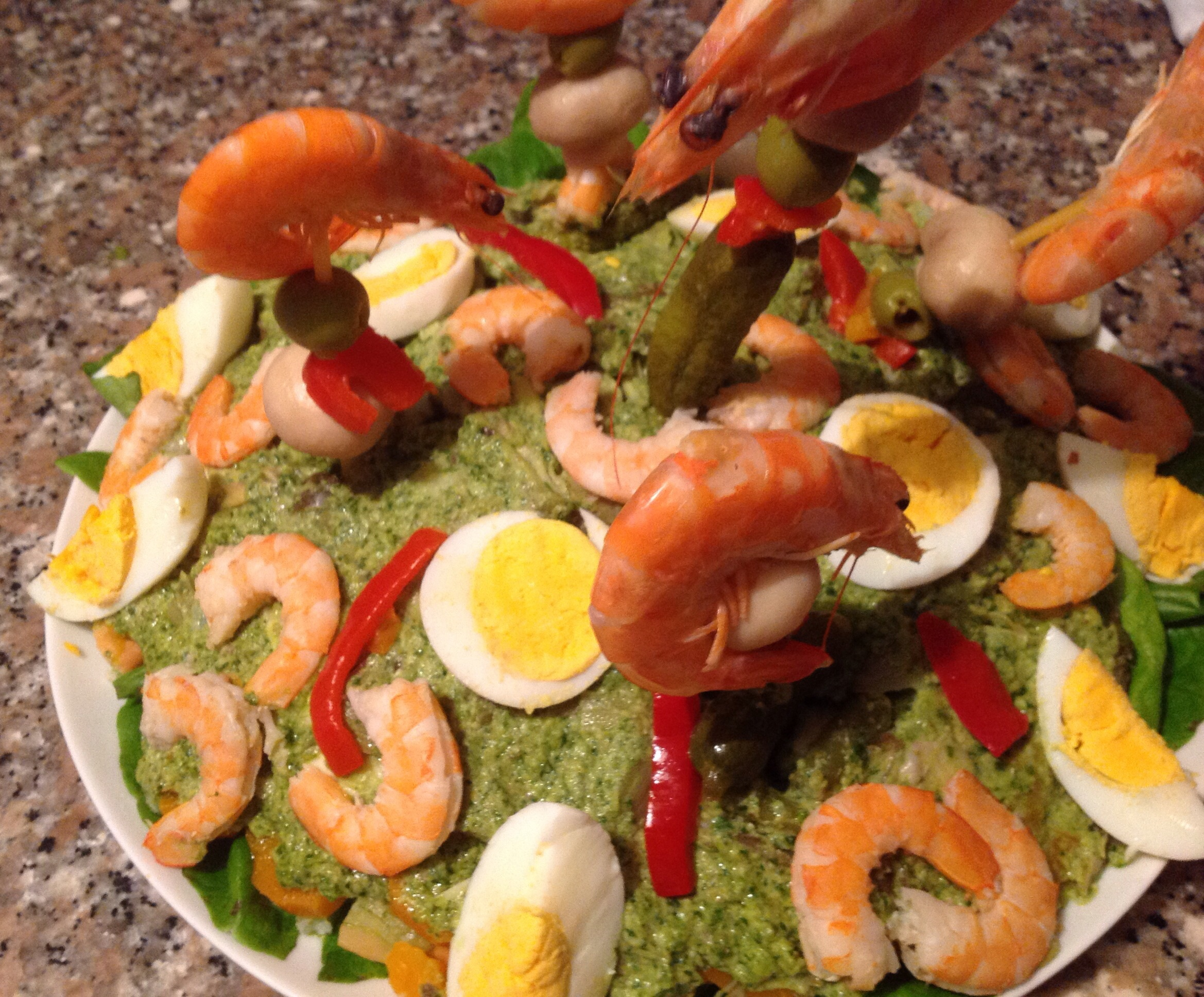
Cappon magro

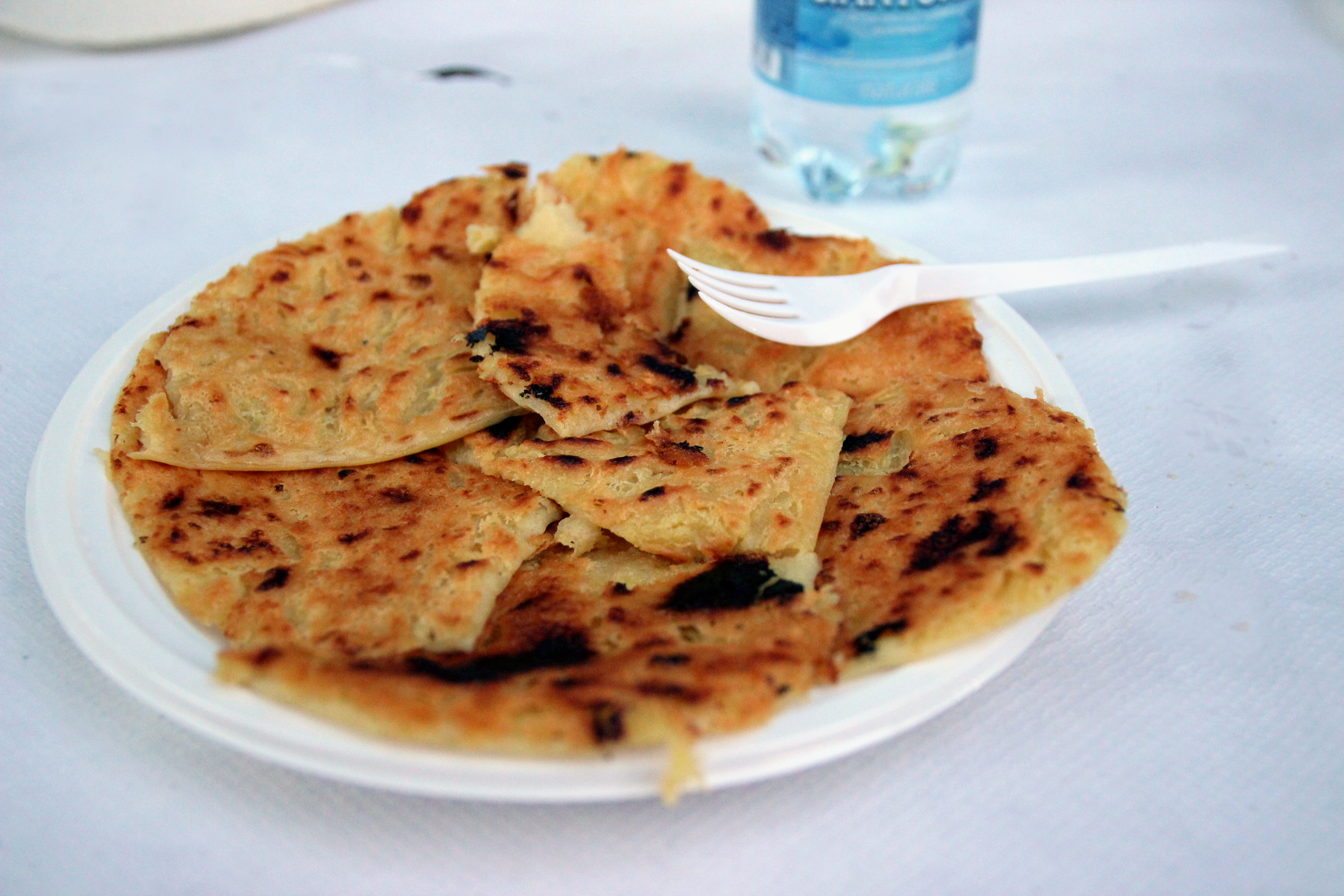
Farinata di ceci

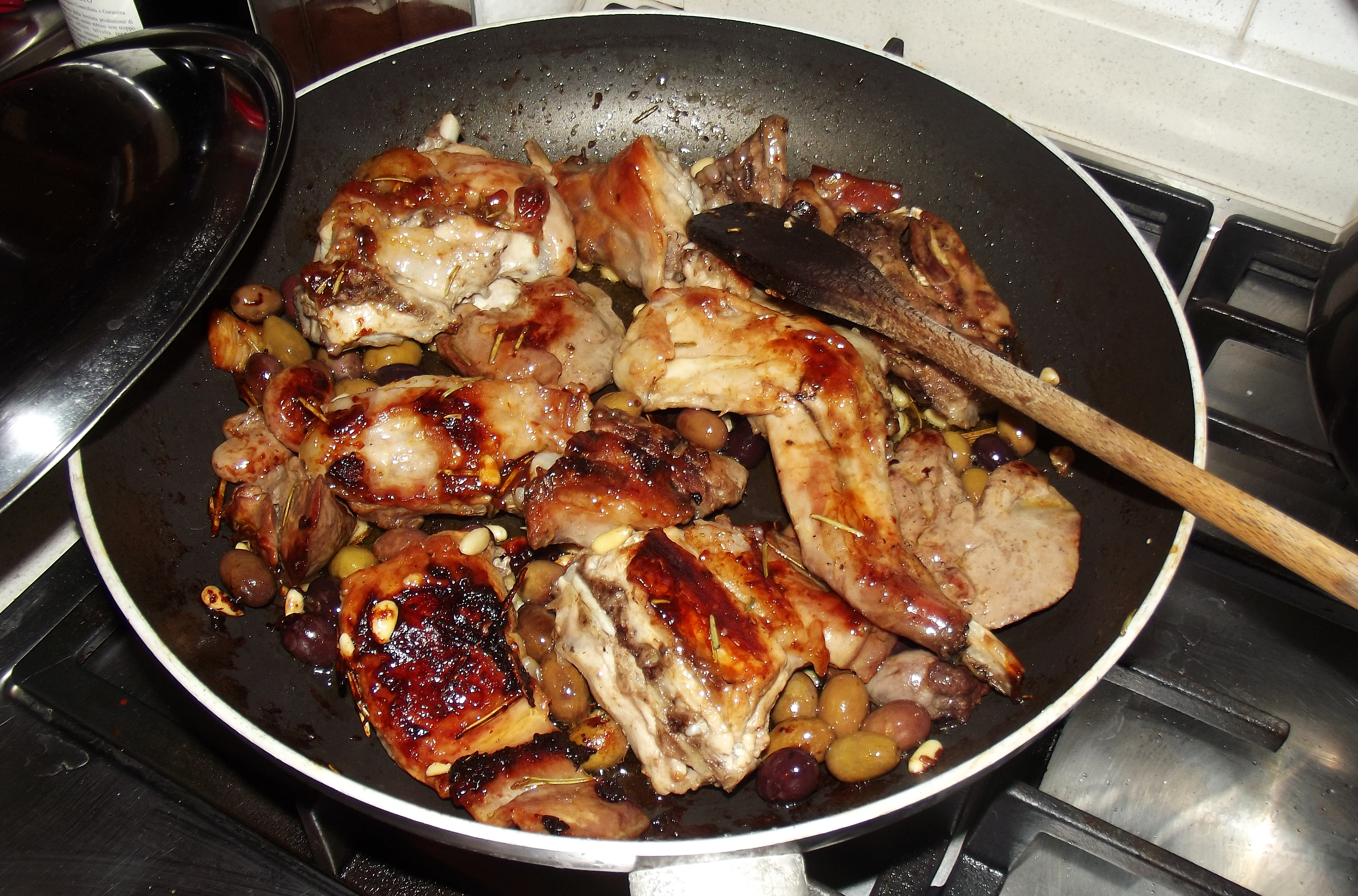
Coniglio alla ligure (with olives and pine nuts)

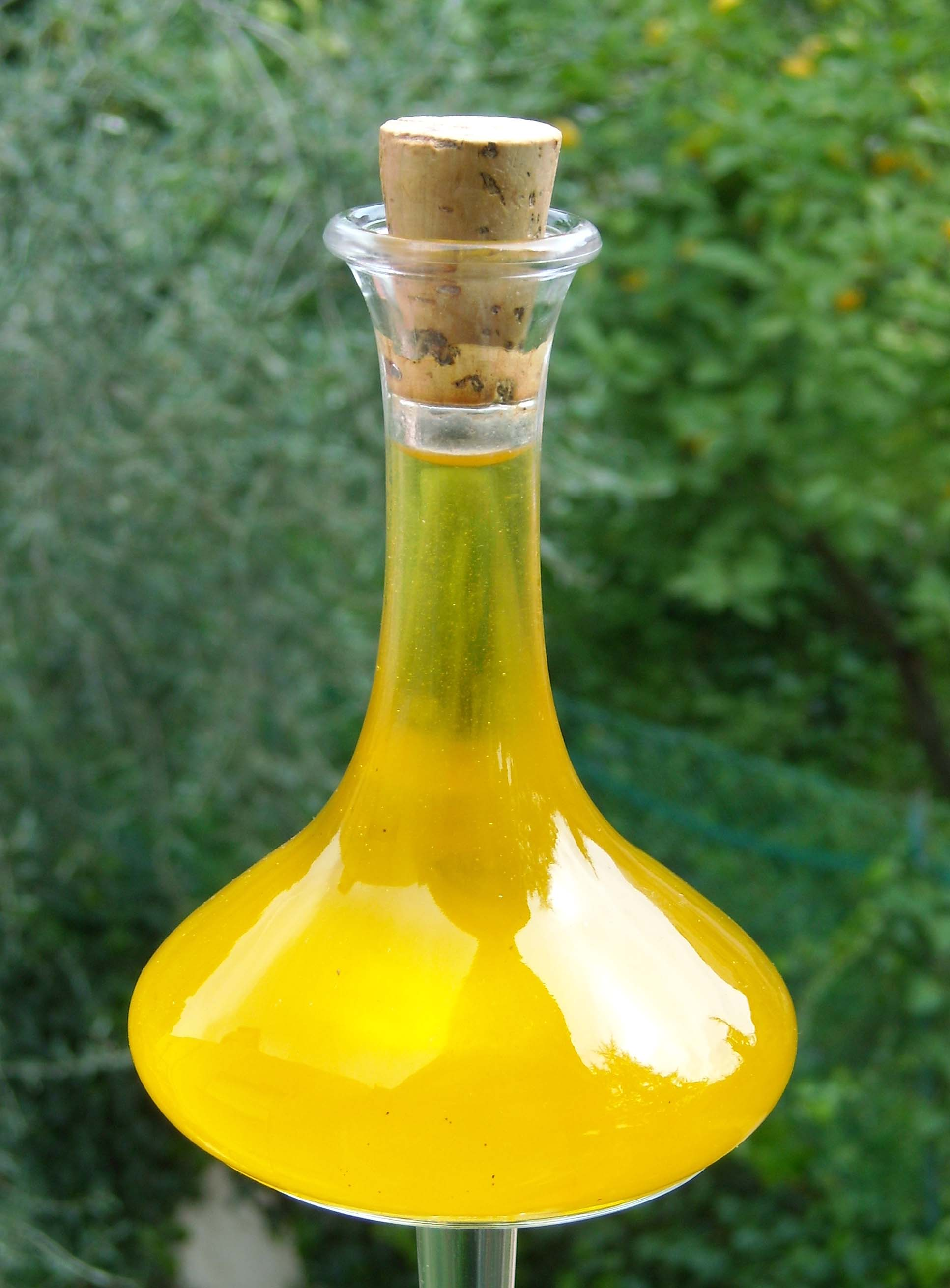
Olive oil of the Italian Riviera

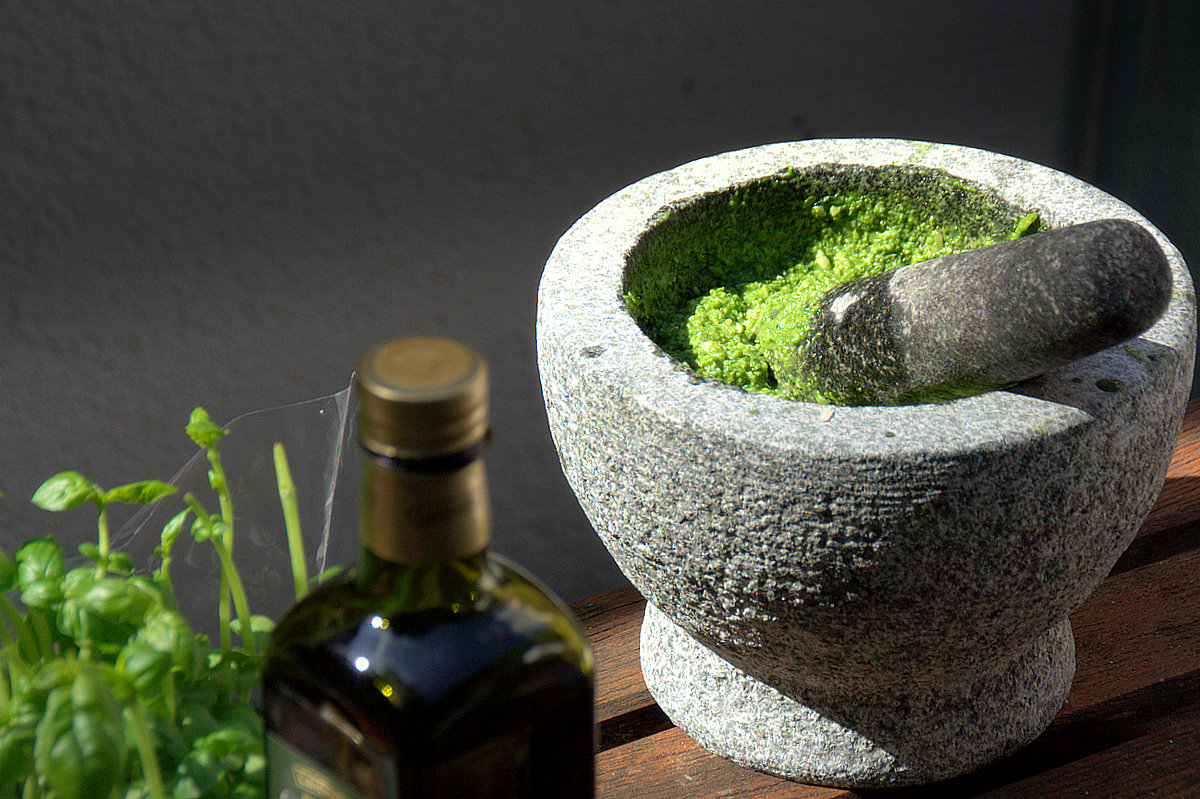
Pesto

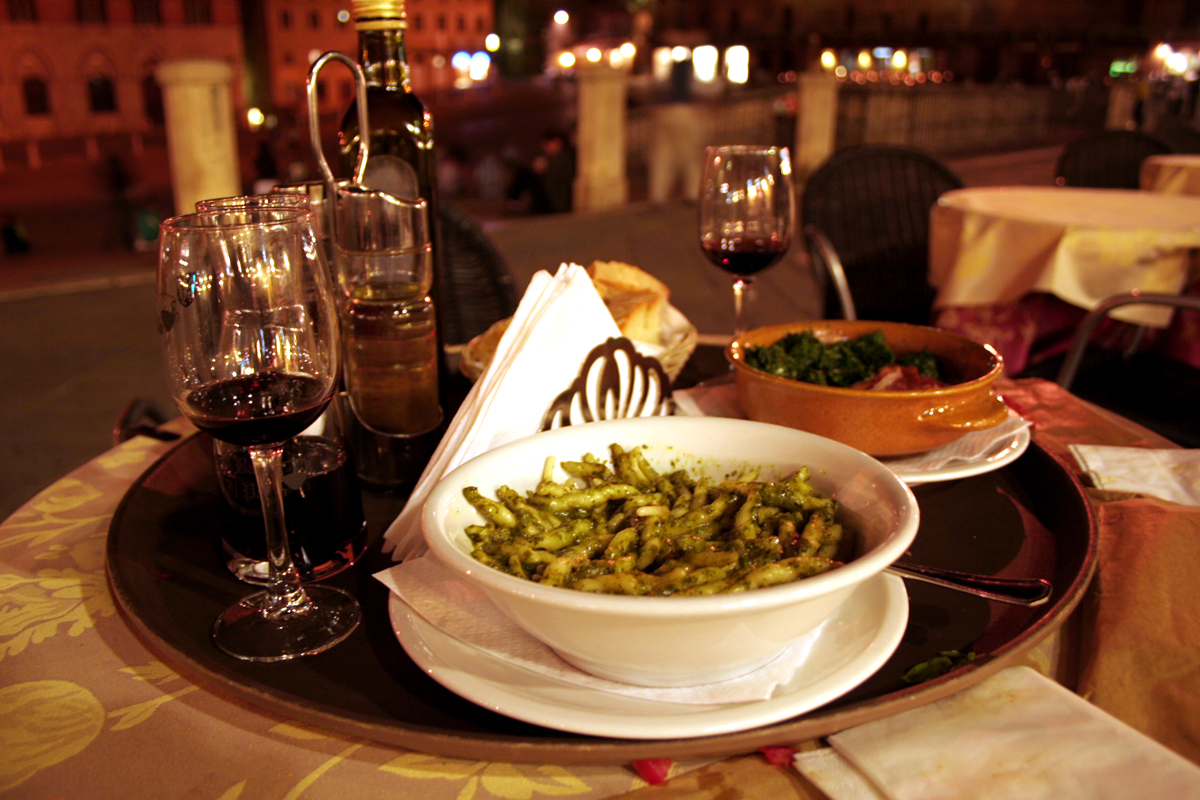
Trofie with pesto

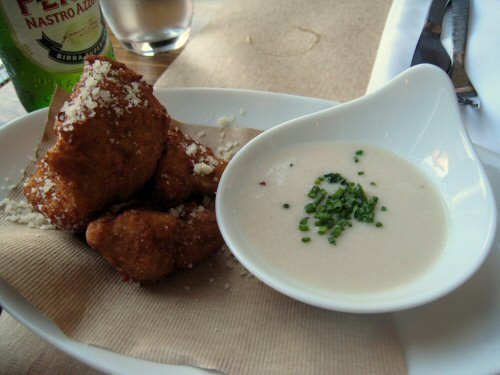
Agliata with cauliflower

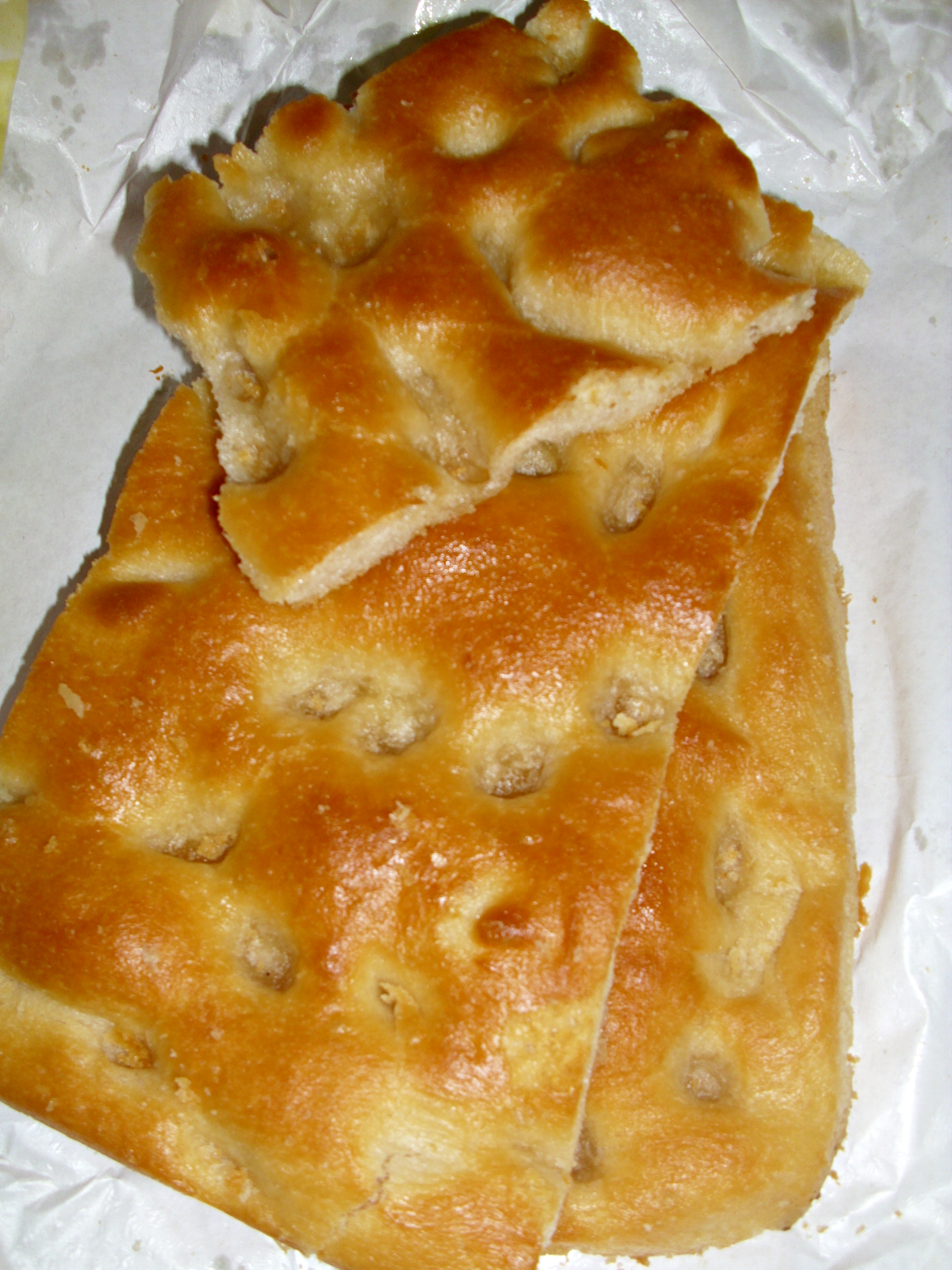
Focaccia alla genovese

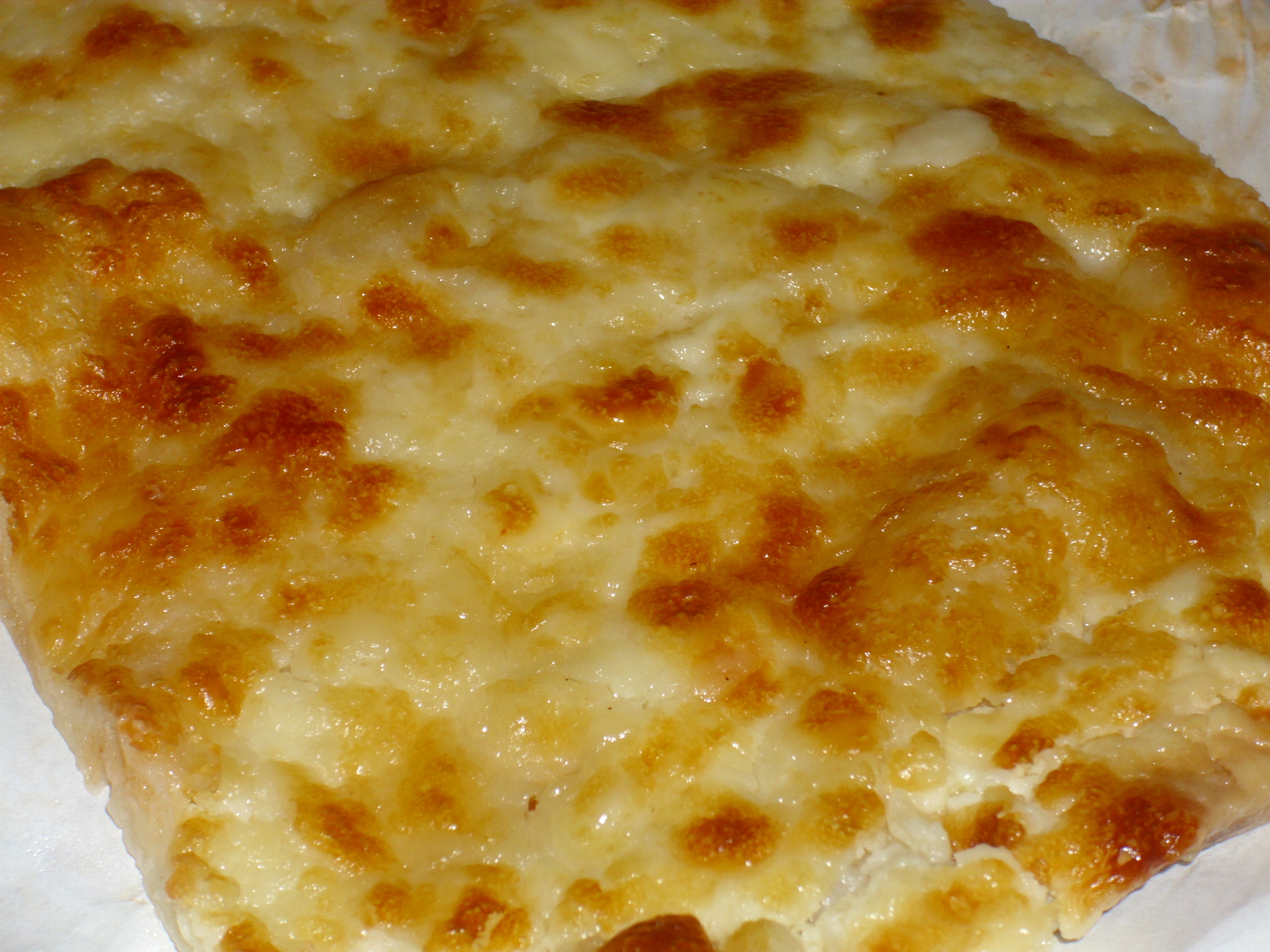
Focaccia al formaggio

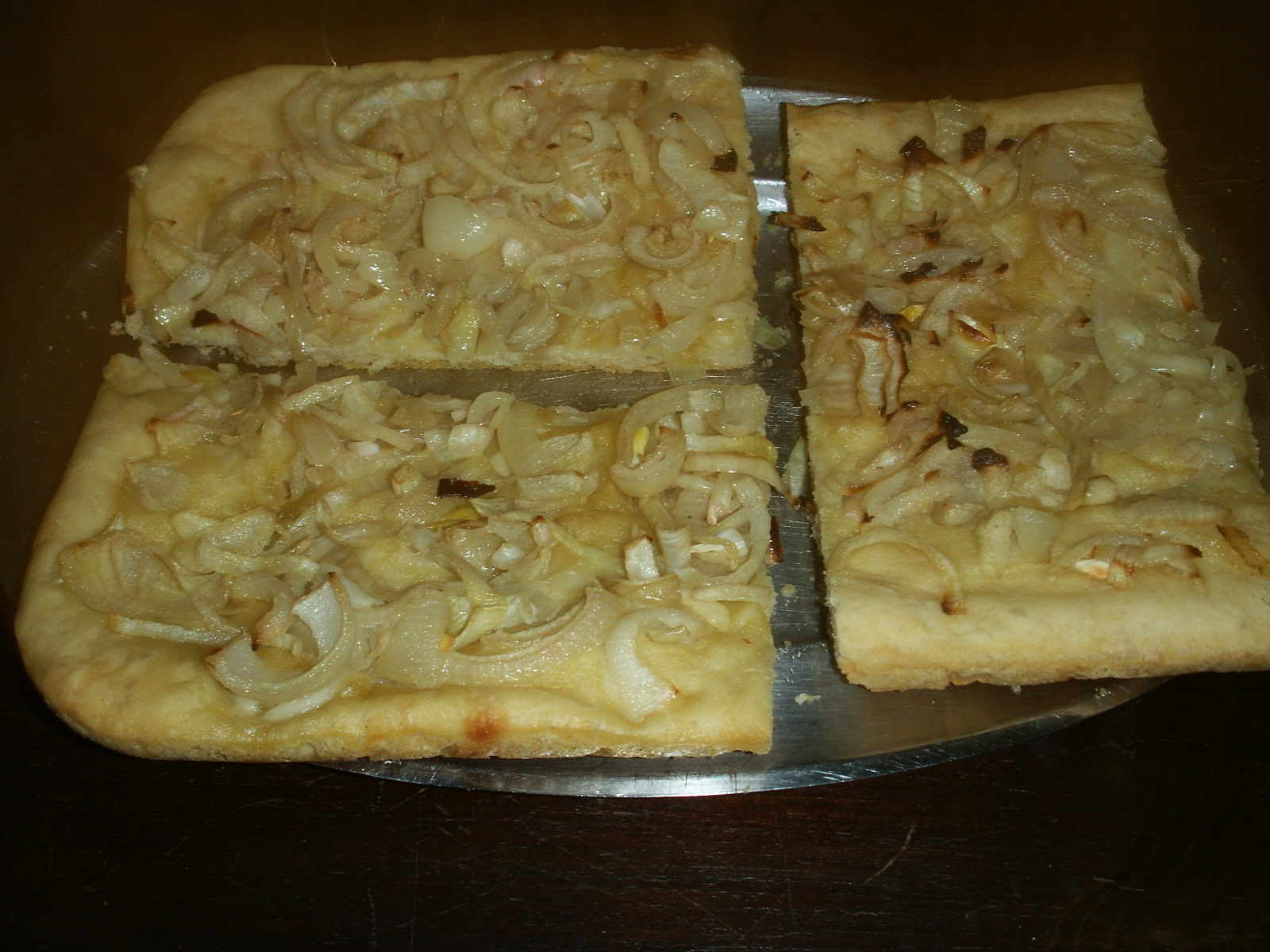
Focaccia con le cipolle

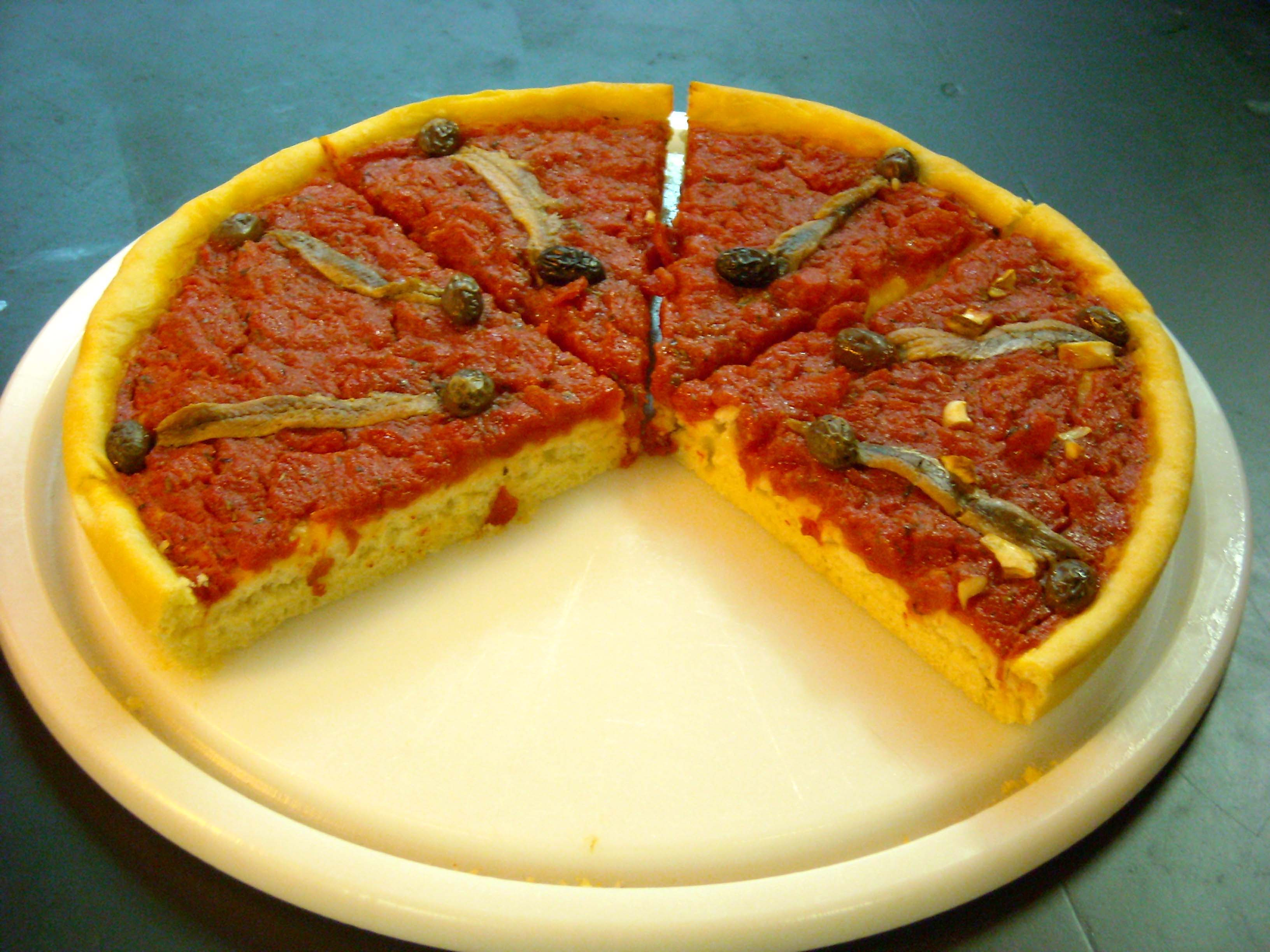
Pissaladière

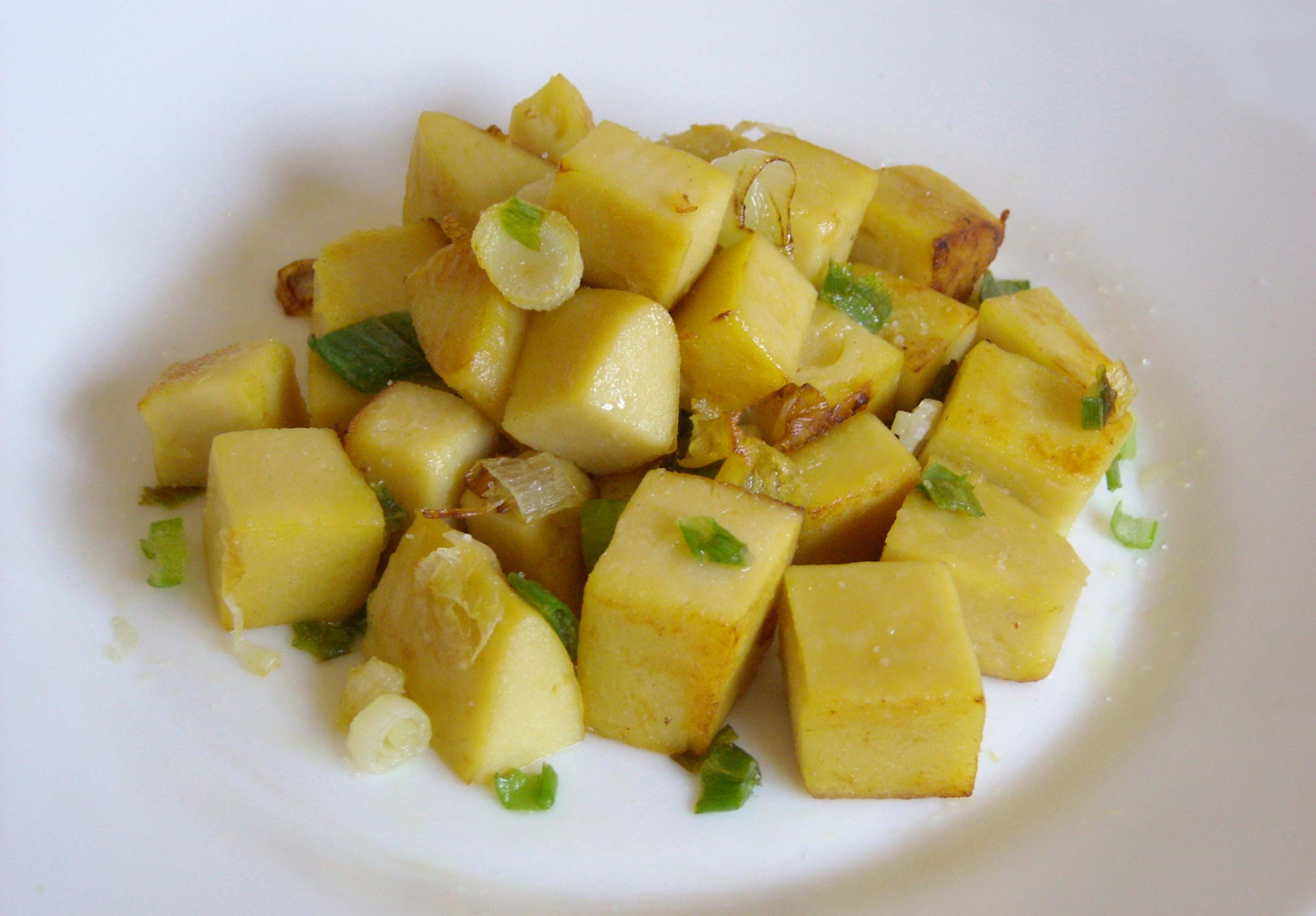
Panissa

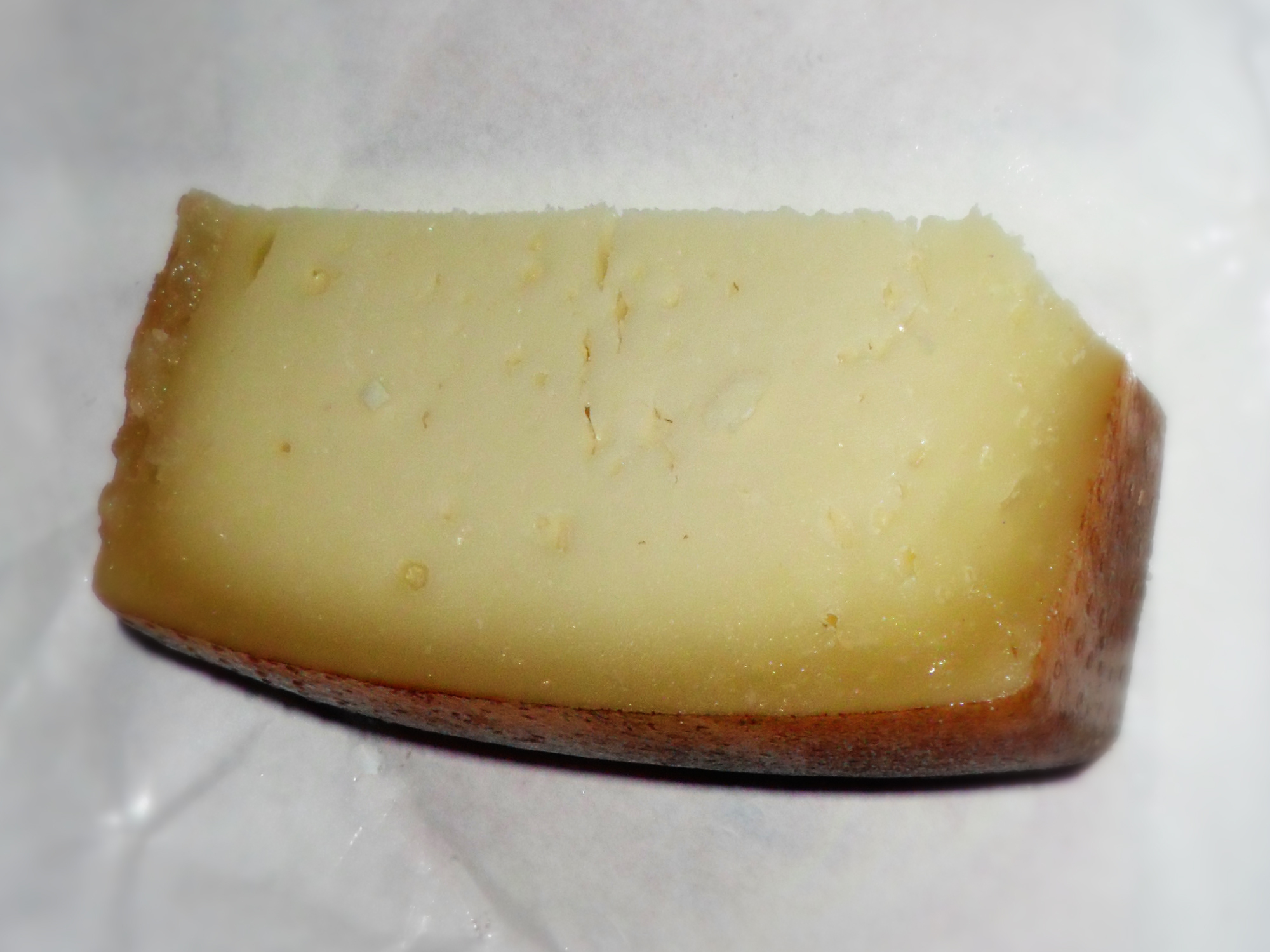
Caprino cheese

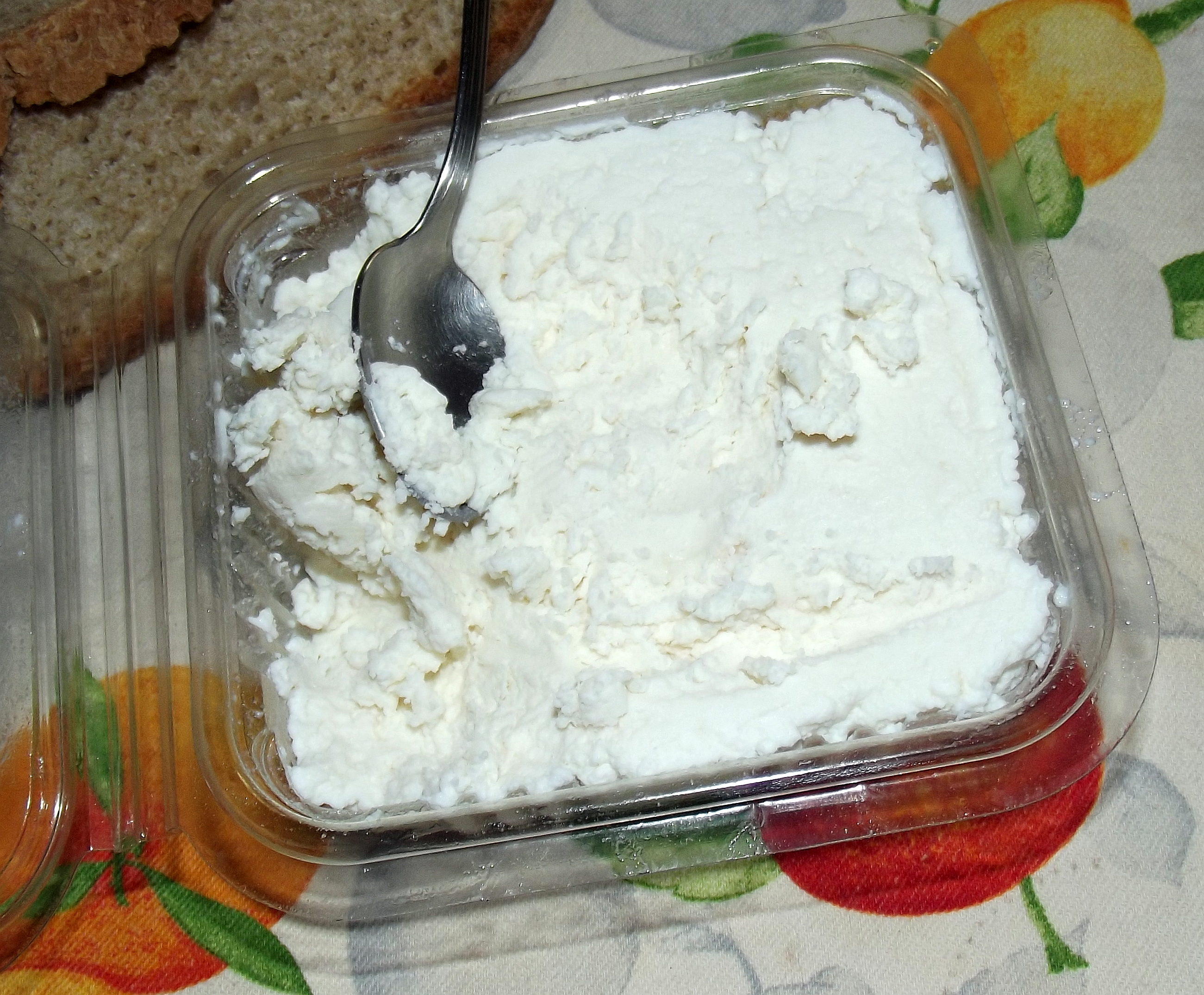
Brös is a Piedmontese and Ligurian preparation of cheese and grappa which, in former centuries, was typical of the peasant cuisine of the Upper Langa and West Liguria.

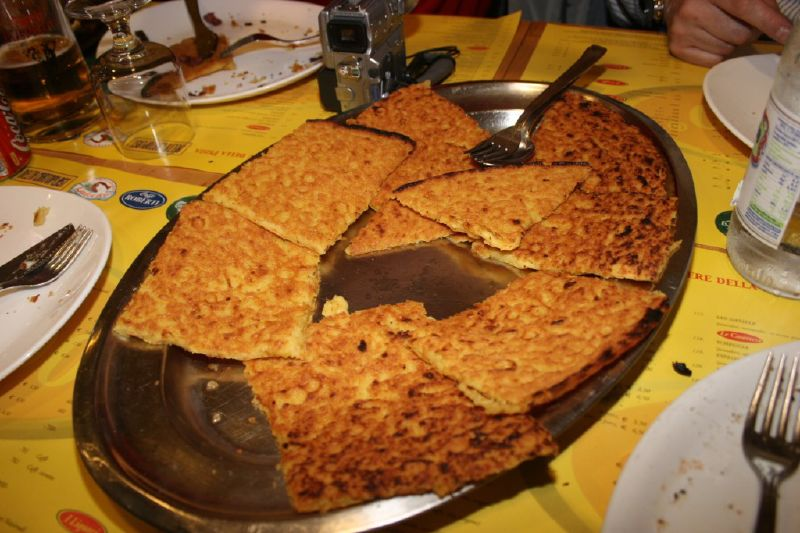
Farinata

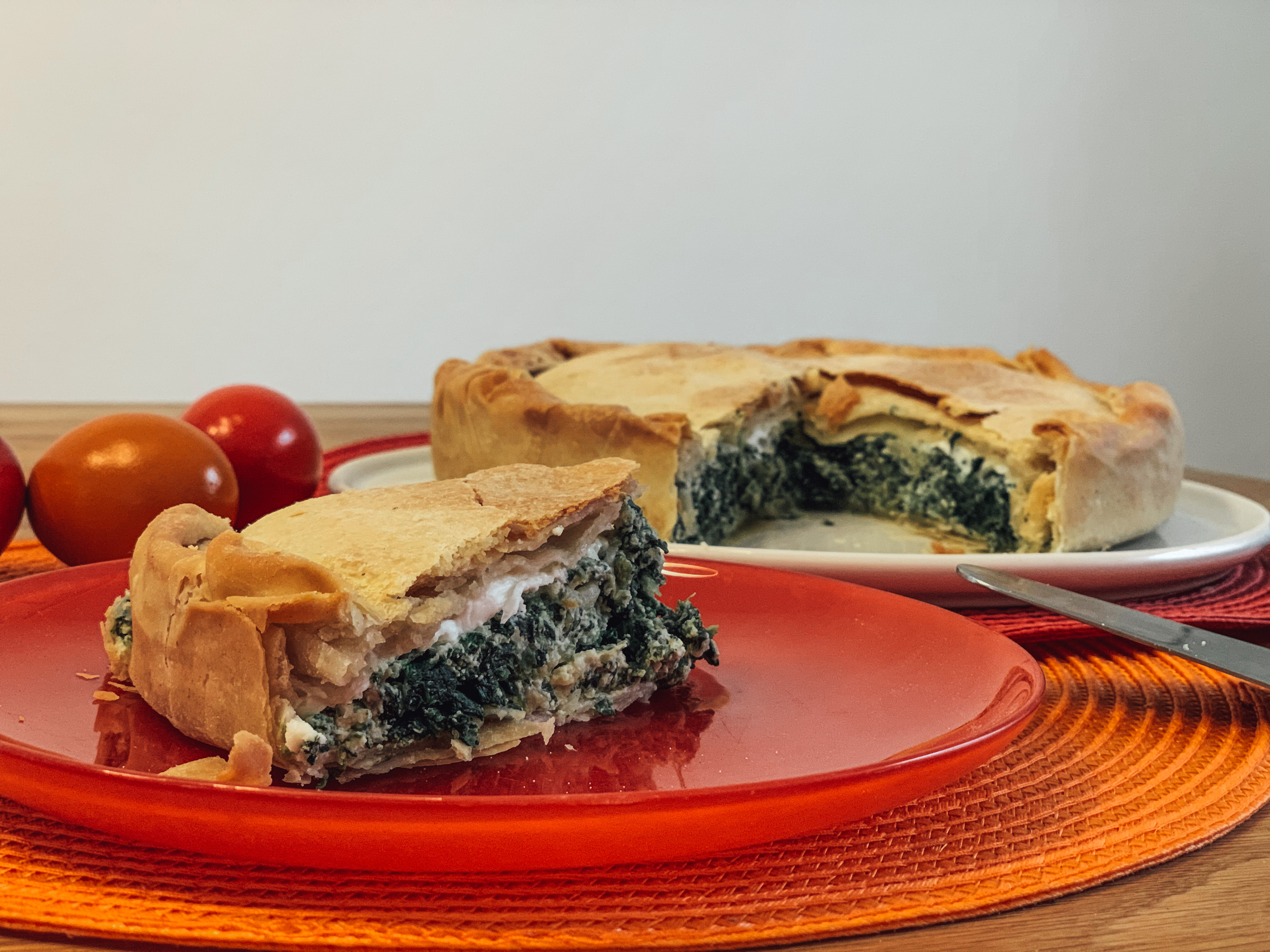
Torta pasqualina

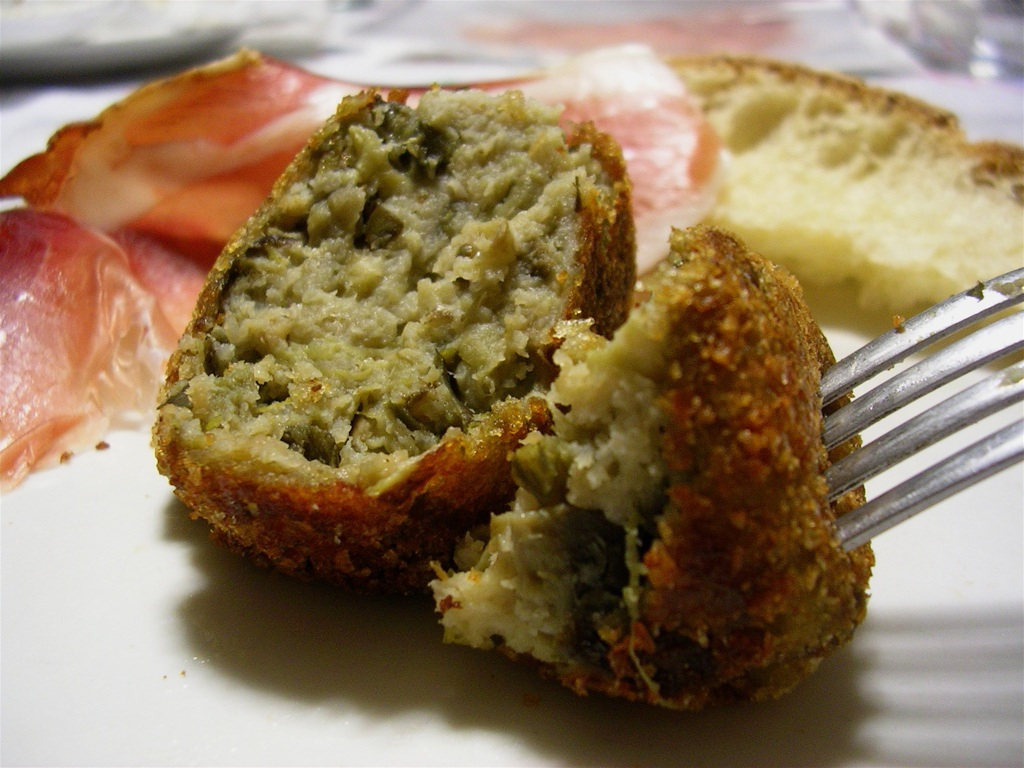
Polpette di melanzane

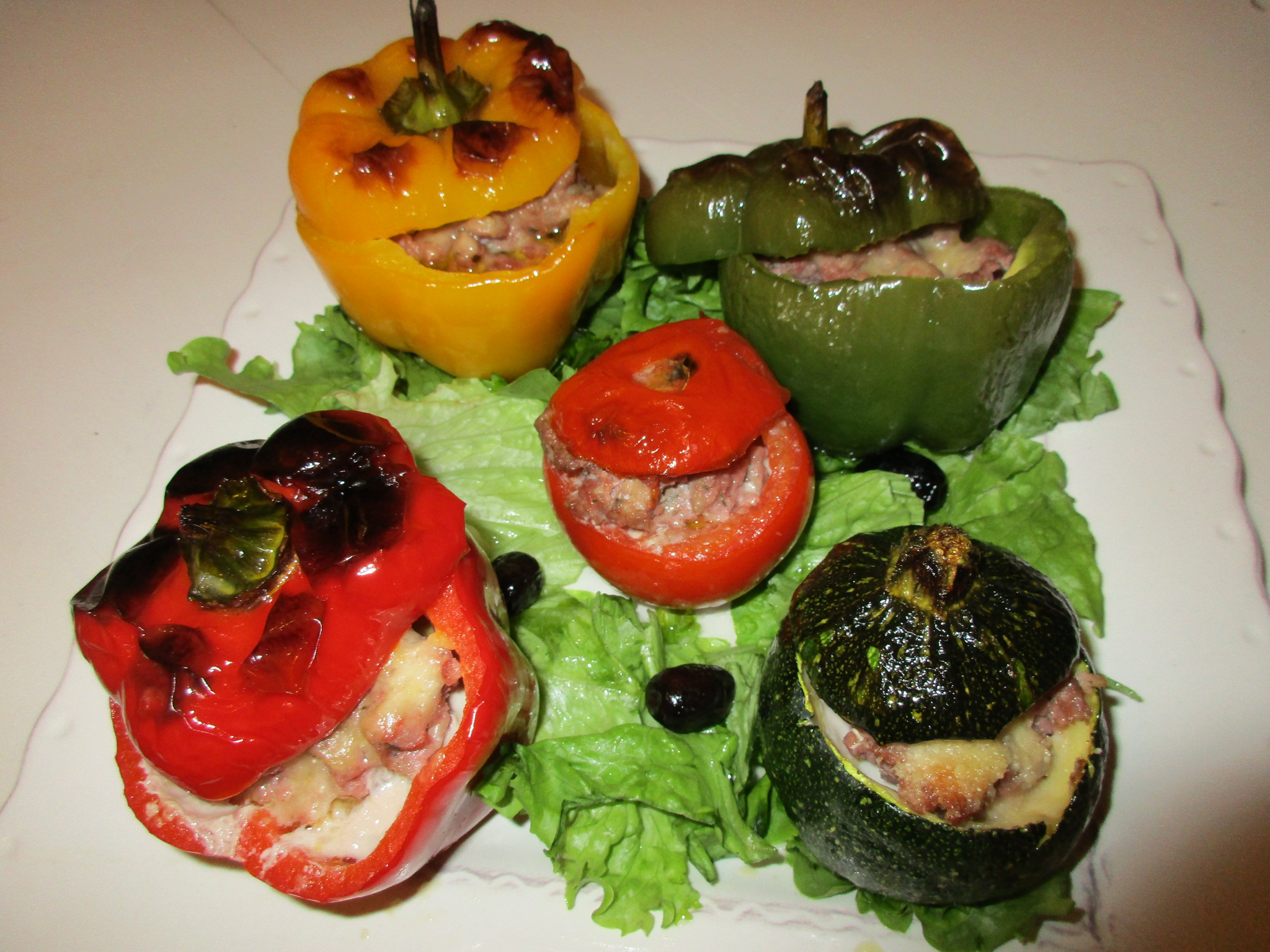
Stuffed vegetables

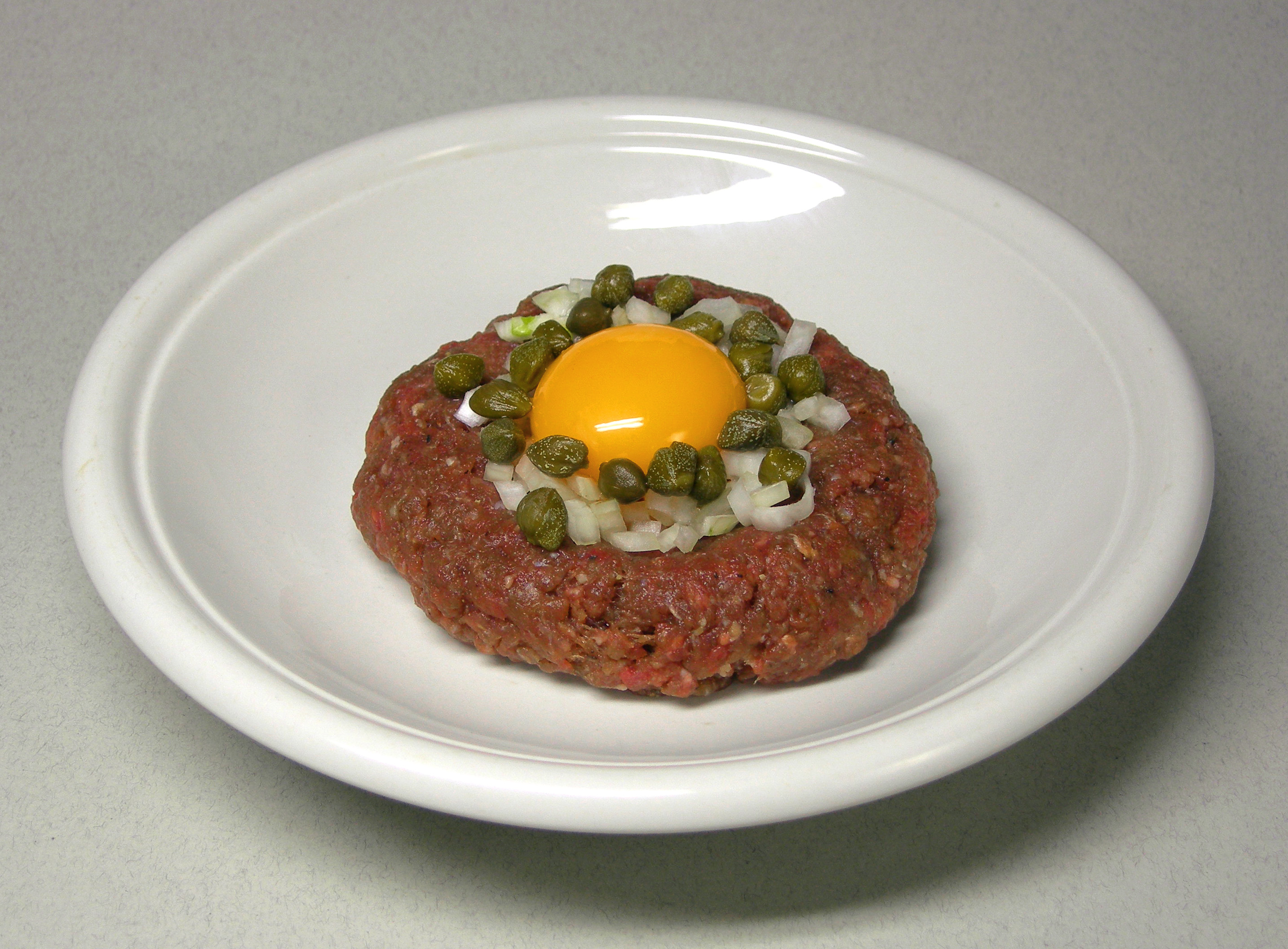
Steak tartare

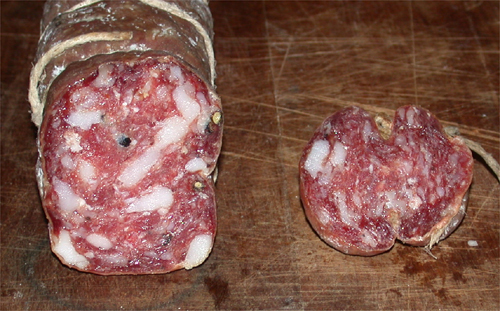
Sant'Olcese salami

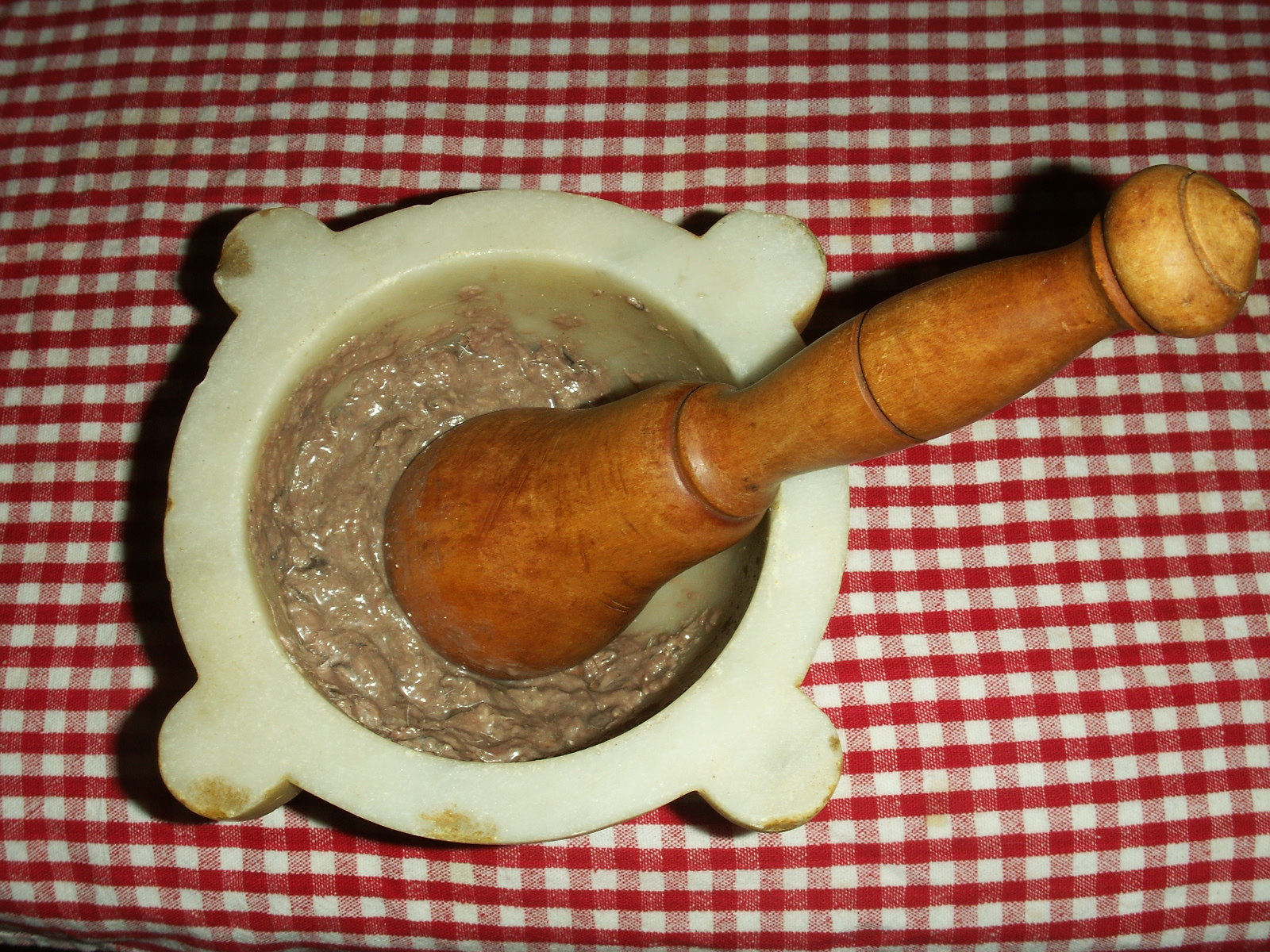
Anchovy paste

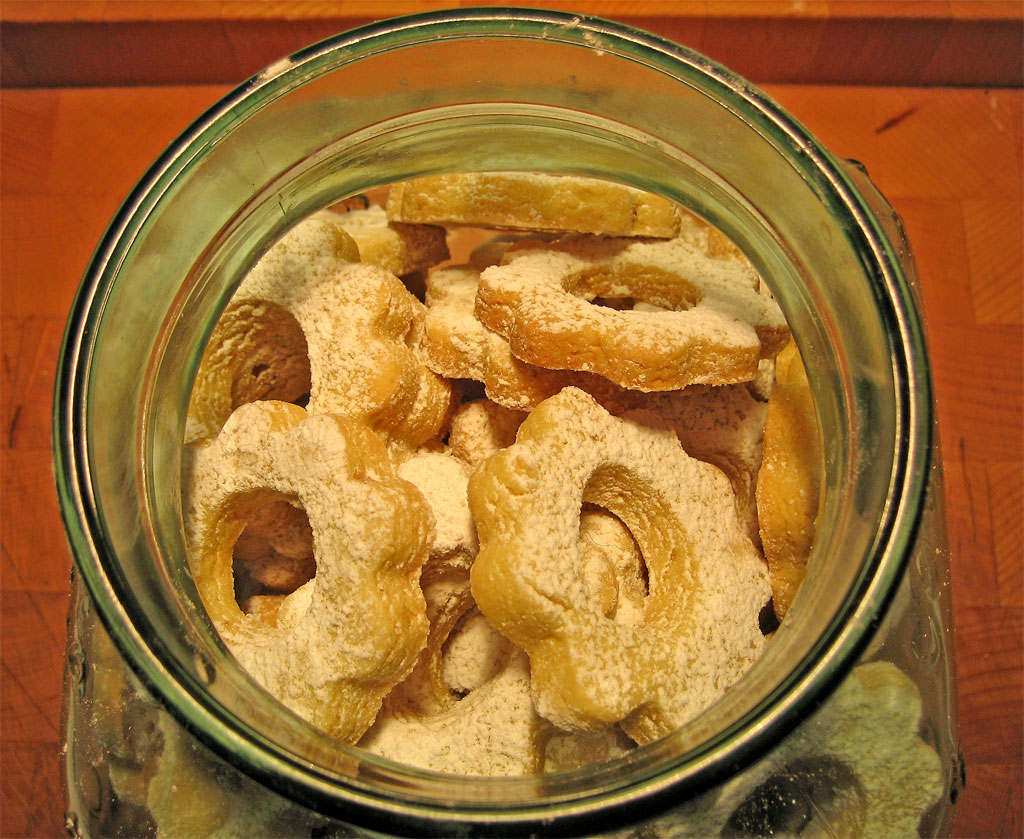
Canestrelli

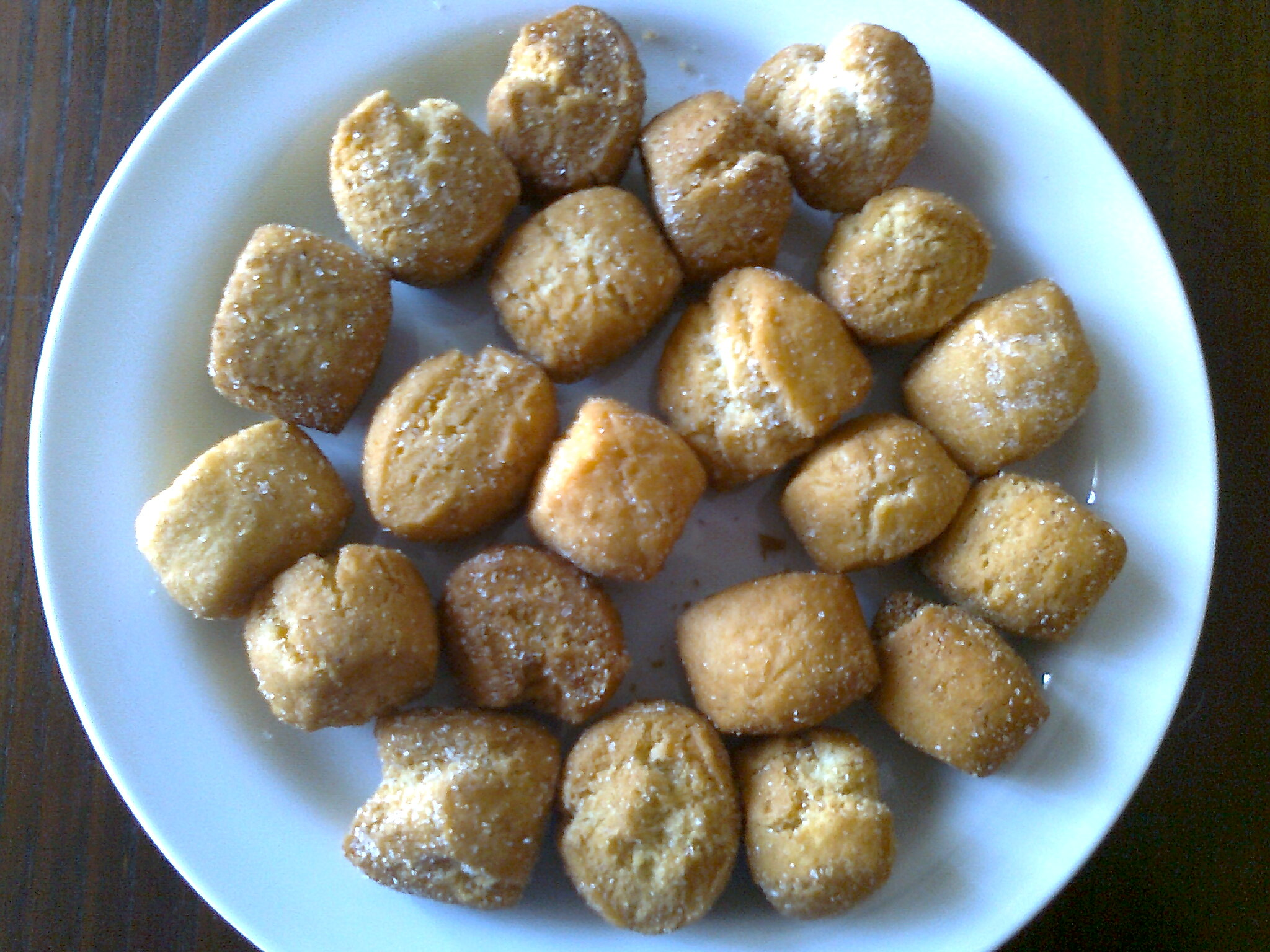
Castagnole

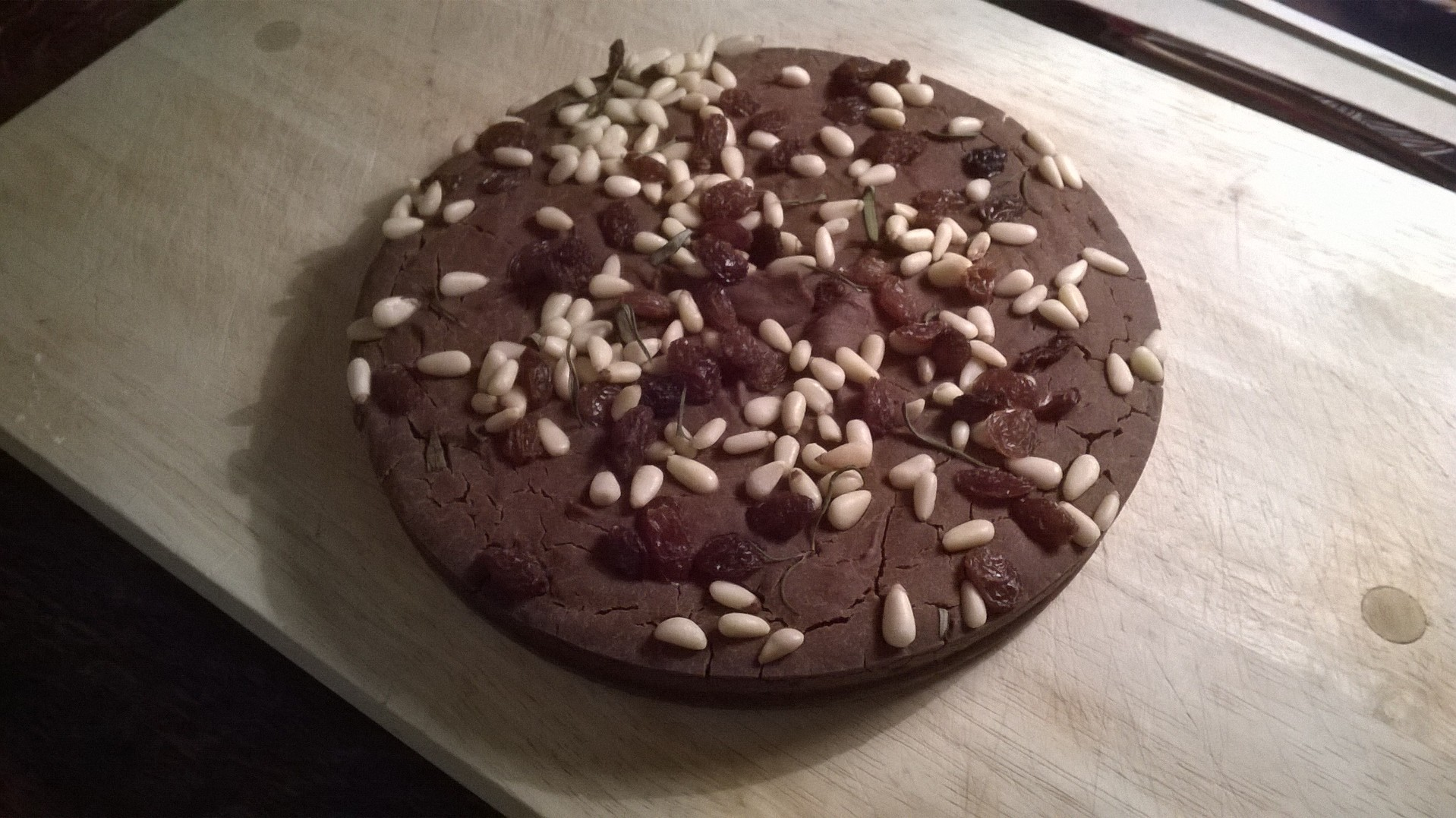
Castagnaccio

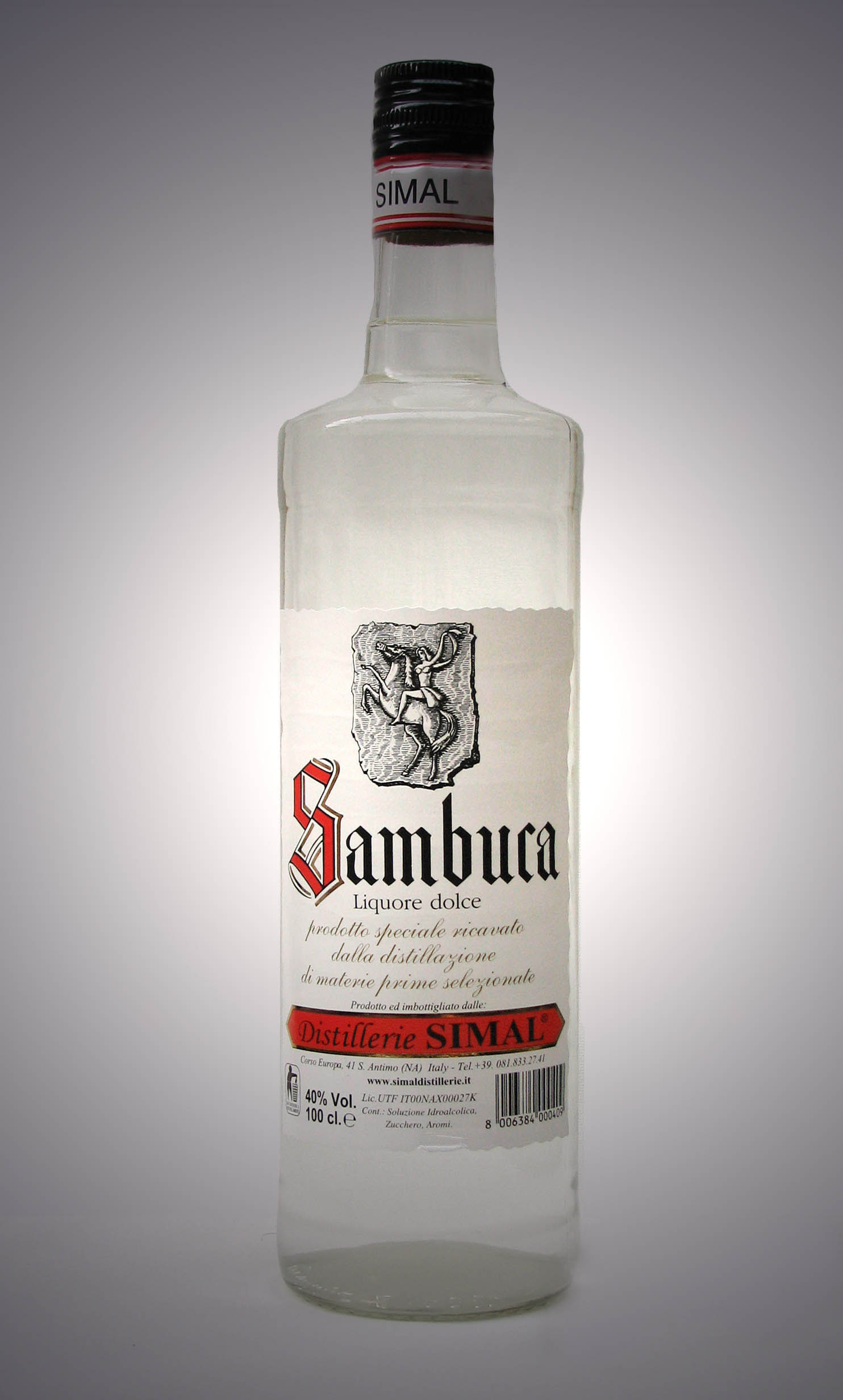
Bottle of sambuca

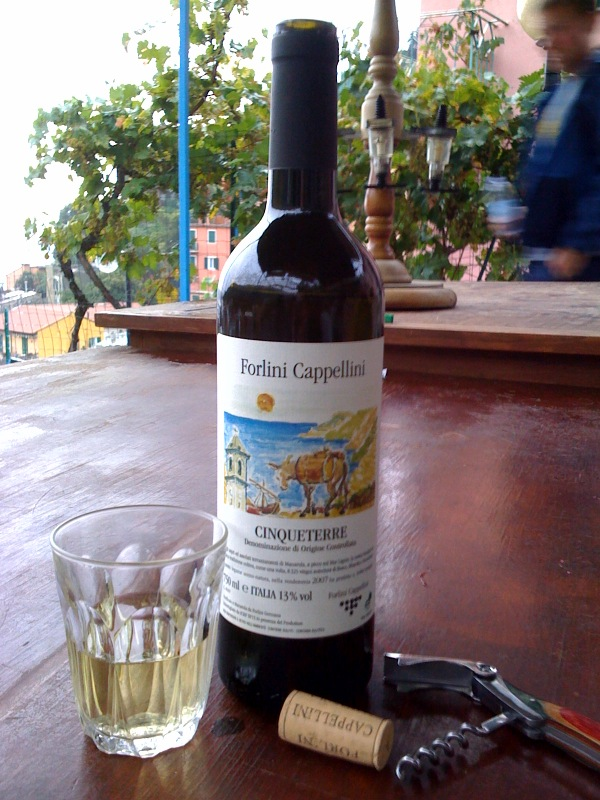
Cinque Terre DOC wine

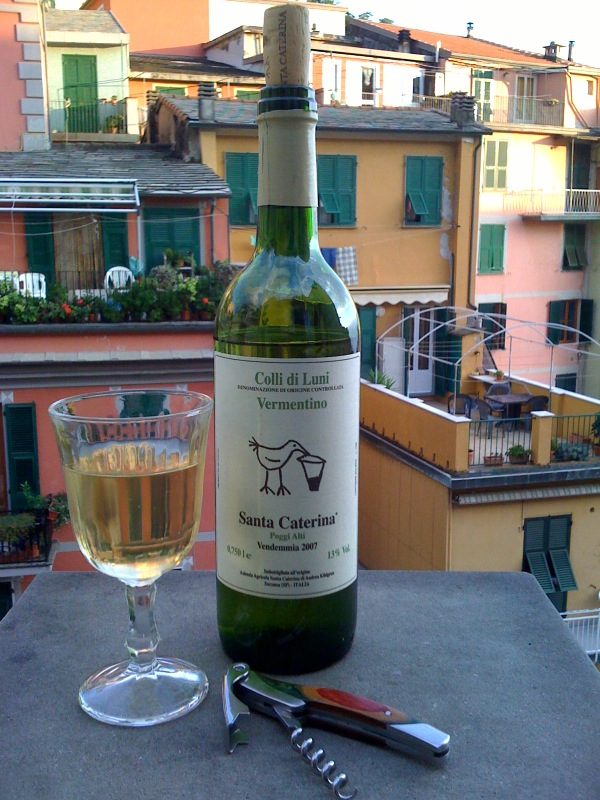
A Vermentino from the Colli di Luni DOC wine

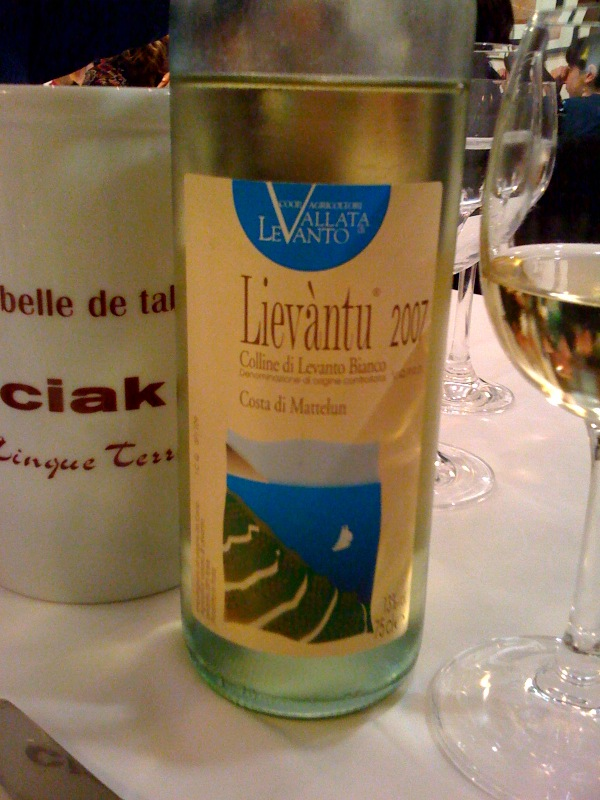
A wine from the Bianchetta Genovese DOC that includes Albarola in the blend.

Ligurian cuisine consists of dishes from the culinary tradition of Liguria, a region of northwestern Italy, which makes use of ingredients linked both to local production (such as preboggion, a mixture of wild herbs), and to imports from areas with which, over the centuries, the Ligurians have had frequent trade (such as Sardinian pecorino, one of the ingredients of pesto).

== Overview ==
Liguria is known for herbs and vegetables (as well as seafood) in its cuisine. Savory pies are popular, mixing greens and artichokes along with cheeses, milk curds, and eggs. Onions and olive oil are used. Due to a lack of land suitable for wheat, the Ligurians use chickpeas in farinata and polenta-like panissa. The former is served plain or topped with onions, artichokes, sausage, cheese or young anchovies. Farinata is typically cooked in a wood-fired oven, similar to southern pizzas. Fresh fish is used often in Ligurian cuisine. Baccalà (salted cod) is a source of protein in coastal regions; it is traditionally prepared in a soup.

Hilly districts use chestnuts as a source of carbohydrates. Ligurian pastas include corzetti, typically stamped with traditional designs, from the Polcevera Valley; pansoti, triangle-shaped ravioli filled with vegetables; piccagge, pasta ribbons made with a small amount of egg and served with artichoke sauce or pesto sauce; trenette, made from whole wheat flour cut into long strips and served with pesto; boiled beans and potatoes; and trofie, a Ligurian gnocchi made from wheat flour and boiled potatoes, made into a spiral shape and often tossed in pesto. Many Ligurians emigrated to Argentina in the late 19th and early 20th centuries, influencing the cuisine of the country (which was otherwise dominated by meat and dairy products that the narrow Ligurian hinterland would not have allowed). Pesto, sauce made from basil and other herbs, is uniquely Ligurian, and is often served with Ligurian pastas.

== Characteristics ==
Ligurian cuisine is affected by the geomorphological characteristics of its territory. It makes use of ingredients coming from the sea as well as game and meat. Ligurian cuisine has transformed over the centuries in relation to the socio-economic situation of the region. The scarcity of cattle pastures forced the Ligurians to develop dishes based on alternative ingredients such as fish and herbs, to which game was subsequently added. Ligurians pair their meat condiments based on wild or cultivated herbs, among which pesto stands out, which is used both as a sauce for pasta as well as being added to autumnal soups with a variety of fresh vegetables. Also important are the many savoury pies with vegetables, the most famous of which are the pasqualina cake, the ripieni and focaccia traditionally filled with stracchino cheese known as focaccia col formaggio. There are dishes based on ingredients such as herbs or chestnuts traditionally eaten by farmers. The preservation of food and therefore the use of Mason jars is fundamental in Ligurian cuisine, traditionally filled with mushrooms in oil, jams, honey, salted anchovies, brined foods, and dips.

== Starters (antipasti) ==
- Acciughe sotto sale
- Barbajuan
- Farinata bianca
- Farinata con il cipollotto
- Farinata con cipollotto e boraggine
- Farinata con il rosmarino
- Farinata di ceci
- Farinata di zucca
- 'e fugasette
- Focaccia con il formaggio
- Genoan focaccia
- Focaccia con le cipolle
- Focaccia con le olive
- Frittelle di lattuga, friscioeu, o friscioli
- Panissa(it)
- Pissaladière (with anchovies)
- Polpettone di melanzane
- salame di Sant'Olcese
- Sardenaira is only made with fish oil, without using anchovies nor sardines.
- Testaieu
- Testaroli
- Torta pasqualina
- Antipasto di funghi
- Antipasto misto di mare
- Antipasto misto ligure (con specialità locali dell'entroterra)
- Biscotti salati
- Crocchette di patate (impanate e fritte)
- Cuculli, frittelle di farina di ceci
- Farinata con i bianchetti (in dialetto gianchetti)
- Focaccia con le patate
- Focaccia ripiena
- Fritelle di cipolla
- Frittelle di pastella con fiori di zucca
- Frittelle di pastella con fiori zucca e pesce (bianchetti, ecc.)
- Gattafin
- Insalata di polpo
- Mortadella nostrale
- Mostardella di Sant'Olcese
- Mousse di funghi
- Olive marinate
- Pizza bianca con patate e fagiolini
- Polpettine fritte
- Polpo e patate
- Salsicce di Pignone
- Sgabei
- Torta baciocca, di patate e cipolle
- Torta di bietole
- Torta di carciofi
- Torta di patate
- Torta di riso
- Torta di trombette
- Torta di zucca
- Torta verde mista
- Verdure ripiene (con verdure o carne e verdura)

== Sauces ==
- Apple vinegar varietà di aceto
- Aggiadda
- Aglié
- Machetto or anchovy paste
- Pesto with basil
- Marò
- Ragù bianco
- Ragù di coniglio
- Ragù di selvaggina (cinghiale, lepre, cervo, ecc.)
- Ragù genovese, u toccu
- Salsa di noci
- Salsa di tartufo
- Salsa verde
- Sugo ligure
- Sugo di funghi
- Sugo con olive "taggiasche"
- Sugo di pesce

== Pasta, rice and soups ==
- Battolli
- Bavette
- Bricchetti
- Corzetti
- Fidelini
- Gnocchi
- Gran pistau
- Lasagne with pesto
- Lasagne alla ligure
- Lasagnetta di pesce
- Linguine
- Mandilli
- Mescciüa
- Minestrone alla genovese
- Pane cotto
- Panigacci
- Pansoti
- Pappardelle
- Penne
- Ravioli alla ligure (con "tuccu a-a zeneize")
- Ravioli di borragine
- Risotto ai carciofi
- Risotto ai frutti di mare
- Risotto ai funghi
- Risotto con sugo di trombette
- Scocuzzù
- Taglierini
- Trenette
- Trofie
- Zembi d'arzillo, fish ravioli
- Zemin di ceci

== Fish ==
- Acciughe in salamoia, dissalate, sott'olio
- Acciughe ripiene
- Baccalà al verde
- Bagnun
- Boghe in scabeccio
- Brandacujun
- Buridda
- Cappon magro
- Cicciarelli di Noli
- Ciuppin
- frexieoi de bacalà
- Gianchetti
- Rossetti
- Mosciame
- Muscoli alla marinara
- Mediterranean mussel.
- Stuffed mussels
- Pignurin alla salsa di pomodoro
- Seppie in zimino
- Seppie alla spezzina
- Stoccafisso accommodato
- Tonno alla genovese

== Meats ==
- Roasted lamb
- Asado
- Capra e fagioli
- Capretto
- Carne alla ciappa
- Cima
- Coniglio alla ligure
- Coniglio alla sanremese
- Cinghiale alla ligure con polenta
- Boar meat
- Fratti
- Fricassea di pollo alla ligure
- Frizze from Val Bormida, liver and pork sausage
- Gallo nero della val di Vara
- Giancu e negru (Bianco e nero), fritto misto alla genovese di frattaglie d'agnello note come (coratella)
- Prosciutto di Castelnuovo Magra
- Rostelle
- sanguinaccio (berodo)
- Game meats (such as venison, roe deer, hare)
- Stecchi fritti
- Tacchino alla storiona
- Head cheese
- Trippa alla genovese
- Sbira
- Trippa fritta
- Insalata di Trippa
- Vitello all'uccelletto
- Zucchine ripiene alla ligure

== Vegetables ==
- Asparago violetto of Albenga and Perinaldo
- Borage
- zucchini flower
- Perinaldo artichokes
- Carciofo violetto d'Albenga
- Cavolo lavagnino o Bronzino di Lavagna
- Condiglione
- Common bean of Badalucco
- Common bean of Pigna
- Common bean of Conio
- Cabbage
- Quarantine potato
- Preboggion
- Scorzonera
- Segranna
- Truffles from Val Bormida
- Verdure ripiene,
- Pumpkin from Rocchetta Cengio
- Pumpkin from trombetta d'Albenga
- Courgette from alberello di Sarzana

== Cheeses ==
- Brös
- Caprino cheese
- Casareccio di Gorreto
- Formaggetta della Val Graveglia,
- Formaggetta della Val di Vara
- Formaggetta Savonese
- Mozzarella di Brugnato
- Brutto ma buono di Brugnato
- Vaise
- Giuncata
- Mollana
- Prescinsêua cheese
- Ricotta ligure (Recottu)
- San Sté
- Tuma from brigasca sheep
- Toma di Mendatica dell'Alta Valle Arroscia

== Fruits ==
Fruits and fruit salad is usually paired with sweet, white or red wines.

- Apricots from Valleggia (Quiliano),
- Fresh and dried Chestnuts from Calizzano and Murialdo
- Cherries from Sarzana and Castelbianco
- Apples,
- Grapes

== Desserts ==
- Baxin
- Biscotti del Lagaccio
- Amaretto(it)
- Canestrelli
- Castagnaccio
- Castagnole
- Cubaite
- Angel wings
- Dragée
- Gelato alla Mimosa
- Latte dolce
- Mescolanza
- Michetta di Dolceacqua
- Olandesina
- Genoa cake
- Panera
- Risiny
- Sacripantina
- Spongata
- Amaretti di Sassello
- Anicini
- Baci di Sanremo
- Baci della Riviera (i più noti sono quelli di Alassio, ma ne esistono molte altre varianti)
- Baci di dama
- Biscotti alla lavanda
- Brioche Falstaff
- Buccellato di Sarzana
- Canditi di Genova
- Canestrello di Montoggio
- Cioccolato genovese
- Croccante di mandorle
- Cubaite
- Focaccia dolce di Sarzana
- Frittelle di mele
- Frittelle di San Giuseppe
- Frutta farcita al caramello
- Gelato "Paciugo"
- Chestnut Gelato
- Gobeletti
- Pane del marinaio
- Quaresimali
- Ravioli dolci
- Camogliesi al Rum
- Chocolate salami
- Salame dolce alla marmellata
- Salamella di cioccolato e biscotto
- Sciuette di Varese Ligure
- Torta di riso dolce
- Torta di Mazzini
- Torta Zena
- Dragiate

== Drinks ==
- Beer
- Rose syrup from Valle Scrivia
- Amaretto di Portofino
- Amaretto di Sassello
- Amaro Camatti
- Amaro Santa Maria al Monte
- Basilichito
- Chinotto
- Distillato di prugna di Varese Ligure
- Erba Luisa or Cedrina
- Grappa delle Cinque Terre
- Limonata di Portofino
- Limoncino delle Cinque Terre
- Basil liquor
- Perseghin
- Cider
- Sambuca

=== Wines from the Imperia province ===
- Ormeasco
- Pigato
- Rossese di Dolceacqua
- Rossese di Dolceacqua superiore
- Vermentino
- Moscatello di Taggia

=== Wines from the Savona province ===
- Lumassina
- Pigato
- Rossese d'Albenga
- Vermentino
- Granaccia
- Nostralino di Finalborgo

=== Wines from the Genoa province ===
- Bianchetta Genovese
- Bianco Tigullio
- Bianco frizzante del Tigullio
- Bianco di Coronata
- Ciliegiolo del Tigullio
- Ciliegiolo novello del Tigullio
- Moscato del Tigullio
- Polceverasco
- Rosso del Tigullio
- Spumante del Tigullio
- Vermentino del Tigullio
- Corochinato

=== Wines from the La Spezia province ===
- Albarola
- Bianco di Luni
- Bianco di Levanto
- Cinque Terre
- Novello di Levanto
- Rosso di Levanto
- Rosso di Luni
- Rosso riserva di Luni
- Sciachetrà
- Vermentino di Luni

== See also ==
- Italian cuisine
- Cuisine of Abruzzo
- Apulian cuisine
- Arbëreshë cuisine
- Emilian cuisine
- Lombard cuisine
- Cuisine of Mantua
- Cuisine of Basilicata
- Neapolitan cuisine
- Piedmontese cuisine
- Roman cuisine
- Cuisine of Sardinia
- Sicilian cuisine
- Tuscan cuisine
- Venetian cuisine

== Bibliography ==
- Franco Accame, Silvio Torre, Virgilio Pronzati. Il grande libro della cucina ligure: la storia, le ricette, i vini. Genova: De Ferrari. 2000. ISBN 8871720547.
- Renzo Bagnasco. La cucina ligure: piatti di ieri, ricette di oggi: 335 ricette: r e curiosità sulla tradizionale cucina ligure. Sagep. 1999. ISBN 8870587592
- Nada Boccalatte Bagnasco e Renzo Bagnasco. La tavola ligure ovvero Le ricette tradizionali per la cucina d'oggi. Milano: Edi. Artes. 1991. ISBN 8877240032.
- Andrea Carpi, Fulvio Santorelli.. 2009. ISBN 978-88-95470-14-6.
- Rudy Ciuffardi, Vincenzo Gueglio. Da un bosco in cima al mare. Gammarò. 2006.
- Franca Feslikenian. Cucina e vini della Liguria. Edizioni Mursia.
- Giuseppe Gavotti. Cucina e vini in Liguria. Editore Sabelli.
- Pierina Giauna Piagentini. Odore di focolare: i sapori della cucina tradizionale ligure: in 165 ricette della cucina tradizionale ligure in lingua italiana e dialetto ventimigliese. Pinerolo: Alzani. 2003. ISBN 8881701898.
- Paolo Lingua. La cucina dei genovesi. Muzio. 2004. ISBN 9788874130016
- Salvatore Marchese. La cucina ligure di Levante: le fonti, le storie, le ricette. Padova: Muzzio. 1990. ISBN 8870214842
- Alessandro Molinari Pradelli. La cucina ligure: i piatti tradizionali e quelli più attuali di una gastronomia che ha saputo esaltare come poche altre i sapori della sua terra. Roma: Newton Compton. 1996. ISBN 8881835258.
- Piras, Claudia; Medagliani, Eugenio (2000). Culinaria Italy. Könemann Verlagsgesellschaft mbh. ISBN 3-8290-2901-2.
- Giobatta Ratto. La cuciniera genovese. Editore: Pagano. Genova. 1893. Antico libro di ricette genovesi on-line.
- Emanuele Rossi e Giobatta Ratto. La vera cuciniera genovese facile ed economica. Editore: Giacomo Arneodo. Torino. 189.? Antico libro di ricette genovesi on-line.
- Aidano Schmuckher. Pesto e morta. Il grande libro della cucina ligure. Genova. Mondani. 1984.
