= Bavette =

Bavette may refer to:

- Bavette (pasta), narrow ribbon shape
- Flap steak

== See also ==
- Bavet, Svay Rieng, Cambodia
