= Corzetti =

Type of pasta

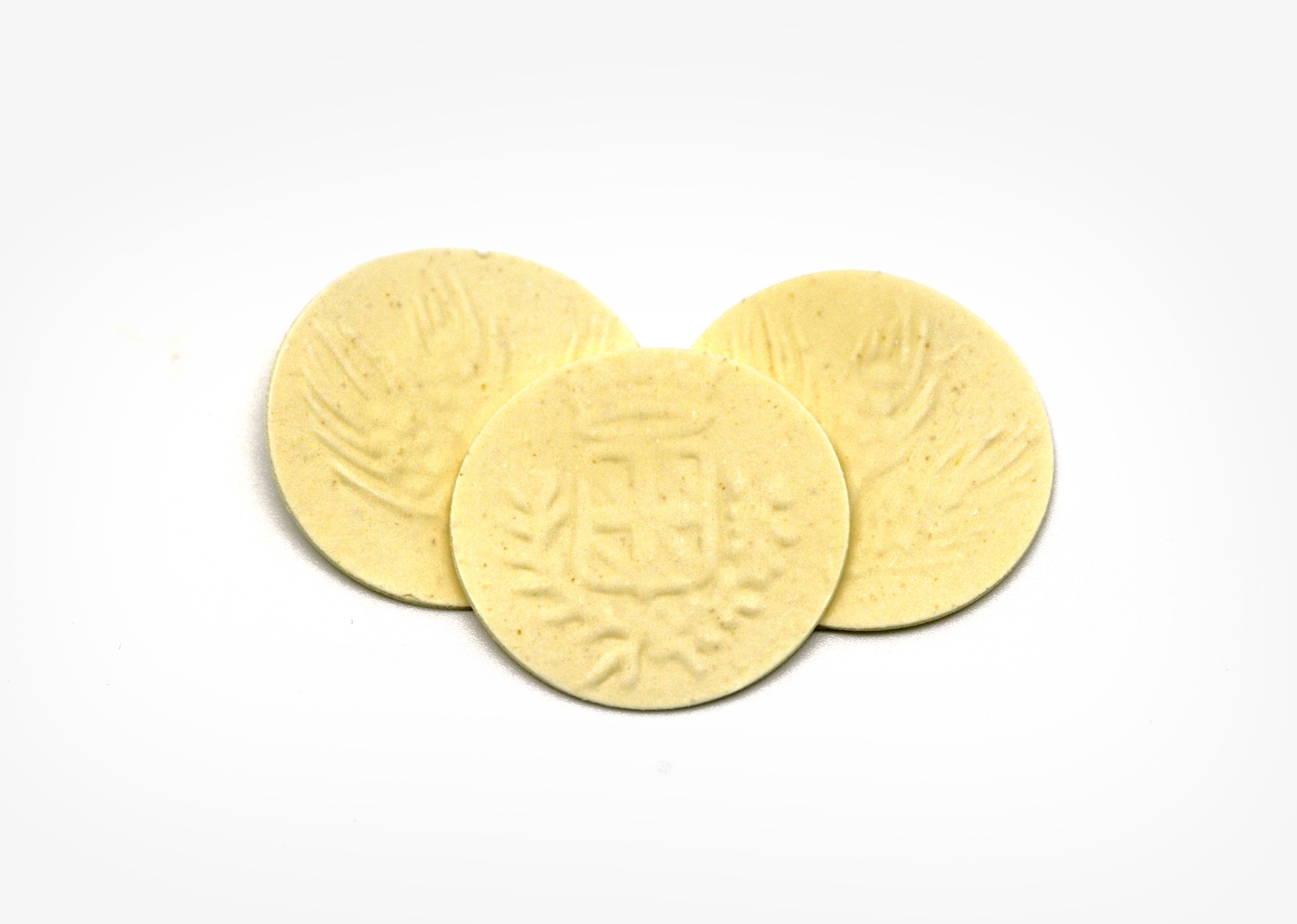
- Corzetti showing the manufacturer's stamp
- Alternative names: Croset (Piedmont); crosetti (Emilia-Romagna); croxetti, torsellini
- Type: Pasta
- Place of origin: Italy
- Region or state: Liguria

Corzetti or croxetti (Ligurian: [kur'zetˑi] or [kru'ʒetˑi]) are a type of pasta typical of the Ligurian cuisine of northwest Italy, and also traditional in the area of Novi Ligure just across the border with Piedmont, in the province of Alessandria. Corzetti originated in Liguria, in northern Italy along the border with France, during the Middle Ages. The name itself derives from a 14th-century Genoan coin, the corzetto.

There are different types of corzetti. Those from the Val Polcevera, one of the principal valleys of the area of Genoa, are made in a figure eight shape. Elsewhere corzetti stampæ (Ligurian: [kur'zetˑi staŋˈpɛː]; 'pressed' or 'stamped' corzetti) are found. These are small, thin rounds of pasta that are given an embossed decoration using a special wooden hand-tool. The embossing helps the pasta to hold its sauce better. A pasta with a similar name can also be found in neighbouring Piedmont, but its shape is more akin to that of orecchiette.

Corzetti are still produced in small batches near Genoa. In the past they were made by local peasants and used by aristocratic families as a display of wealth and status.

== Description ==
Sheets of pasta are stamped and cut into circles approximately 4 centimetres (1 1/2 inches) in diameter from flat pasta sheets with a mold to create the distinctive patterns. The combination mold/cutter may be made of hand-carved wood or a bronze die. The stamping may be done by hand or by machine, with the hand-stamped versions being more elaborate. The detail forms ridges that allow sauce to cling and add flavor.

The pasta typically has patterns on both sides, with an intricate design on one side and a simpler pattern on the other. Whereas they once featured a family coat of arms, the fancier side now features a regional coat of arms or the maker's trademark. Typical symbols on the other side are a cross (from which the name croxetti derives), fruit, family initials, mortar and pestle, sunsets, sailboats, or palm trees. In Italy they may be used as wedding favors or for other events, in which case an artisan craftsman is commissioned to make the die for people to prepare the pasta at home.

== Preparation ==
A pasta dough is made using flour, water and salt and rolled out into a sheet. The pasta is cut into rounds that are stamped to form the embossed relief, and left to dry for a while. Corzetti are usually served with a simple meat or mushroom sauce (the latter called tocco de funzi in Genoese), pesto, pine nut or walnut sauce, fish sauce, or light cream sauce.

== See also ==
Media related to Corzetti at Wikimedia Commons

- Cuisine of Liguria
- List of pasta
