= Cappon magro =

Italian seafood salad

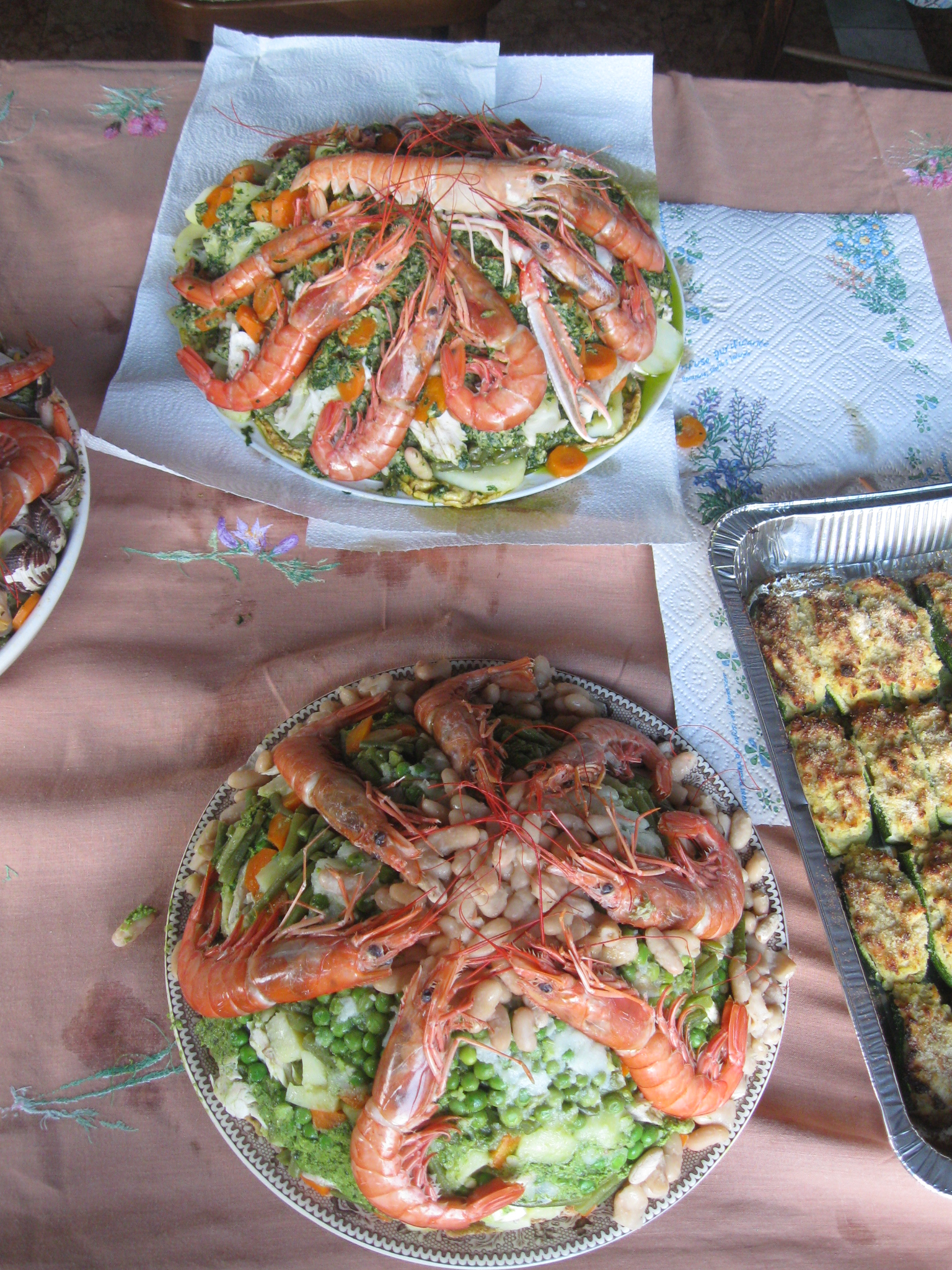
- Alternative names: Capon magro
- Type: Salad
- Place of origin: Italy
- Region or state: Genoa, Liguria
- Main ingredients: Seafood, vegetables, hard tack

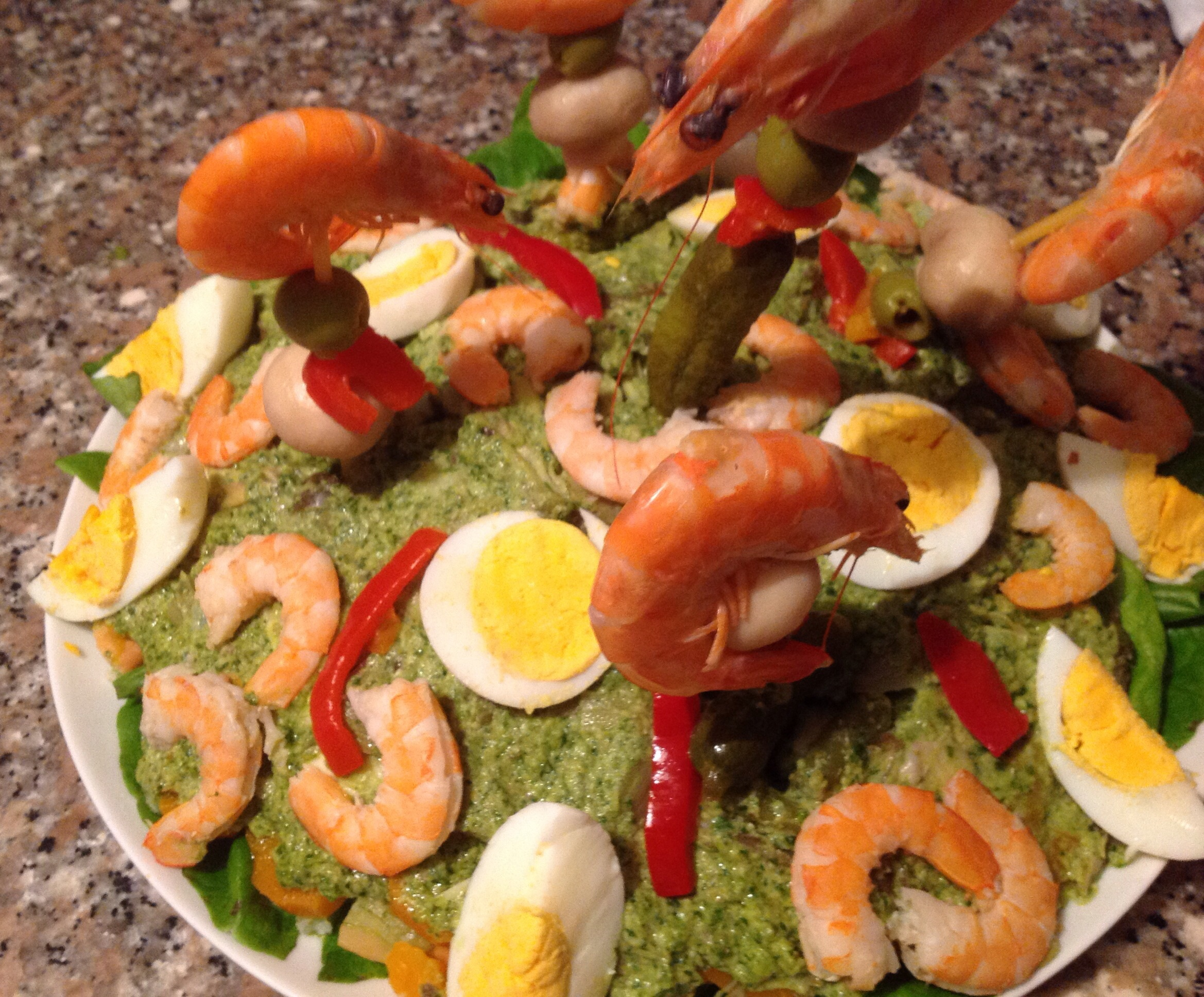
The cappon magro

Cappon magro (Italian: [kapˈpom ˈmaːɡro]; Ligurian: capon magro, Ligurian: [kaˌpuŋ ˈmaːɡru]) is an elaborate Genoese salad of seafood and vegetables over hardtack arranged into a decorative pyramid and dressed with a rich sauce.

A similar but much less elaborate dish is called capponata in Liguria (Ligurian: cappunadda), capponata in Sardinia, and caponata estiva or caponata di pesce in Campania. It is a salad of tomatoes, cucumbers, peppers, lettuce, hard-boiled eggs, bottarga, and dried tuna dressed with olive oil.

== Name ==
Cappon magro means 'fast-day capon'. As the dish contains no ingredients considered meat under the rules of traditional Catholic fasting, it is a suitable meal for the traditional Catholic fast days, including Christmas Eve. Capon may be a wry reference to the poultry capon, a traditional dish for Christmas. Or it may refer to the biscuit base, comparable to the French chapon, a slice of bread rubbed with garlic which is placed in the bottom of a soup or salad bowl. It may also refer to one of the many fish called "cappone" (perhaps a gurnard or red mullet).

== Preparation ==
The foundation of a cappon magro is a layer of hard tack biscuits (gallette) rubbed with garlic and soaked in seawater and vinegar. Then a pyramid is built up layer by layer.

Each layer may consist of one or many vegetables, fishes, or seafoods. All recipes include boiled white fish, a lobster, green beans, celery, carrots, beets, and potatoes. Some authorities insist that black salsify is essential. Other seafoods and vegetables may also be included. Each ingredient is boiled separately, cut up, and seasoned with oil and vinegar. Each layer is dressed with a sort of cross between salsa verde and mayonnaise; it consists of parsley, garlic, capers, anchovies, the yolks of hard-boiled eggs, and green olives ground together in a mortar with olive oil and vinegar. The pyramid is topped with a lobster capped with its coral. The sides of the pyramid are garnished with green olives, botargo, capers, anchovy filets, crayfish, artichokes, and quartered hard-boiled eggs.

== Naples caponata estiva ==
The Naples dish called "caponata estiva" (lit. 'summer caponata'), "caponata napolitana" or "caponata di pesce" consists of moistened ring-shaped rusks (friselle or gallette) dressed with oil, salt, garlic, oregano and basil, and topped with sliced tomatoes and possibly tuna. Any number of additional ingredients are optional, including smoked herring, pickled vegetables, olives, capers, anchovies, sardines, hard boiled eggs, very thinly sliced boiled beef, cucumber, carrot, celery.

== Traditions ==
Cappon magro is a traditional dish for Christmas Eve.

== See also ==
- Cuisine of Liguria
- List of fish dishes
- List of salads
