= Bavette (pasta) =

Type of pasta

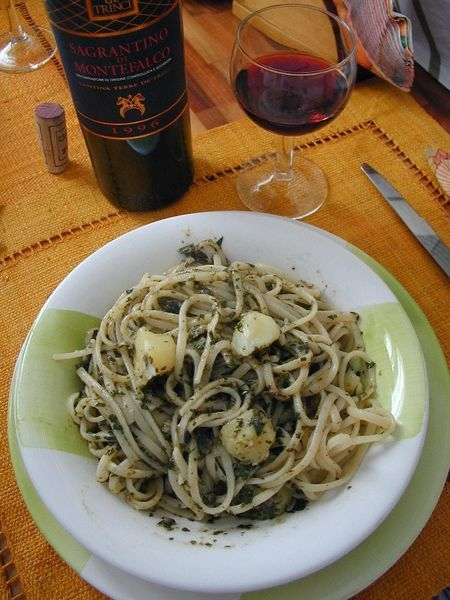
- Bavette al pesto
- Type: Pasta
- Place of origin: Italy

Bavette (Italian: [baˈvette]) is a type of pasta. It is a ribbon noodle narrower than tagliatelle, with a cross-section like flattened spaghetti, similar to trenette and wider than linguine. This type of pasta originated in the Italian city of Genoa, and is the most typical Ligurian pasta shape. Bavette is arguably one of the more ancient types of long pasta. The dish is frequently paired with traditional pesto sauces, but also pairs well with vegetables.

== See also ==
Media related to Bavette at Wikimedia Commons

- Cuisine of Liguria
- List of pasta
