= Gianchetti =

Fish

Gianchetti (also bianchetti, poutine in Nice, nonnat in Provence) are the whitebait of fish of the Mediterranean (sardines and anchovies, etc.), caught with special nets in the early months of the year. The relatively low catch means that the prices at market are rather high, even in comparison to other whitebait. Since the 1990s frozen gianchetti have also been available.

A speciality of the Ligurian cuisine and Provençal cuisine, gianchetti are generally lightly boiled in salted water and served hot, dressed with oil and lemon juice; another classic approach is to make fritters of the fish together with an egg and flour batter; finally they may simply be dipped in flour and deep fried. In Provence they are also used to make a traditional soup or omelettes.

The gianchetti of a red colour (ruscetti, rossetti) are tougher and scaly to the palate: they are largely used to flavour fish-based sauces.

== Gallery ==
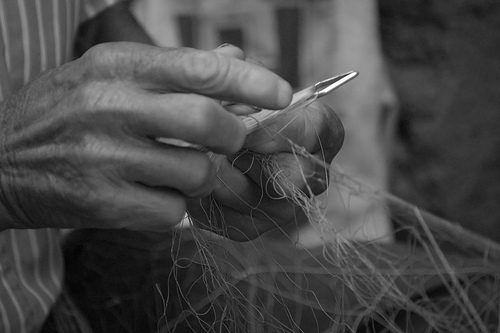
The hands of a fisherman working with his fishing net

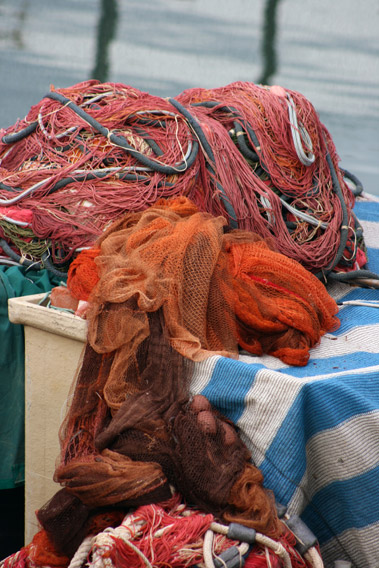
Nets of fishermen on the Italian Riviera

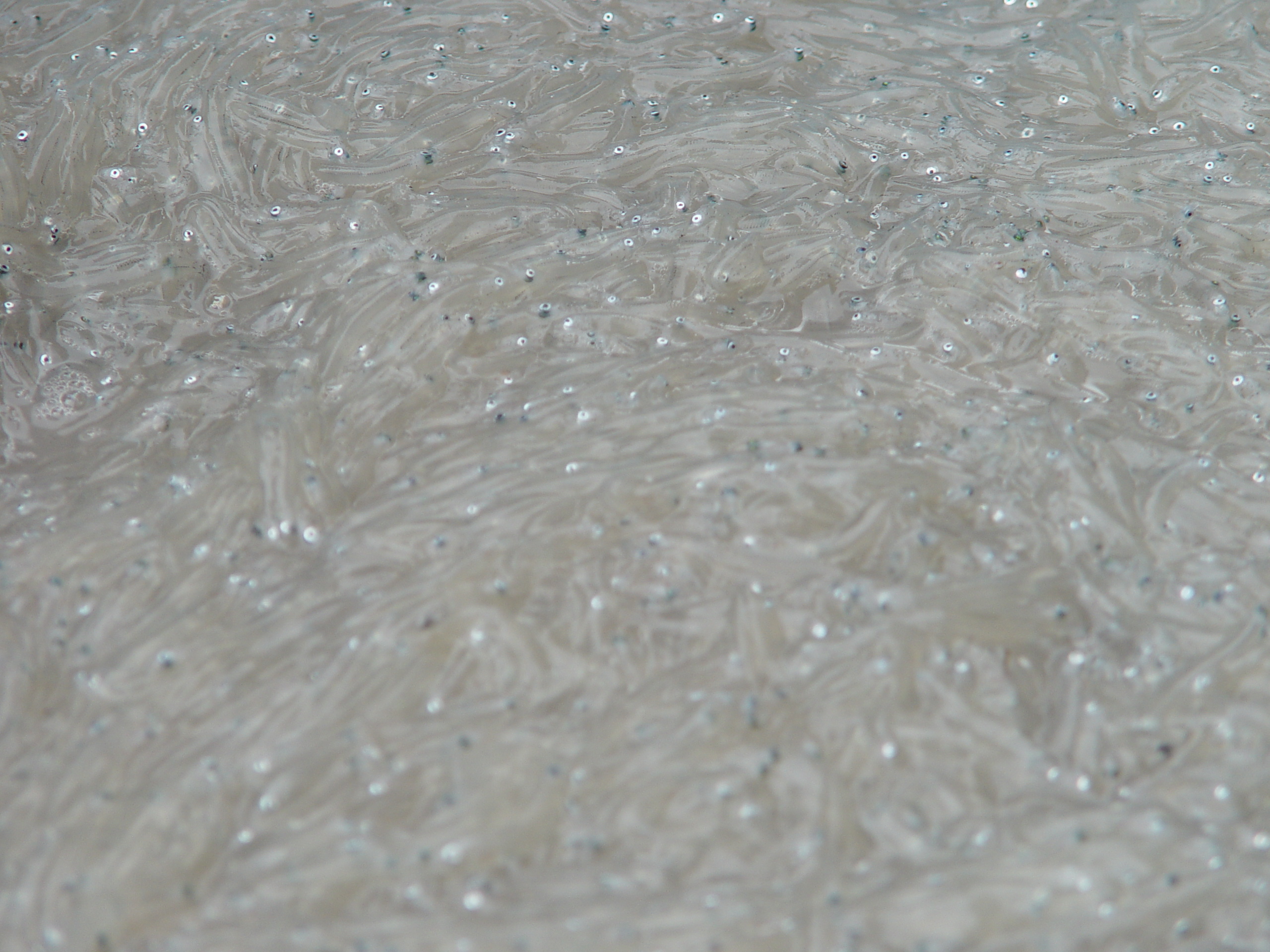
The gianchetti

== See also ==
- Cuisine of Liguria
- Cuisine of Provence
