= Capra e fagioli =

Typical dish of the hinterland of Imperia, Liguria

- Type: Stew
- Course: Secondo (Italian course)
- Place of origin: Italy
- Region or state: Hinterland of Imperia, Liguria
- Main ingredients: Goat meat, beans, white wine, olive oil, onions, carrots, celery, lardo, salt

Capra e fagioli (lit. 'goat and beans') or stufato di capra e fagioli (lit. 'goat and bean stew') is a typical dish of the hinterland of Imperia.

Capra e fagioli is a stew made from goat meat (preferably shoulder meat), cooked over a long period over a low heat with aromas, vegetables (onions, carrots, celery), white wine and, in the last part of cooking, white beans.

== See also ==
- Cuisine of Liguria
- List of stews
