= Polpettone di melanzane =

Italian peasant dish

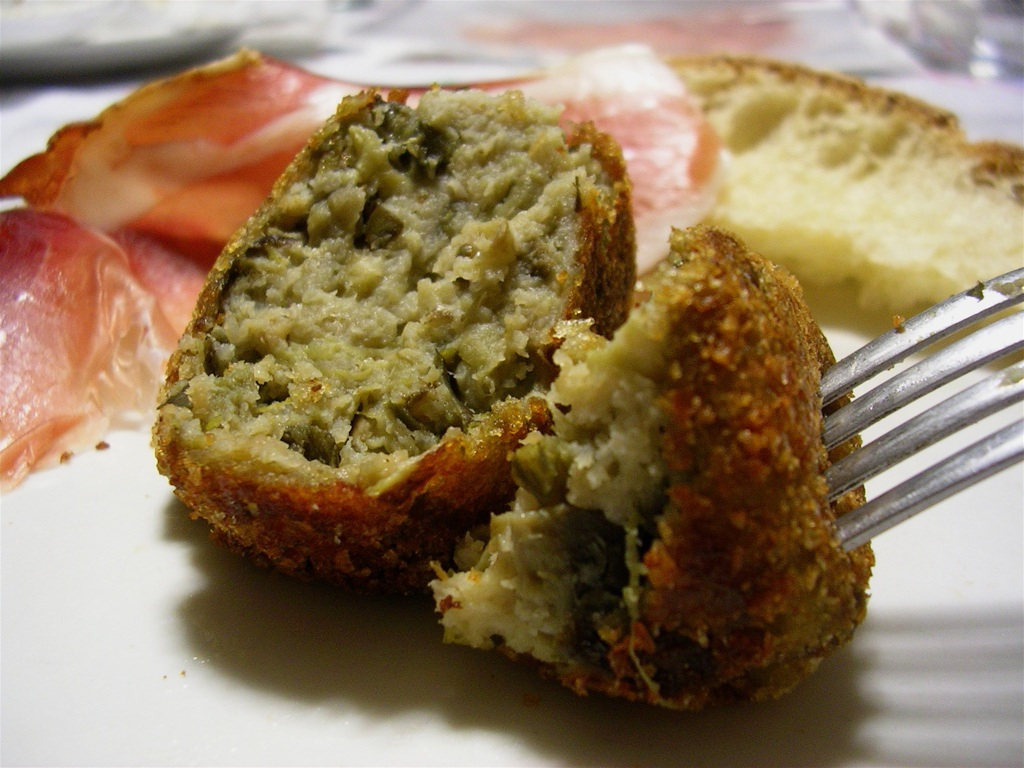
Polpette di melanzane

Polpettone di melanzane (lit. 'eggplant meatloaf') is a peasant dish originally from Levante Genoa, with many variants in other provinces of Liguria. It incorporates fresh summer products and inexpensive meats, as well as aromatic herbs. The recipe can be made with other summertime vegetables such as squash or beans.

== Preparation ==
Cooked eggplants are combined with egg and Parmesan and mixed by hand to form a type of "dough" that forms the "loaf" part of the polpettone. It is filled with salami and mozzarella, rolled to form the loaf, coated with a little flour and fried.

== See also ==
- Cuisine of Liguria
