= Coniglio alla sanremese =

Ligurian rabbit meat dish

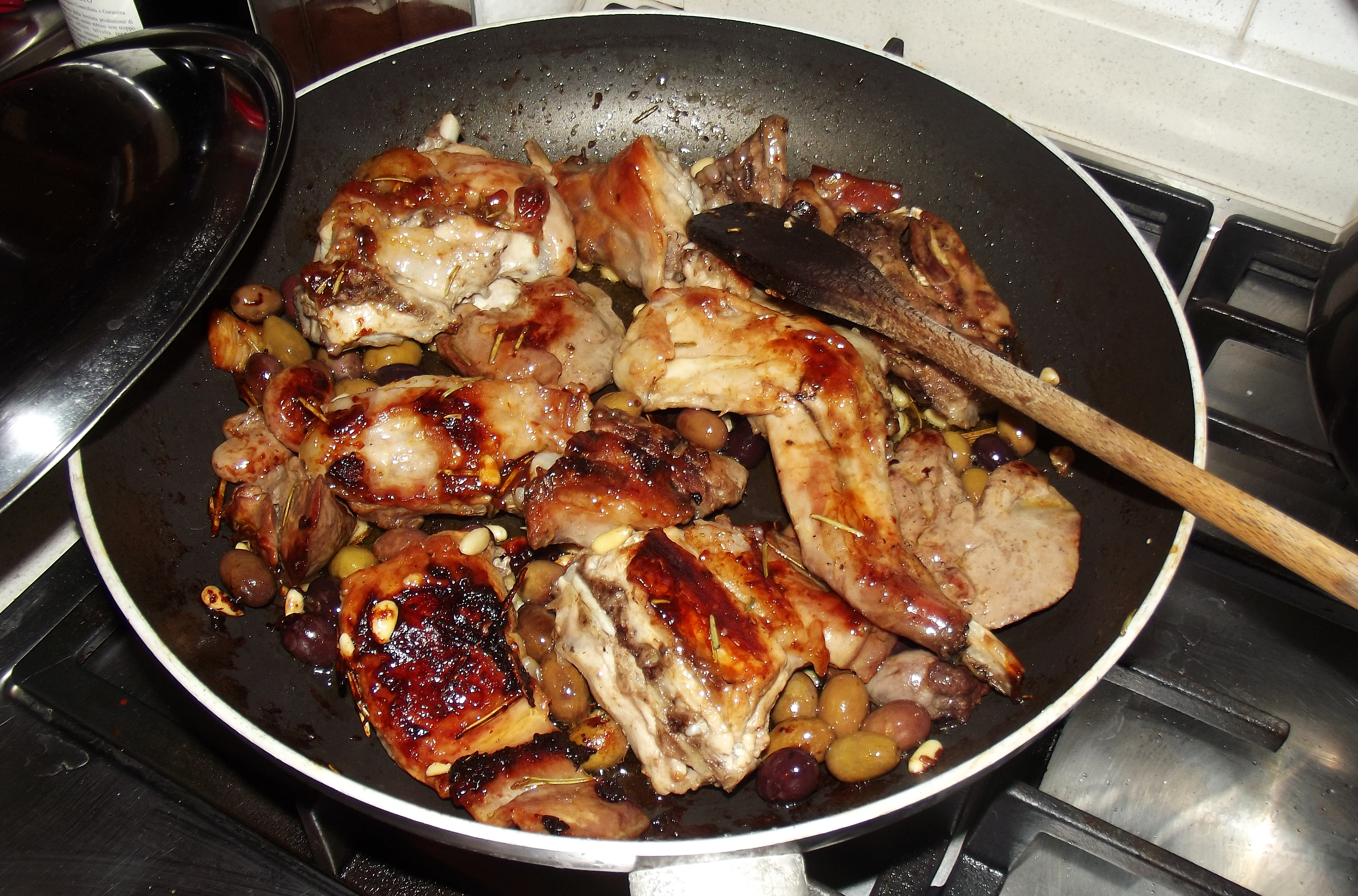
- Course: Secondo (Italian course)
- Place of origin: Italy
- Region or state: Sanremo, Liguria
- Associated cuisine: Italian (Ligurian)
- Main ingredients: Rabbit meat

Coniglio alla sanremese (Intemelio: conîo â sanremasca) is an Italian recipe based on rabbit, cooked and served with a sauce enriched with olives, walnuts and herbs. It is a traditional dish of Ligurian cuisine, originating in the town of Sanremo; variations of the recipe, under the name coniglio alla ligure, are spread all over Liguria.

In the main recipe, the rabbit meat is sautéed in a pan where onion, thyme, rosemary, a stalk of celery, a few walnuts, a glass of red wine and Taggiasca olives are added. Separately, the liver and the head of the rabbit are cooked and pounded to extract the sauce, which can also be used to season pasta.
