= Baxin =

Italian sweet baked good

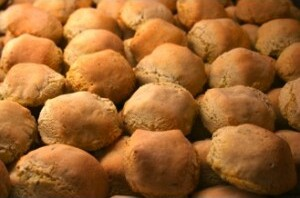
- Place of origin: Italy
- Region or state: Liguria
- Main ingredients: Fennel seeds, sugar, flour, lemon

Baxin, also known as baxin d'Albenga, is a typical sweet baked good originating in the Liguria region of Italy. It is made with fennel seeds, cloves, sugar, flour and lemon.

Baxin has been made for some time; by the eighteenth century, it was produced and sold by Benedictine monks in Liguria. Its origin is unknown.

== See also ==
- Cuisine of Liguria
- List of Italian desserts and pastries
