= Trenette =

Type of pasta

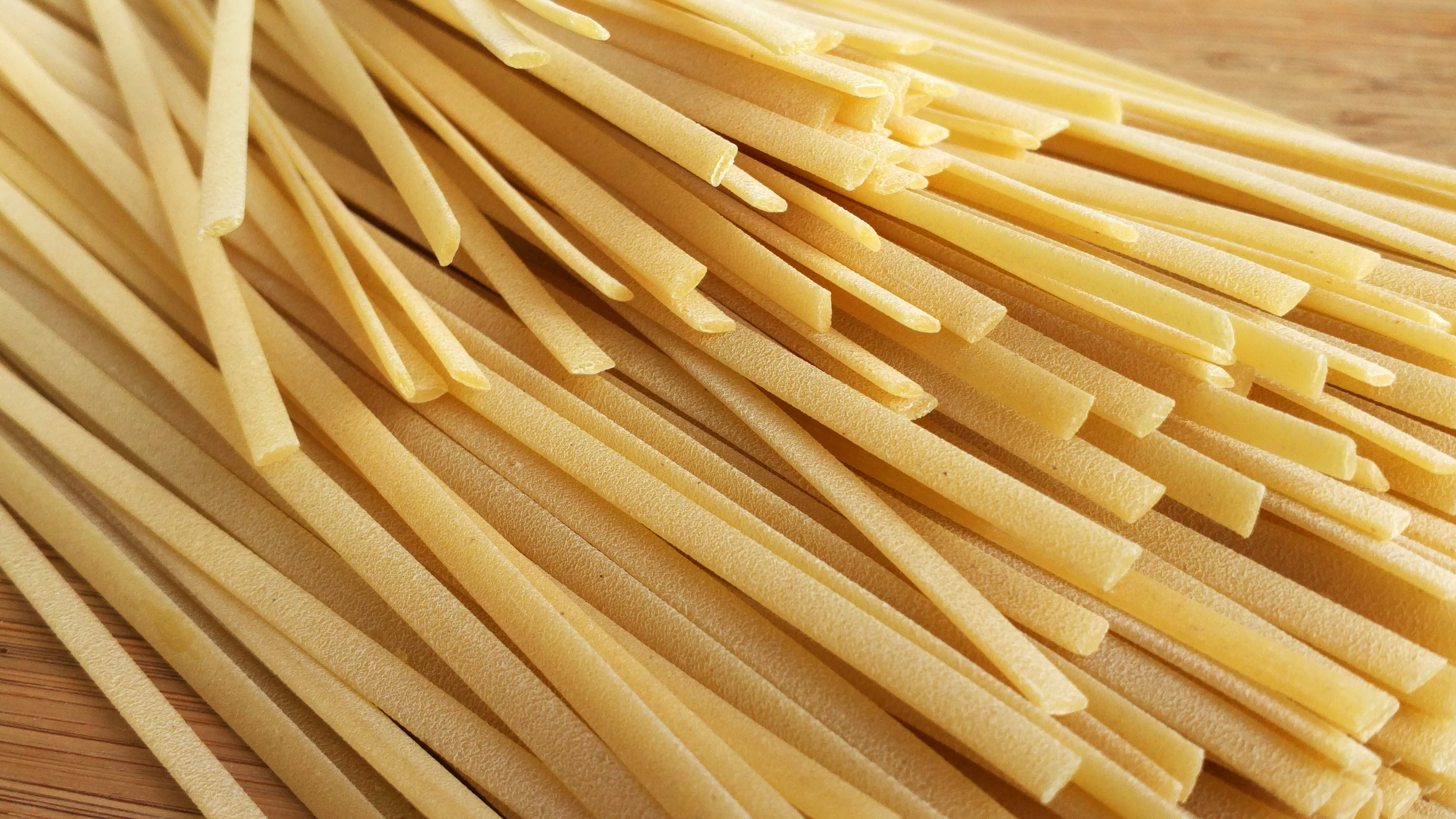
- Type: Pasta
- Place of origin: Italy
- Region or state: Liguria

Trenette (Italian: [treˈnette]) is a type of narrow, flat, dried pasta from Genoa, Liguria; it is similar to linguine. Trenette is the plural of trenetta, but is only used in the plural and is probably a diminutive of the Genoese trena, meaning 'string'. The pasta is most commonly 3.5 – 4mm in width and roughly 1.5mm in thickness. Trenette is commonly served in the form of pasta served with pesto, a dish known as trenette al pesto, which can also include potatoes and green beans boiled in the same water.

== Recipe ==
It is common in northern Italian cuisine, in regions such as Liguria, to make pasta by hand. Handmade, fresh pasta is typically made with semolina or 00 flour, which is then hydrated with eggs—one egg per 100g of flour. In some cases, eggs can be substituted with water and a bit of olive oil to replicate the water and fat content of eggs.

== See also ==
- Cuisine of Liguria
- List of pasta
