= Tuma (cheese) =

Type of cheese

Tuma or Toma is a stage in the production of Pecorino cheese, which comes before salting and maturation. By extension, it also indicates cheese that is consumed or commercialized at this stage of production.

In a broader sense, it can refer to fresh cheese made of ewe's milk, cow's milk or a mixture. Originally Tuma was only made from ewe's milk, but nowadays the use of cow's milk is generally accepted.

The four stages of maturation of the Pecorino cheese are:

- Tuma (directly from the curd)
- Primosale (addition of salt and maturation for one month)
- Secondo sale (maturation for at least another four months)
- Pecorino stagionato (any maturation period longer than five-six months)

Cheese products can be consumed at any of those stages and are usually referred to by the last stage completed.

Tuma is a typical product of southern Italy, especially Sicily, being particularly common in the interior areas. Since it is produced from the curd without the addition of salt, it has to be consumed within one or, at most, two weeks or it will spoil.

In France, Piedmont and the Aosta Valley there is a type of cheese, produced with different methods, that has a similar name: tomme or Tome in French and tuma or toma in the local dialect.

== See also ==
- List of Italian cheeses
