= Musciame =

Preserved dolphin meat

- Alternative names: Mosciame; Mosciamme
- Type: preserved meat
- Place of origin: Italy
- Region or state: Liguria; Tuscany
- Main ingredients: dolphin meat; salt
- Variations: Musciame di tonno

Musciame or mosciame is a traditional Italian preserved meat made from the salted and sun-dried flesh of dolphins. It is black, and looks like a piece of charred wood hanging from a string. It was made by the sailors and fishermen of the coast of Liguria and Versilia; under European law, it may no longer be legally produced or sold. A somewhat similar product in Sicily made from fillet of tuna, often sold as "mosciame di tonno", is essentially the same as the mojama de atún of Spain.

== Production ==
Musciame was made on board ship by the sailors and fishermen of the Ligurian and Versilian coast, in north-west Italy. Strips of dolphin meat were salted, then hung by a string from the mast to dry in the sun for about a week. The result had the appearance of a small log charred by fire. The meat was black, and became hard if kept for long.

Musciame may not legally be sold or produced in Italy. The intentional capture or killing of any species of cetacean is prohibited by the Habitats Directive of the European Community, 92/43/CEE. Under the terms of EU regulation 338/97, where cetaceans are listed in Annex A, it is illegal to buy, sell or obtain dolphin meat. In 2014, after an exposé by an investigative reporter from the television programme Le Iene, the Guardia Costiera and the port authorities of Civitavecchia confiscated vacuum-packed musciame destined to be secretly served in a restaurant in the area, and investigated those responsible for trafficking in it. In the same year, the corpse of a young bottlenose dolphin was found butchered on a beach at Golfo Aranci in Sardinia; the Ente Nazionale Protezione Animali, the national league for the protection of animals, said that it had been slaughtered for musciame. According to a report published in 2015 by the Lega Anti Vivisezione, the Italian anti-vivisection league, illegal killing of dolphins for musciame production continues.

== Consumption ==
Musciame was a basic element of the diet of Ligurian seamen, who ate it with ship's biscuit softened with sea-water and vinegar, accompanied by vegetables. It is eaten very thinly sliced; it may be simply seasoned with olive oil, or served on slices of tomato, or accompanied by boiled beans and onion. If the meat is particularly hard it may need to be softened by soaking in cold water for a few hours.

== Musciame di tonno ==
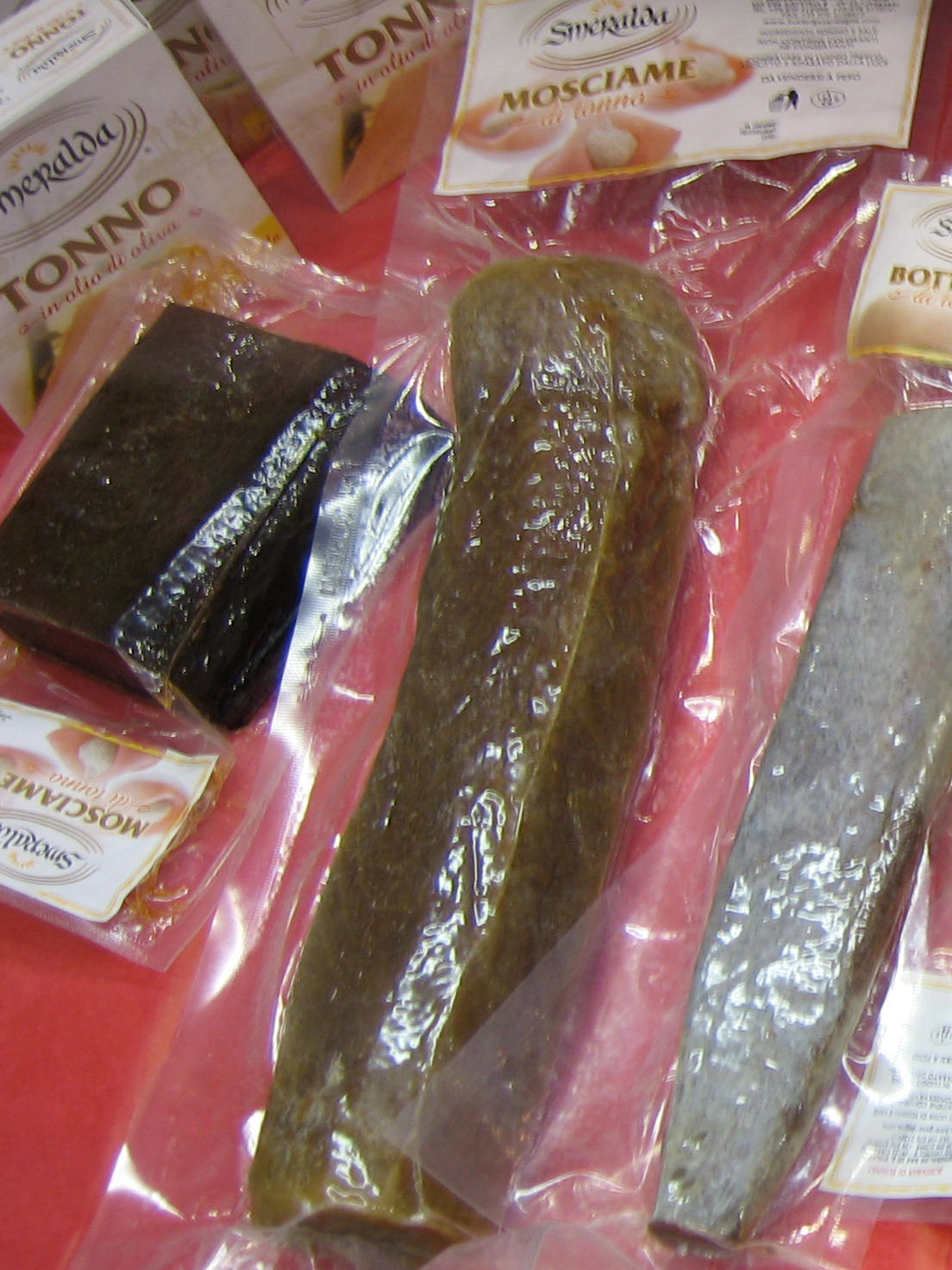
Italian musciame di tonno on display at the 2007 Fancy Food Show

Dolphin musciame may be substituted with a similar food, musciame di tonno, which is made from fillet of tuna. It is prepared in the summer months by salting strips of tuna fillet from the large conical muscle known as bodano, which are then sun-dried, smoked, or – more often – dried in a warm oven.
