= Liguria =

Region of Italy

Coordinates: 44°27′00″N 8°46′00″E

Liguria Ligûria (Ligurian)
- Region
- Flag Coat of arms

- Country: Italy
- Capital: Genoa

Government
  - Type: Presidential system
  - President: Marco Bucci (Ind.)

Area
  - Total: 5,416.21 km^{2} (2,091.21 sq mi)

Population (2026)
  - Total: 1,511,988
  - Density: 279.160/km^{2} (723.021/sq mi)
- Demonym(s): English: Ligurian; Italian: Ligure

GDP
  - Total: €58.959 billion (2024)
  - Per capita: €30,046 (2024)
- Time zone: UTC+1 (CET)
  - Summer (DST): UTC+2 (CEST)
- ISO 3166 code: IT-42
- HDI (2021): 0.901 very high · 10th of 21
- NUTS Region: ITC
- Website: regione.liguria.it

Liguria (/lɪˈɡjʊəriə/ lig-YOOR-ee-ə, Italian: [liˈɡuːrja]; Ligurian: Ligûria [liˈɡyːɾja]; French: Ligurie) is a region of north-western Italy; its capital is Genoa. Its territory is crossed by the Alps and the Apennines mountain range and is roughly coextensive with the former territory of the Republic of Genoa. Liguria is bordered by France (Provence-Alpes-Côte d'Azur) to the west, Piedmont to the north, and Emilia-Romagna and Tuscany to the east. It rests on the Ligurian Sea, and has a population of 1,511,988 as of 2026. The region is part of the Alps–Mediterranean Euroregion.

== Etymology ==
The name Liguria predates Latin and has no settled etymology. The Latin adjectives Ligusticum (as in Mare Ligusticum) and Liguscus reveal the original root of the name, ligusc-: in the Latin name -sc- was shortened to -s-, and later turned into the -r- of Liguria, according to rhotacism. Compare Ancient Greek: λίγυς, romanized: Lígus, lit. 'a Ligurian, a person from Liguria' whence Ligustikḗ λιγυστική transl. the name of the place Liguria. The name derives from the ancient Ligures people, although the territory of this people was much larger than the current administrative region; it included all of North-west Italy south to the Po river, and south-eastern France.

== History ==
=== Prehistory ===
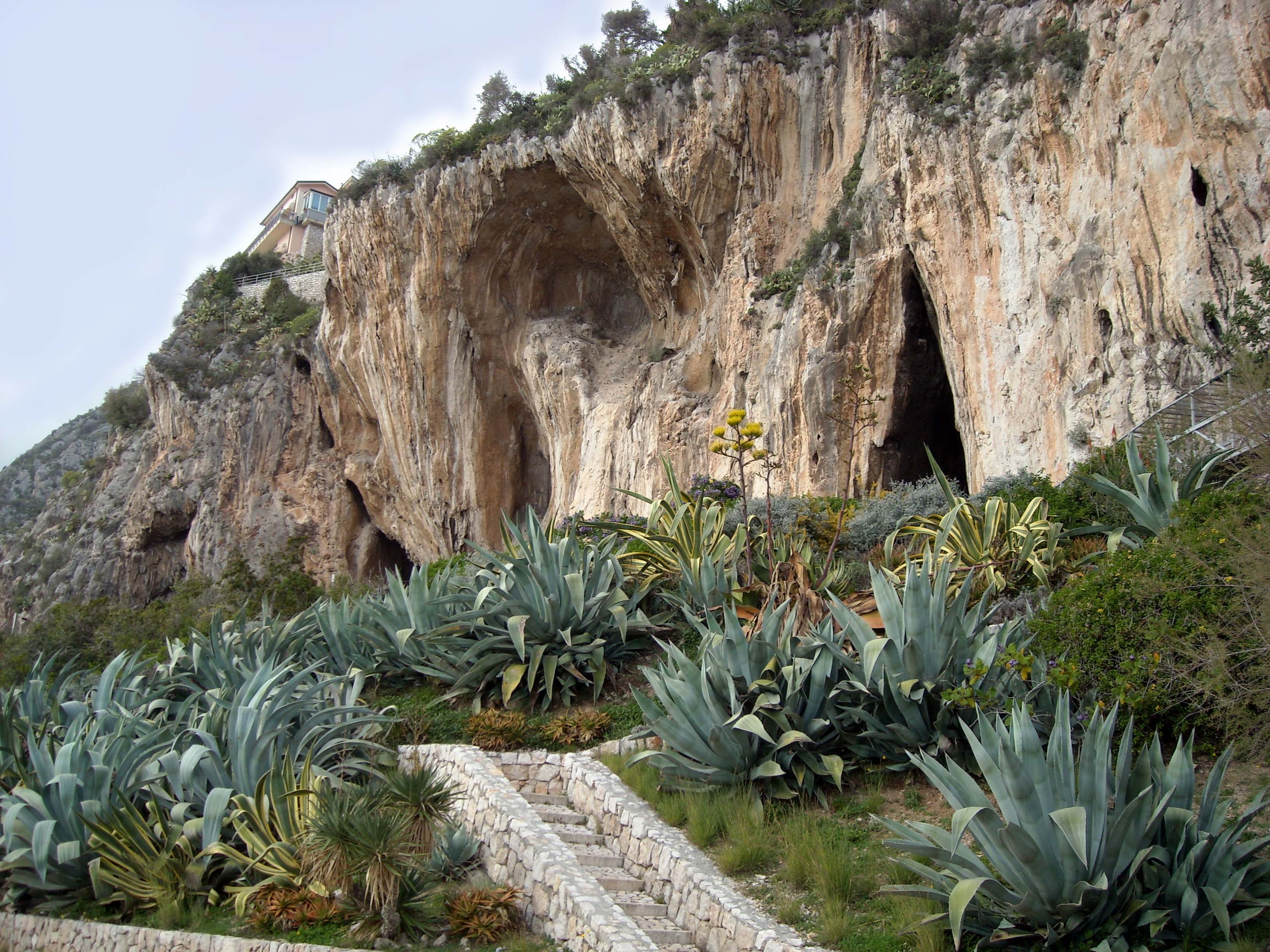
The Balzi Rossi caves, located on a cliff about 100 meters high, show traces of human occupation from the Middle Palaeolithic (300,000 years) to the foundation of the ancient city of Ventimiglia in Liguria. This constitutes the longest human occupation in the world of a geographical site.

Evidence of human presence in Liguria dates back to prehistoric times. Near the port of Nice, in Terra Amata, traces of the oldest huts built by nomadic hunters, around 300,000 years ago, have been found. The stratigraphy showed different settlement periods, with the remains of oval huts with a central hearth, chipped pebbles, scrapers and captured animals such as wild boar, turtles, Merk's rhinoceros, southern elephants, aurochs and various birds. Traces of Neanderthal Man have been found near Loano. In the caves of Toirano, signs of frequentation dating back to the end of the Upper Palaeolithic are visible. Remains reminiscent of Cro-Magnon Man have appeared in the Balzi Rossi cave in Ventimiglia. At the Arene Candide there is evidence of Neolithic and epigravettian strata dating between 20,000 and 18,700 years ago, while in the caves along the Pennavaira stream, in the valley of the same name in the Ingauno area, human remains have been found dating back as far as 7,000 BC.

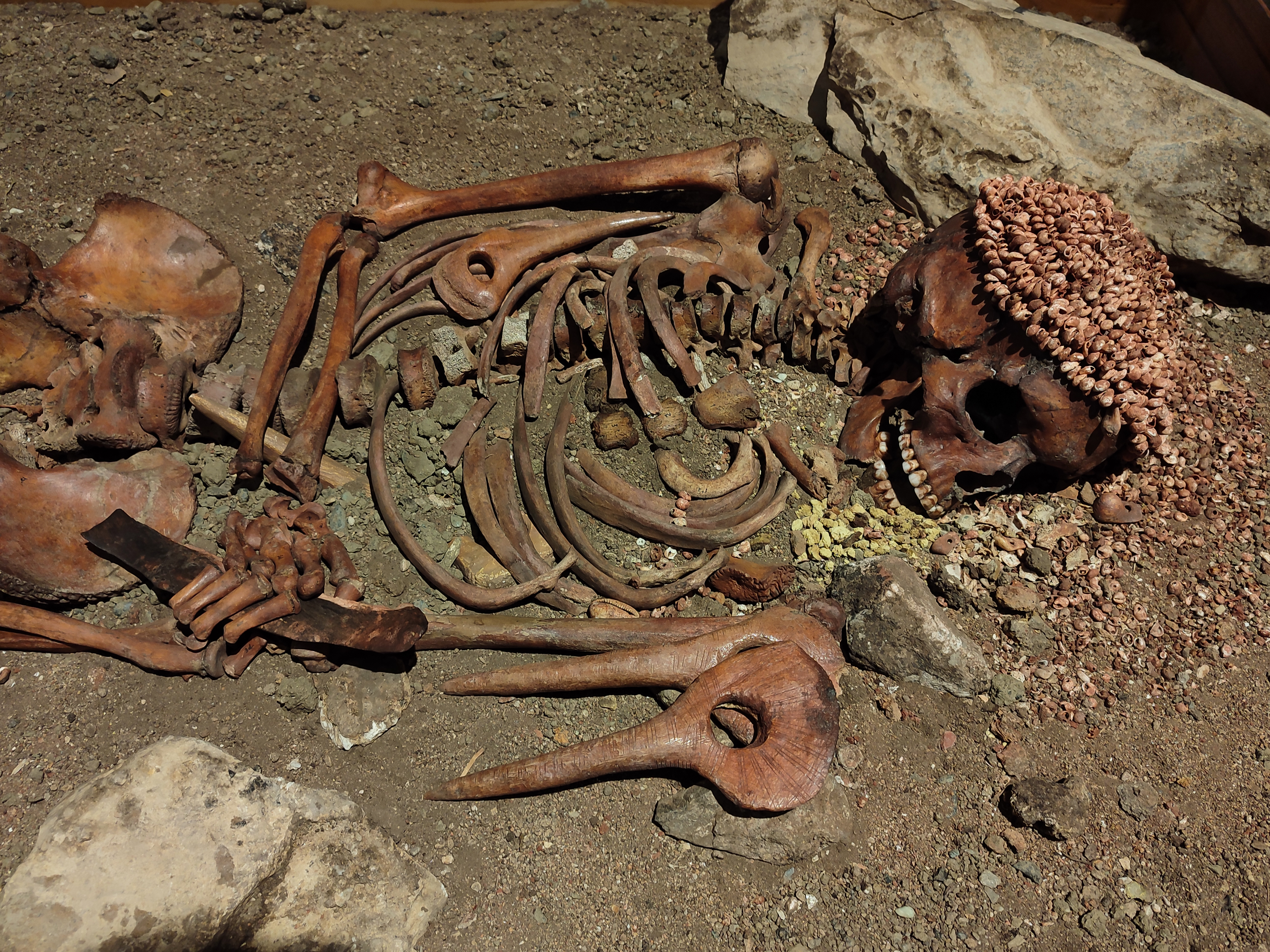
Burial of an adolescent from the Upper Palaeolithic (29,000 years), having led archaeologists to nickname him the "young prince". About fifteen years old, he lay on his back on a layer of red ocher seven meters from the surface facing south, he wore a headgear decorated with shell beads and pierced deer teeth and squirrel tails on the thorax (Liguria region).

Copper begins to be mined from the middle of the 4th millennium BC in Liguria with the Libiola and Monte Loreto mines dated to 3700 BC. These are the oldest copper mines in the western Mediterranean basin.

It is believed the ancient Ligurians settled on the Mediterranean coastline, divided in several tribes, from the Rhone to the Arno (so we are told by Polybius), pushing their presence as far as the Spanish Mediterranean coast to the west and the Tiber to the south-east, colonizing the coasts of major islands such as Corsica, Sardinia and Sicily. Numerous ceramic artefacts remain of them.

=== The foundation of Genoa ===
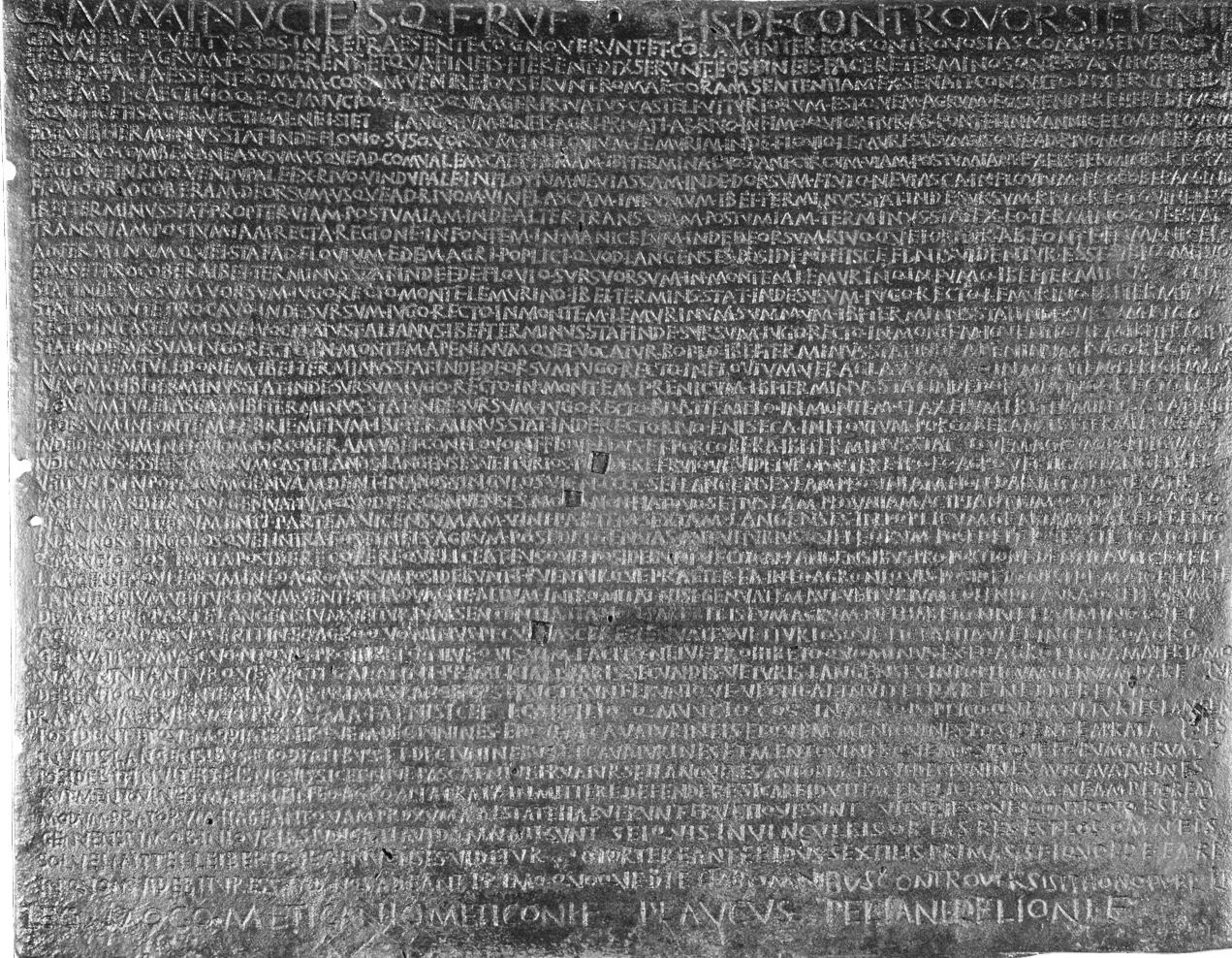
The Polcevera bronze tablet, evidence of Genoa's Roman and pre-Roman past

The Genoa area has been inhabited since the fifth or fourth millennium BC.

In ancient times this area was inhabited by Ligures (ancient people after whom Liguria is named). According to excavations carried out in the city between 1898 and 1910, the Ligure population that lived in Genoa maintained trade relations with the Etruscans and the Greeks, since several objects from these populations were found.

During the 5th century BC, the first town, or oppidum, was founded at the top of the hill today called Castello (Castle), which is now inside the medieval old town. The ancient Ligurian city was known as Stalia (Σταλìα), referred to in this way by Artemidorus Ephesius and Pomponius Mela; this toponym is possibly preserved in the name of Staglieno, some 3 km (2 mi) from the coast. Stalia had an alliance with Rome through a foedus aequum (equal pact) in the course of the Second Punic War (218-201 BC). The Carthaginians accordingly destroyed it in 209 BC. The town was rebuilt and, after the Carthaginian Wars ended in 146 BC, it received municipal rights. The original castrum then expanded towards the current areas of Santa Maria di Castello and the San Lorenzo promontory. Trade goods included skins, timber, and honey. Goods were moved to and from Genoa's hinterland, including major cities like Tortona and Piacenza. An amphitheater was also found there among other archaeological remains from the Roman period.

=== Roman times ===
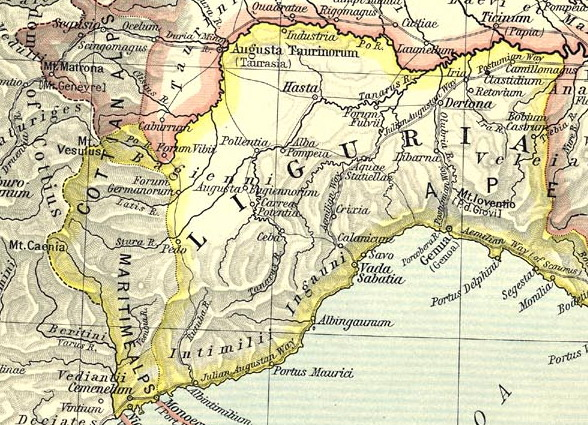
Map of Roman Regio IX Liguria, between the River Var and Magra

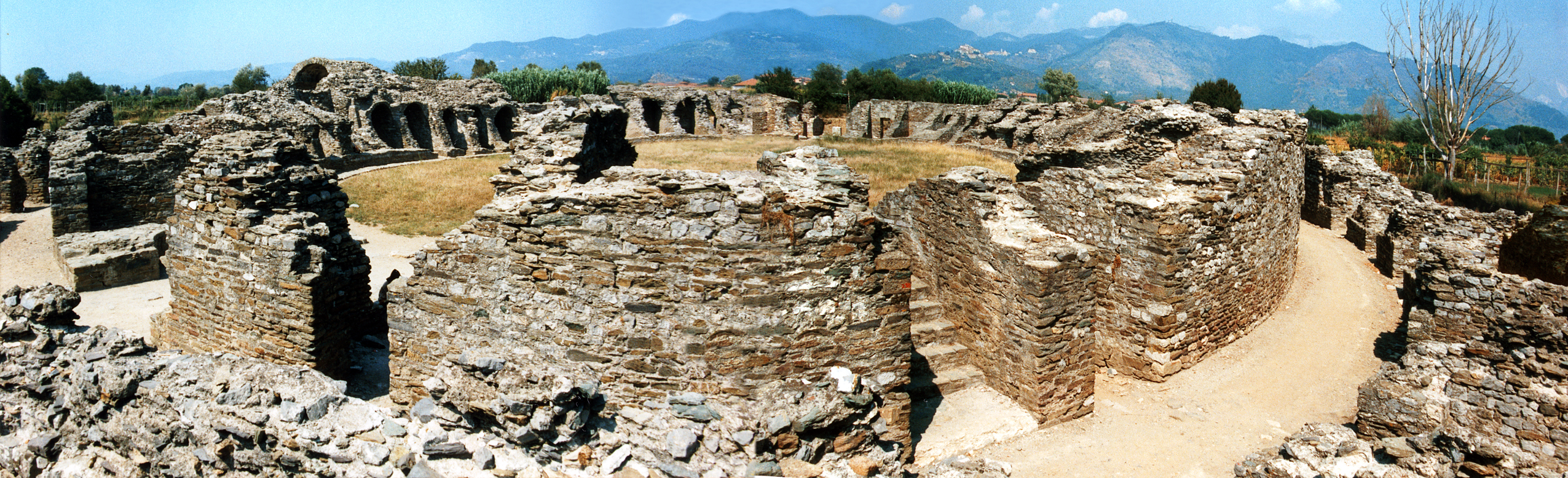
The Roman amphitheatre of Luni (1st century AD)

During the first Punic War, the ancient Ligurians were divided, some of them siding with Carthage, others, including the inhabitants of Stalia (later Genoa), with Rome. Under Augustus, Liguria was designated a region of Italy (Regio IX Liguria) stretching from the coast to the banks of the Po River. The great Roman roads (Aurelia and Julia Augusta on the coast, Postumia and Aemilia Scauri towards the inland) helped strengthen territorial unity and increase communication and trade. Important towns developed on the coast, of which evidence is left in the ruins of Albenga, Ventimiglia and Luni. In 180 BC, the Romans, in order to dispose of Ligurian rebels in their seeking of the conquest of Gaul, they deported 47,000 Liguri Apuani, confining them to the Samnite area between Avellino and Benevento.

=== Middle Ages ===
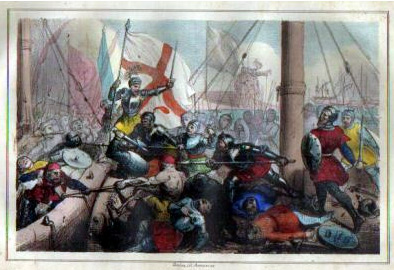
Litograph of the Battle of Meloria (1284)

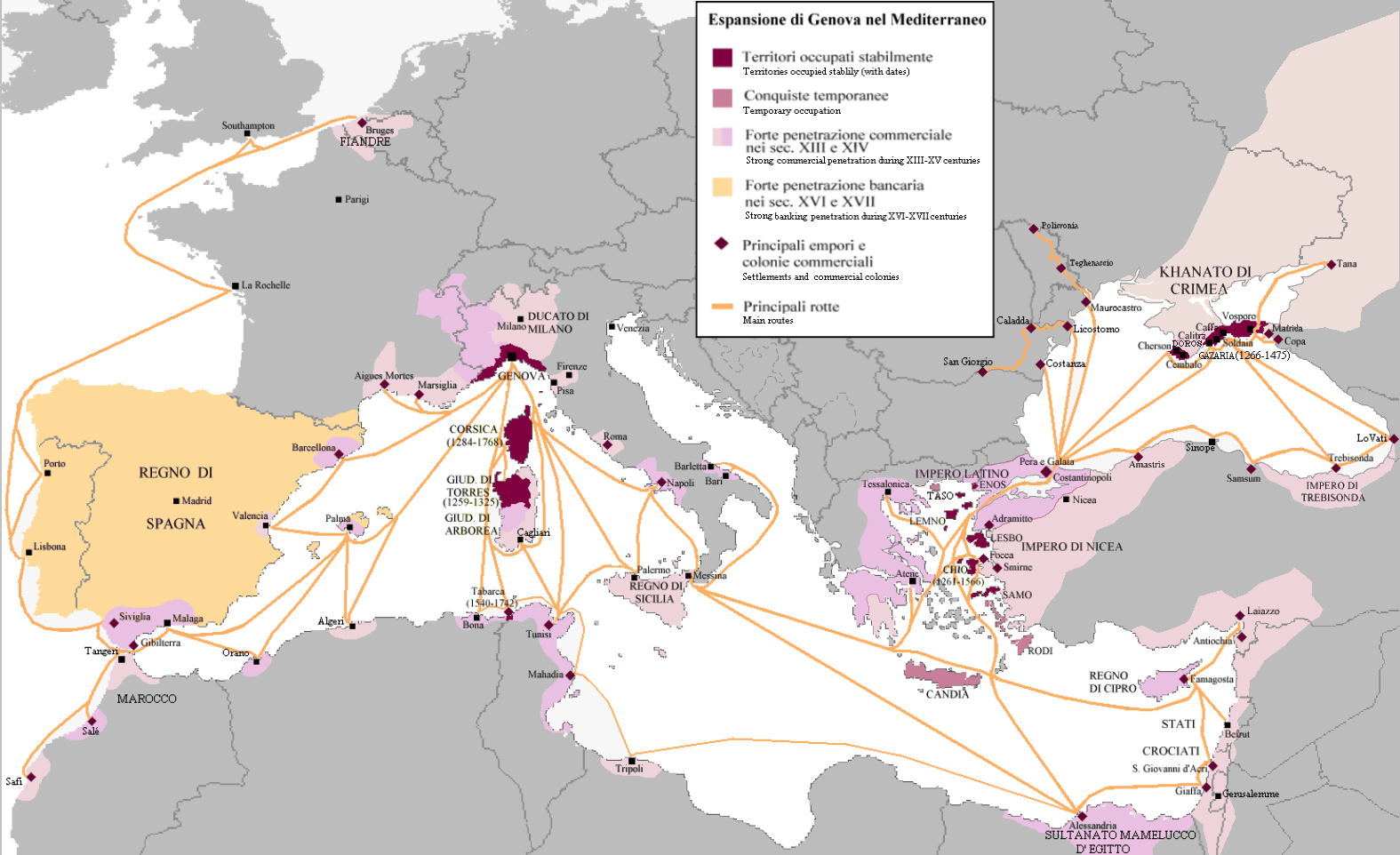
Territories of the Republic of Genoa (shown in purple)

Between the 4th and the 10th centuries, Liguria was dominated by the Byzantines, the Lombards of King Rothari (about 641) and the Franks (about 774). It was also invaded by Saracen and Norman raiders. In the 10th century, once the danger of pirates decreased, the Ligurian territory was divided into three marches: Obertenga (east), Arduinica (west) and Aleramica (centre). In the 11th and 12th centuries, the marches were split into fees, and then with the strengthening of the bishops' power, the feudal structure began to partially weaken. The main Ligurian towns, especially on the coast, became city-states, over which Genoa soon extended its rule. Inland, however, fiefs belonging to noble families survived for a very long time.

Between the 11th century (when the Genoese ships played a major role in the first crusade, carrying knights and troops to the Middle-East for a fee) and the 15th century, the Republic of Genoa experienced an extraordinary political and commercial success (mainly spice trades with the Orient). It was one of the most powerful maritime republics in the Mediterranean from the 12th to the 14th century: after the decisive victory in the Battle of Meloria (1284), it acquired control over the Tyrrhenian Sea and was present in the nerve centres of power during the last phase of the Byzantine empire, having colonies up to Black Sea and Crimean.

After the introduction of the title of doge for life (1339) and the election of Simone Boccanegra, Genoa resumed its struggles against the Marquisate of Finale and the Counts of Laigueglia and it conquered again the territories of Finale, Oneglia and Porto Maurizio. In spite of its military and commercial successes, Genoa fell prey to the internal factions which put pressure on its political structure. Due to the vulnerable situation, the rule of the republic went to the hands of the Visconti family of Milan. After their expulsion by the popular forces under Boccanegra's lead, the republic remained in Genoese hands until 1396, when the internal instability led the doge Antoniotto Adorno to surrender the title of Seignior of Genoa to the king of France. The French were driven away in 1409 and Liguria went back under Milanese control in 1421, thus remaining until 1435.

=== Early modern ===
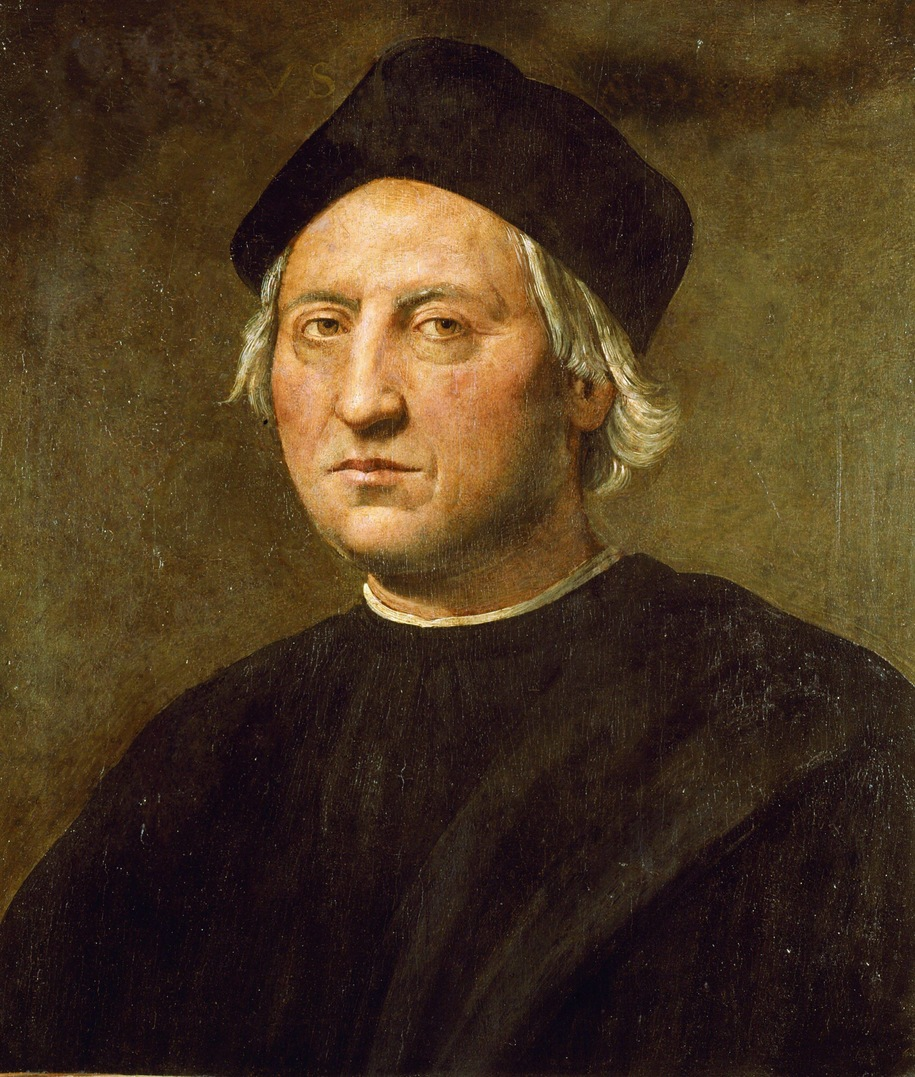
The Italian explorer Christopher Columbus leads an expedition to the New World, 1492. His voyages are celebrated as the discovery of the Americas from a European perspective, and they opened a new era in the history of humankind and sustained contact between the two worlds.

The alternation of French and Milanese dominions over Liguria went on until the first half of the 16th century. The French influence ceased in 1528, when Andrea Doria allied with the powerful king of Spain and imposed an aristocratic government, which gave the republic relative stability for about 250 years.

Genoese explorer Christopher Columbus's speculative proposal to reach the East Indies by sailing westward received the support of the Spanish crown, which saw in it an opportunity to gain the upper hand over rival powers in the contest for the lucrative spice trade with Asia. During his first voyage in 1492, instead of reaching Japan as he had intended, Columbus landed in the Bahamas archipelago, at a locale he named San Salvador. Over the course of three more voyages, Columbus visited the Greater and Lesser Antilles, as well as the Caribbean coast of Venezuela and Central America, claiming them for the Spanish Empire.

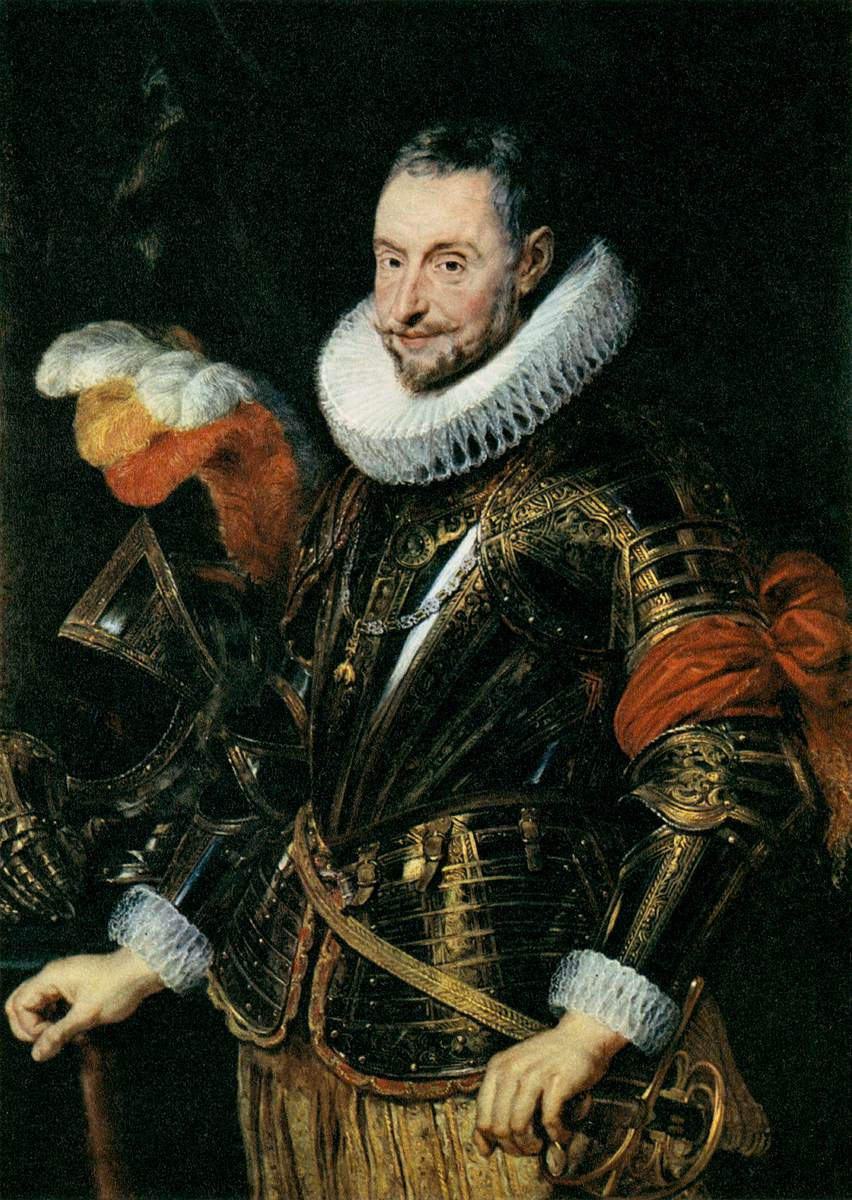
Ambrogio Spinola of the Spinola family, reached the rank of captain-general of the Spanish Army of Flanders and knight of Golden Fleece

The value of trade routes through Genoa to the Near East declined during the Age of Discovery, when Portuguese explorers discovered routes to Asia around the Cape of Good Hope. The international crises of the seventeenth century, which ended for Genoa with the 1684 bombardment by Louis XIV's fleet, restored French influence over the republic. Consequently, the Ligurian territory was crossed by the Piedmontese and Austrian armies when these two states came into conflict with France. Austria occupied Genoa in 1746 but the Habsburg troops were driven away by a popular insurrection. Napoleon's first Italian campaign marked the end of the oligarchic Genoese state, which was transformed into the Ligurian Republic, modelled on the French Republic. After the union of Oneglia and Loano (1801), Liguria was annexed to the French Empire (1805) and divided by Napoleon into three departments: Montenotte (capital Savona), Gênes (capital Genoa) and Apennins (capital Chiavari).

=== Late modern and contemporary ===
A map of the County of Nice western part of Liguria showing the area of the Italian kingdom of Sardinia annexed in 1860 to France (light brown). The area in red had already become part of France before 1860.

After a short period of independence in 1814, the Congress of Vienna (1815) decided that Liguria should be annexed to the Kingdom of Sardinia. The Genoese uprising against the House of Savoy in 1821, which was put down with great bloodshed, aroused the population's national sentiments. Some of the most prestigious figures of Risorgimento were born in Liguria (Giuseppe Mazzini, Mameli, Nino Bixio). Italian patriot and general Giuseppe Garibaldi, who was born in the neighbouring Nice (then part of the Sardinian state), started his Expedition of the Thousand on the evening of 5 May 1860 from a rock in Quarto, a quarter of Genoa.

In the late 19th and early 20th centuries, the region's economic growth was remarkable: steel mills and ship yards flourished along the coast from Imperia to La Spezia, while the port of Genoa became the main commercial hub of industrializing Northern Italy. During the Second World War, Liguria experienced heavy bombings, hunger and two years of occupation by the German troops, against whom a liberation struggle was led—among the most effective in Italy. When Allied troops eventually entered Genoa, they were welcomed by Italian partisans who, in a successful insurrection, had freed the city and accepted the surrender of the local German command. For this feat, the city was awarded the gold medal for military valour.

== Geography ==
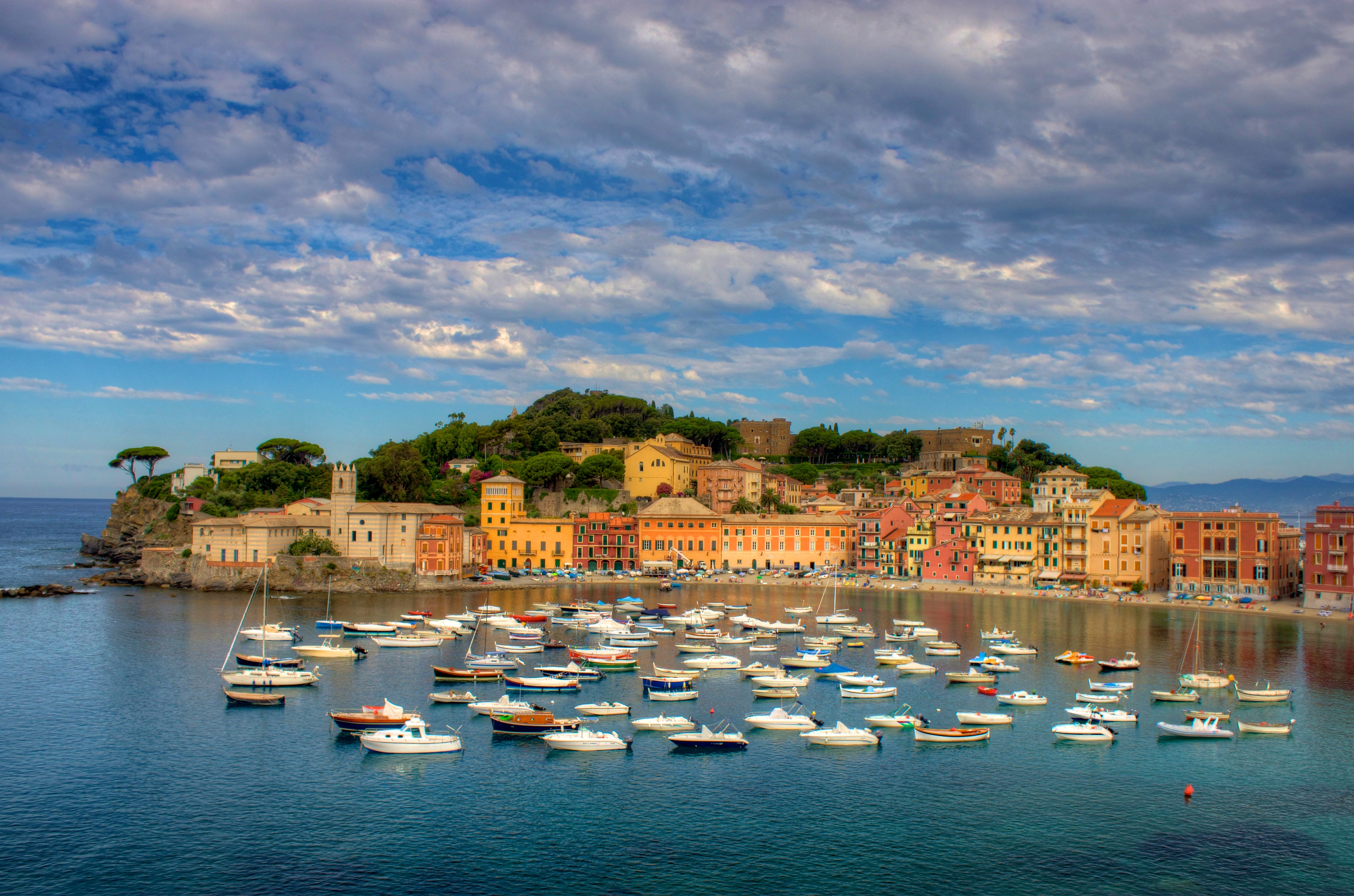
A view of Sestri Levante

The narrow strip of land is bordered by the sea, the Alps and the Apennine Mountains. Some mountains rise above 2,000 m (6,600 ft); the watershed line runs at an average altitude of about 1,000 m (3,300 ft). The highest point of the region is the summit of Monte Saccarello (2,201 m; 7,221 ft).

Liguria is the third smallest Italian region after Aosta Valley and Molise, but is also one of the most densely populated, with a population density of 287 inhabitants/km^{2}, much higher than the national average, and is fourth place after Campania, Lombardy and Lazio. However, there is much difference between inland mountain areas and coastal areas.

The region is crossed east to west by the Ligurian Alps and the Ligurian Apennines that form an interrupted chain, but discontinuous in its morphology, with stretches where the Alpine/Apennine ridge is extremely compact and high aligning very high mountain groups (north to Ventimiglia, a series of massifs which became French after the Second World War, rises up to altitudes of 2700–3000 m) while in other stretches (for example in the hinterland of Savona and Genoa) the mountain barrier is not very high and deeply crossed by short valleys and passes that do not reach 500 m above sea level (Bochetta di Altare, Passo dei Giovi, Crocetta d'Orero).

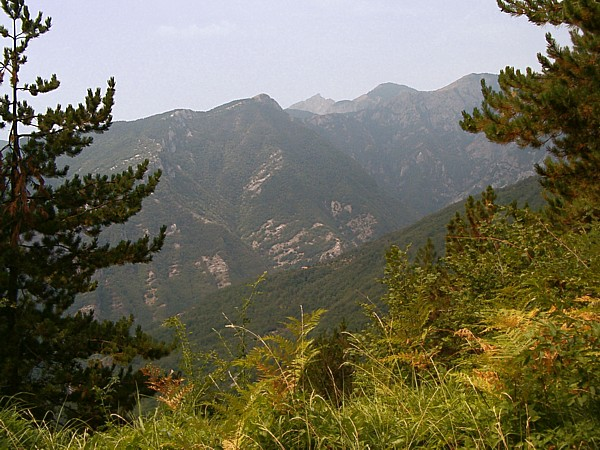
Ligurian Alps

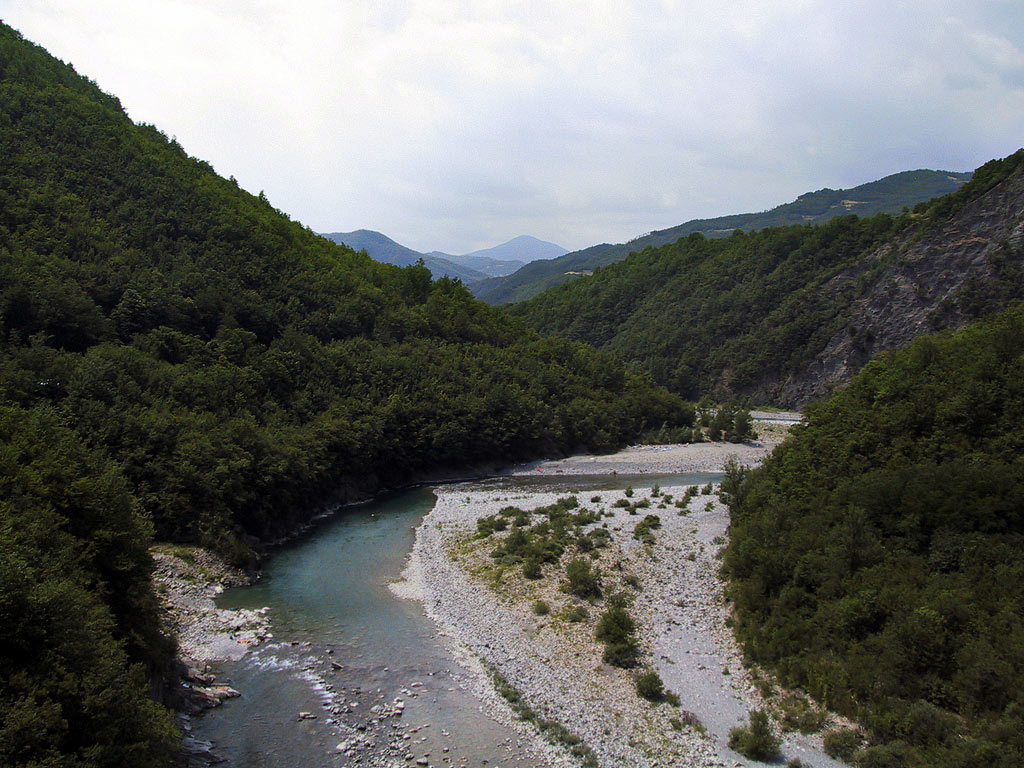
Apennine Mountains and Trebbia river

The winding arched extension goes from Ventimiglia to La Spezia. Of this, 3,524.08 km^{2} (1,360.65 sq mi) are mountainous (65% of the total) and 891.95 km^{2} (344.38 sq mi) are hills (35% of the total). Liguria's natural reserves cover 12% of the entire region, or 600 km^{2} (230 sq mi) of land. They are made up of one national reserve, six large parks, two smaller parks and three nature reserves.

The continental shelf is very narrow and so steep it descends almost immediately to considerable depths along its 350-kilometre (220 mi) coastline. Except for the Portovenere and Portofino promontories, the coast is generally not very jagged and is often high. At the mouths of the biggest watercourses are small beaches, but there are no deep bays and natural harbours except at Genoa and La Spezia.

The hills lying immediately beyond the coast together with the sea account for a mild climate year-round. Average winter temperatures are 7 to 10 °C (45 to 50 °F) and summer temperatures are 23 to 24 °C (73 to 75 °F), which make for a pleasant stay even in the dead of winter. Rainfall can be abundant at times, as mountains very close to the coast create an orographic effect. Genoa and La Spezia can see up to 2,000 mm (80 in) of rain in a year; other areas instead show the normal Mediterranean rainfall of 500 to 800 mm (20 to 30 in) annually.

As of 2023, according to the report on land consumption of the Higher Institute for Environmental Protection and Research, Marche and Liguria hold the Italian record for coastal overbuilding.

=== Italian Riviera ===
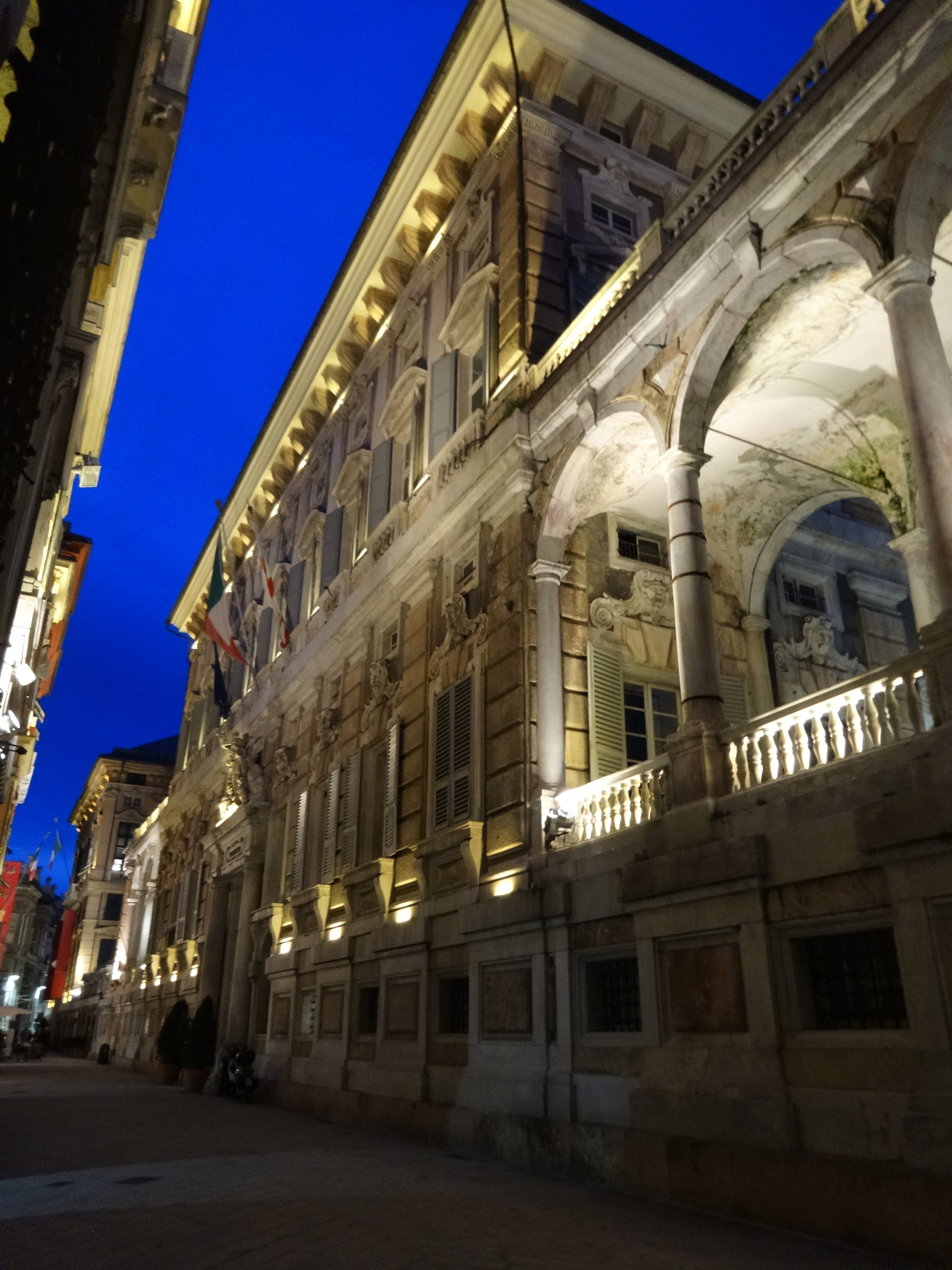
Palazzo Doria Tursi part of the Genoa: Le Strade Nuove and the system of the Palazzi dei Rolli, a World Heritage Site

The Italian Riviera or Ligurian Riviera is the narrow coastal strip in Italy which lies between the Ligurian Sea and the mountain chain formed by the Maritime Alps and the Apennines. Longitudinally it extends from the border with France and the French Riviera (or Côte d'Azur) near Ventimiglia (a former customs post) eastwards to Capo Corvo (also known as Punta Bianca) which marks the eastern end of the Gulf of La Spezia and is close to the regional border between Liguria and Tuscany. The Italian Riviera thus includes nearly all of the coastline of Liguria. Historically the "Riviera" extended further to the west, through what is now French territory as far as Marseille.

The Italian Riviera crosses all four Ligurian provinces and their capitals Genoa, Savona, Imperia and La Spezia, with a total length of about 350 km (218 miles). It is customarily divided into a western section, the Ponente Riviera, and an eastern section, the Levante Riviera, the point of division being the apex of the Ligurian arc at Voltri. It has about 1.6 million inhabitants, and most of the population is concentrated within the coastal area. Its mild climate draws an active tourist trade in the numerous coastal resorts, which include Alassio, Bonassola, Bordighera, Camogli, Cinque Terre, Lerici, Levanto, Noli, Portofino, Porto Venere, Santa Margherita Ligure, Sanremo, San Fruttuoso, and Sestri Levante. It is also known for its historical association with international celebrity and artistic visitors; writers and poets like Percy Bysshe Shelley, Lord Byron, Ezra Pound, and Ernest Hemingway were inspired by the beauty and spirit of Liguria.

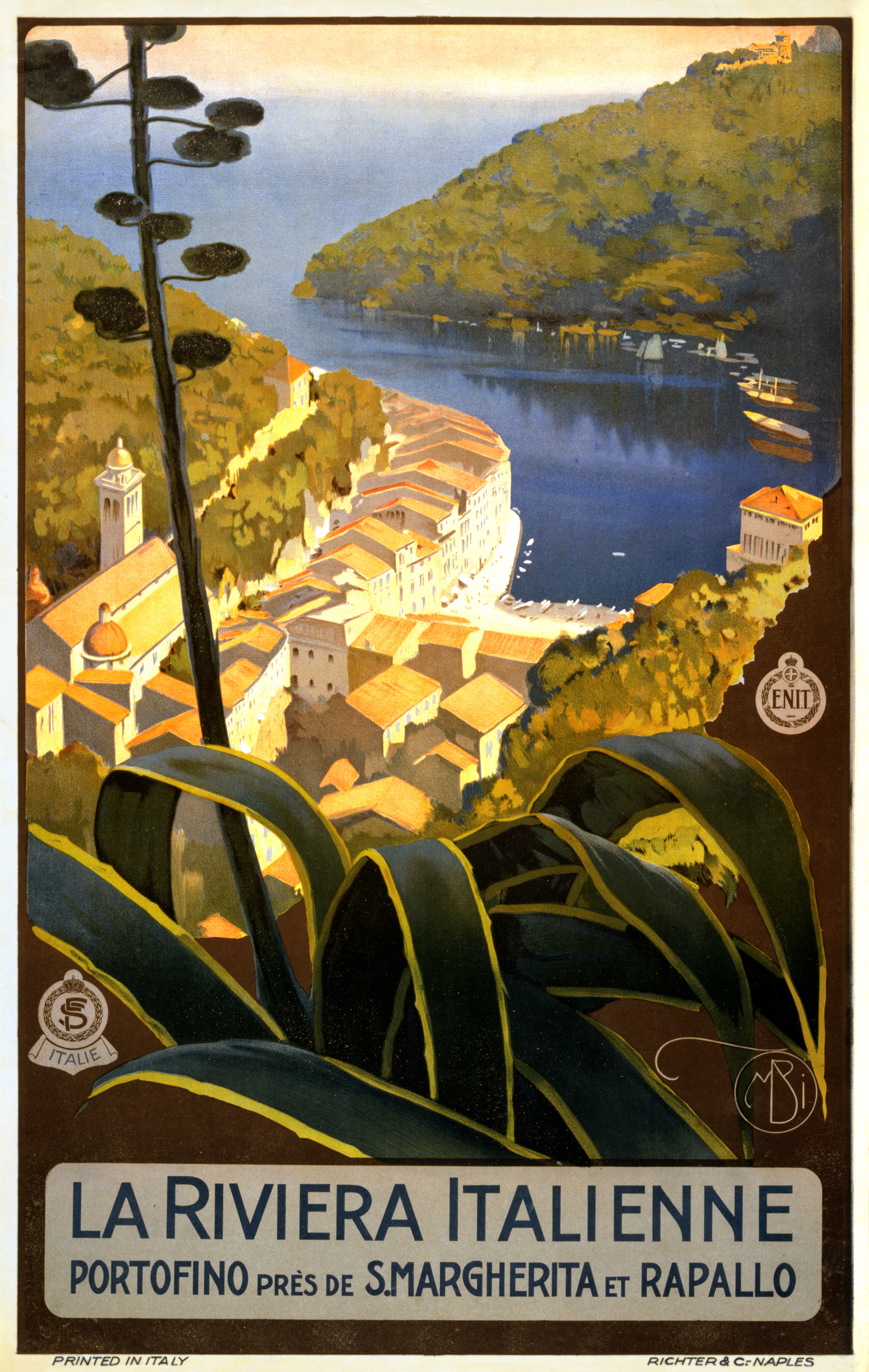
Italian Riviera, travel poster for ENIT, c. 1920

The Italian Riviera gets over 300 days of sunshine per year, and is known for its beaches, colourfully painted towns, nature, food, and villas and hotels, as well as for its resort facilities, major yachting and marinas, festivals, golf courses, sailing, rock climbing and views of old farmhouses and cottages.

Industries are concentrated in and around Genoa, Savona, and along the shores of the Gulf of La Spezia. Genoa and La Spezia are Italy's leading shipyards; La Spezia is Italy's major naval base, and Savona is a major centre of the Italian iron industry. Chemical, textile, and food industries are also important. A number of streets and palaces in the center of Genoa and the Cinque Terre National Park (which includes Cinque Terre, Portovenere, and the islands Palmaria, Tino and Tinetto) are two of Italy's 58 World Heritage Sites.

The Riviera's centre is Genoa, which divides it into two main sections: the Riviera di Ponente ("the coast of the setting sun"), extending westwards from Genoa to the French border; and the Riviera di Levante ("the coast of the rising sun") between Genoa and Capo Corvo. It is known for its mild climate and its reputation for a relaxed way of life, old fishing ports, and landscapes. It has been a popular destination for travellers and tourists since the time of Byron and Percy Shelley.

Many villages and towns in the area are internationally known, such as Portofino, Bordighera, Lerici and the Cinque Terre. Many villages of Italian Riviera are counted among I Borghi più belli d'Italia ("The most beautiful villages of Italy"). The part of the Riviera di Ponente centred on Savona, is called the Riviera delle Palme (the Riviera of palms); the part centred on Sanremo, is the Riviera dei Fiori, after the long-established flower growing industry.

== Government and politics ==
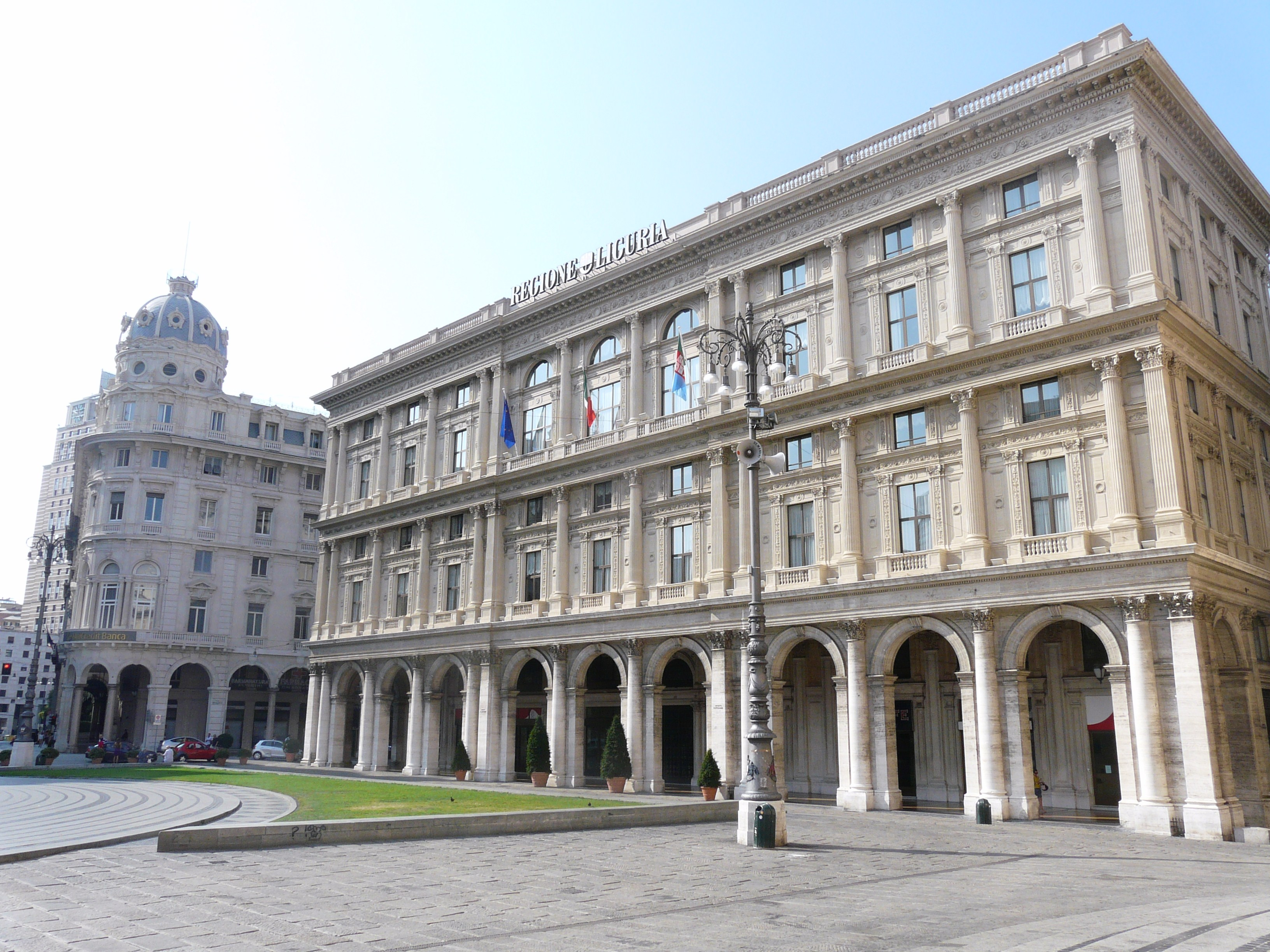
Palazzo della Navigazione generale italiana, the seat of the regional government

The politics of Liguria takes place in a framework of a presidential representative democracy, whereby the President of Regional Government is the head of government, and of a pluriform multi-party system. Executive power is exercised by the Regional Government. Legislative power is vested in both the government and the Regional Council.

The Regional Government is presided by the Governor, who is elected for a five-year term, and is composed of the President and the Ministers, who are currently 11, including a vice president.

The Regional Council has 40 members and is elected for a five-year term, but, if the President suffers a vote of no confidence, resigns or dies, under the simul stabunt vel simul cadent clause (introduced in 1999), also the council will be dissolved and there will be a fresh election.

In the last regional election, which took place on 31 May 2015, Giovanni Toti (Forza Italia) defeated Raffaella Paita (Democratic Party), after 10 years of regional left-wing government by Claudio Burlando (Democratic Party).

At both national and local level, Liguria is considered a swing region, where no one of the two political blocs is dominant, with the two eastern provinces leaning left, and the two western provinces right.

Liguria is one of 20 regions (administrative divisions) of Italy.

=== Administrative divisions ===
Provinces of Liguria

Liguria is divided into four provinces:

Province	Population (2026)	Area (km^{2})	Density (inh./km^{2})	Municipalities
Metropolitan City of Genoa	820,691	1,833.79	447.5	67
Province of Imperia	209,848	1,154.78	181.7	66
Province of La Spezia	214,539	881.35	243.4	32
Province of Savona	266,910	1,546.29	172.6	69

== Demographics ==
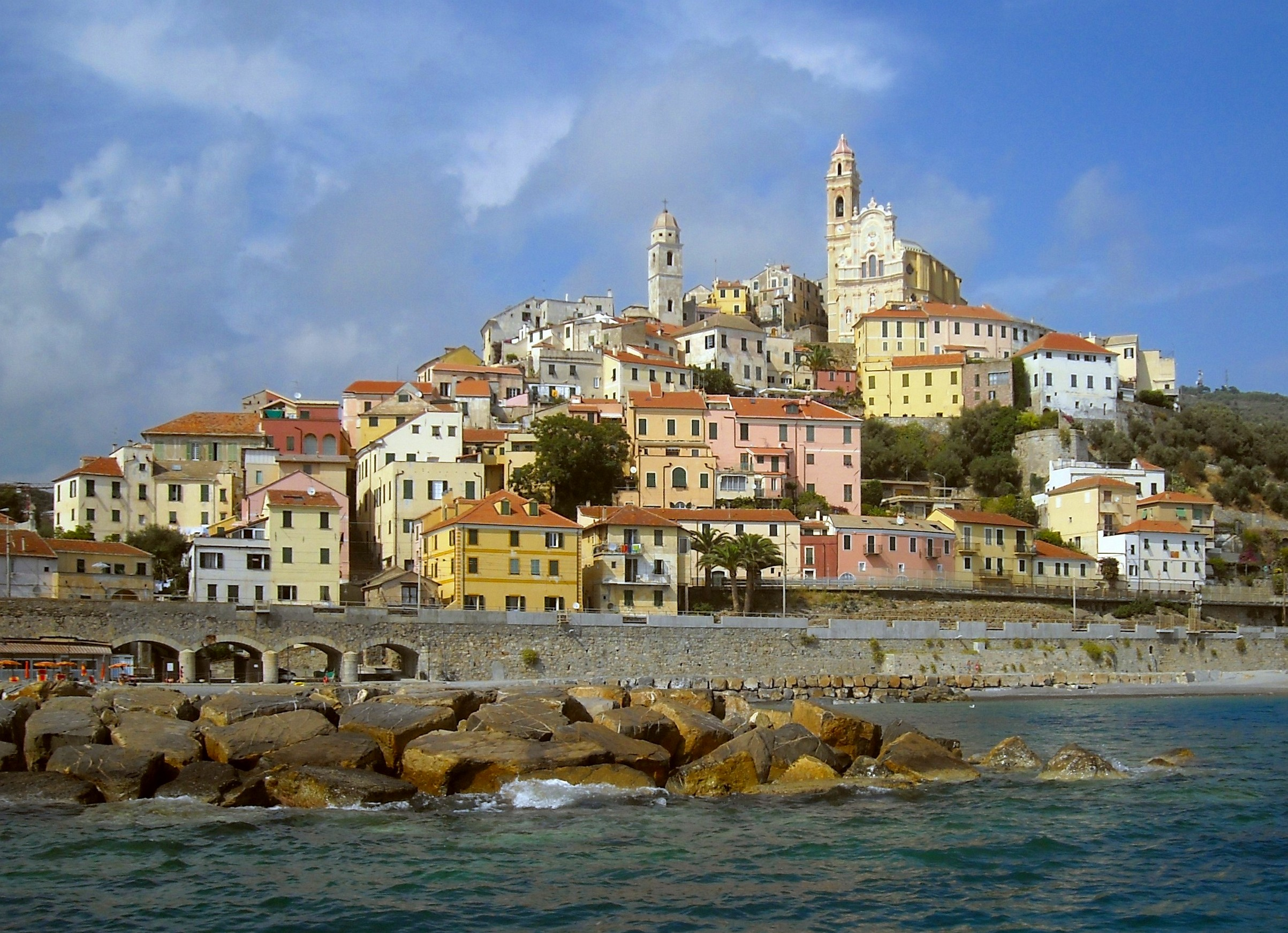
Cervo

Historical population
Year	Pop.	±%
1861	829,138	—
1871	883,864	+6.6%
1881	936,476	+6.0%
1901	1,086,213	+16.0%
1911	1,207,095	+11.1%
1921	1,337,979	+10.8%
1931	1,422,596	+6.3%
1936	1,466,820	+3.1%
1951	1,566,961	+6.8%
1961	1,735,349	+10.7%
1971	1,853,578	+6.8%
1981	1,807,893	−2.5%
1991	1,676,282	−7.3%
2001	1,571,783	−6.2%
2011	1,570,694	−0.1%
2021	1,509,227	−3.9%
Source: ISTAT

As of 2026, the population is 1,511,988, of which 48.6% are male, and 51.4% are female. Minors make up 12.8% of the population, and seniors make up 29.4%.

At 279.2 inhabitants per km², the population density of Liguria is much higher than the national average of 195.1, being only less than Campania's, Lombardy's and Lazio's. In the Metropolitan City of Genoa, it reaches almost 500 inhabitants per km^{2}, whereas in the provinces of Imperia and Savona it is less than 200 inhabitants per km^{2}. The Spanish traveller Pedro Tafur, noting it from sea in 1436, remarked "To one who does not know it, the whole coast from Savona to Genoa looks like one continuous city, so well inhabited is it, and so thickly studded with houses," and today over 80% of the regional population still lives permanently near to the coast, where all the four major cities above 50,000 inhabitants are located: Genoa (population 566,247), La Spezia (92,610), Savona (58,421) and Sanremo (53,157).

The population of Liguria has been declining since the census in 1971, most markedly in the cities of Genoa, Savona and La Spezia. The age pyramid now looks more like a 'mushroom' resting on a fragile base. The negative trend has been partially interrupted only in the last 2 decades when, after a successful economic recovery, the region has attracted consistent fluxes of immigrants.

=== Immigration ===
Foreign population by country of birth (2025)
Country of birth	Population
Albania	28,688
Ecuador	20,616
Morocco	18,628
Romania	17,456
Bangladesh	10,309
Ukraine	8,757
Peru	8,480
France	6,179
Dominican Republic	5,851
Tunisia	5,494
Egypt	4,722
China	4,429
Russia	4,135
Senegal	4,053
Moldova	3,826

As of 2025, immigrants make up 14.4% of the population. The 5 largest foreign countries of birth are Albania, Ecuador, Morocco, Romania, and Bangladesh.

== Economy ==
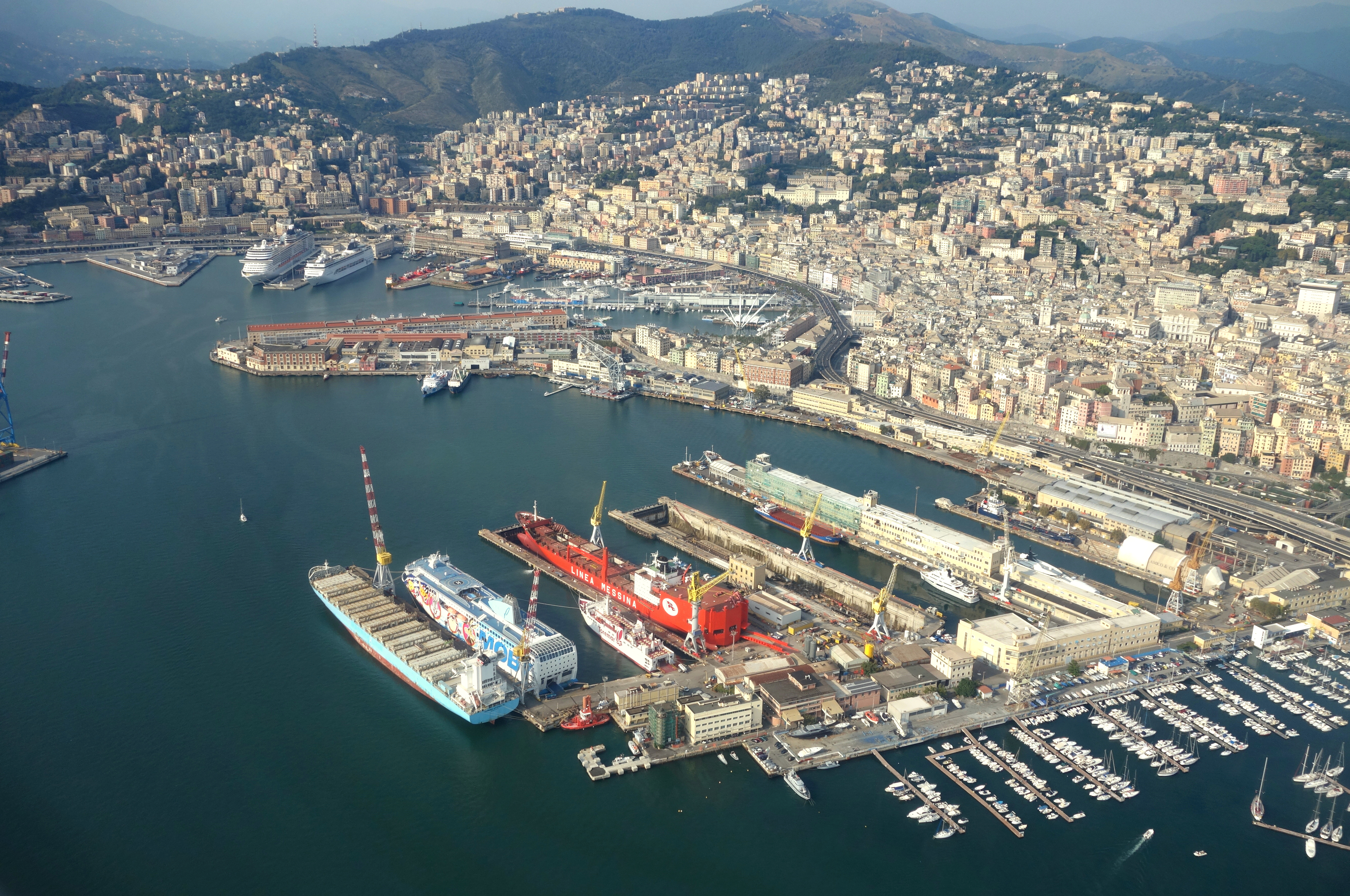
The port of Genoa is the busiest in Italy.

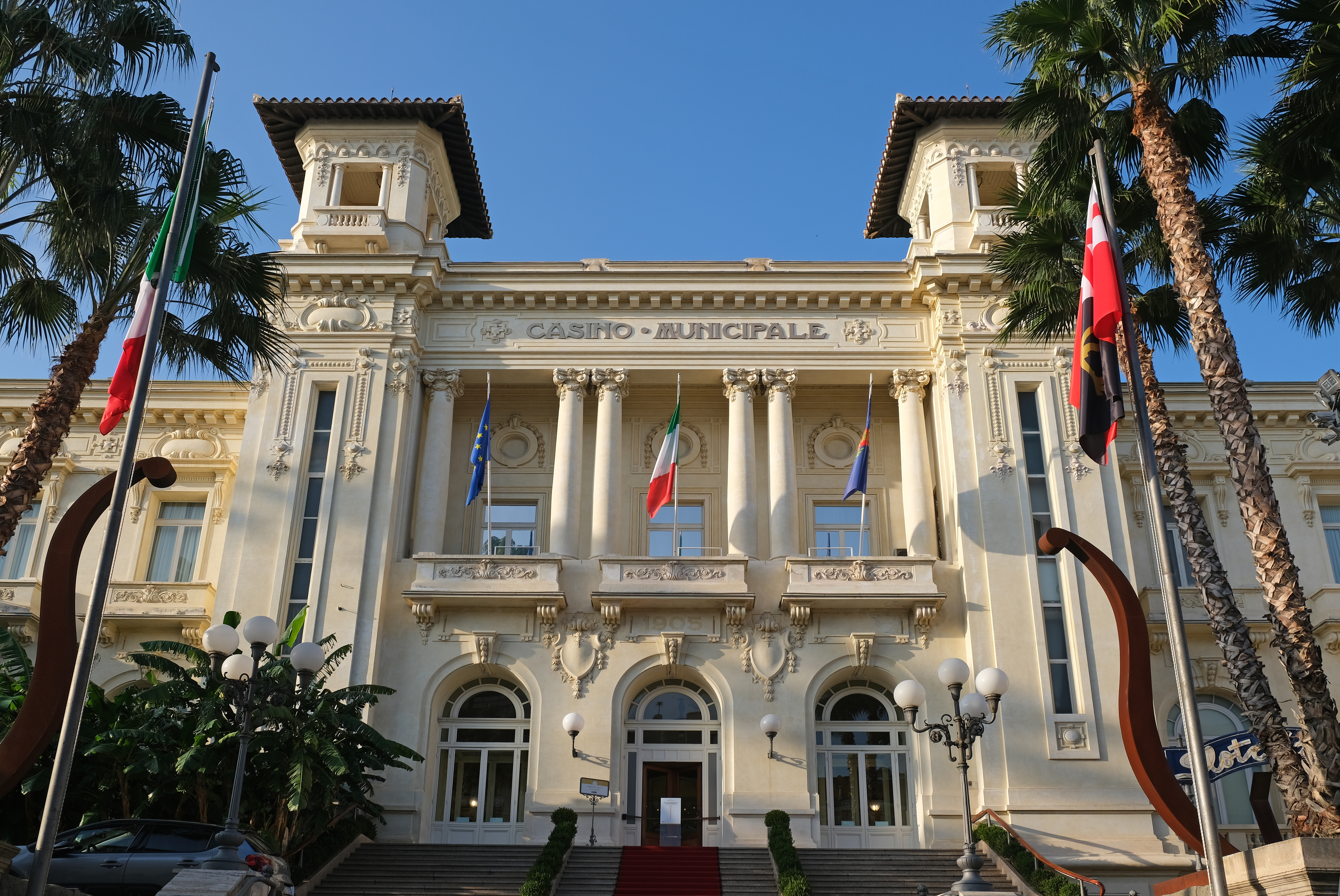
Sanremo Casino

Ligurian agriculture has increased its specialisation pattern in high-quality products (flowers, wine, olive oil) and has thus managed to maintain the gross value-added per worker at a level much higher than the national average (the difference was about 42% in 1999). The value of flower production represents over 75% of the agriculture sector turnover, followed by animal farming (11.2%) and vegetable growing (6.4%).

Sanremo Casino (official Italian: Casinò Municipale di Sanremo) is a gambling and entertainment complex located in Sanremo, on the Italian Riviera. The Casino's building was designed by French architect Eugène Ferret, opening 14 January 1905. Seven different projects were submitted, resulting in the victory of Ferret, who adhered to the Art Nouveau movement. Ferret was also to be the first manager of the proper gaming activities by an agreement signed on 5 November 1903. From 1913 the Casino had its own tram connection. From 1927 to 1934 the Casino was managed by Luigi De Santis who proved to be, among other things, a first-rate gamester for its knowledge of the game and the particularities of the world around it. In the 1930s, Pietro Mascagni, Luigi Pirandello and Francesco Pastonchi were regular clients of the Casino. De Santis invited Marta Abba to Sanremo and offered her the Compagnia Stabile (Theatre Company) of which Pirandello was to be its Artistic Director. It also granted funds to Pastonchi for the organisation and setting up of the Literary Mondays. The Sanremo Casino closed its doors on 10 June 1940. Still, undamaged by the war and two German and allied occupations, the Casino resumed its activities seven months after the end of World War II. From its first edition in 1951 until 1976, the Sanremo Casino was home of the Sanremo Music Festival.

Steel, once a major industry during the booming 1950s and 1960s, phased out after the late 1980s crisis, as Italy moved away from the heavy industry to pursue more technologically advanced and less polluting production. So the Ligurian industry has turned towards a widely diversified range of high-quality and high-tech products (food, shipbuilding, electrical engineering and electronics, petrochemicals, aerospace etc.). Nonetheless, the region still maintains a flourishing shipbuilding sector (yacht construction and maintenance, cruise liner building, military shipyards).

=== Economical statistics ===
The Gross domestic product (GDP) of the region was 49.9 billion euros in 2018, accounting for 2.8% of Italy's economic output. GDP per capita adjusted for purchasing power was 32,000 euros or 106% of the EU27 average in the same year.

The unemployment rate stood at 8.3% in 2020 and was slightly lower than the national average.

Year	2006	2007	2008	2009	2010	2011	2012	2013	2014	2015	2016	2017	2018	2019	2020
Unemployment rate (in %)	4.8%	4.8%	5.4%	5.8%	6.6%	6.4%	8.1%	9.8%	10.8%	9.2%	9.7%	9.5%	9.9%	9.6%	8.3%

=== Wine ===
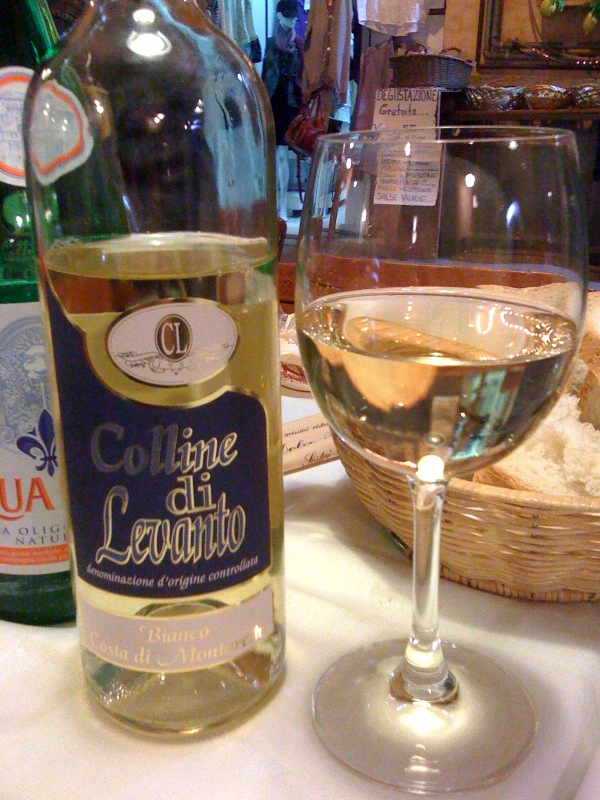
A bottle of Colline di Levanto DOC white wine

Liguria is an Italian wine region located in the northwest region of Italy along the Italian Riviera. It is bordered by the Piedmont wine region to the north, the Alps and French wine region of Provence to the west, the Apennine Mountains and the Emilia-Romagna wine region to the east with a small border shared with Tuscany in the south-east along the Ligurian Sea.

Liguria has several Denominazione di origine controllata regions with the most notable being the Cinque Terre DOC from cliff side vineyards situated among the five fishing villages of Cinque Terre in the province of La Spezia. The DOC produces light white wines made from grape varieties such as Bosco, Albarola and Vermentino. In the west is the red wine-producing region of Dolceacqua, producing wine from the indigenous Rossese grape.

The following is a list of DOCs in the Liguria region along with the grapes that may be included in the blend under varying percentages that are regulated under the DOC label.

- Cinque Terre DOC – White wine only DOC producing wine from the Bosco, Albarola and Vermentino grapes. A passito and liquoroso style made from the same grapes can also be produced under the Sciacchetra designation.
- Colli di Luni DOC – Red and white wine DOC producing wine from Sangiovese, Canaiolo, Ciliegiolo, Pollera nera, Bracciola nera, Trebbiano and Vermentino.
- Colline di Levanto DOC – Red and white wine DOC producing wine from Sangiovese, Ciliegiolo, Vermentino, Albarola and Bosco.

=== Tourism ===
Liguria has many small and picturesque villages, 20 of them have been selected by I Borghi più belli d'Italia (English: The most beautiful Villages of Italy), a non-profit private association of small Italian towns of strong historical and artistic interest, that was founded on the initiative of the Tourism Council of the National Association of Italian Municipalities. These villages are:

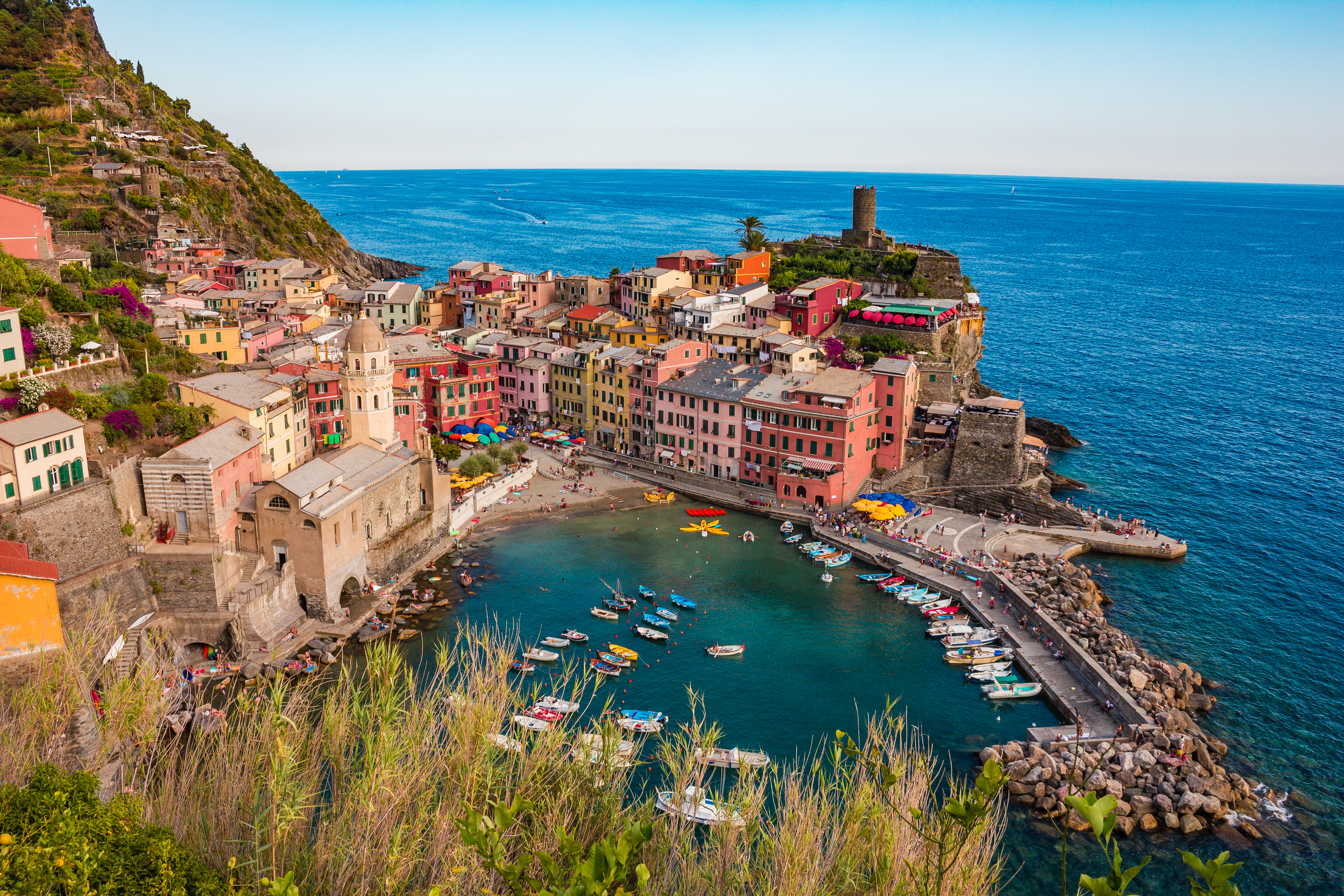
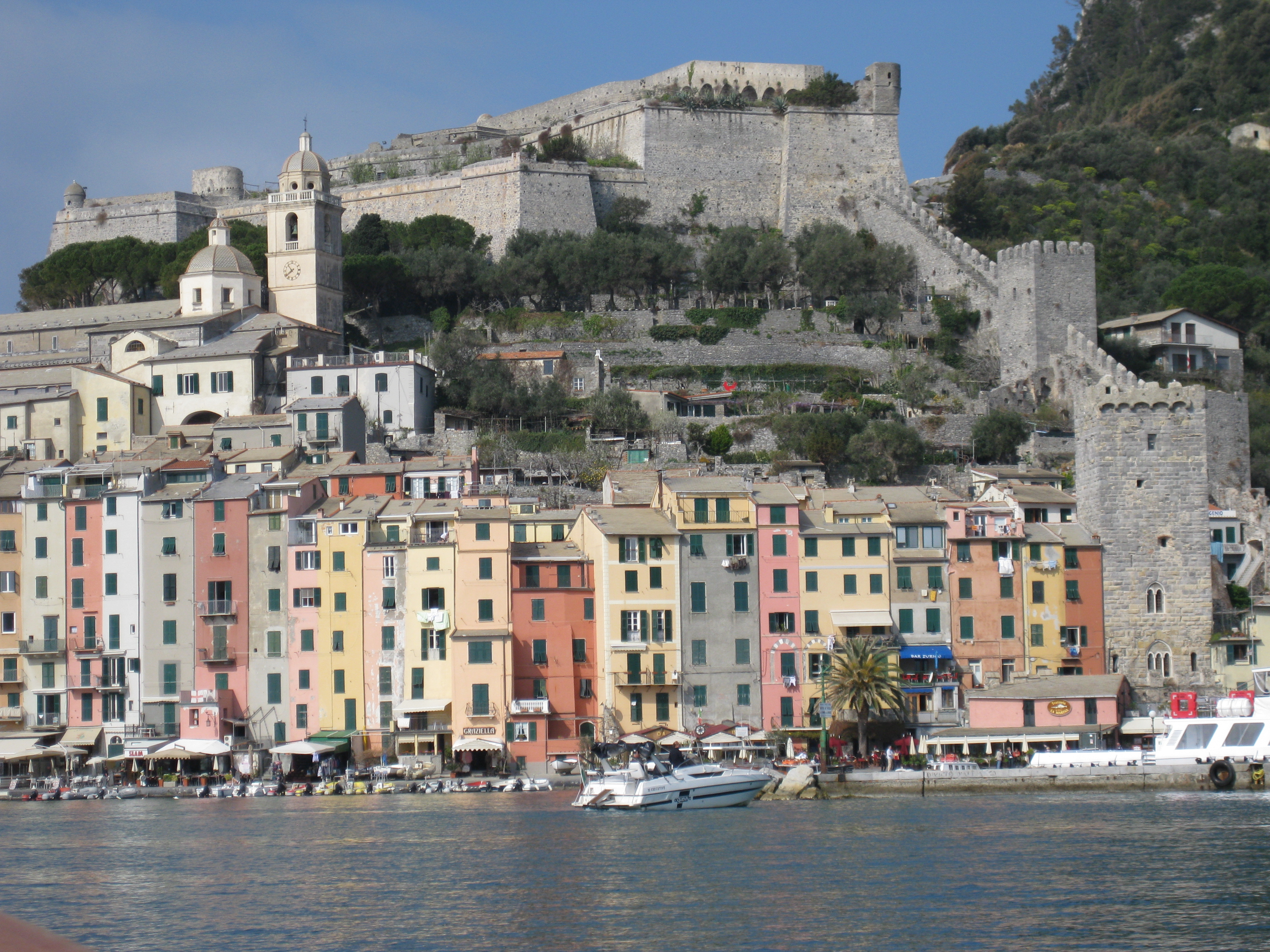
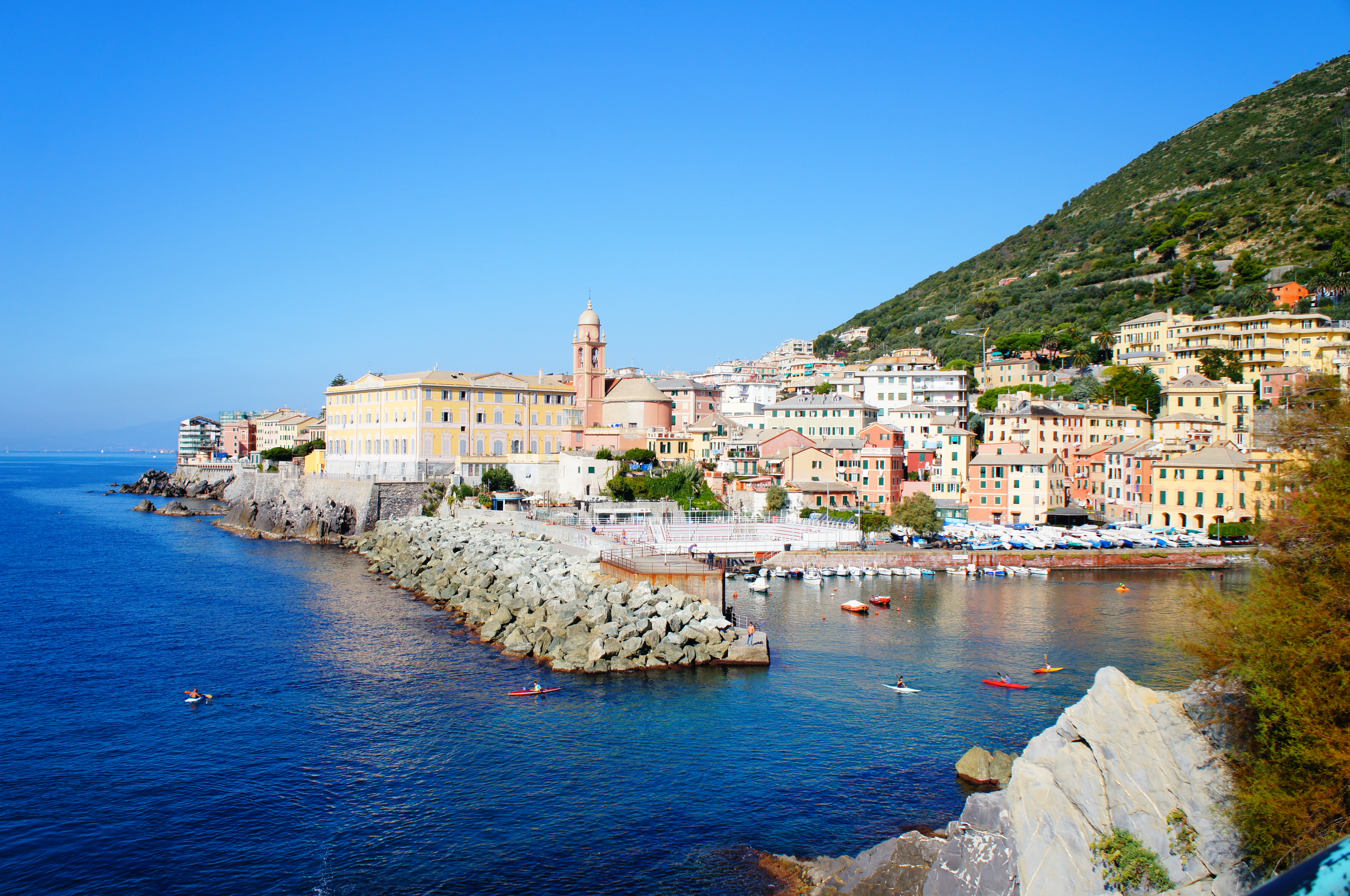
Clockwise from top:
- Cinque Terre on the Italian Riviera, one of the most popular tourist destinations in Italy
- Nervi
- Camogli
- Doria castle overlooking Portovenere
- Apricale
- Badalucco
- Brugnato
- Campo Ligure
- Castelvecchio di Rocca Barbena
- Celle Ligure
- Cervo
- Colletta di Castelbianco
- Deiva Marina
- Diano Castello
- Finalborgo
- Framura
- Laigueglia
- Lingueglietta
- Millesimo
- Moneglia
- Montemarcello
- Noli
- Perinaldo
- Seborga
- Taggia
- Tellaro
- Triora
- Varese Ligure
- Verezzi
- Vernazza
- Zuccarello

== Culture ==
=== Cuisine ===
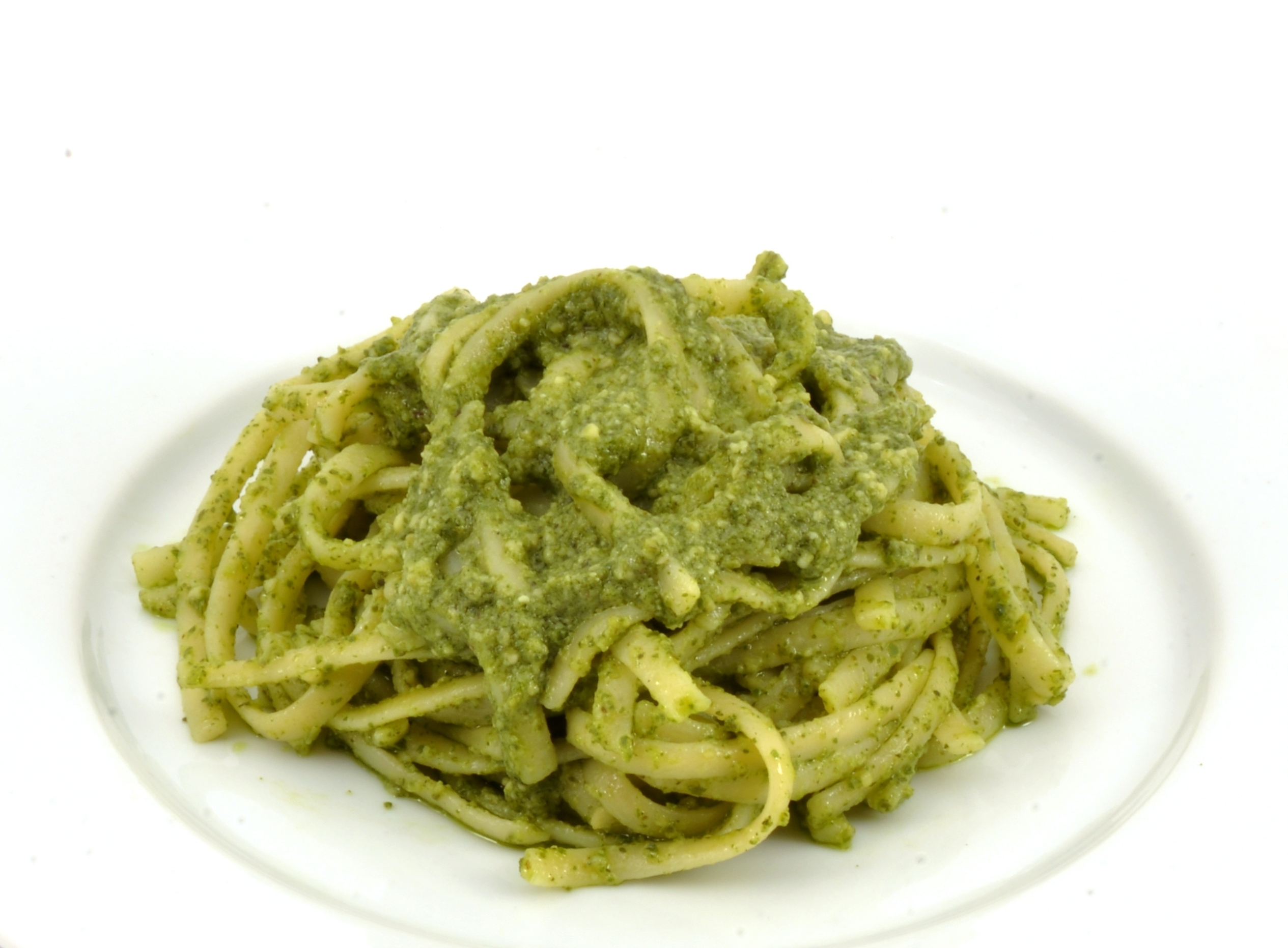
Linguine with pesto

Liguria is the original source of pesto, one of the most popular sauces in Italian cuisine, made with fresh basil, pine kernels, olive oil, garlic and Parmesan cheese.

Seafood is a major staple of Mediterranean cuisine, the Ligurian variety being no exception, as the sea has been part of the region's culture since its beginning. Ciuppin soup is made from fish leftovers and stale bread, flavoured with white wine, onion, and garlic.

Vegetables, especially beans, are important in Ligurian cooking. Mesciua soup is made from beans, olive oil and farro (old kinds of wheat including emmer). The Badalucco, conio and pigna beans are a Slow Food Presidium.

Ligurian pasta includes trenette and trofie, and the fresh pasta pockets called pansòuti.

=== Museums ===
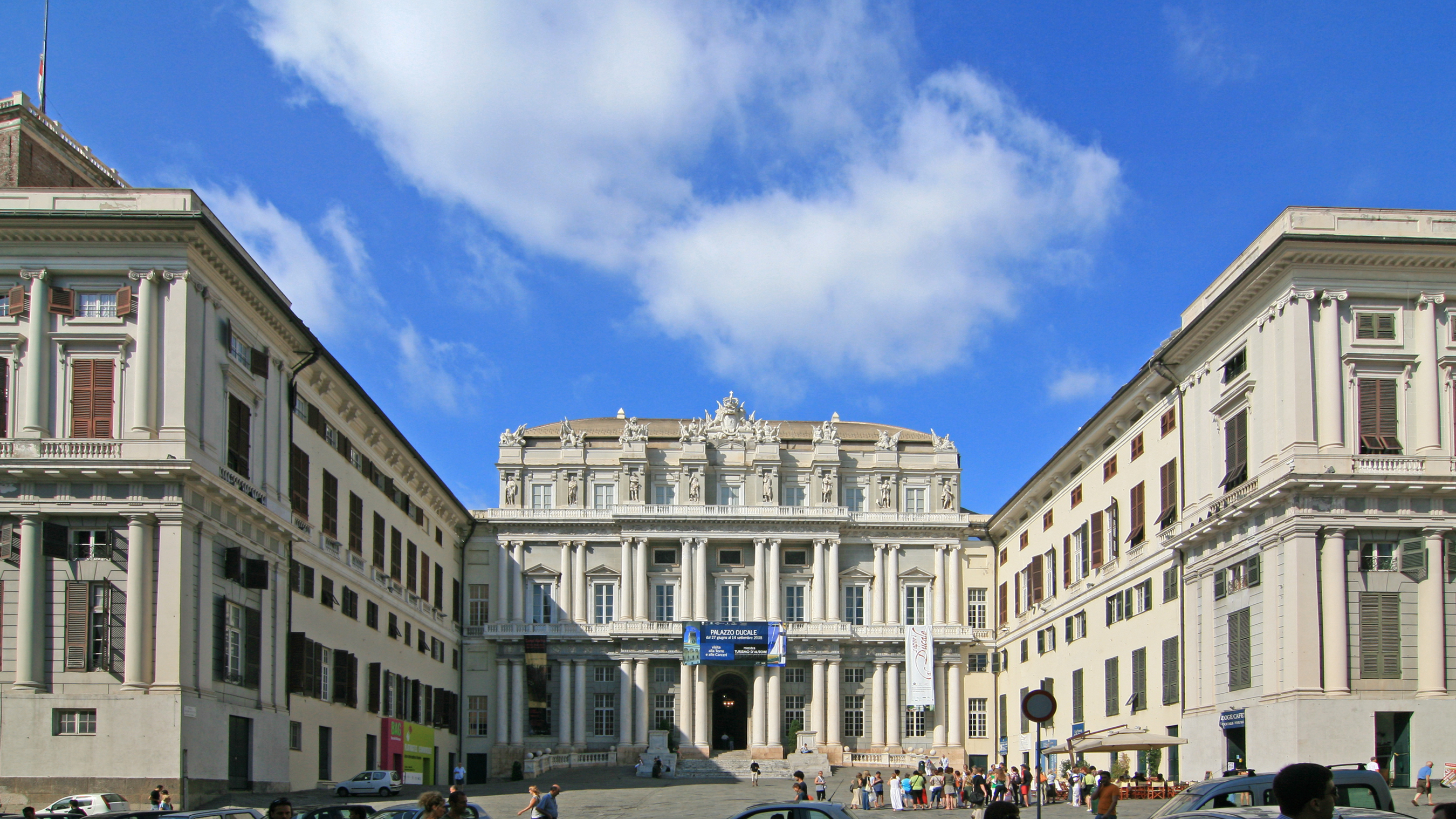
Doge's Palace, Genoa

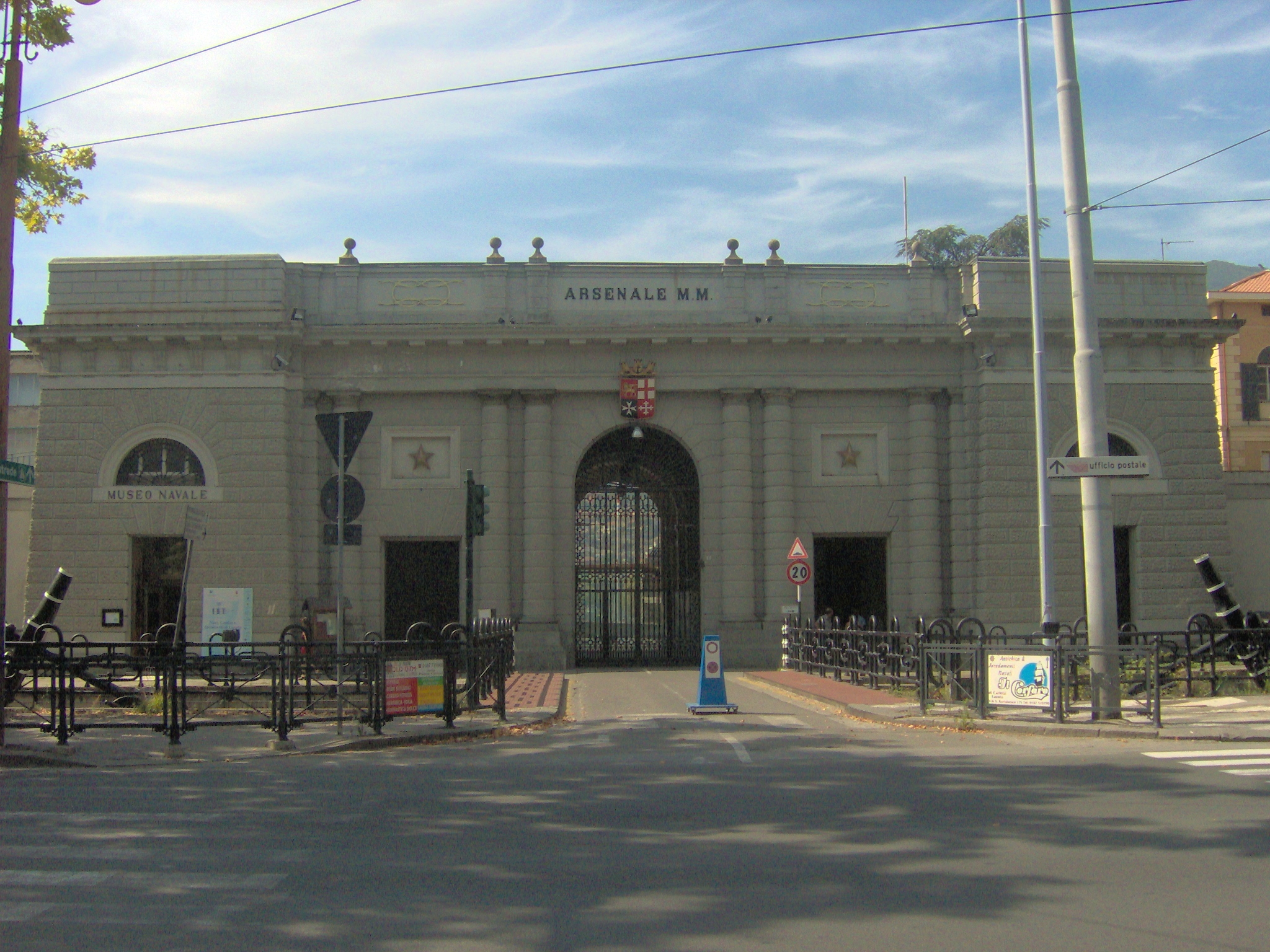
Technical Naval Museum at La Spezia

- Mackenzie Castle
- Lighthouse of Genoa
- Technical Naval Museum at La Spezia
- Istituto Internazionale di Studi Liguri
- Pinacoteca Giovanni Morscio
- Palazzo Bianco
- Palazzo Spinola di Pellicceria
- House of Cristoforo Colombo
- Museum of Contemporary Art, Genoa
- Edoardo Chiossone Museum of Oriental Art
- Diocesan museum of Genoa
- Villa Durazzo-Pallavicini
- Archaeological Museum of Savona
- Palazzo Reale
- Bicknell Museum
- Giacomo Doria Museum of Natural History
- Palazzo Rosso
- Doge's Palace, Genoa

=== Sports ===
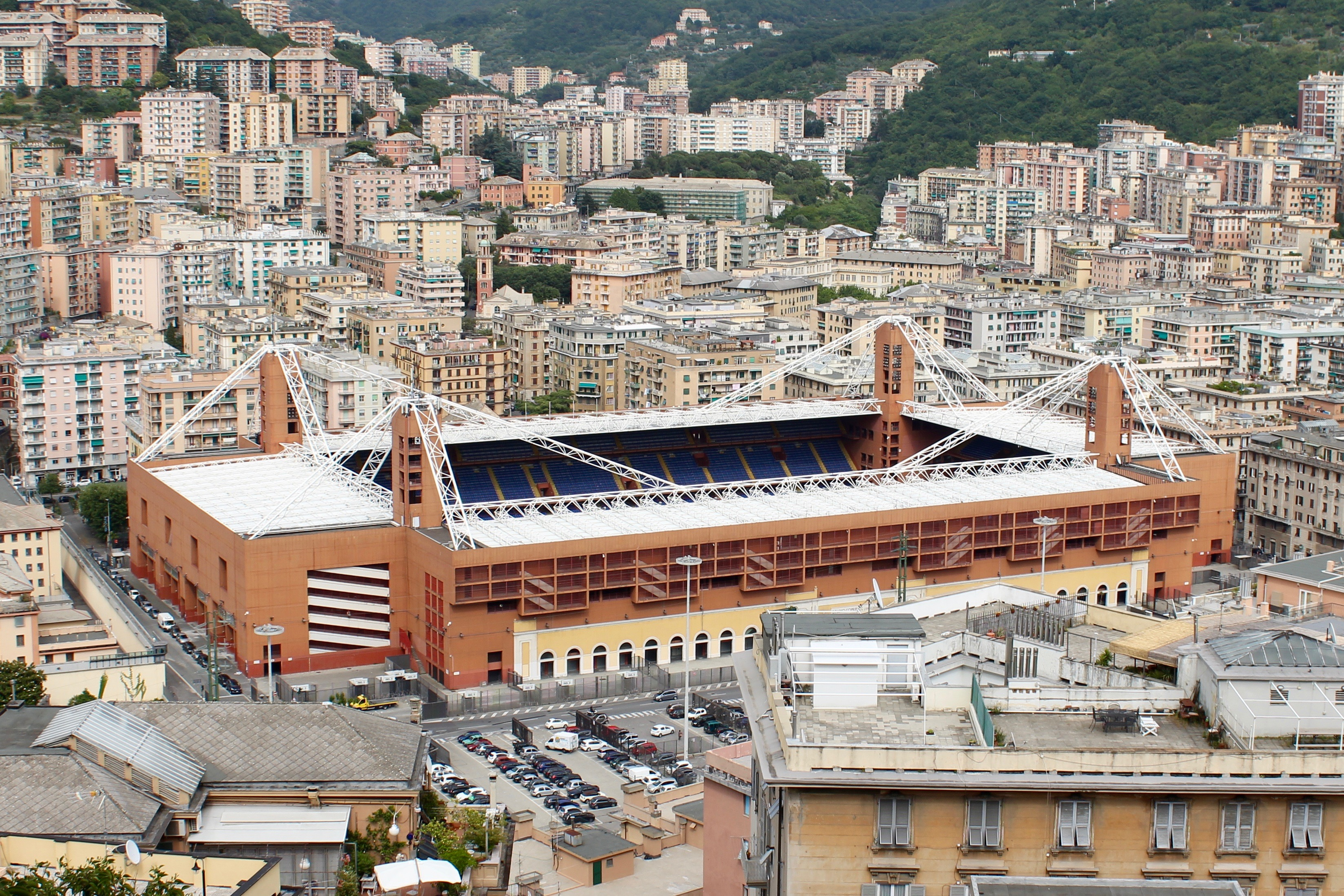
Stadio Luigi Ferraris

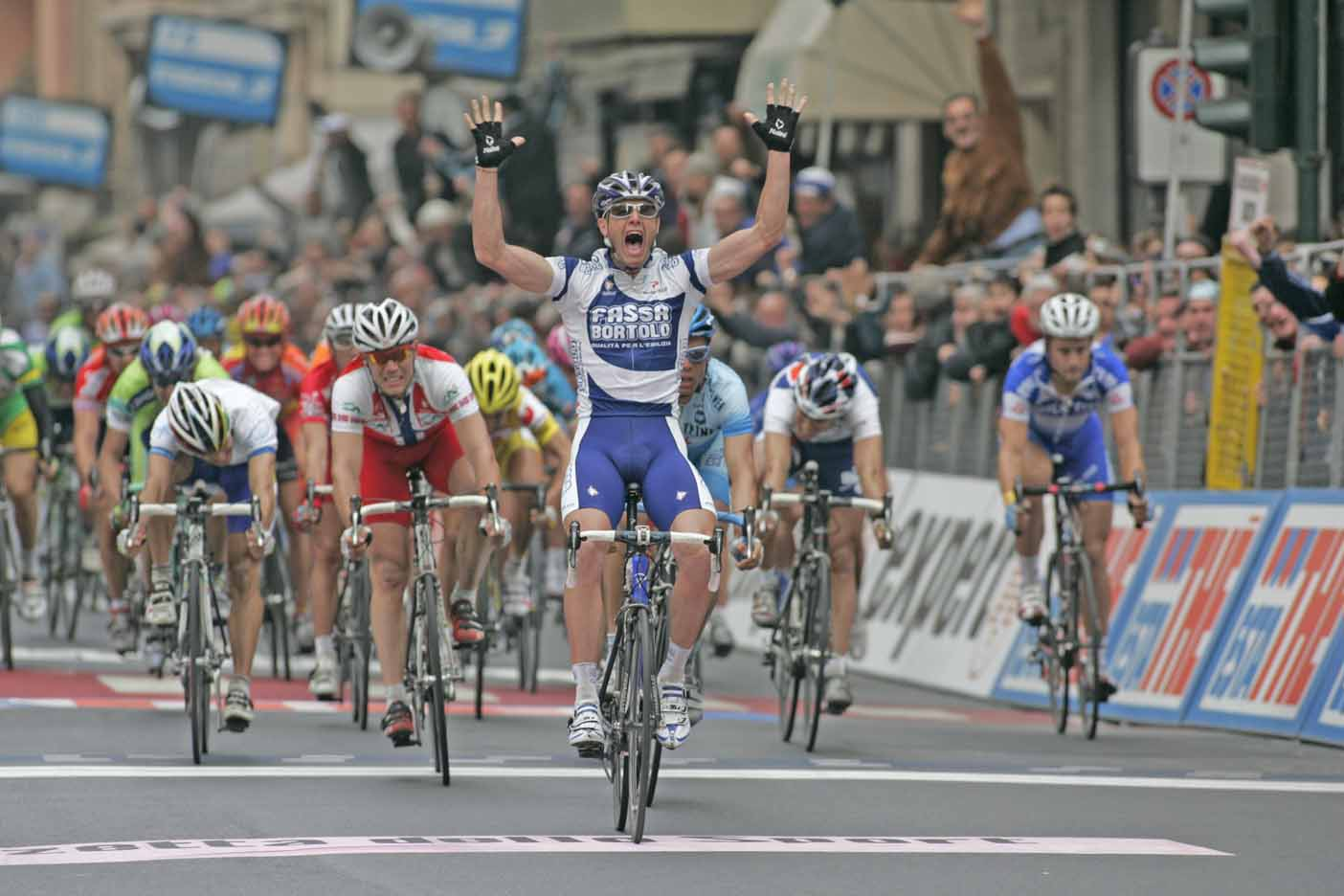
Italian Sprinter Alessandro Petacchi winning the 2005 Milan–San Remo in a group sprint on the Via Roma

The two main men's football clubs are Genoa C.F.C. and U.C. Sampdoria, which have played for decades in Serie A. They share the Stadio Luigi Ferraris, and face each other in the Derby della Lanterna. The third most successful club is Spezia Calcio, which debuted in Serie A in 2020. Pro Recco is a men's water polo club that has a record 36 Serie A1 titles and 11 LEN Champions League titles.

The Milan–San Remo (in Italian Milano-Sanremo), also called "The Spring classic" or "La Classicissima", is an annual road cycling race between Milan and Sanremo, in Northwest Italy. With a distance of 298 km (~185.2 miles) it is the longest professional one-day race in modern cycling. It is the first major classic race of the season, usually held on the third Saturday of March. The first edition was held in 1907. It is traditionally the first of the five Monuments of the season, considered to be one of the most prestigious one-day events in cycling.

The Rallye Sanremo is a rally competition held in Sanremo, Italy. Except for the 1995 event, the event was part of the FIA World Rally Championship schedule from 1973 to the 2003. It was a round of the Intercontinental Rally Challenge and is currently a round of the Italian national rally championship. The first "Rallye Internazionale di Sanremo" was held in 1928. The rally name's French word "rallye", as opposed to Italian "rally", was inspired by Rallye Automobile Monte Carlo. After another successful rally in 1929, the event was given to new organisers who decided to set up a street race through the town of Sanremo instead. The first one, 1° Circuito Automobilistico Sanremo, was held in 1937 and won by Achille Varzi. Rallye Sanremo was restarted in 1961 as Rallye dei Fiori ("Rally of the Flowers") and has been held every year since.

The Piatti Tennis Center is a tennis academy and training center located in Bordighera, Italy, on the Italian Riviera. It was founded in 2018 by Riccardo Piatti. It was the original training base of tennis player Jannik Sinner

== Transport ==
A good motorways network (376 km (234 mi) in 2000) makes communications with the border regions relatively easy. The main motorway is located along the coastline, connecting the main ports of Nice (in France), Savona, Genoa and La Spezia. The number of passenger cars per 1000 inhabitants (524 in 2001) is below the national average (584). In average, about 17 million tonnes of cargo are shipped from the main ports of the region and about 57 million tonnes enter the region. The Port of Genoa, with a trade volume of 58.6 million tonnes is the first port of Italy, the second in terms of twenty-foot equivalent units after the port of transshipment of Gioia Tauro, with a trade volume of 1.86 million TEUs. The main destinations for the cargo-passenger traffic are Sicily, Sardinia, Corsica, Barcelona and Canary Islands.

=== Motorways ===
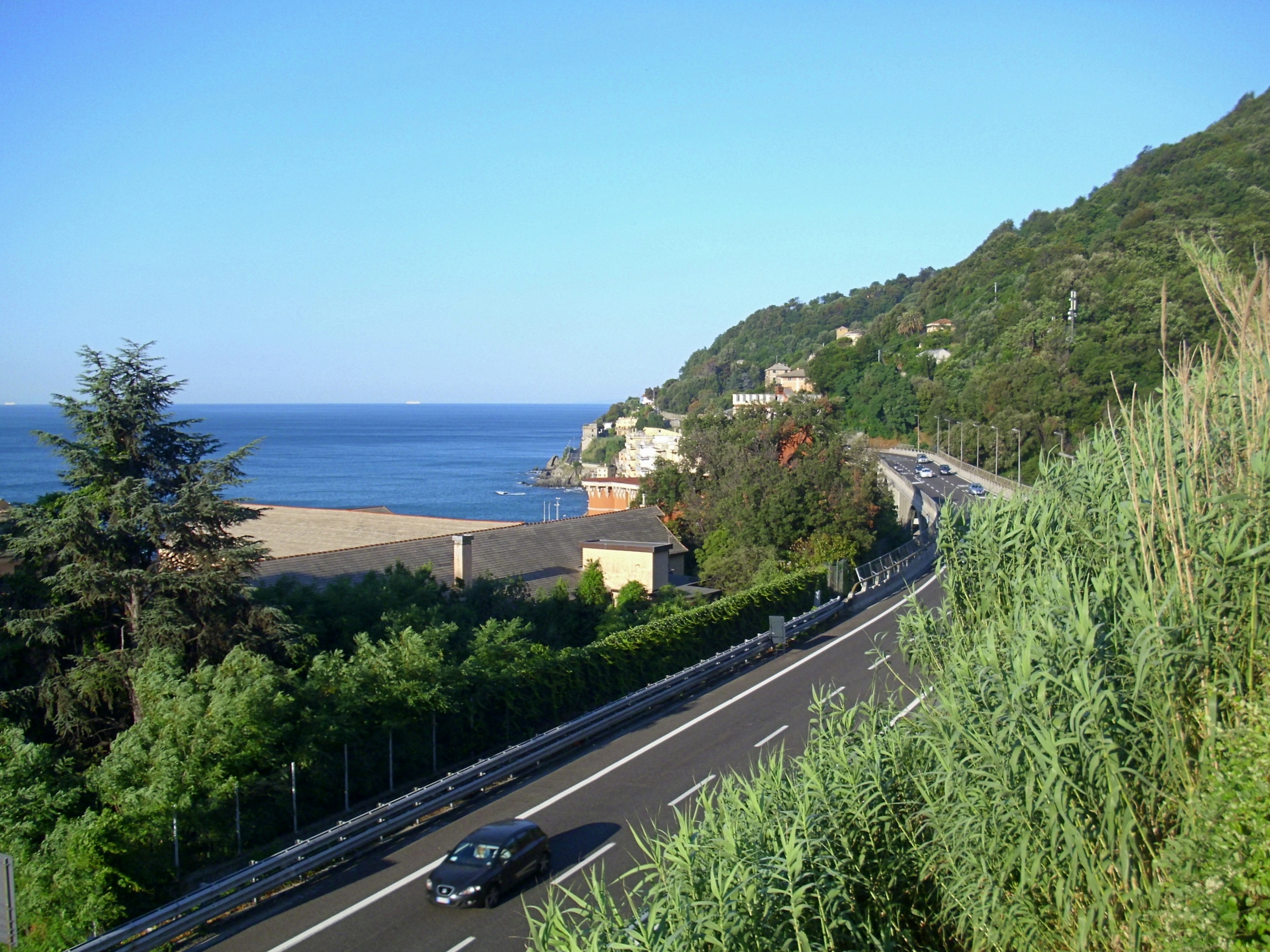
Autostrada A10 near Voltri

- Autostrada A6: Savona-Turin. It is an autostrada (Italian for "motorway") 124.3 kilometres (77.2 mi) long located in the regions of Piedmont and Liguria which connects Turin, the southernmost area of Piedmont, especially the province of Cuneo, to the west coast of Liguria and the city of Savona.
- Autostrada A7: Milan-Genoa. It is 135.5 kilometres (84.2 mi) long located in the regions of Lombardy, Piedmont and Liguria which connects Milan to Genoa. It is a part of the E25 and E62 European routes.
- Autostrada A10: Genoa-Ventimiglia. It is 158.1 kilometres (98.2 mi) long located in the region of Liguria which connects Genoa and Ventimiglia to France. It is a part of the E25, E74 and E80 European routes. It connects to the French A8 autoroute, which finishes in Aix-en-Provence.
- Autostrada A12: Genoa-Livorno. It is 275.4 kilometres (171.1 mi) long located in the regions of Liguria, Tuscany and Lazio composed of two unconnected parts. The first one connects Genoa and San Pietro in Palazzi, the second connects Tarquinia and Rome. The road is one of the motorways on the Italian west coast. It is a part of the E80 European route.
- Autostrada A15: Parma-La Spezia. It is 108.5 kilometres (67.4 mi) long located in the regions of Emilia-Romagna, Tuscany and Liguria connecting Parma and La Spezia through the valleys of the Taro and Magra rivers. It is a part of the E33 European route. The road is also known as Autostrada della Cisa because it crosses the Northern Apennines at the Cisa Pass.
- Autostrada A26: Genoa-Ornavasso. It is 197.1 kilometres (122.5 mi) long located in the regions of Liguria and Piedmont. It is named the Autostrada dei Trafori ("Tunnels motoway") after the numerous tunnels through which it passes, both Apennine and Subalpine. It runs northwards from Genoa on the Ligurian coast, over the Apennines, and across the wide plain of the Po valley to the environs of Lake Maggiore and the mouth of the Val d’Ossola.

=== Highways ===
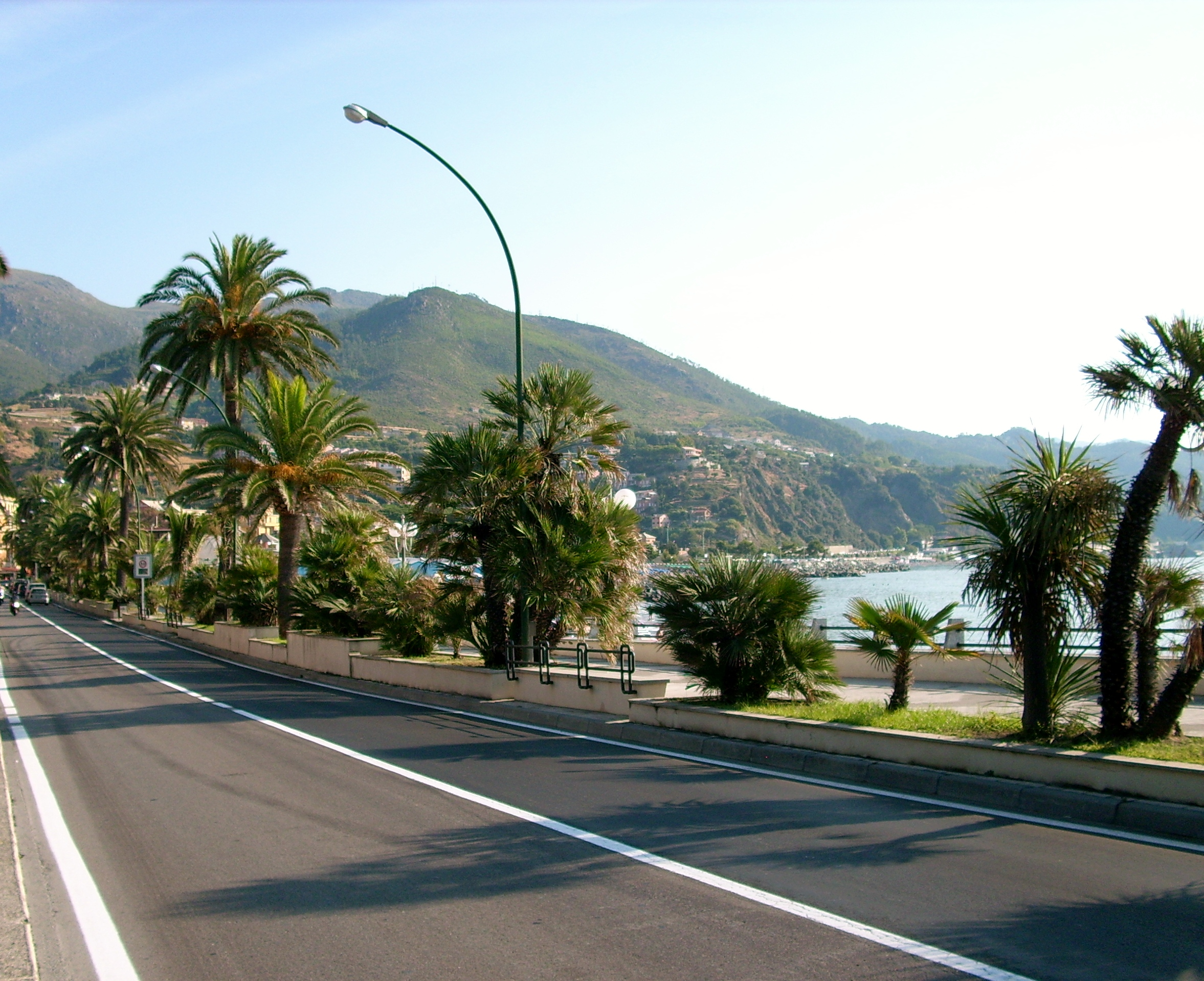
Strada statale 1 Via Aurelia in Arenzano

- Strada statale 1 Via Aurelia: Rome-Ventimiglia. It is an Italian state highway 697.3 kilometres (433.3 mi) long located in the regions of Lazio, Tuscany and Liguria. It is one of the most important state highways in Italy and derives from an ancient Roman consular road, the Via Aurelia. It connects Rome with France following the coast of Tyrrhenian Sea and Ligurian Sea and touching nine provincial capitals as well as important tourist locations. It constitutes a section of the European route E80 from Tarquinia to Rosignano Marittimo.

=== Railway lines ===
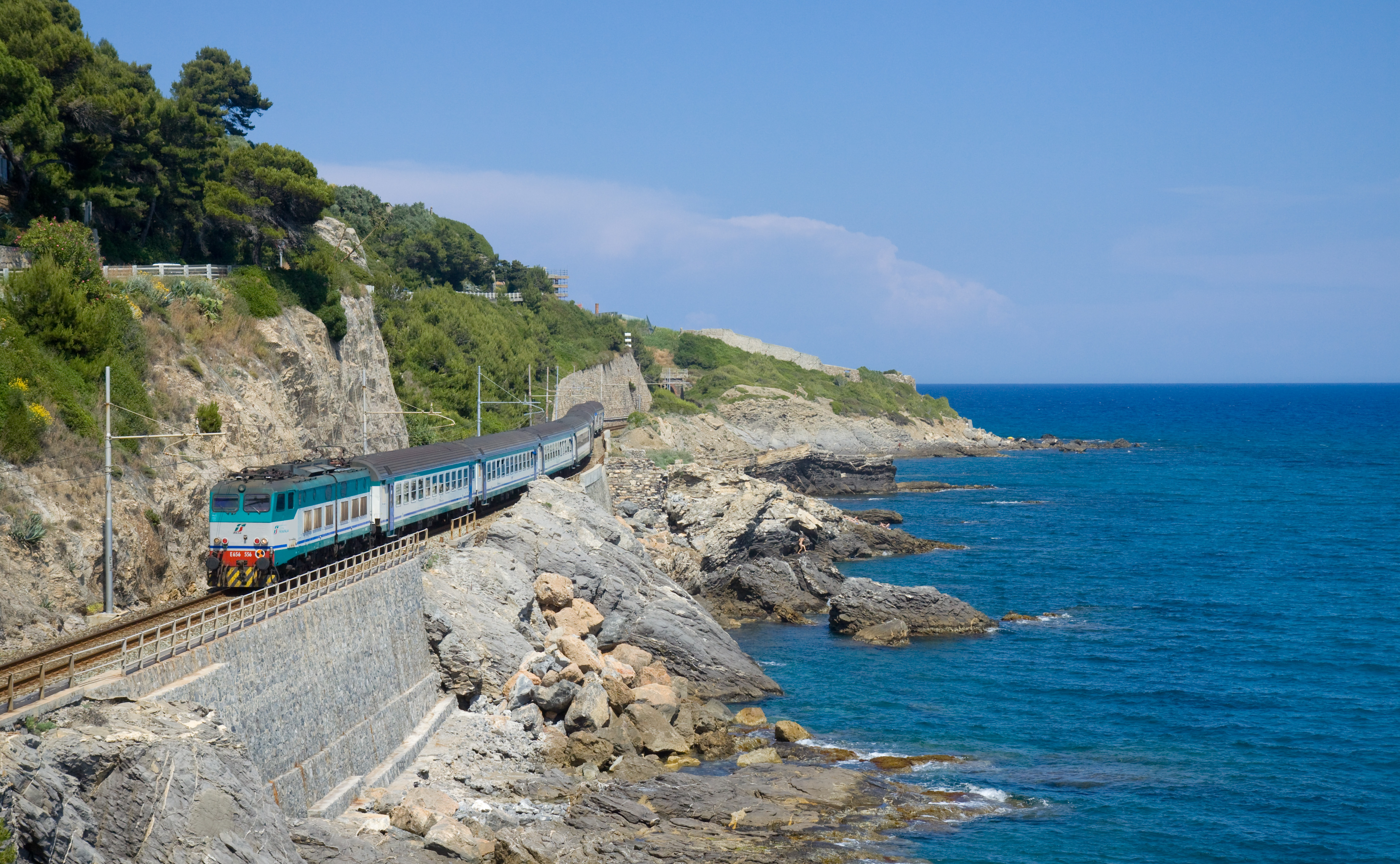
Genoa–Ventimiglia railway

- Genoa–Ventimiglia railway runs along the coast of the Liguria region of Italy. It was opened as a single track line between Genova and Savona in 1868, and between Savona and Ventimiglia in 1872, mostly running along a coastal corniche.
- Genoa–Pisa railway is one of the trunk lines of the Italian railway network. It runs along the Ligurian coast from Genoa to Pisa through the Riviera di Levante and the Versilia. It passes through the cities of Massa, Carrara and La Spezia. South of Pisa the Pisa–Rome line continues along the Tyrrhenian coast to Rome.
- Parma–La Spezia railway is the railway line that connects Parma, Italy with the Genoa–Pisa railway near La Spezia over the Cisa Pass through the Apennines. Its Italian name (ferrovia Pontremolese) derives from the town of Pontremoli, one of the main towns it passes through.
- Tenda line is a cross-border railway line in the Alpine regions of France and Italy, connecting the Maritime and Ligurian Alps. The line includes an 8-kilometre (5.0 mi) tunnel under the Col de Tende mountain pass. The line connects Cuneo and Ventimiglia, both stations in Italy, but it passes through territory now belonging to France. This historical peculiarity is due to the fact that at the time of its design and construction, the route was located entirely within the Kingdom of Sardinia.
- Genova–Casella railway is a railway in Liguria that connects the city of Genoa to Casella, a village in the mountains inland from the city. It operates nine trains per day and it is used for both commuting and tourist purposes. It crosses three valleys.

=== Ports ===
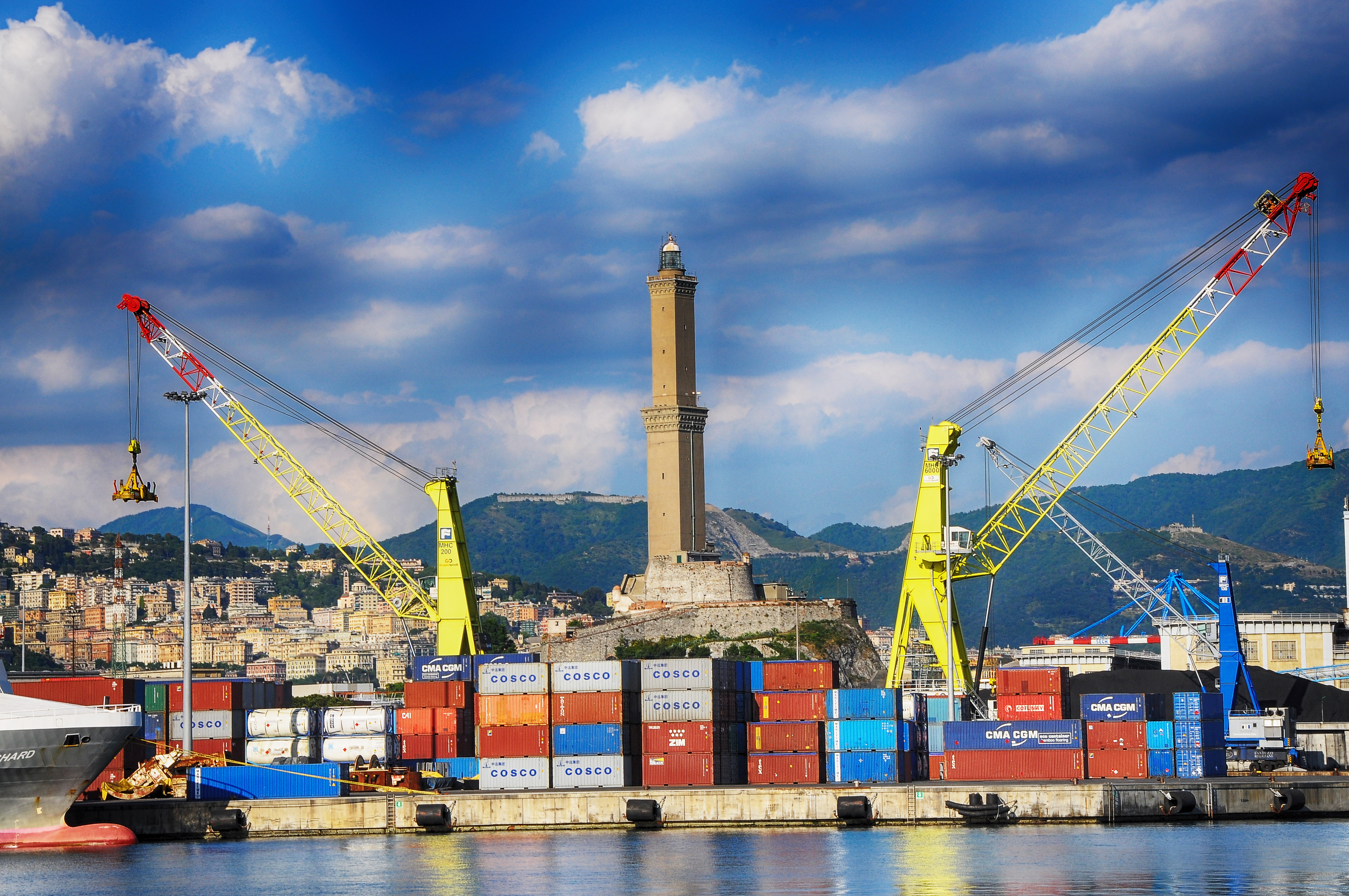
The Lighthouse of Genoa, known as La Lanterna, is the main lighthouse serving the Port of Genoa. Rebuilt in its current shape in 1543 replacing the former lighthouse, it is the world's fourth oldest lighthouse, following the Tower of Hercules in A Coruña, Spain, Hook Head Lighthouse in Ireland, Kõpu Lighthouse, on the island of Hiiumaa, Estonia.

- Port of Genoa is one of the most important seaports in Italy. With a trade volume of 51.6 million tonnes, it is the busiest port of Italy after the port of Trieste by cargo tonnage. There are two major lighthouses: the historical Lanterna, 76 metres (249 feet) tall, and the small lighthouse of Punta Vagno, at the eastern entrance of the port.
- Port of Savona is a port in Savona. It is the fourth cruise port by number of passengers in Italy, with 1,300,000 people in 2013. Adjacent to the historic centre of Savona, the port of Savona has been active from the Middle Ages and has always been crucial for the economy of the regional capital and its hinterland. A major terminal for ferries, there are ferry links to Corsica and Sardinia.
- Port of La Spezia is a port in La Spezia. The port of La Spezia is one of the largest commercial ports in the Ligurian Sea, and is located in the northernmost part of the Gulf of La Spezia. Its development dates from the late nineteenth century and has since grown to become one of the main ports of the Mediterranean Sea, specializing in container handling in particular.

=== Airports ===
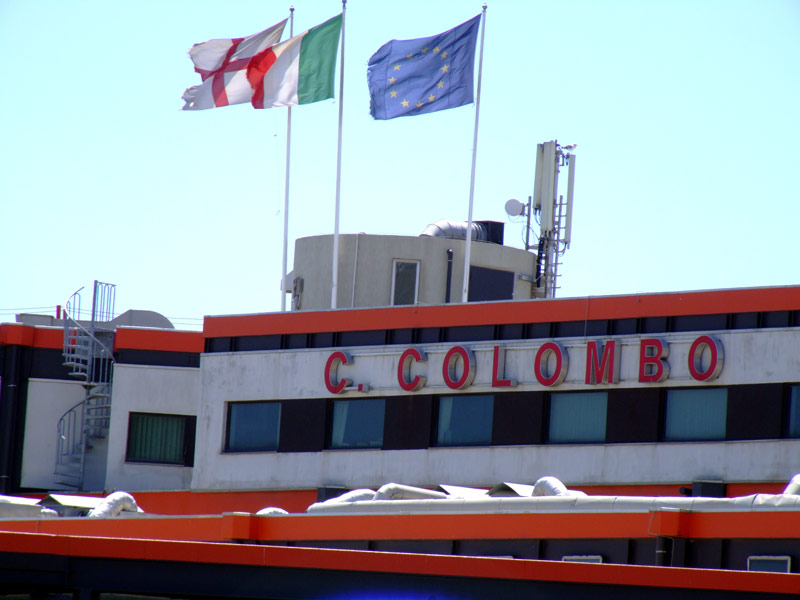
Genoa Cristoforo Colombo Airport

- Genoa Cristoforo Colombo Airport—commonly Genoa-Sestri Ponente Airport, after the city district where it is located—is an international airport built on an artificial peninsula, 4 NM (7.4 km; 4.6 mi) west of Genoa, Italy. The airport began construction in 1954 and opened in 1962, at a cost of 12.8 billion lira. Building an offshore airport was not a strange or unique solution only for Genoa. Among the most conspicuous examples are other airports in Nice, Venice, Gibraltar, or Hong Kong. The current terminal building was opened in 1986. It is the most important airport in Liguria and it serves the city and Port of Genoa, as well as a considerable population in Southern Piedmont (Asti and Alessandria Provinces, southern areas of Cuneo Province).
- Riviera Airport, former known as Villanova d'Albenga Airport, is on the Italian Riviera between Savona and Imperia, approximately 7 kilometres (4.3 mi) west of the town of Albenga, in the community of Villanova d’Albenga. Riviera Airport is mainly used for general aviation in the Northern Mediterranean, with international travel and transport facilitated by the presence of Italian Customs. The airport is also used by the Italian aeroplane manufacturer Piaggio Aerospace. Riviera Airport is well connected to all financial and tourist centres on the Italian and French Riviera by means of highway A10 and the Via Aurelia (SS1). While Monte-Carlo is less than an hour's travel by car, a helicopter company based at the airport can connect passengers from the runway directly to the Principality of Monaco in less than 20 minutes. The airport opened in 1922.

== See also ==
- Italian Riviera
