= Archaeological Museum of Savona =

Museum in Savona, Italy

Civic Museum of Archaeology and the City Museo storico archeologico di Savona
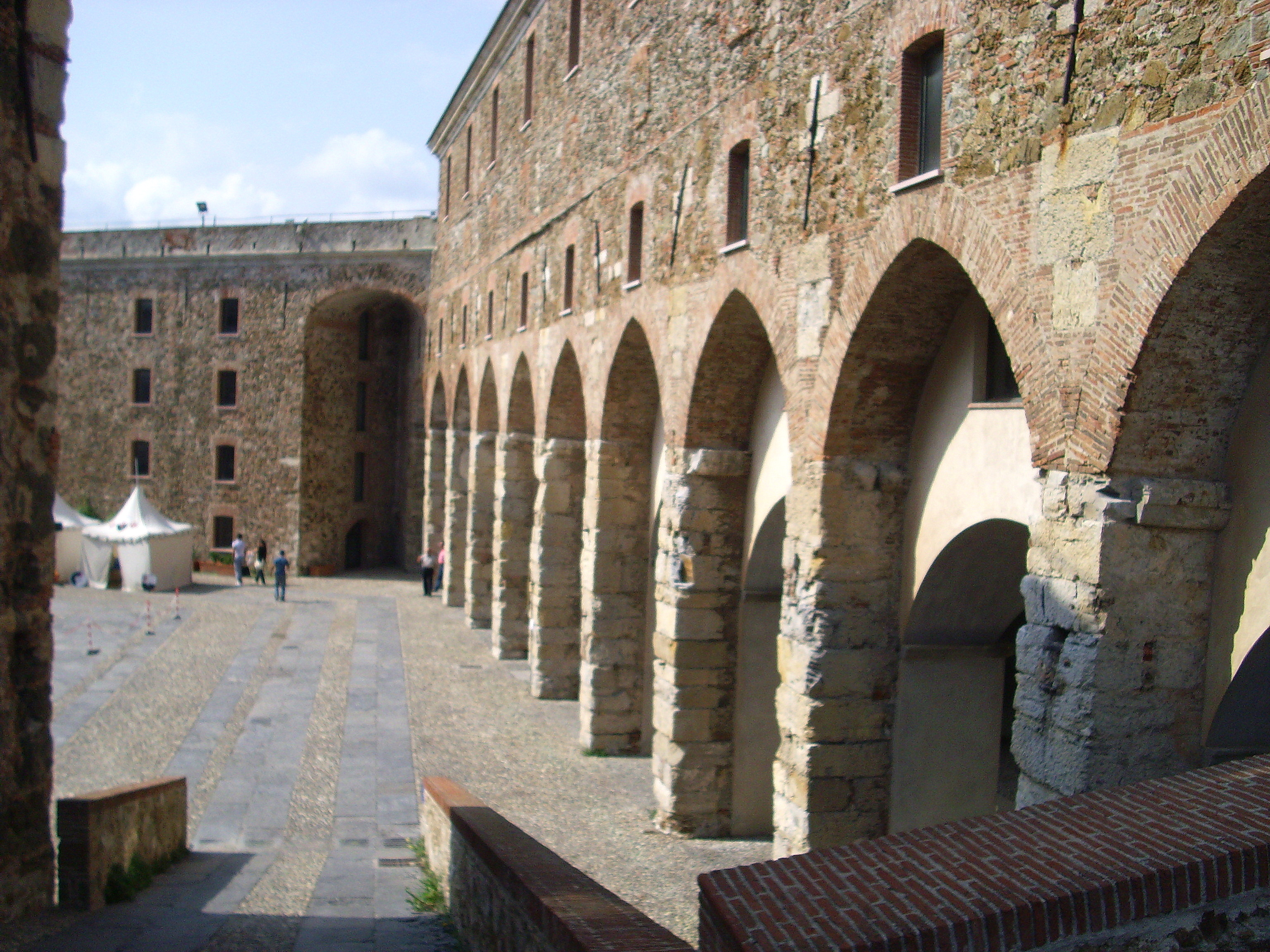
- Palazzo della Loggia, the seat of the museum
- Established: 1990
- Location: Priamar Fortress, Corso Mazzini 1, 17100 Savona, Italy
- Type: archaeology history
- Director: Rita Lavagna
- Website: Official website

44°18′18.14″N 8°29′05.48″E

The Archaeological Museum of Savona (Museo storico archeologico di Savona) is located in Palazzo della Loggia inside the Priamar Fortress. It presents the history of the Priamar promontory and the town of Savona. On the exposition are old collections of objects from around the Mediterranean and artifacts from the 20th century excavations of the fortress and its surrounding (especially ceramic products of the region). The museum has two floors and inside it is possible to see original excavation pits.

== History of the museum ==
The museum was opened on 7 April 1990. Before, the archaeological collection of Savona did not have a permanent seat, being stored in different places and mostly not exposed. The current seat of the museum came to be thanks to numerous seasons of archaeological excavations carried in the Priamar Fortress under the International Institute of Ligurian Studies (Instituto Internazionale di Studi Liguri) directed first by Nino Lamboglia, later by Carlo Varaldo and Rita Lavagna (current director of the museum). The idea of creating a permanent museum in Palazzo della Loggia was born after the temporary exhibition organized in 1979 presenting the results of so far executed excavations.

== The exposition ==
The museum is located on the ground floor and the first floor of Palazzo della Loggia. On the ground floor it is possible to see objects from old collections, such as mosaic, marble reliefs, glass and ceramics from the Bronze Age and Classical periods. Also on the ground floor located is so called 'archaeological area' where exposed are parts of the original excavations, among them that of the Byzantine necropolis. The visit continues on the first floor where illustrated is the history of the town. Exhibited are numerous examples of imported pottery that testify the intense maritime trade with other cities of the Mediterranean. Also exhibited are local ceramic products of Savona as the town was an important centre of production. The last section of the tour concerns urban development and the town's life before and after the construction of the Genoese fortress.

== Gallery ==
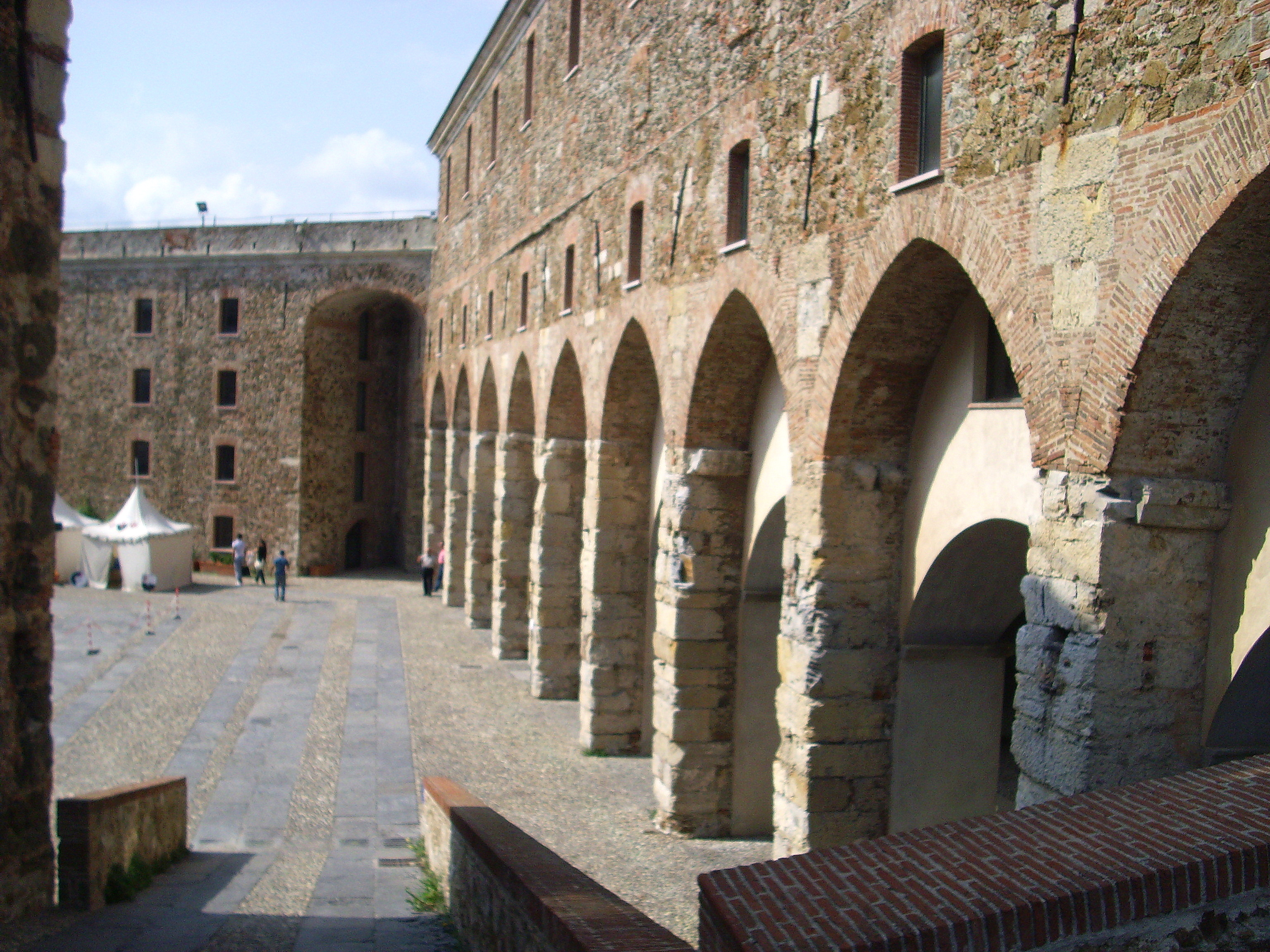
View on Palazzo della Loggia

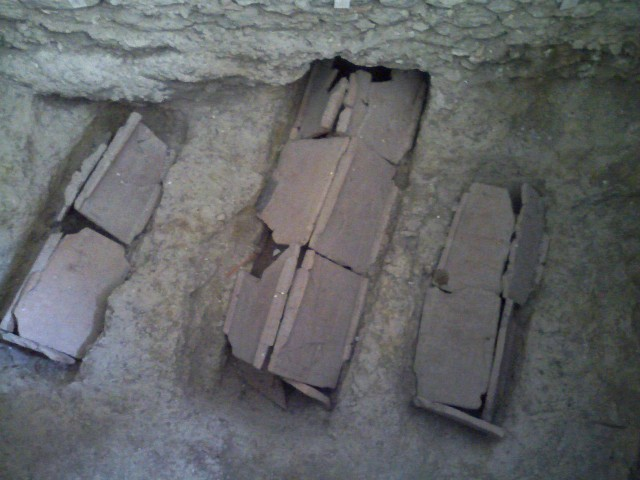
Part of the archaeological excavations showing tombs from 6th and 7th century
