= Wine Grapes =

2012 reference book

- First edition
- Author: Jancis Robinson; Julia Harding; José Vouillamoz
- Language: English
- Genre: Wine grape reference book
- Publisher: Allen Lane
- Publication date: October 2012
- Publication place: United Kingdom
- Media type: Print (hardcover)
- Pages: 1279
- ISBN: 978-1-846-14446-2

Wine Grapes: A Complete Guide to 1,368 Vine Varieties, Including Their Origins and Flavours is a 2012 reference book about varieties of wine grapes. The book covers all grape varieties that were known to produce commercial quantities of wine at the time of writing, which meant 1,368 of the known 10,000 varieties. It is written by British Masters of Wine Jancis Robinson and Julia Harding in collaboration with Swiss grape geneticist José Vouillamoz. The book spans approximately 1,280 pages and won several awards, including the André Simon Award and the Oxford Food Symposium's OFM Best Drinks Book.

== Description ==
Wine Grapes is not an update of Robinson's earlier book Vines, Grapes & Wines, first published in 1986. Wine Grapes is a brand new and original work that is much more extensive in coverage, and also incorporates recent findings from ampelographic research, including DNA profiling of grape varieties.

Wine Grapes include a catalog listing of 1,368 grape varieties from across the globe including 377 Italian, 204 French and 77 Portuguese wine grape varieties. Coverage includes a listing of synonyms as well as the genetic relationship between varieties derived from DNA analysis.

=== DNA findings ===
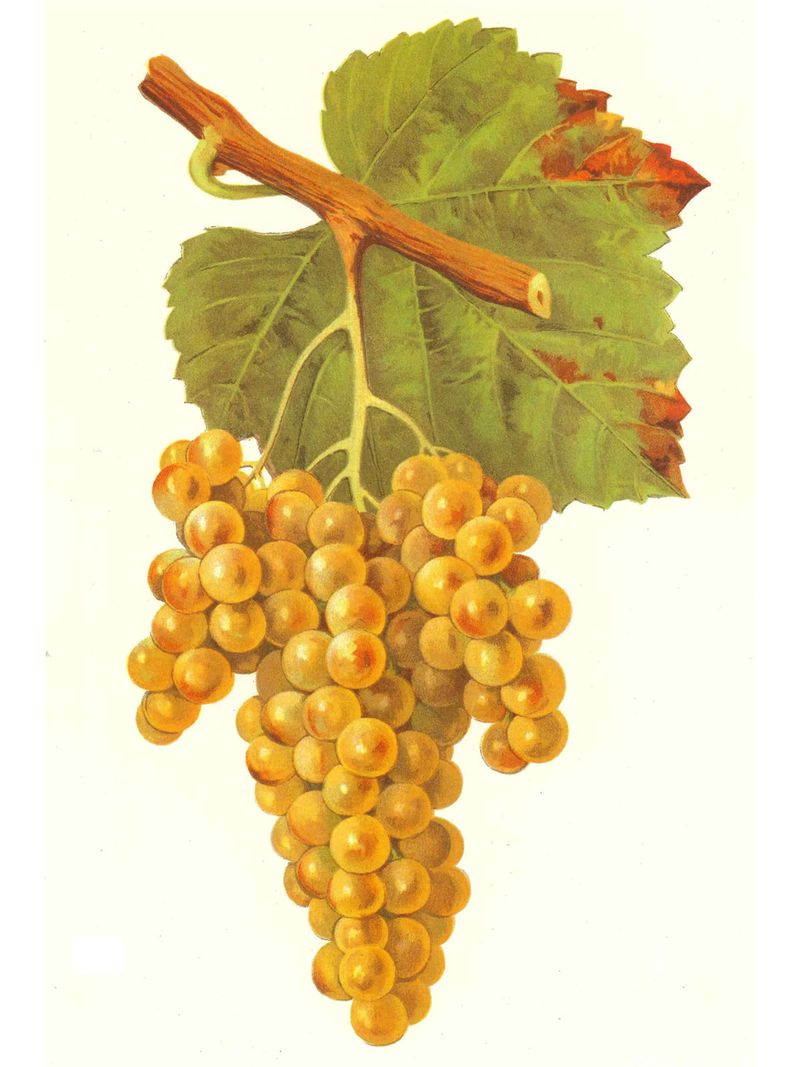
Sample of one of the colour plates from Viala et Vermorel that are included in the book Wine Grapes, that details the extensive family tree of the Pinot grape including the lineage of Petit Manseng (pictured) to Savagnin blanc and Pinot noir

According to Jancis Robinson and José Vouillamoz, Wine Grapes includes details about almost 300 previously unpublished relationship between different grape varieties including the extensive family tree of the Pinot grape that includes a genetic link between the Burgundian wine grape Pinot noir to the Rhône grape Syrah and the Bordeaux varieties Cabernet Sauvignon, Cabernet franc, Merlot and Malbec. The book also details how the Jura wine grape Savagnin blanc descended from the Pinot grape to go on and be the parent vine of several white wine varieties including Chenin blanc, Grüner Veltliner, Sauvignon blanc, Petit Manseng and Verdelho.

Along with research assistant and Master of wine Julia Harding, Robinson and Vouillamoz go on to detail the long history of discovering the parentage of the American wine variety Zinfandel including past research that pointed to a connection between the Italian variety Primitivo and the Croatian wine grape Crljenak Kaštelanski. After years of research and DNA testing of vines from vineyards across the globe, a single 90-year-old grape vine from the garden of an elderly lady in Split, Croatia, provided the evidence to show that Zinfandel was originally a Croatian grape known as Tribidrag that had been cultivated in Croatia since the 15th century.

Other findings reported in Wine Grapes include the discovery of several species of Malvasia grapes growing in central and southern Italy are actually the Spanish wine grape Tempranillo and that Cabernet franc may have originated in Basque country of Spain. Additionally the origins of the assumed to be French varieties of Mourvèdre, Grenache and Carignan are shown to likely be Spanish instead.

Another detail revealed by DNA testing and reported in Wine Grapes is that several northern Italian white wine grape varieties including Favorita, Pigato and Vermentino are genetically the same grape vine which is known under the synonym of Rolle in France but has no genetic relationship to the Rollo grape of Liguria.

== Colour plates ==
A number of grape varieties are illustrated by reproductions of colour plates from Ampélographie. Traité général de viticulture written by Pierre Viala and Victor Vermorel and published in 1901–1910.
