= Vernazza railway station =

Railway station in Vernazza, Italy

Vernazza
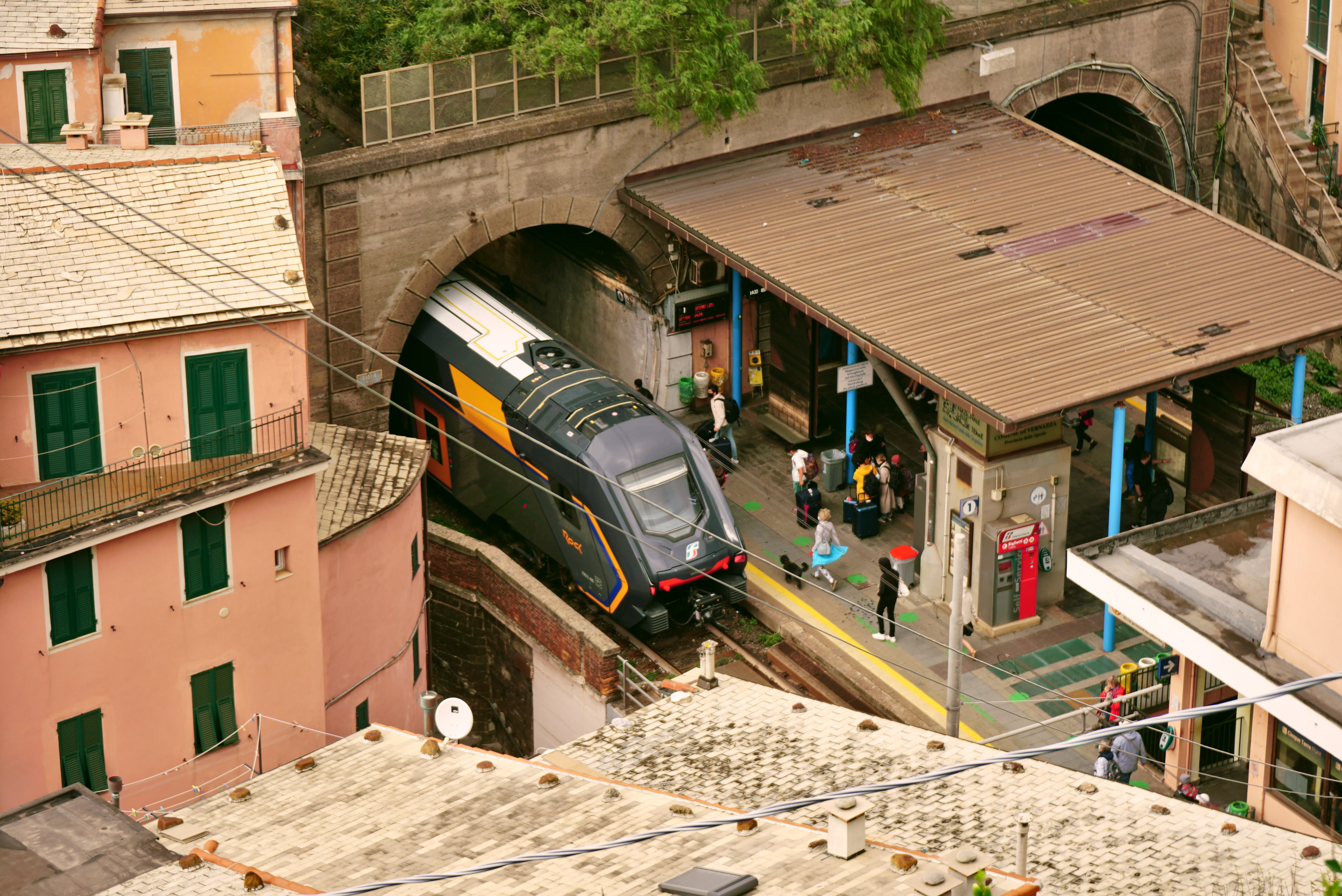

General information
- Location: Via Roma 80; Vernazza, La Spezia, Liguria
- Coordinates: 44°08′06″N 9°41′05″E
- Operator: Rete Ferroviaria Italiana
- Line: Pisa–Genoa
- Platforms: 2
- Tracks: 2
- Train operators: Trenitalia

Construction
- Structure type: In-tunnel and on a viaduct

Other information
- Classification: Silver

History
- Opened: 24 October 1874; 151 years ago
- Electrified: April 1926; 100 years ago; April 1947; 79 years ago
Location
- Location within Liguria Location within Northern Italy Location within Italy

Vernazza railway station (Stazione di Vernazza) is located on the Genoa–Pisa railway, Italy. It serves Vernazza, which is one of the five towns of the Cinque Terre.

== History ==
The station was inaugurated on 24 October 1874, at the same time as the Sestri Levante–La Spezia line. Freight operations commenced on 15 September 1913 with the opening of a short siding on the mountain side.

A double-track line was opened between Monterosso and Corniglia on 15 January 1962, including a new station at Vernazza, which was located to the east of the old station between the Riolo and Vernazza tunnels. Due to the lack of available space, the new infrastructure was built partly in the open air on the site of the goods siding on the mountain side of the line and partly in enlarged sections of both the pre-existing Riolo tunnel and the new Monterosso–Ruvano tunnel. The new arrangement made it possible to build a passenger building and a small freight yard, which was of great importance given the lack of road links that characterise the town.

In June and July 2011, the station was also served by the Treni del Mare ("trains of the sea") managed by the private company Arenaways, which became bankrupt shortly afterwards. A devastating flood buried part of the town of Vernazza on 25 October 2011. The presence of the station, once freed from mud and debris, contributed significantly to the logistics of the rescue teams which were able to begin the long work of restoring the town from it.

== Buildings and infrastructure ==
The two tracks of Vernazza station are largely in the tunnel, due to the shortness of the open section on which the passenger building is located. This makes the station look like a metro station.

== Services ==
The station, which RFI manages and classified in 2008 in the silver category, has:

- ticket office
- ticket machines
- waiting room
- bar
- toilets

== Rail services ==
The station is served by Trenitalia regional services operated under a contract with the region of Liguria.
