= Bianchetta =

Bianchetta is part of the primary name or synonym of several Italian wine grape varieties including:

- Bianchetta Trevigiana, grape most commonly known as Bianchetta
- Bianchetta bianca, also known as Albarola
- Bianchetta Casaco
- Bianchetta Castelli Monfumo
- Bianchetta di Bacedasco
- Bianchetta di Diolo
- Bianchetta Genovese, also known as Scimiscià
- Arneis, also known as Bianchetta d'Alba
- Maceratino, also known as Bianchetta Montecchiese
