= Corniglia railway station =

Railway station in Liguria, Italy

Corniglia
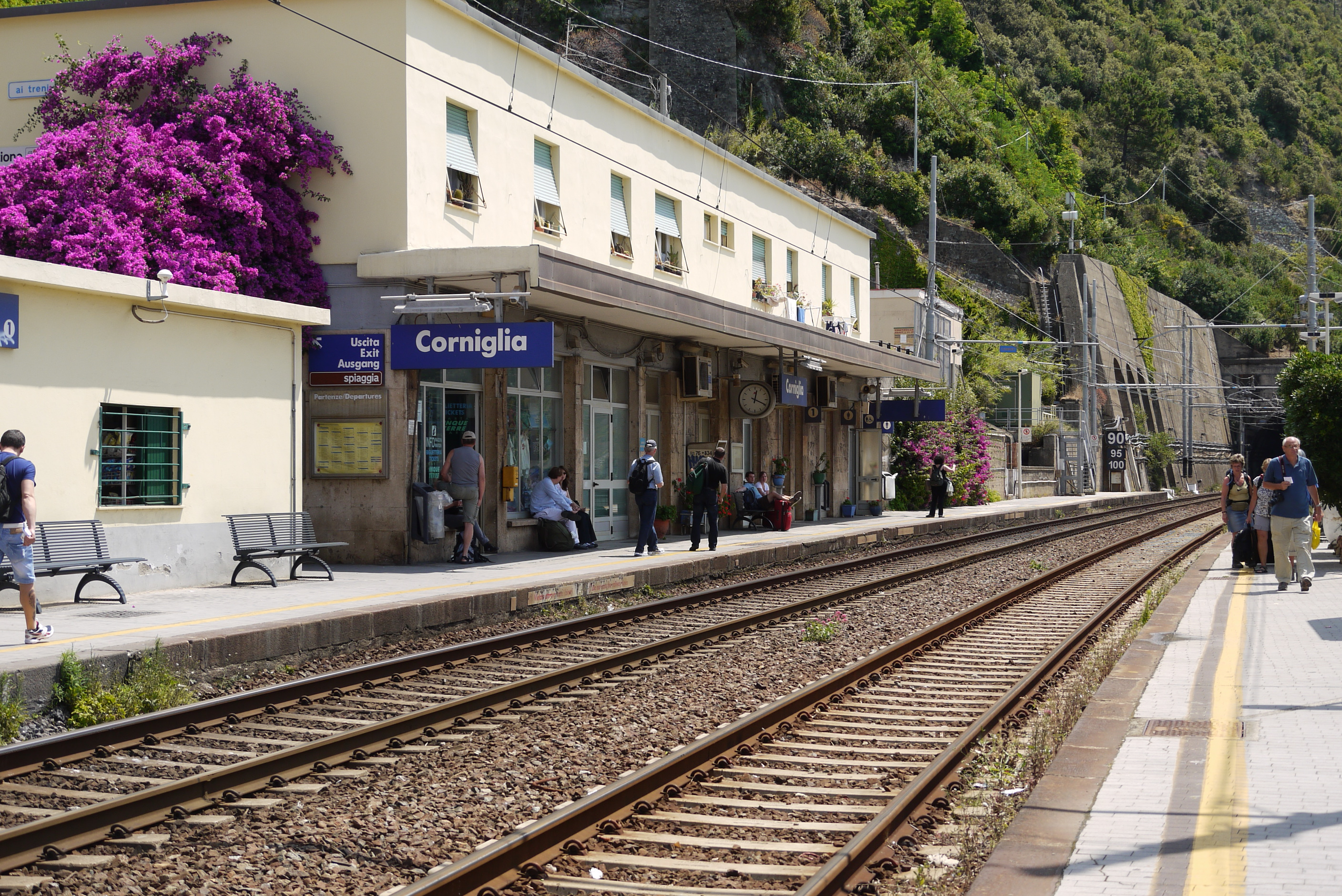

General information
- Location: Via alla Stazione 20; Corniglia, Vernazza, La Spezia, Liguria
- Coordinates: 44°07′07″N 9°42′59″E
- Operator: Rete Ferroviaria Italiana
- Line: Pisa–Genoa
- Platforms: 3
- Train operators: Trenitalia

Other information
- Classification: Silver

History
- Opened: 24 October 1874; 151 years ago
- Electrified: April 1926; 100 years ago; April 1947; 79 years ago
Location
- Location within Liguria Location within Northern Italy Location within Italy

Corniglia railway station (Stazione di Corniglia) is located on the Genoa–Pisa railway, Italy. It serves Corniglia, which is one of the five towns of the Cinque Terre.

== History ==
The station was inaugurated on 24 October 1874, at the same time as the Sestri Levante–La Spezia line. The station building was built in 1931.

As part of the doubling and upgrading of the line, the station was completely rebuilt. Since then, the distance between the sets of points at each end of the station is 800 m and the useful length for train crossings is 567 m. The rail level was raised by seven metres to avoid massive excavations and work was carried out to channel water flows affecting the line. The new station building was completed in 1959. A building was also built at the entrance to the Guvano tunnel to accommodate staff.

The double-track line was opened between Monterosso and Corniglia on 15 January 1962, including a new station at Vernazza.

In June and July 2011, the station was also served by the Treni del Mare ("trains of the sea") managed by the private company Arenaways, which became bankrupt shortly afterwards.

== Buildings and infrastructure ==
The station has three platforms; platform 1 is used mainly by trains to La Spezia, platform 3 by trains to Genoa, while platform 2, is used by trains being overtaken.

== Services ==
The station, which RFI manages and classified in 2008 in the silver category, has:

- toilets
- bar.

== Rail services ==
The station is served by Trenitalia regional services operated under a contract with the region of Liguria.
