= Colline di Levanto DOC =

Italian wine with a protected origin

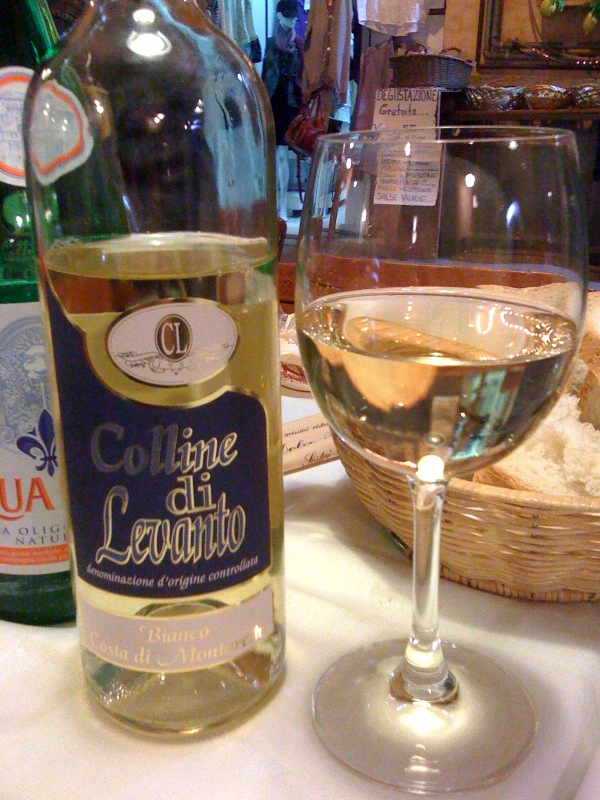
A bottle of Colline di Levanto white wine.

Colline di Levanto is an Italian Denominazione di origine controllata (DOC) located in Liguria that produces both red and white wines primarily from Sangiovese and Vermentino, respectively. Located next to the notable white wine only DOC of Cinque Terre, the Colline di Levanto has very similar vineyard soils and mesoclimate to its neighboring wine region.

== DOC rules ==
Any grapes destined for DOC wine production in Colline di Levanto must be harvested to a yield no greater than 11 tonnes/hectare with the finished wines needing to attain a minimum alcohol level of at least 11%. The red wines of the DOC are composed of at least 40% Sangiovese with Ciliegiolo permitted up to a maximum of 20% and other local red varieties collectively permitted up to 40%. The white wines are composed of 40-75% Vermentino with 20-55% Albarola, 5-40% Bosco and up to 5% of other local white grape varieties.
