= Monterosso railway station =

Railway station in Italy

Monterosso
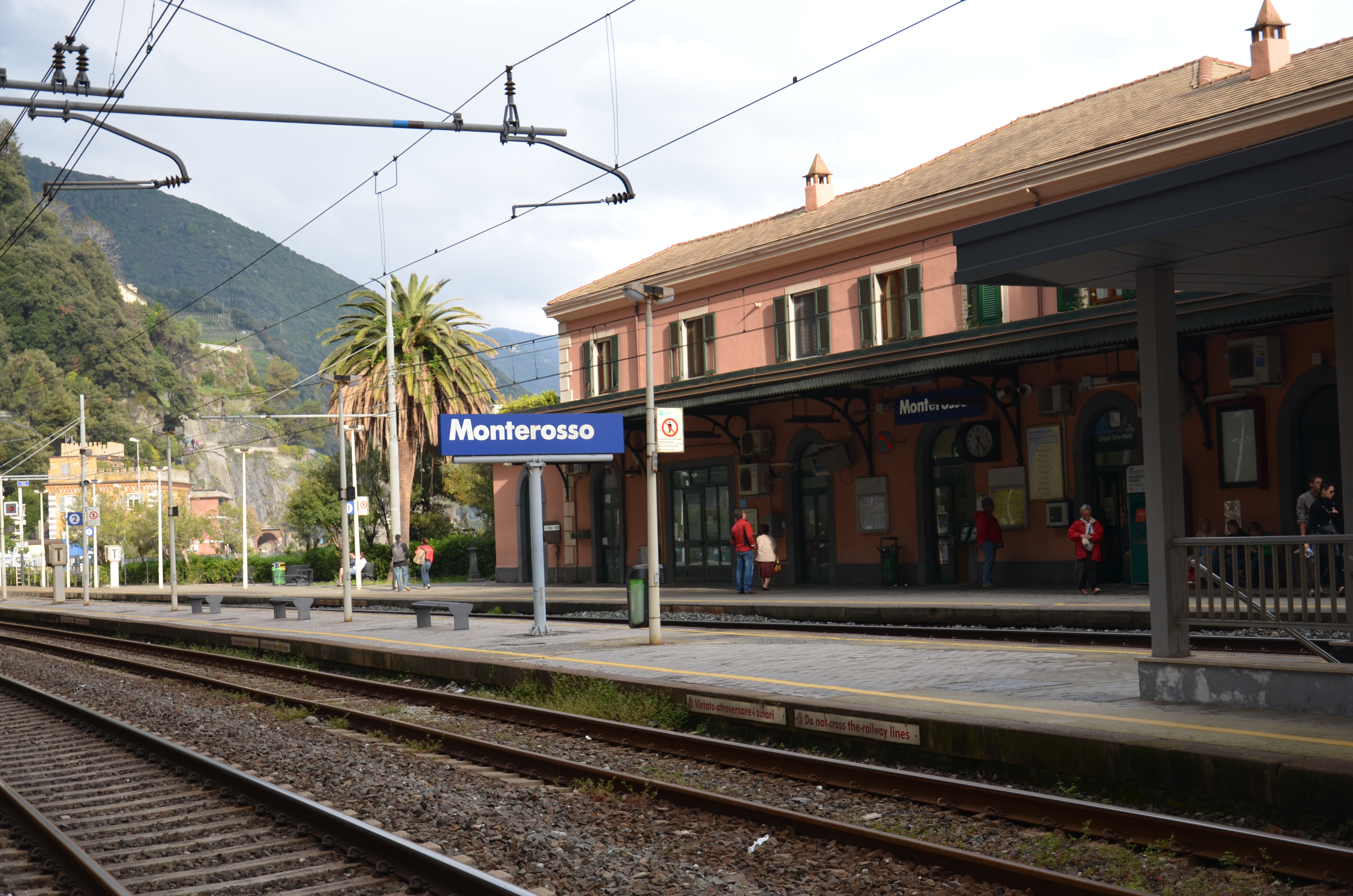

General information
- Location: Via Fegina 40; Monterosso, La Spezia, Liguria
- Coordinates: 44°08′45″N 9°38′56″E
- Operator: Rete Ferroviaria Italiana
- Line: Pisa–Genoa
- Platforms: 3
- Train operators: Trenitalia

Other information
- Classification: Silver

History
- Opened: 24 October 1874; 151 years ago
- Electrified: April 1926; 100 years ago; April 1947; 79 years ago
Location
- Location within Liguria Location within Northern Italy Location within Italy

Monterosso railway station (Stazione di Monterosso) is located on the Genoa–Pisa railway, Italy. It serves Monterosso al Mare, which is one of the five towns of the Cinque Terre.

== History ==
The station was inaugurated on 24 October 1874, at the same time as the Sestri Levante–La Spezia line.

On 11 March 1918, the year in which the station was enlarged, an extension of the crossing loop was activated and, at the same time, a special cabin was installed at the new station to centralise the control of the signals.

A double-track line was opened between Monterosso and Corniglia on 15 January 1962, including a new station at Vernazza. The doubling towards Framura, the last section of the line to remain single track, was not completed until 23 January 1970. It was in fact a particularly complex project, given the need to operate without interrupting operations on the line and the need to manage water flows above the line. The construction of a building to accommodate six staff dates back to this period.

In June and July 2011, the station was also served by the Treni del Mare ("trains of the sea") managed by the private company Arenaways, which became bankrupt shortly afterwards.

== Buildings and infrastructure ==
Inside the station building, which is built on two levels, there are various services such as a ticket office, a bar and a waiting room.

Monterosso has three platforms for passenger services. Due to its particular position close to the mountains, the station is located between three tunnels, which is why the foot paths are partly in the tunnel and partly outside. Platforms 1 and 3 are normally used, while platform 2 is used only to allow overtaking or for the terminus of some special services.

The freight yard is currently closed.

== Services ==
The station, which RFI manages and classified in 2008 in the silver category, has:

- ticket counter
- ticket machines
- bar
- toilets.

== Rail services ==
The station is served by Trenitalia regional services operated under a contract with the region of Liguria.
