= Cinque Terre DOC =

Italian white wine region

Cinque Terre is a small DOC white wine region in Liguria, North Italy. The DOC was granted in 1973 and production is limited to the coastal areas of the Cinque Terre in the Province of La Spezia, and specifically to the territories of the communes of Riomaggiore (including Manarola), Vernazza (which includes the village of Corniglia, whose wine has been known since Roman times) and Monterosso al Mare, together with two adjacent areas within the commune of La Spezia: Tramonti di Biassa and Tramonti di Campiglia.

The wine is produced from a must containing at least 40% of the Bosco grape, but may also contain up to 40% of Albarola and/or Vermentino and up to 20% of other white-berried grapes approved and/or recommended for the Province of La Spezia.

The wines tend to be dry, with straw yellow colour, and a delicate aroma.

== Food matches ==
Typically, it is best drunk with the local cuisine, and especially with seafood — until the arrival of the railway in 1874, the five villages of the Cinque Terre were little fishing hamlets, accessible only by sea.

== Sciacchetrà ==
Sciacchetrà DOC is also produced in the same Cinque Terre area and is a 'vino passito' or Straw wine of the Cinque Terre DOC wine, and is typically drunk with cheese or desserts.
