= Volastra =

Human settlement in Liguria, Italy

Coordinates: 44.1152°N 9.73018°E

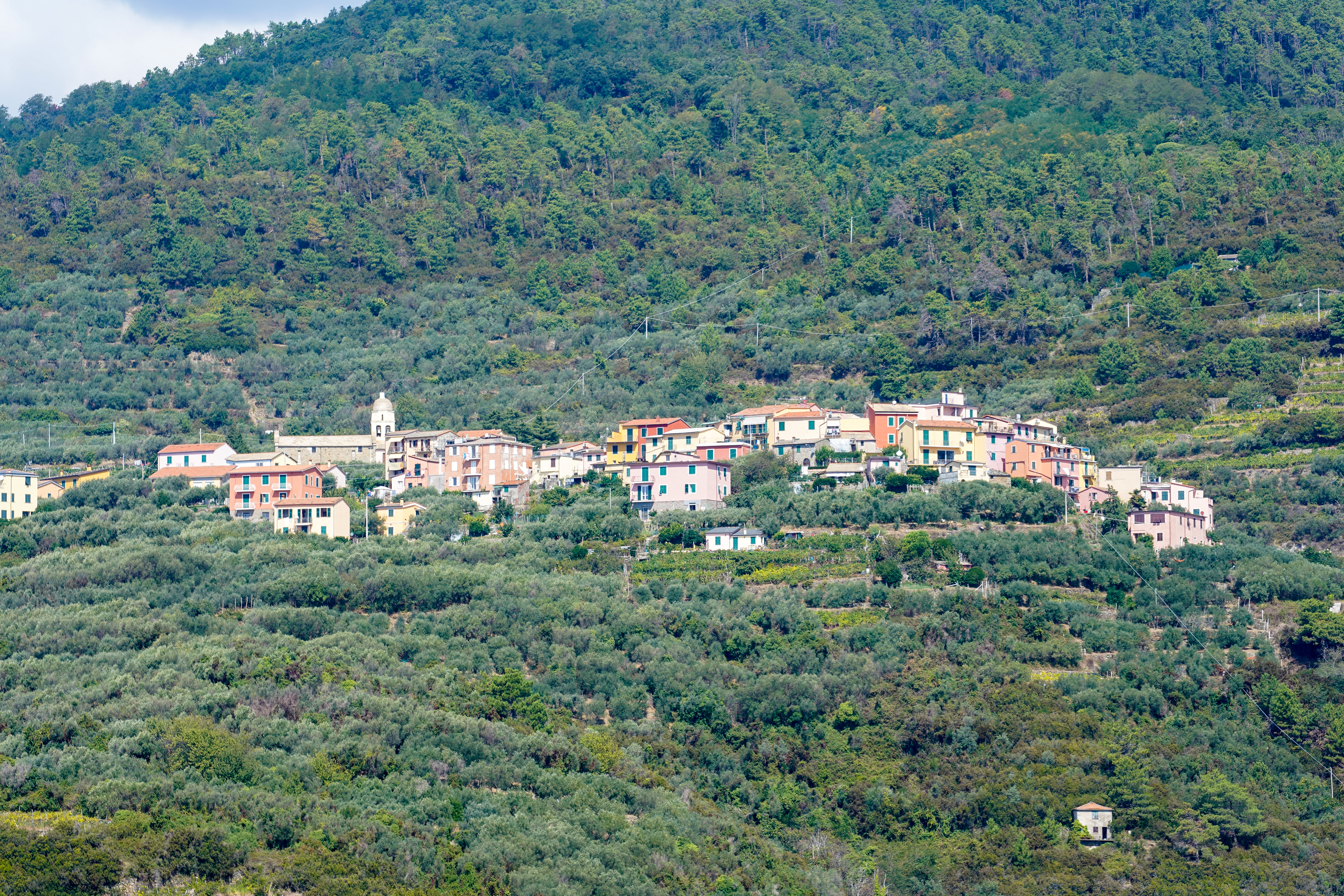
Volastra amidst olive groves

Volastra is one of the oldest villages in the Cinque Terre National Park, Italy. Situated above Manarola, the village is set amidst vineyards and olive groves in terraces with dry stone walls. The population is less than 200 residents. The Nostra Signora della Salute ("Our Lady of Health") is located in Volastra.

== Nostra Signora della Salute ==
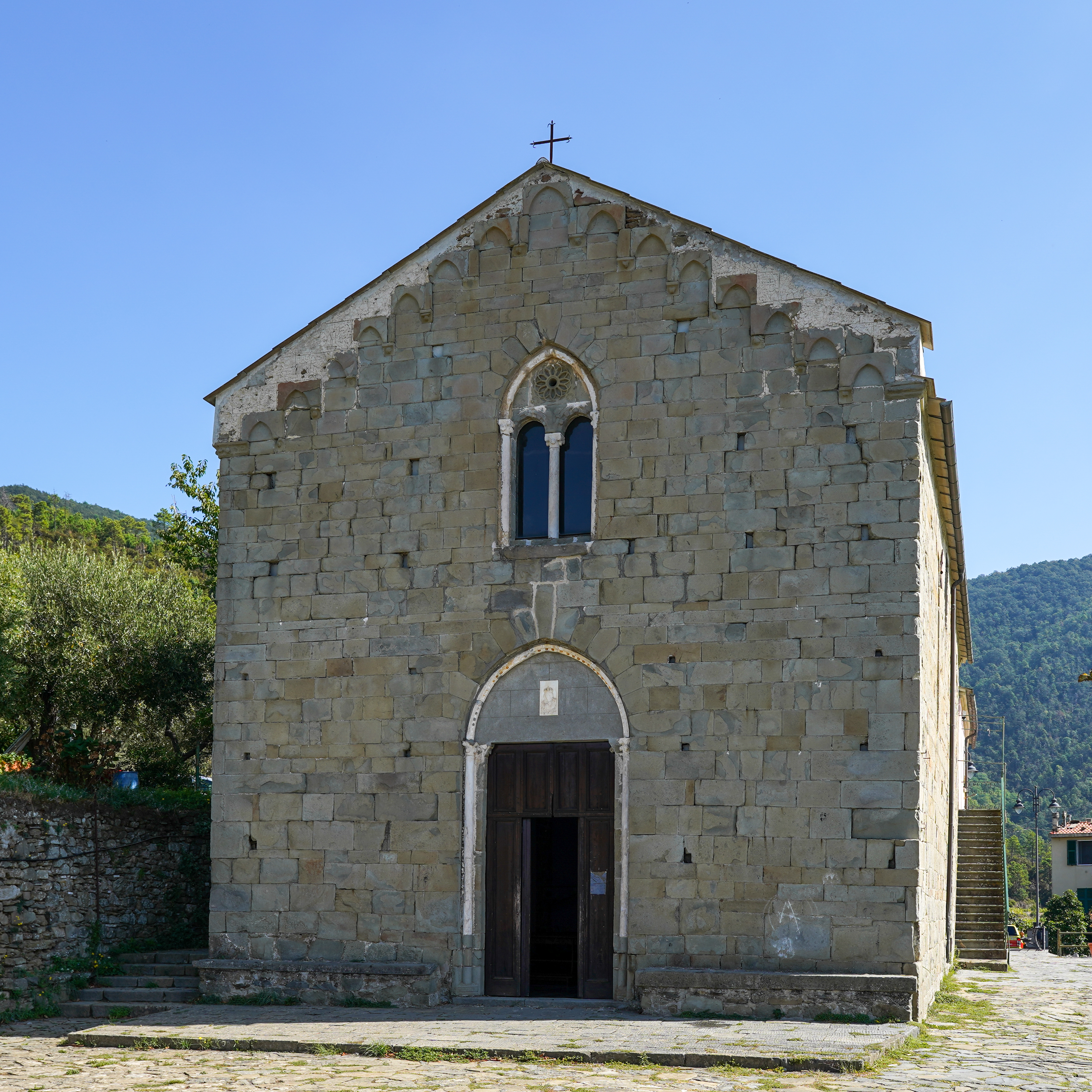
Nostra Signora della Salute church

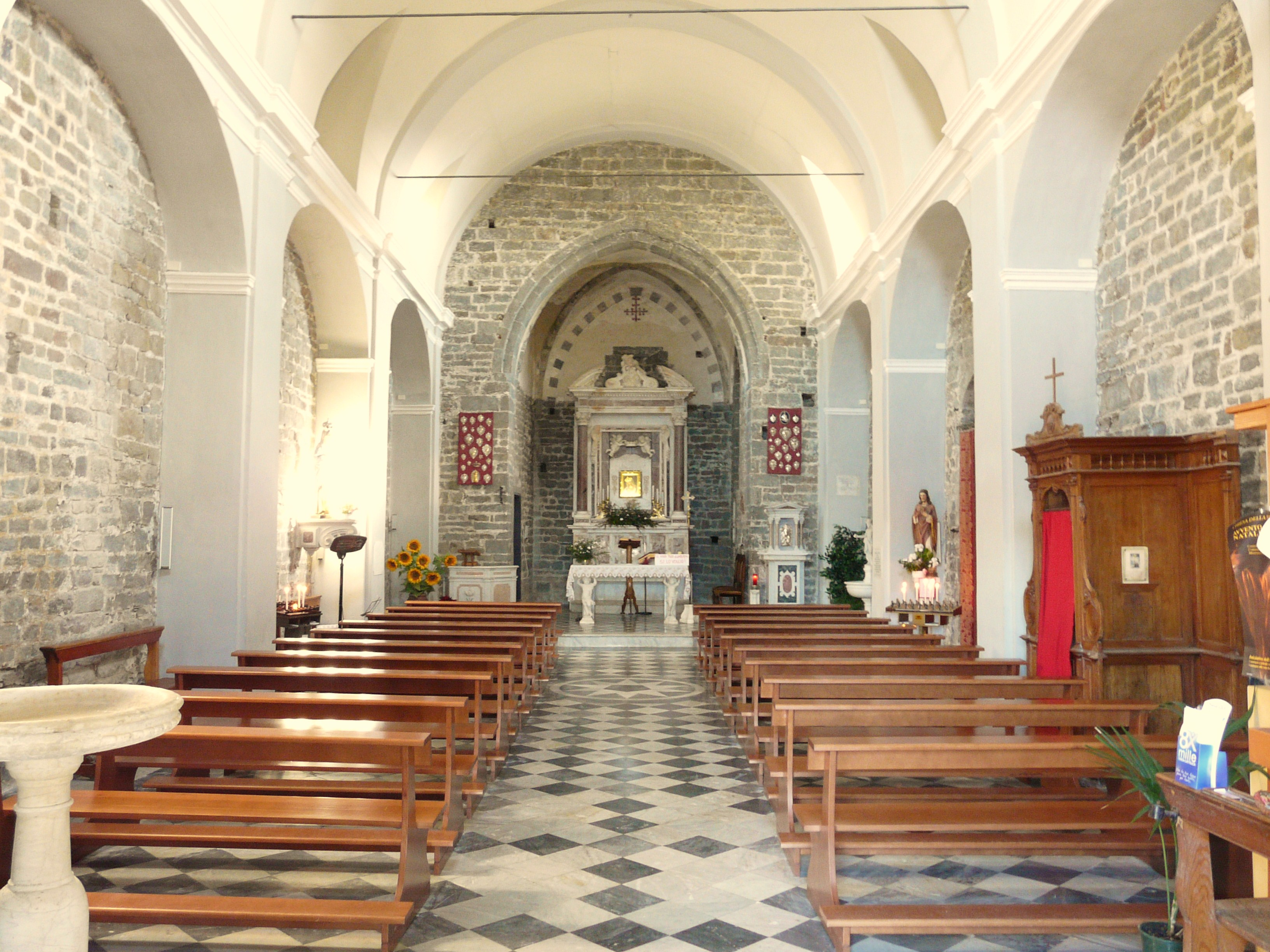
Nave of the church

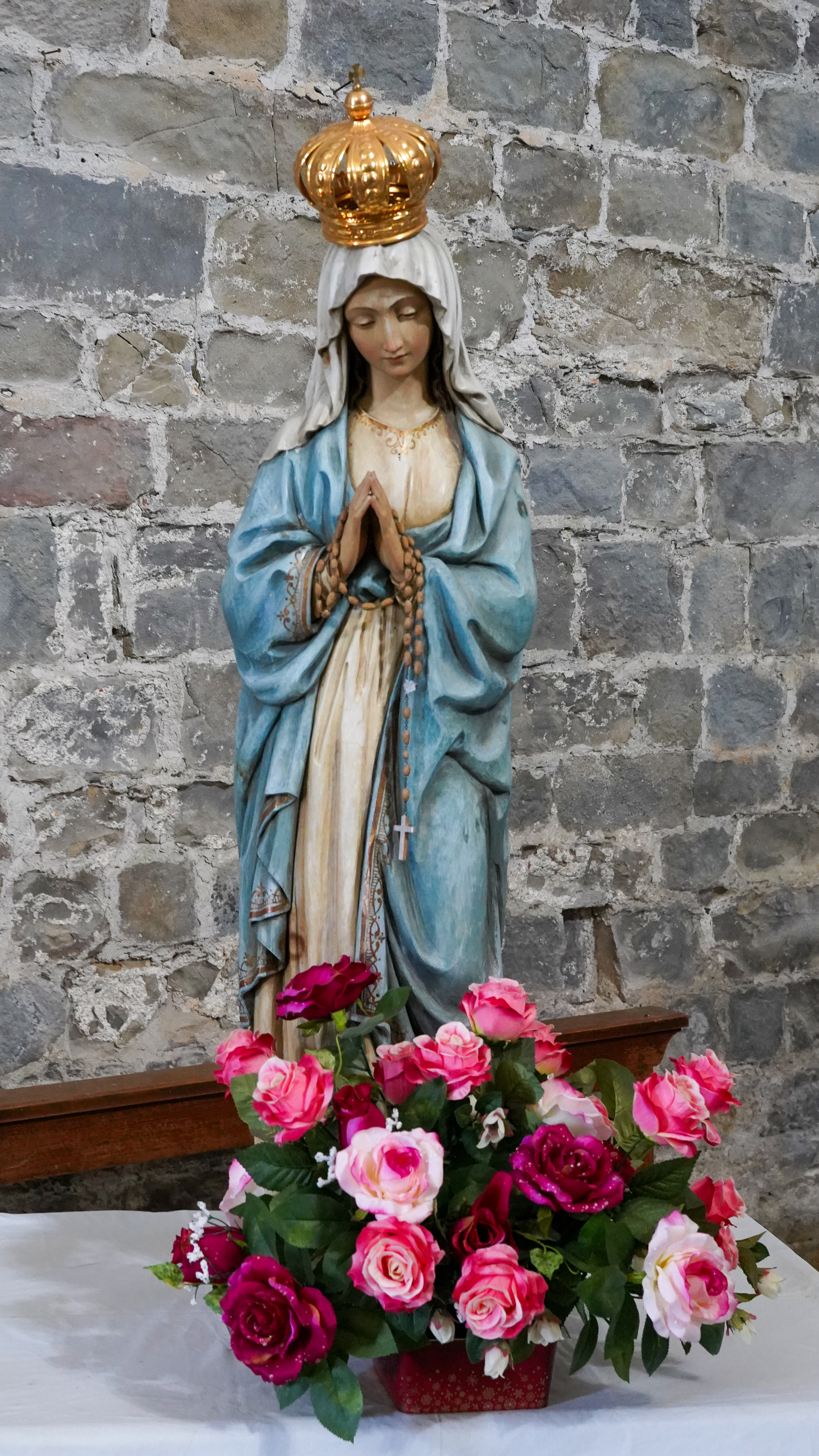
Crowned statue of Virgin Mary

The most notable building in Volastra is Nostra Signora della Salute ("Our Lady of Health"). The church is constructed of sandstone blocks in the Romanesque style, in the 10th or 12th century. The single nave has a statue of Mary that was crowned in 1861.
