= Durella =

Variety of grape

- Grape (Vitis)
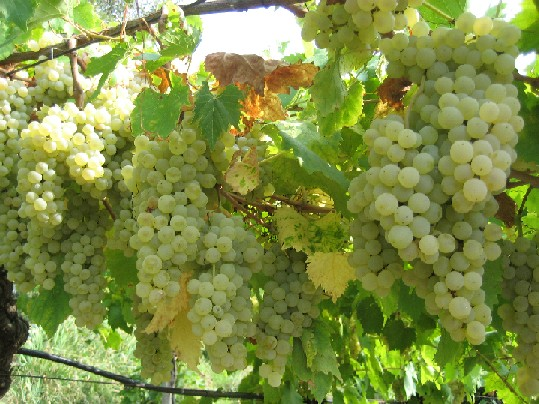
- Color of berry skin: Blanc
- Species: Vitis vinifera
- Also called: Durello and other synonyms
- Origin: Italy
- Notable regions: Veneto
- VIVC number: 3737

Durella or Durello is a white Italian wine grape variety originating from the Veneto wine region of northeast Italy. Today it is sparsely cultivated, though some producers like to experiment with it since its high acid levels makes it suitable for sparkling wines.

The white Veneto wine grape Bianchetta Trevigiana is believed to be the result of a natural crossing between Durella and the nearly extinct red wine grape Brambana.

== Synonyms ==
Durella is also known under the synonyms Cagnina, Duracino, Durella bianca, Durello, Durelo, Durola bianca, Rabbiosa, Rabiosa, Rabiosa di Asolo, and Raboso Piava.
