= Favorita (grape) =

Variety of grape

- Grape (Vitis)
- Color of berry skin: Blanc
- Species: Vitis vinifera
- Origin: Italy
- Notable regions: Piedmont

Favorita is a white Italian wine grape grown primarily in the Piedmont region. It is most widely planted on the left bank of the Tanaro river in the Roero district near Alba, though some plantings exist on the right bank of the Tanaro in the Langhe hills. Recent DNA profiling shows that Favorita is related to the Liguria grapes Pigato and Vermentino, which may support the theory that the grape originated there. Since the late 20th century, plantings of Favorita have been on the decline as Chardonnay and Arneis have increased in popularity among producers on the right and left bank of the Tanaro respectively. Featuring larger berry sizes than most wine grapes, Favorita has been a popular table grape in Piedmont.

== History ==
Favorita has long been closely associated with the Ligurian grape Vermentino, with some early ampelographers theorizing that the two grapes were one and the same. In 1964, the Italian Ministry of Agriculture determined that there were enough differences in the buds, clusters and leaves of the two vines to officially classify them as separate grape varieties. In recent years, DNA profiling has shown Favorita to be related to Vermentino, as well as Pigato, but confirmed it as a distinct variety.

== Wines ==
Favorita wines are noted for their intense pear notes and an ability to age shorter than Arneis. The grapes tend to ripen late and maintain a fair amount of acidity. Historically it has been used as a blending partner with Nebbiolo to soften that grape's harsh tannins. When planted on warm climate sites, the Favorita can develop minerality and notes of sea salt. Exposure to oak barrel aging can give the wine a rounder mouthfeel.
