= Monterosso al Mare =

Monterosso al Mare Munterussu
- Comune
- Comune di Monterosso al Mare
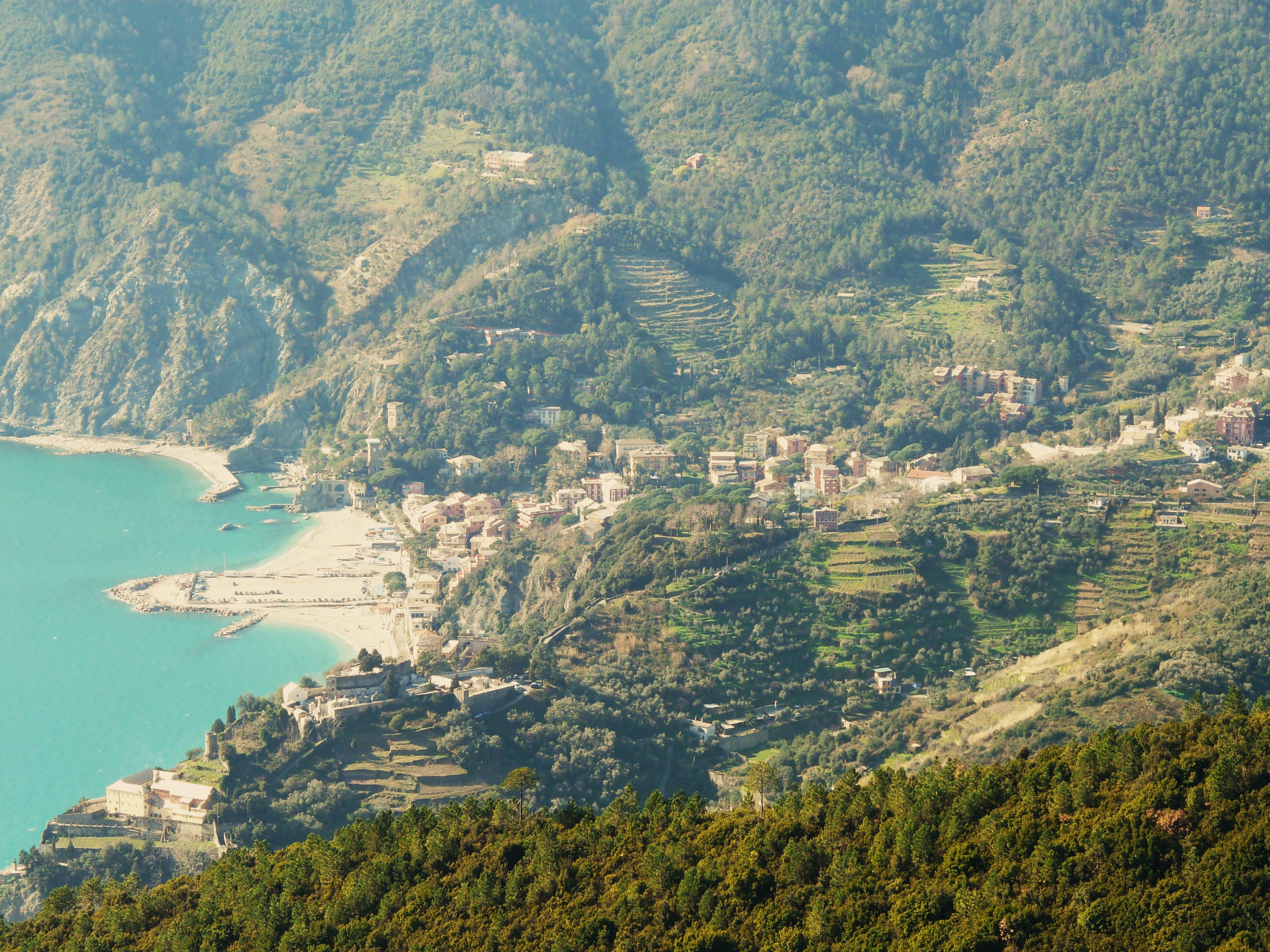
- View of Monterosso al Mare

- Coat of arms

- Location of Monterosso al Mare in Italy Monterosso al Mare (Liguria)
- Coordinates: 44°08′45″N 09°39′15″E
- Country: Italy
- Region: Liguria
- Province: La Spezia (SP)
- Founded: 1861

Government
  - Mayor: Francesco Sassarini (Insieme per Monterosso)

Area
  - Total: 10.94 km^{2} (4.22 sq mi)
- Elevation: 12 m (39 ft)

Population (June 2024)
  - Total: 1,314
  - Density: 120.1/km^{2} (311.1/sq mi)
- Demonym: Monterossini
- Time zone: UTC+1 (CET)
  - Summer (DST): UTC+2 (CEST)
- Postal code: 19016
- Dialing code: 0187
- ISTAT code: 011019
- Patron saint: John the Baptist
- Saint day: 24 June
- Website: www.comune.monterosso.sp.it

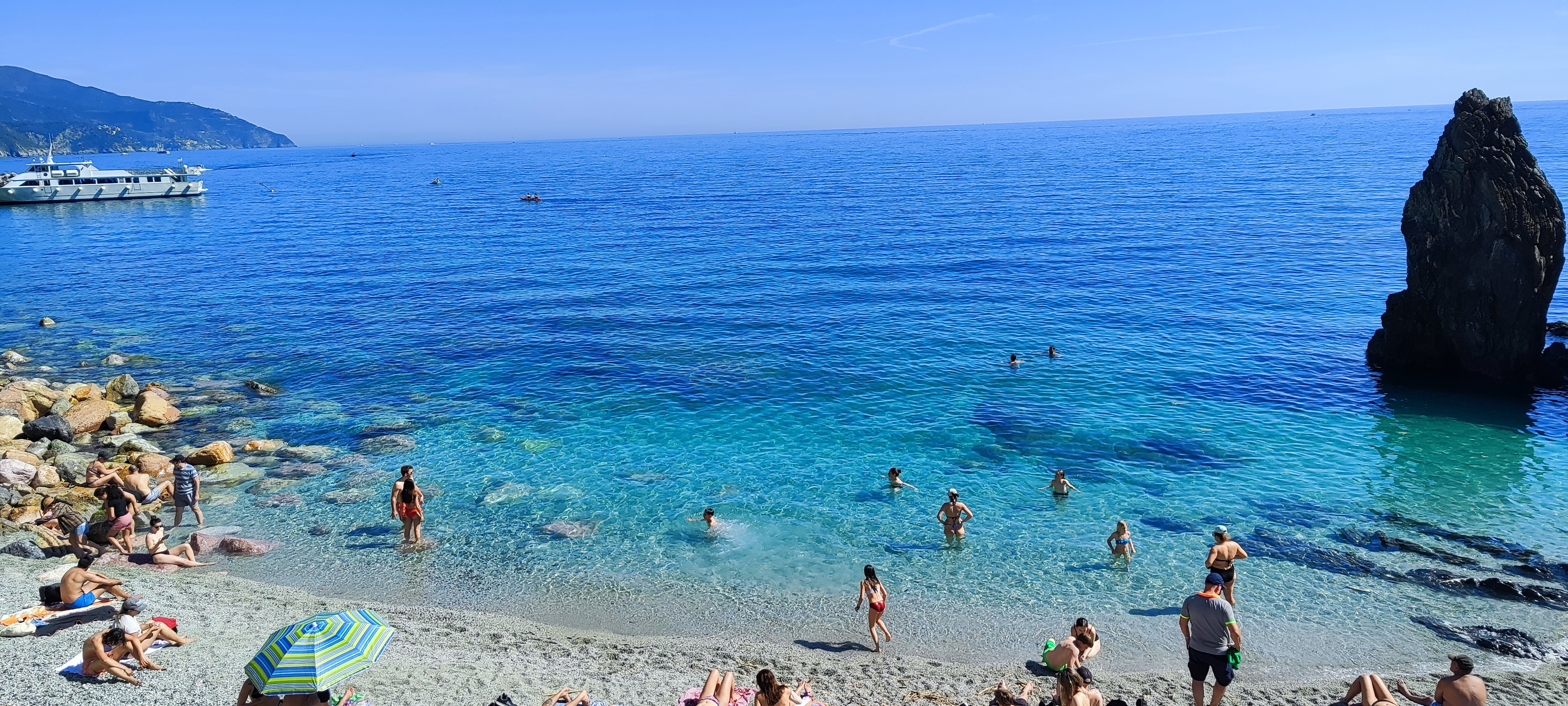

Monterosso al Mare (Ligurian: Munterussu) is a town and comune in the province of La Spezia, part of the region of Liguria, Northern Italy. It is one of the five villages in Cinque Terre.

== Overview ==
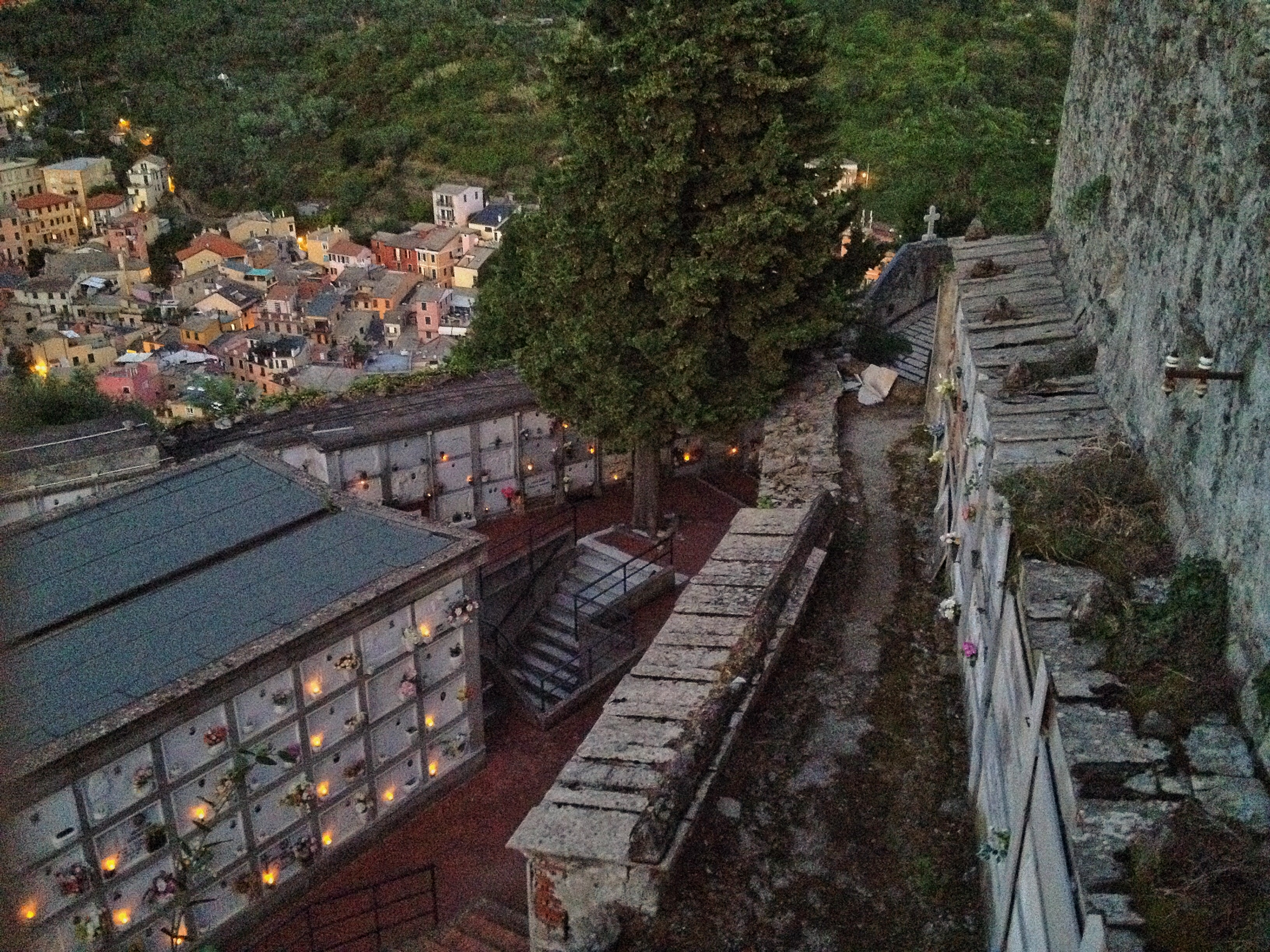
The cemetery within the convent

Twinned to Saint-Genès-Champanelle, France, Monterosso al Mare is located at the center of a small natural gulf, protected by a small artificial reef, to the east of Punta Mesco in the Riviera of La Spezia. It is the westernmost of the Cinque Terre. In the west part of the original village, beyond the hill of the Capuchins, it is the village of Fegina, natural expansion and characterized by a relatively modern tourist resort facility compared to the ancient village that is reachable through a tunnel of a few tens of meters. The local train station is located at Fegina and the beaches are relatively larger compared to the narrow cliffs that characterize the other villages of the Cinque Terre.

The town is divided into two distinct parts: the old town and the new town. The two areas are divided by a single tunnel that caters to pedestrians and the very few cars in the town.

The beach at Monterosso runs along most of the coast line and is well used by tourists and locals. The beach is the only extensive sand beach in the Cinque Terre. Monterosso is a small town overrun by tourists in the summer months.

The village was briefly excluded from the Cinque Terre trail in 1948, but was re-introduced in mid-1949. Italian officials considered the village too large to be considered part of the historic trail.

The area is famous for its many lemon trees that can be seen throughout Monterosso. It is also renowned for its white wines, grapes, and olives.

== History ==
Historically, many of the villages on the Mediterranean were walled to protect against attacks from the sea. This area of the coast was often attacked by pirates.

In 1870, the Italian government built a railroad line into the city, which opened it up to the outside world. It is the main way in which people enter the city.

During World War II, many young men from the Cinque Terre fought for the resistance against the fascist regime of Benito Mussolini, and the subsequent Nazi German occupation of Italy.

== Main sights ==
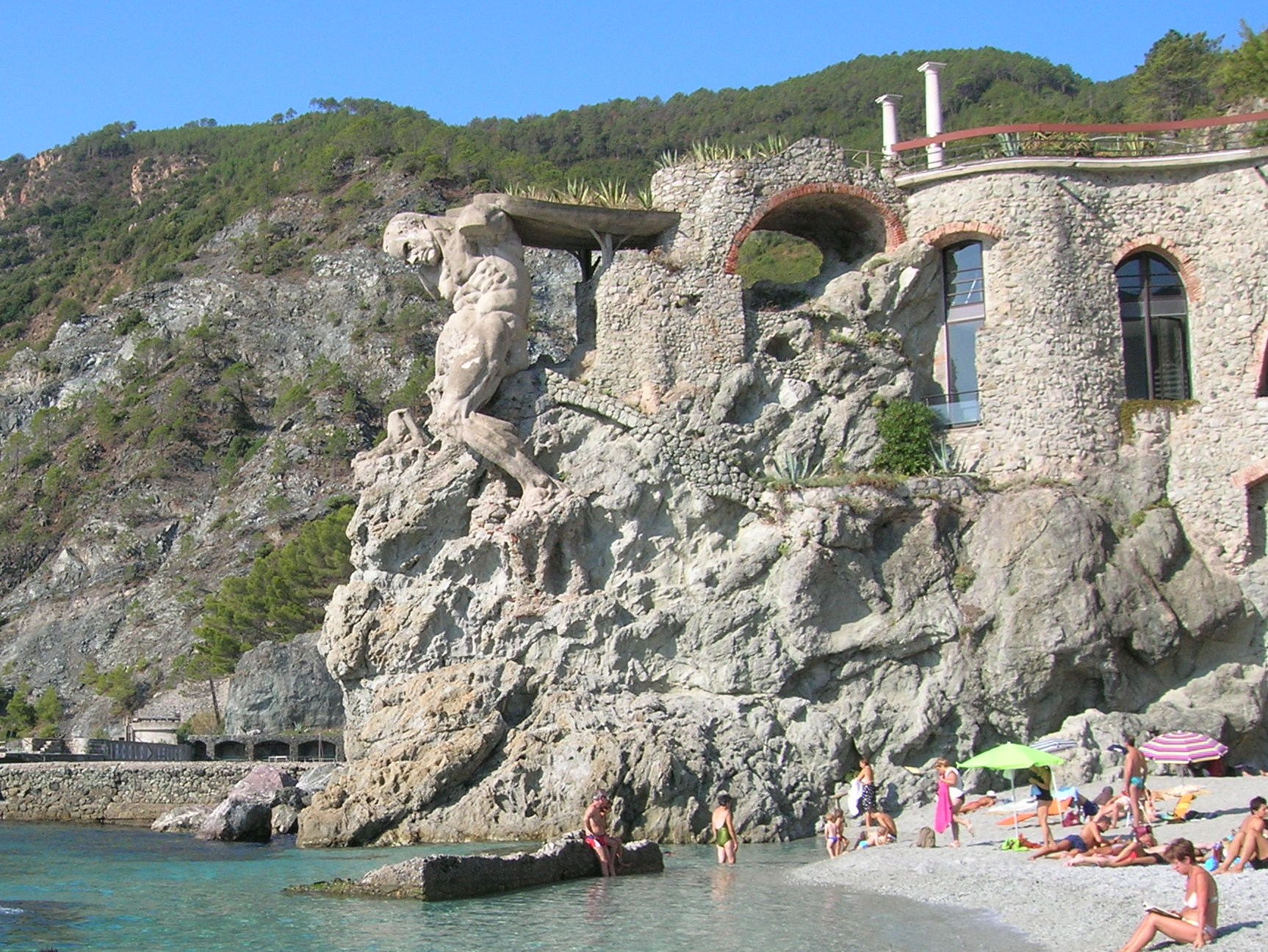
Monterosso Giant

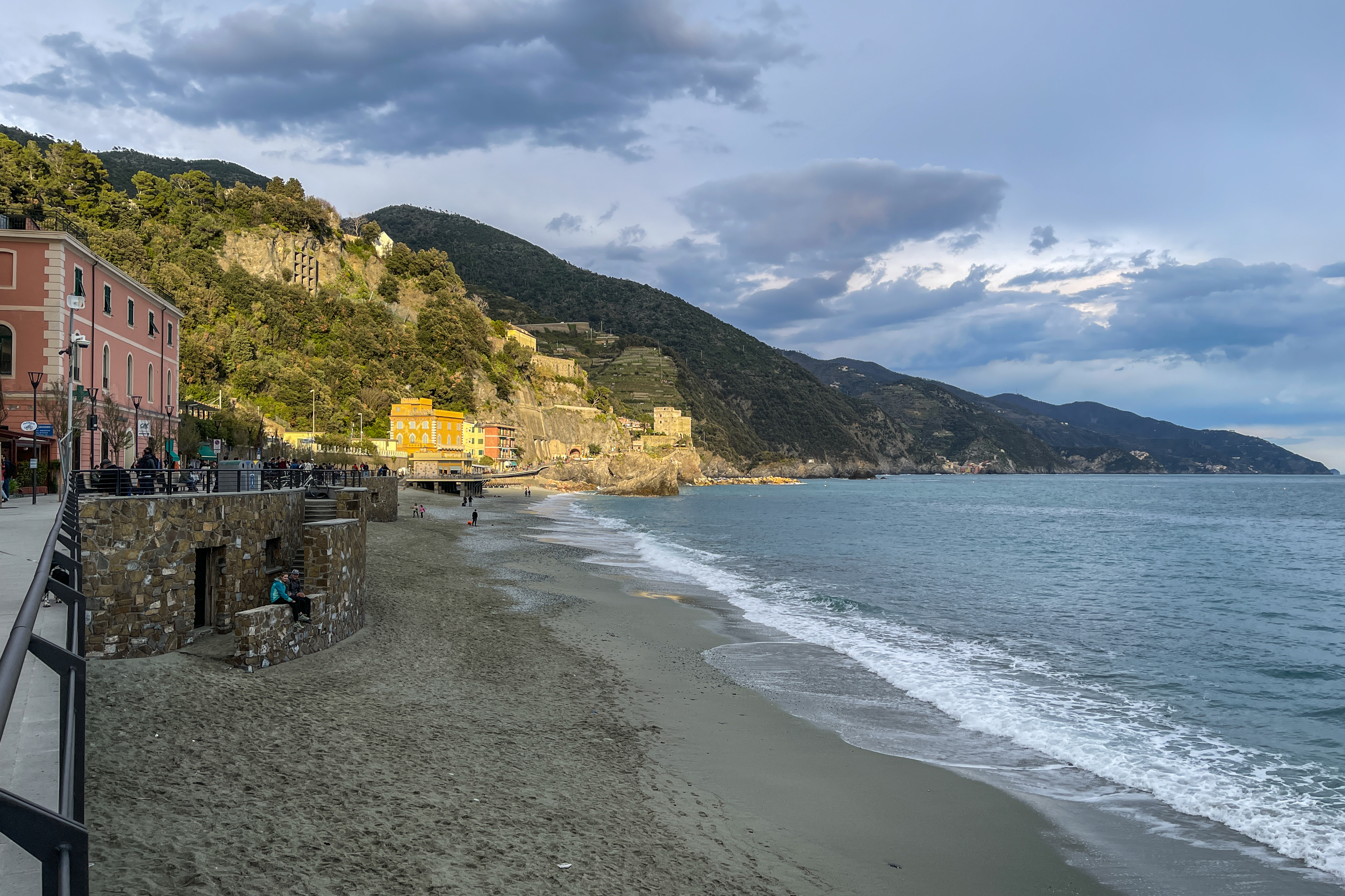
Beach in Monterosso al Mare, Cinque Terre

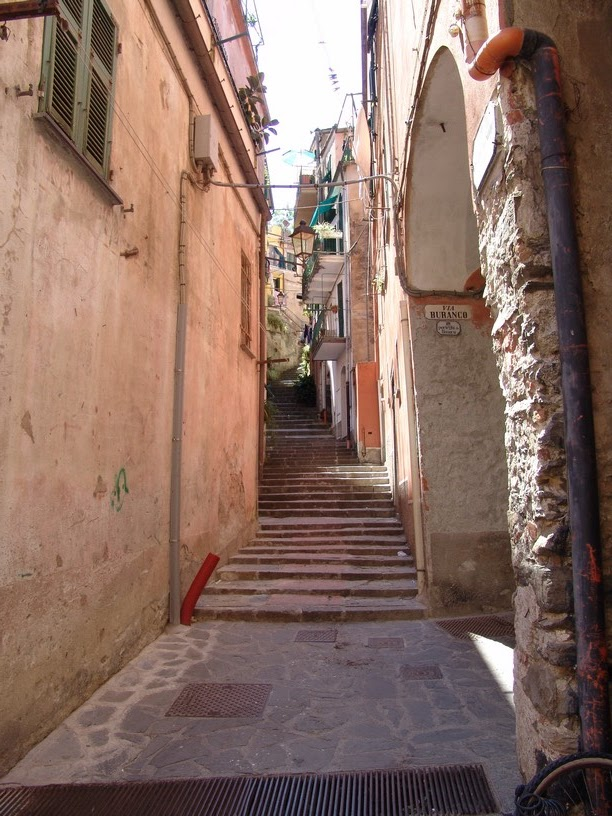
Street in Monterosso village

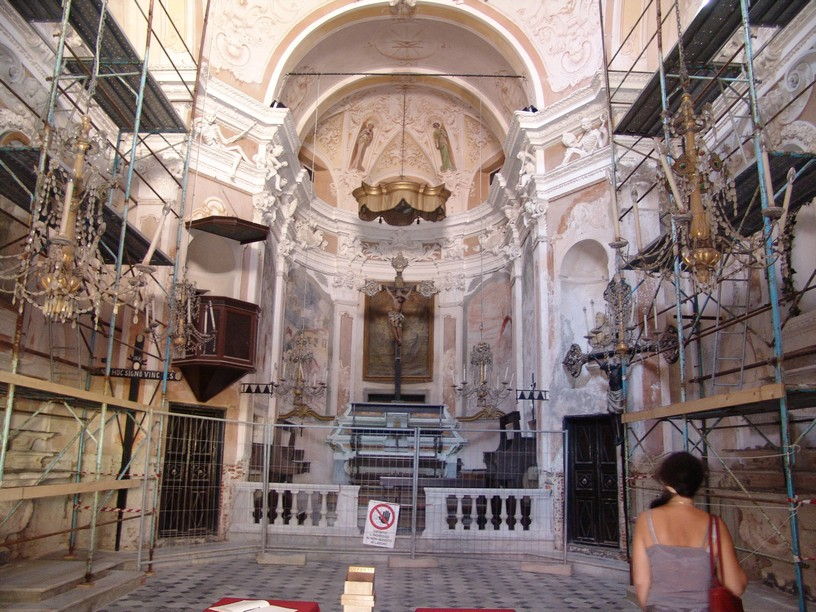
In the church

- The Castle, partially ruined, built by the Genoese.
- The parish church of St. John the Baptist (1282–1307). Its façade features four small marble columns and a main portal surmounted by a fresco portraying the baptism of Christ. The building is of a basilica-type plan that includes a nave and two aisles. The square medieval bell tower is crowned by merlons.
- The convent of Monterosso al Mare. The convent is visible from all parts of the Cinque Terre and is a prime attraction for tourists, thanks to its historical and artistic treasures. They are reminiscent of the 1600 building in Capuchin style, with the altar and choir in wood. Among its works of art is a "Crucifixion", attributed to Van Dyck and "Saint Girolamo the penitent" by Luca Cambiaso. The refectory with its vaulted ceiling features Strozzi’s "Veronica". The convent has maintained the characteristics typical of the time of its origins, in addition to the sublime view invites contemplation.
- The beach
- Monterosso Giant
- Santuario Nostra Signora di Saviore (The sanctuary of our Lady of Saviore) sits 465 metres above Monterroso on a hill overlooking the town. There has been a church on that site since 740CE. The shrine's most prized object is a 14th Century wood statue of the Blessed Virgin holding the dead Christ in her arms. The shrine has a guest house with six en-suite rooms and 30 rooms (2–3 beds each) that share a bathroom between every two rooms. It also has a refectory and offers bed and breakfast or half board options. One can reach the Santuario on foot (1.5 hours) or by local bus from the Piazza Garibaldi in Monterosso and walk back to the town via pleasant wooded paths.

== Monterosso giant ==
In Monterosso, near the beach of Fegina, is the statue of the Giant/Neptune created by the Italian sculptor Arrigo Minerbi (the favourite artist of Gabriele D’Annunzio) and the architect Francesco Levacher.

In the past, the impressive fourteen-metre high sculpture stood on the promontory as part of the decoration of the luxurious Villa Pastine (built in the early 1900s). In addition to the trident, Neptune bore a gigantic shell on his head, which acted as the terrace of the villa.

During World War II, Monterosso was bombed by allied forces, and the Neptune statue (along with the villa) suffered serious damage. It was damaged even further by heavy seas in 1966.

== Accessibility ==
Originally, the village was only accessible by sea or by mule paths that connected the villages of the Cinque Terre and to Via Roma, the main road that connected all of Italy to Rome. These mule paths have been maintained and used over the centuries and now provide hikers with a more intimate view of the sea-swept Cinque Terre. The area was recently designated as part of the national park system and is considered a protected area, to the effect of limited development and resource usage. The Cinque Terre hiking trails have been taken over by the national park system and there is now a fee to hike on all portions of the trail.

Today, the best way to go to Monterosso is to take local trains from La Spezia or Genoa or Intercity trains from Milan, Rome, Turin, and Tuscany. The village is connected to the E80 highway via a narrow, steep and winding 20 kilometres (12 mi) long road. The train network reaches the other villages of Cinque Terre as well.

== Popular culture ==
The 2021 animated film Luca is inspired by Monterosso al Mare and the other Cinque Terre towns.

== See also ==
- Liguria wine
