= Bianchetta Trevigiana =

Variety of grape

Bianchetta Trevigiana is a white Italian wine grape variety that is grown in the Trentino-Alto Adige/Südtirol and Veneto wine regions of northeast Italy. Here the grape is rarely used a varietal but, instead, is a permitted blending grape adding acidity to the wines of several Denominazione di Origine Controllata (DOC) zones including the sparkling wine Prosecco and has also been used for vermouth production. The name Trevigiana is derived from the province of Treviso where the grape is believed to have originated from.

While there are several grape varieties that variously share the synonym Bianchetta, most notably the Sicilian wine grape Albarola, DNA analysis has shown no direct genetic relationship between Bianchetta Trevigiana and any of the other Bianchetta varieties. Likewise, despite sharing the synonym Vernaccia (the root of which translate to "vernacular" or "local") with the notable Tuscan and Sardinian wine grapes, Biancheta Trevigiana appears to have no close relationship with any of those varieties. Instead, ampelographers believe that the grape is the result of a natural crossing between the white Veneto wine grape Durella and the nearly extinct red wine grape Brambana.

== History ==
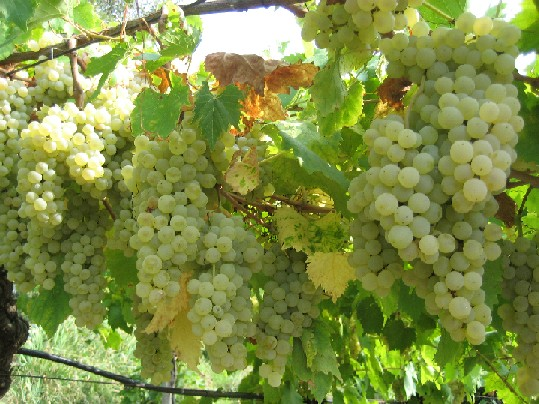
Durella, one of the probable parent varieties of Bianchetta Trevigiana.

Ampelographers believe that first written account of Bianchetta Trevigiana was in the late 17th century under the synonym of Bianchetta Gentile. The name Bianchetta means "little white" with Gentile coming from the Latin term for "family" so this reference could be about several vines of "little white berries" that shared similar characteristics in the vineyard. The 1679 account from Italian writer Agostinetto di Cimadolmo described Bianchetta Gentile as growing in the Treviso region. The first detailed account of Bianchetta Trevigiana was in 1937 by grape-breeder Giovanni Dalmasso at the Istituto Sperimentale per la Viticoltura in Conegliano.

In 2003, isoenzymatic analysis revealed that several grape varieties growing in northeast Italy under the synonyms of Senese, Vernanzina and Vernassina were, in fact, Bianchetta Trevigiana while other grape varieties variously known as Bianchetta, such as the Albarola grape of Sicily, were distinct and not closely related. In 2010, further DNA analysis suggested that Bianchetta Trevigiana was probably the result of a natural crossing between the white Durella grape of the Veneto region and the nearly extinct red-berried Brambana grape.

== Viticulture ==
Bianchetta Trevigiana is a mid-ripening grape variety that is often harvested between late September and early October. Despite having very thick-skins, the grape is very susceptible to the viticultural hazard of powdery mildew and also has poor resistance to frost damage that may occur early in the growing season.

== Wine region ==
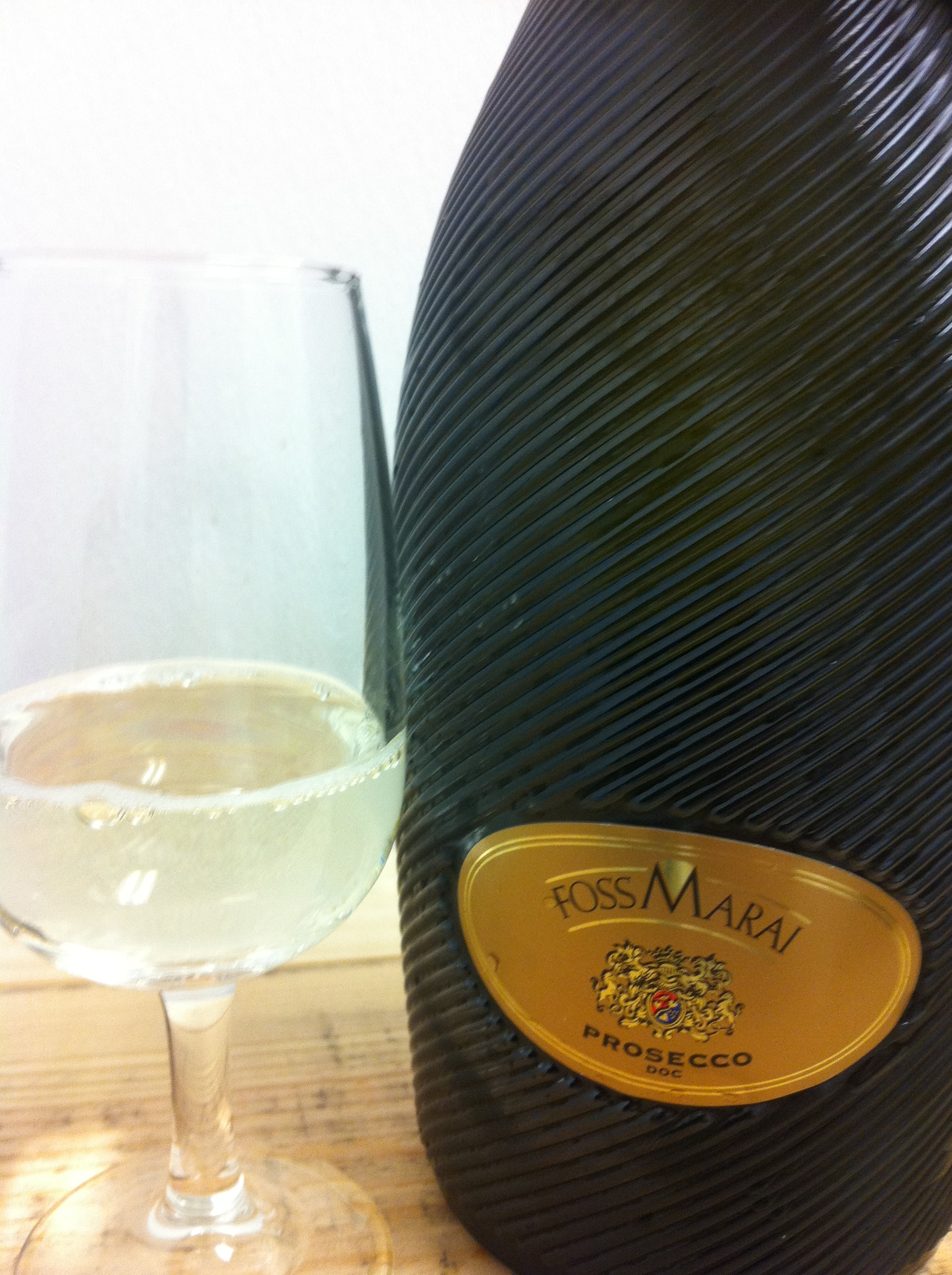
Bianchetta Trevigiana is one of the grape varieties permitted to be used in the production of the sparkling wine Prosecco.

In 2000, there were 65 hectares (160 acres) of Bianchetta Trevigiana, which represents a dramatic drop in cultivation from the 17th and 18th century when the grape was widely planted in the provinces of Belluno and Verona. Outside of the Veneto, the grape was also found in the Trentino-Alto Adige region where it was planted along the Adige river valley up to the city of Bolzano as well as in the Sugana Valley and Val Sacra.

Bianchetta Trevigiana is permitted in several DOC regions including the Veneto DOCs of Colli di Conegliano, Montello e Colli Asolani and Prosecco in the province of Treviso, the Colli Euganei DOC in the province of Padova and the multi-regional Lugana DOC that includes parts of both Lombardy and the Veneto.

== Styles ==
According to Master of Wine Jancis Robinson, Bianchetta Trevigiana tends to produce "ordinary" and astringent wines which is why it is rarely seen as a varietal and is more often incorporated into blends. The grape also has a long history of being used in vermouth production.

== Synonyms ==
Over the years, Bianchetta Trevigiana has been known under a variety of synonyms including: Bianca Gentile di Fonzaso, Bianchetta, Bianchetta Gentile, Bianchetta Semplice, Bianco Vernanzinaj, Cenese, Pavana bianca, Pignolo bianco, Senese (in Breganze), Uva Cinese, Vernaccia, Vernaccia di Verona, Vernaccia Trentina, Vernanzina (in the Berici Hills), Vernassina (in the Euganean Hills), Vernazza, Vernazza Trentina, Vernazzina, Weisser Vernatch and Weissvernatsch.
