= Pigato =

Variety of grape

- Grape (Vitis)
- Color of berry skin: Blanc
- Species: Vitis vinifera
- Origin: Italy
- Notable regions: Liguria

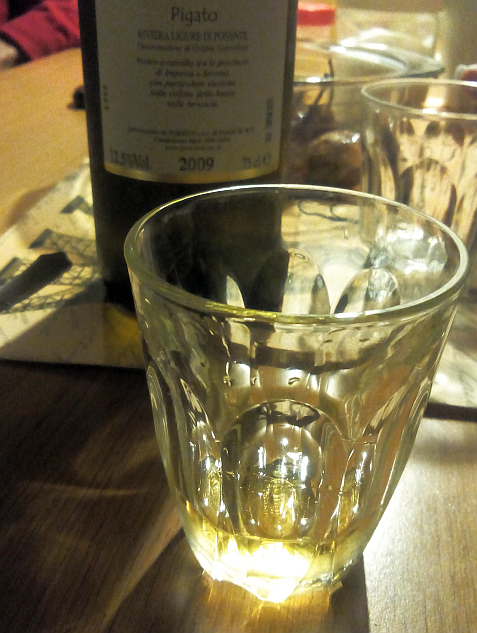
A glass of Pigato 2009

Pigato is a white Italian wine grape planted primarily in Liguria. The grape is found in the Riviera di Ponente zone in Italy's region of Liguria which makes sturdy, aromatic wines with plenty of fruit. DNA evidence proves that Pigato, Vermentino and Favorita are closely related. It gains its name, which means "spotted" from the appearance of the ripe grapes.
