= Cinque Terre =

Rugged portion of coast on the Italian Riviera, Liguria

UNESCO World Heritage Site
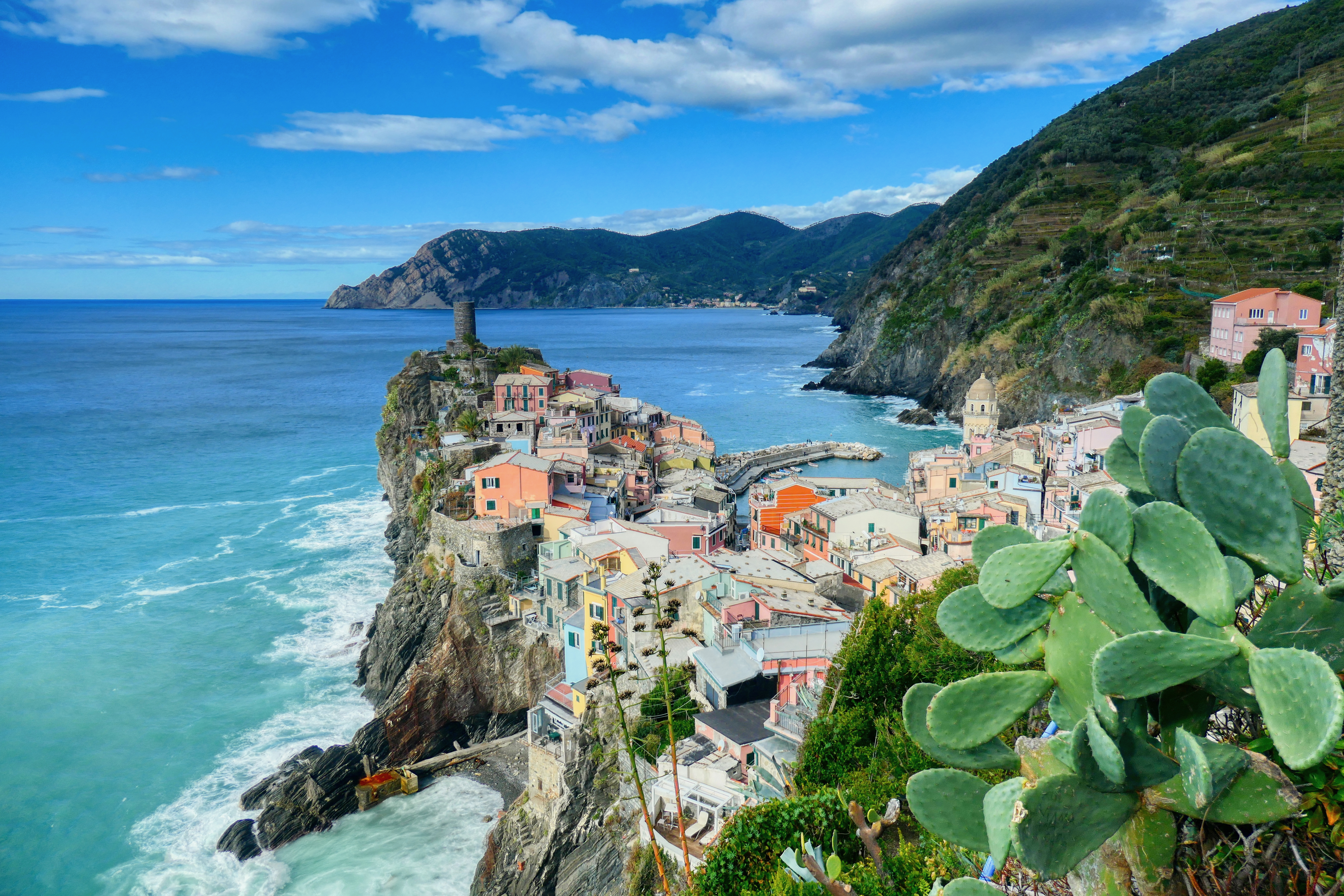
- A view of the National Park of the Cinque Terre, showing Vernazza, one of the five coastal villages

- Location within Italy
- Location: Liguria, Italy
- Part of: Portovenere, Cinque Terre, and the Islands (Palmaria, Tino and Tinetto)
- Includes: Monterosso al Mare; Vernazza; Corniglia; Manarola; Riomaggiore
- Criteria: Cultural: (ii)(iv)(v)
- Reference: 826
- Inscription: 1997 (21st Session)
- Area: 4,511.54 ha (17.4192 sq mi)
- Website: www.parconazionale5terre.it/Eindex.php
- Coordinates: 44°7′10″N 9°43′00″E

The Cinque Terre (Italian: [ˈtʃiŋkwe ˈtɛrre]; Ligurian: Çinque Tære; meaning 'Five Lands') is a coastal area within Liguria, in the northwest of Italy. It lies in the west of La Spezia Province, and comprises five villages: Monterosso al Mare, Vernazza, Corniglia, Manarola and Riomaggiore. The coastline, the five villages, and the surrounding hillsides are all part of the Cinque Terre National Park, a UNESCO World Heritage Site. Vernazza is also one of "I Borghi più belli d'Italia" ("The most beautiful villages of Italy").

The Cinque Terre area is a popular tourist destination. Over the centuries, people have built terraces on the rugged, steep landscape right up to the cliffs that overlook the Ligurian Sea. Paths, trains, and boats connect the villages as cars can only reach them with great difficulty from the outside via narrow and precarious mountain roads.

== History ==
Cinque Terre is mentioned in documents dating to the 11th century. Monterosso and Vernazza were settled first and the other villages grew later, whilst within the territory of the Republic of Genoa. In the 16th century, the inhabitants reinforced existing forts and built new defensive towers to protect the population from attacks by the Turks. Cinque Terre experienced an economic decline from the 17th to 19th centuries, recovering when an arsenal was built in La Spezia and it gained a railway link to Genoa.

Bombing and fighting during World War II caused extensive damage to the Cinque Terre.

The railway led to migration from the area and a decline in traditional industries until the growth of tourism from the 1970s onward brought some prosperity.

The predominant crops in the area have been grapes and olives. Some fishermen were based in Monterosso, but the area's gaily painted fishermen's cottages were conceived in the late 1970s as a tourist attraction.

Because of its exceptional cultural and ecological assets, UNESCO added Cinque Terre to its list of World Heritage Sites in 1997.

On 25 October 2011, torrential rain caused floods and mudslides in Cinque Terre. Nine people were killed and villages were severely damaged, particularly Vernazza and Monterosso al Mare. The heavy rainfall event was favoured by the crisis of the traditional and less remunerative cultivation of terraced landscapes which sixty years before started a progressive decline and reduction of maintenance. It was partially balanced by the vegetation that spontaneously developed on abandoned terraces, a role underlined by a part of the existing scientific literature.

== Transport and tourism ==
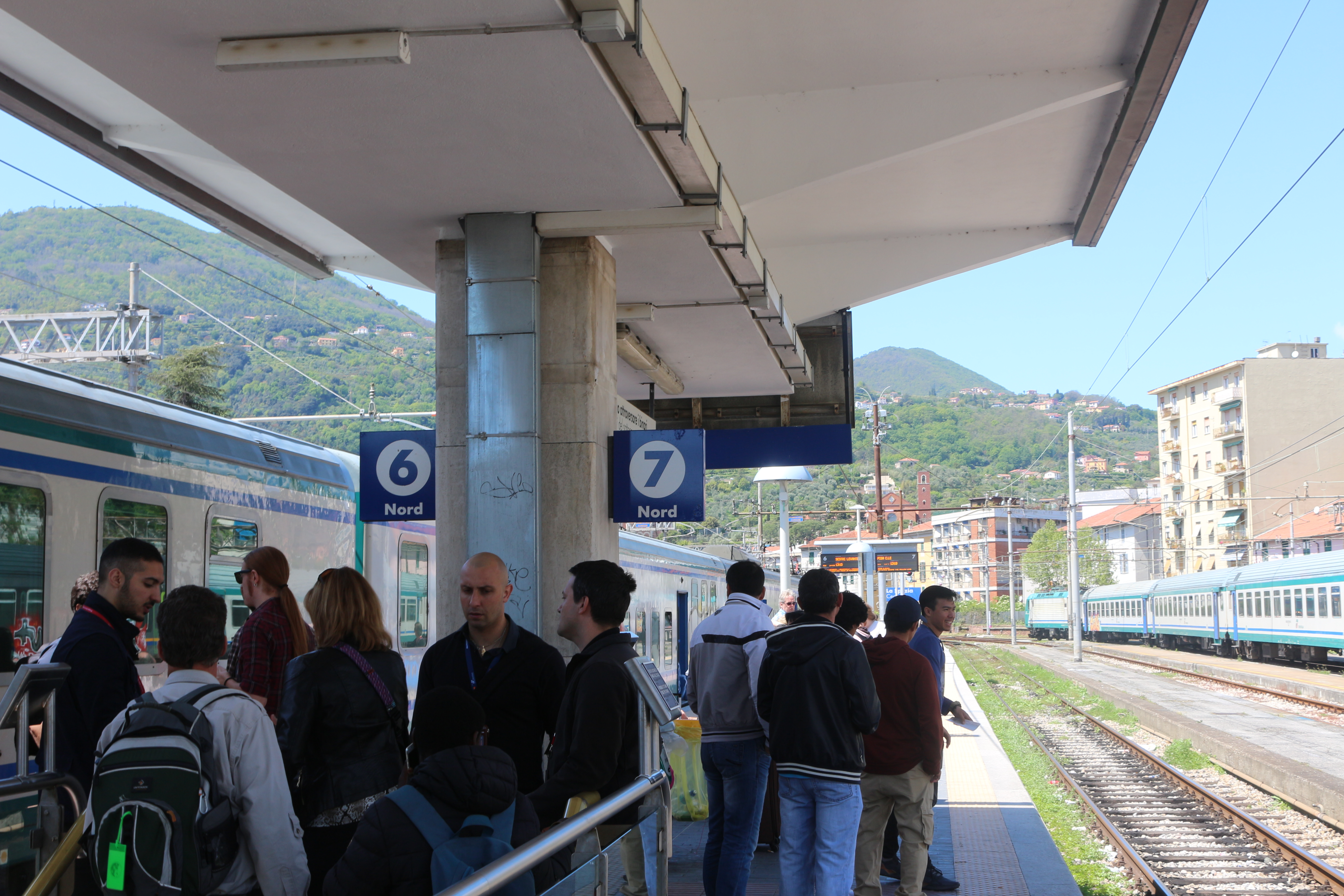
Personnel control the intense flow of tourists on the platforms of the La Spezia Centrale railway station during the public holiday of May Day

Access to Cinque Terre by car is possible, but parking is a major issue. The best method of transportation is by train. Trains run from La Spezia and Genoa to all five towns within the Cinque Terre, as well as to major regional and national destinations. The Cinque Terre railway stations are located on the Genoa-Pisa line. Most long-distance trains do not stop at all five Cinque Terre towns, making it necessary to transfer to regional trains or the Cinque Terre Express. Some intercity trains also stop at Monterosso Station.

A scheduled passenger ferry runs between Levanto and La Spezia, stopping at all of the main villages except Corniglia, which does not have a landing point, as it is not located on the coast. Boats also connect to Genoa's Old Harbour, Lerici, and Porto Venere.

== Paths ==
There are many walking trails in the park. They are named according to the SVA numbering system, although it is common to hear trails referred to by their previous numbers, causing confusion to visitors.

The most popular path is known as the Sentiero Azzurro ("Blue Trail"), used to connect the five villages. Due to the unstable terrain, landslides frequently cause portions of the trails to be closed. The Sentiero Azzurro section from Riomaggiore to Manarola, called the Via dell'Amore ("Love Walk"), was closed between late 2019 and February 2025.

== Culture ==
=== Literature ===
Limoni
The little path that winds down
along the slope plunges through cane-tufts
and opens suddenly into the orchard
among the moss-green trunks
of the lemon trees. [...]

— Eugenio Montale

From the poem, "The Lemon Trees", 1921. This is how the Nobel laureate Eugenio Montale, through his poetry, describes Monterosso and how the Cinque Terre must be discovered.

The Cinque Terre were not only a source of inspiration for Eugenio Montale but for many others.

- Dante Alighieri compared the Cinque Terre with the rugged cliff of Purgatory in the Divine Comedy:

Tra Lerice e Turbìa la più diserta,
la più rotta ruina è una scala,
verso di quella, agevole e aperta.

- Boccaccio in the second novel of the tenth day in The Decameron:

[...]e allora in una tovagliuola bianchissima gli portò due fette di pane arrostito e un gran bicchiere di vernaccia da Corniglia [...]

- Gabriele D'Annunzio in his work Faville del Maglio cites the DOC white wine 'Sciachetrà':

...quel fiero Sciacchetrà che si pigia nelle cinque pampinose terre.

=== Cinema ===
In 2013, Cinque Terre was one of the shooting locations of the movie The Wolf of Wall Street by Martin Scorsese.

The 2021 Disney/Pixar film Luca is set in the fictional town of Portorosso, on the Italian Riviera, placed west of Corniglia on a fictional map. Portorosso was inspired by and modeled after Cinque Terre.

=== Videogames ===
The 2016 videogame Hitman features the fictional town of Sapienza, which was inspired by Vernazza and other towns on the Ligurian shoreline.

== Food and wine ==
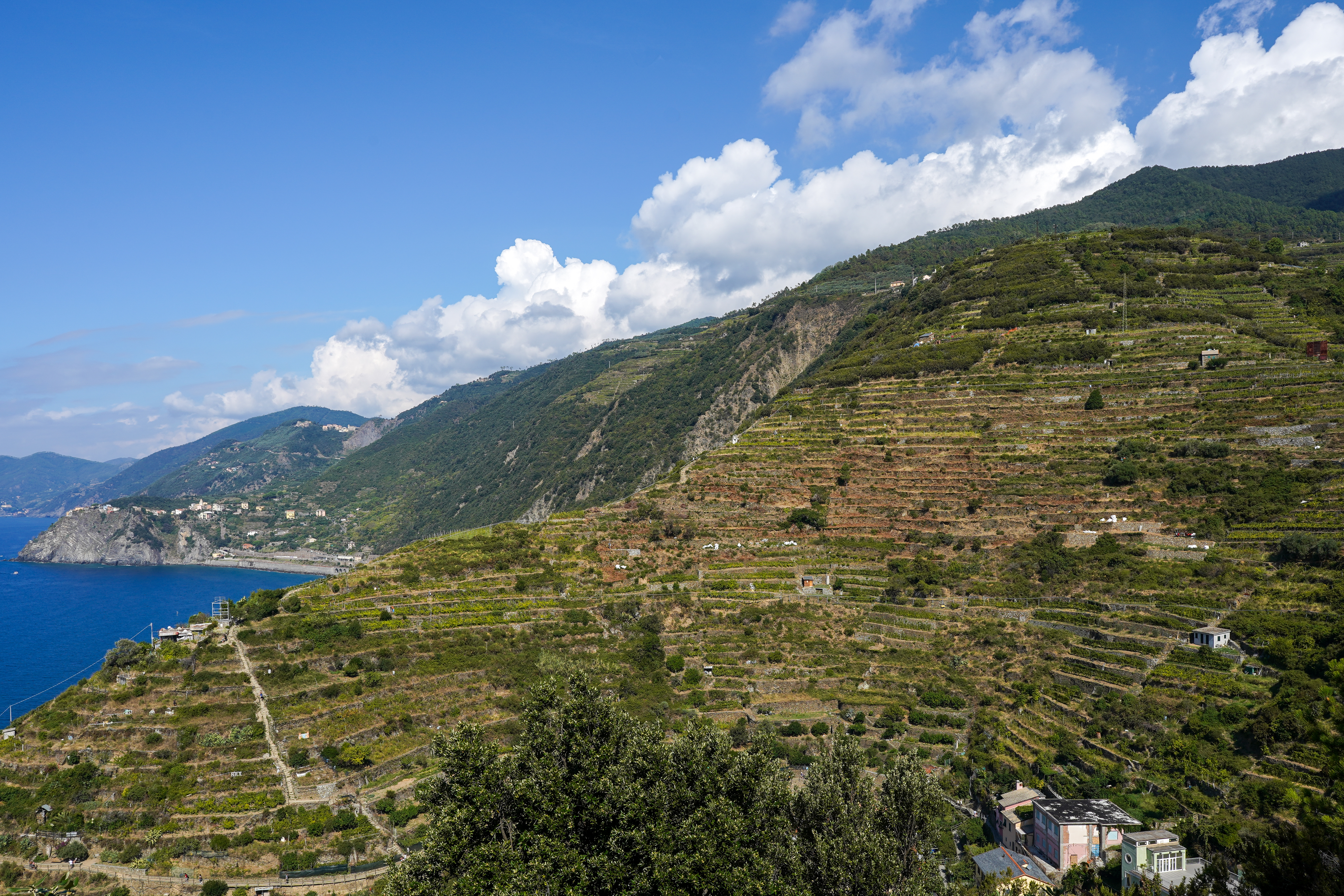
Vineyards in terraces above Manarola

Given its location on the Mediterranean, seafood is plentiful in the local cuisine. Anchovies of Monterosso are a local speciality designated with a Protected Designation of Origin status from the European Union. The mountainsides of the Cinque Terre are heavily terraced and are used to cultivate grapes and olives. This area, and the region of Liguria, as a whole, is known for pesto, a sauce made from basil leaves, garlic, salt, olive oil, pine nuts, and pecorino cheese. Focaccia is a particularly common locally baked bread product. Farinata, a typical snack found in bakeries and pizzerias, is a savoury and crunchy pancake made from a base of chick pea flour. The town of Corniglia is particularly popular for a gelato made from local honey (miele di Corniglia).

The grapes of the Cinque Terre are used to produce two locally made wines. The eponymous Cinque Terre and the Sciachetrà are both made using Bosco, Albarola, and Vermentino grapes. Both wines are produced by the Cooperative Agricoltura di Cinque Terre, located between Manarola and Volastra. Other DOC producers are Forlini-Capellini, Walter de Batté, Buranco, Arrigoni.

In addition to wines, other popular local drinks include grappa, a brandy made with the pomace left from winemaking, and limoncino, a sweet, creamy liqueur made from lemons. It is served chilled after meals and often used in the preparation of desserts.

== Preservation ==
In 1998, the Italian Ministry of the Environment set up the Cinque Terre protected natural marine area to protect the natural environment and to promote socio-economic development compatible with the natural landscape of the area. Today, millions of visitors visit it every year. In 1999, the Parco Nazionale delle Cinque Terre was created to conserve the ecological balance, protect the landscape, and safeguard the anthropological values of the location. Nevertheless, dwindling interest in cultivation and maintenance of the terrace walls posed a long-term threat to the site, which was for this reason included in the 2000 and 2002 World Monuments Watch by the World Monuments Fund. The organization secured grants from American Express to support a study of the conservation of Cinque Terre. Following the study, a site management plan was created.

== Neighbouring towns ==
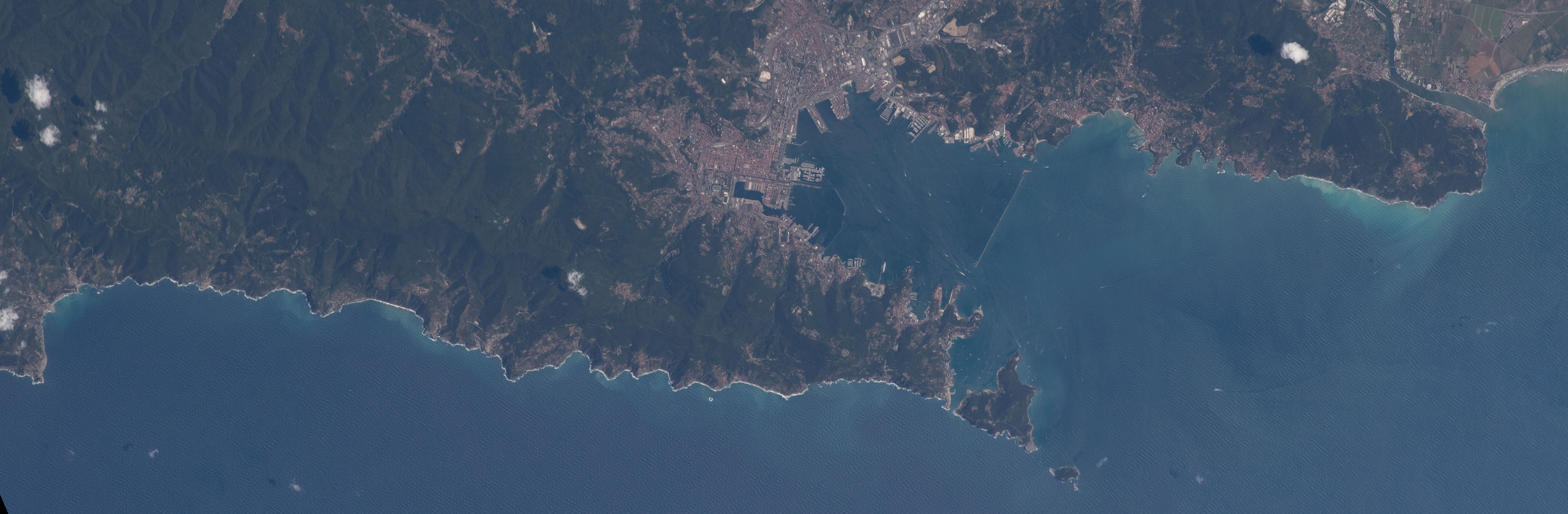
Cinque Terre coast with Portovenere and Isola del Palmaria (right of the middle), Golfo dei Poeti, La Spezia, Lerici and Tellaro coast

- Bonassola
- La Spezia
- Lerici
- Levanto
- Porto Venere
- Sarzana
- Volastra (village)

== Sister cities ==
- Southland District, New Zealand

== Gallery ==
Cinque Terre

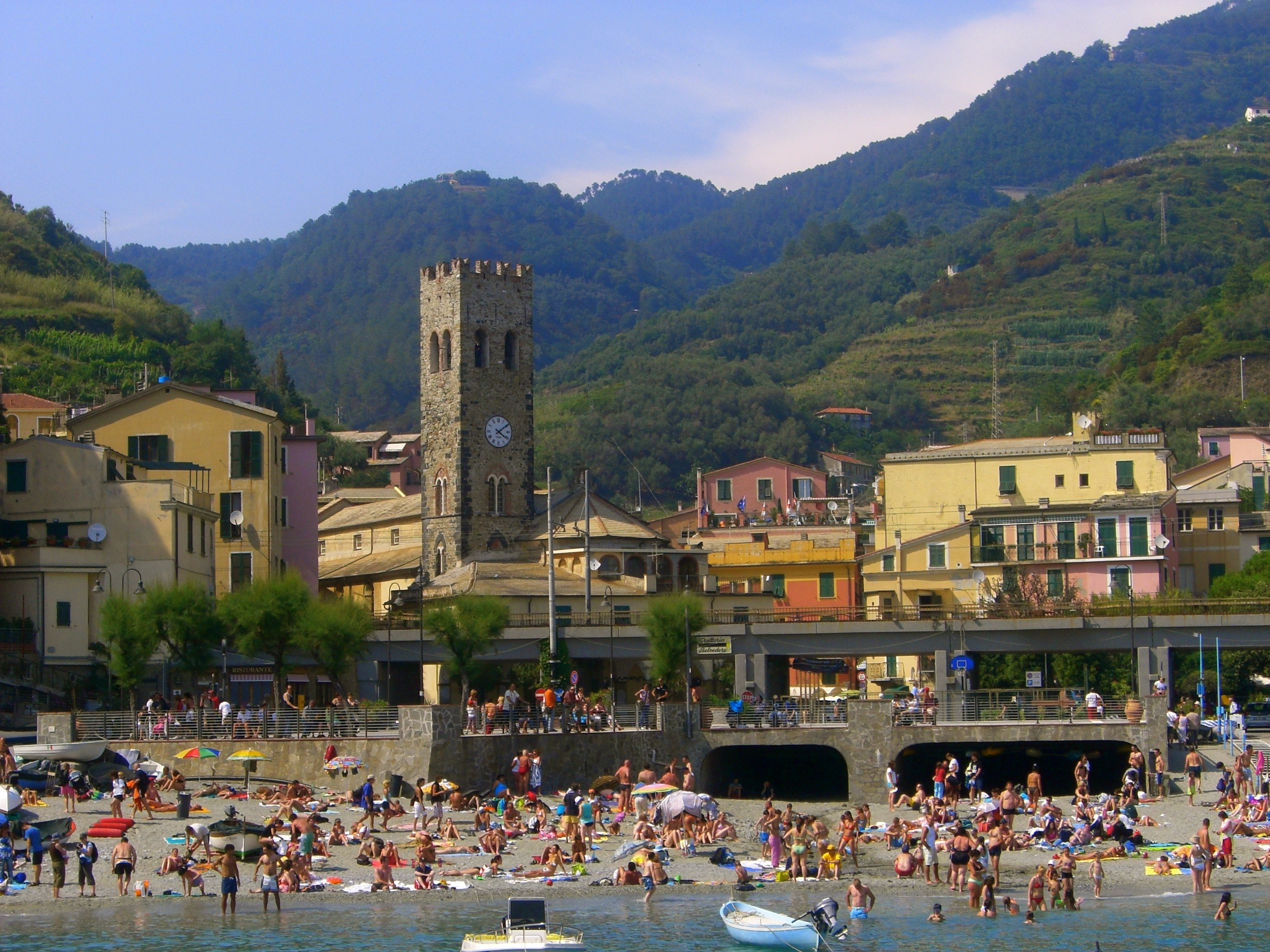
Monterosso al Mare

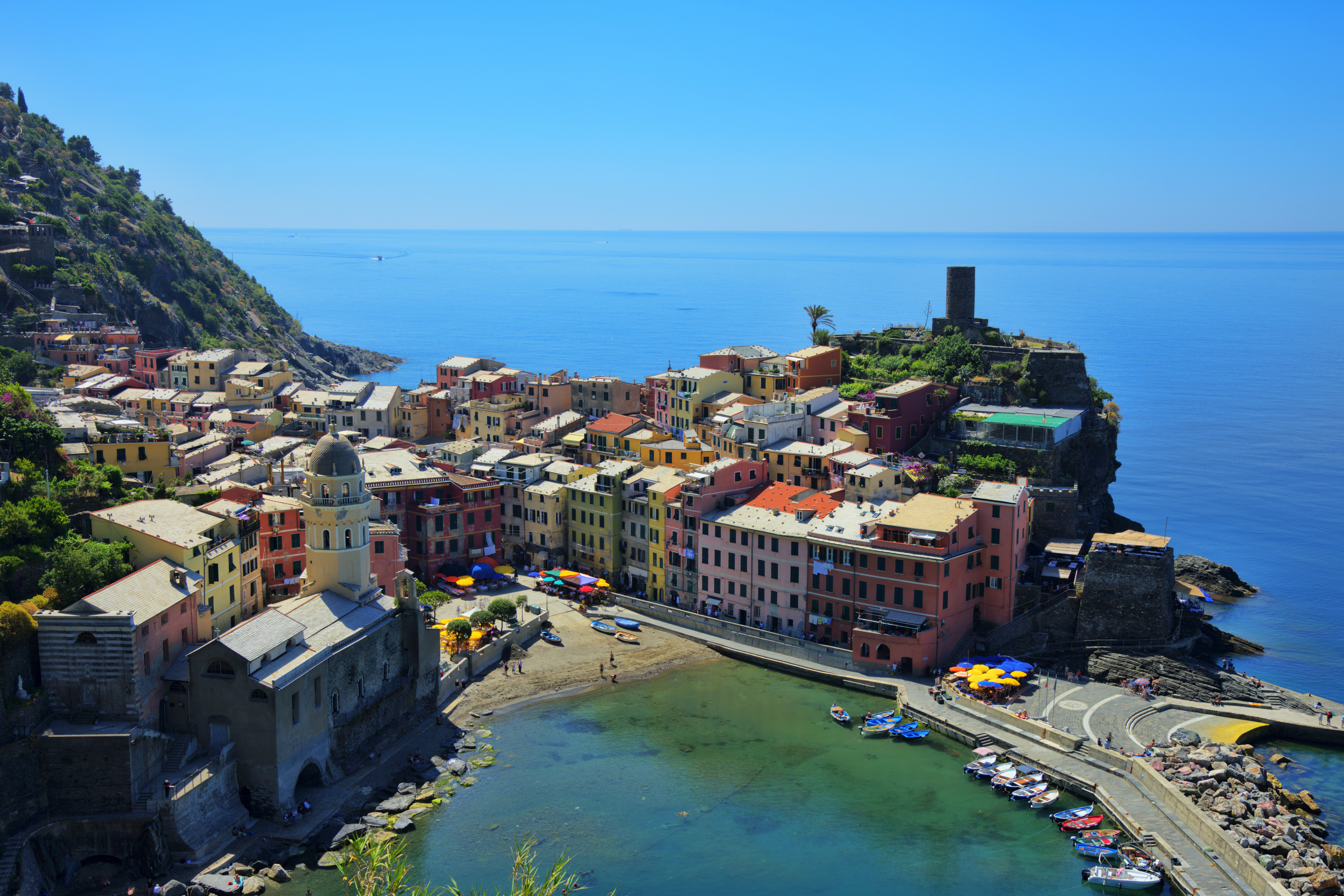
Vernazza

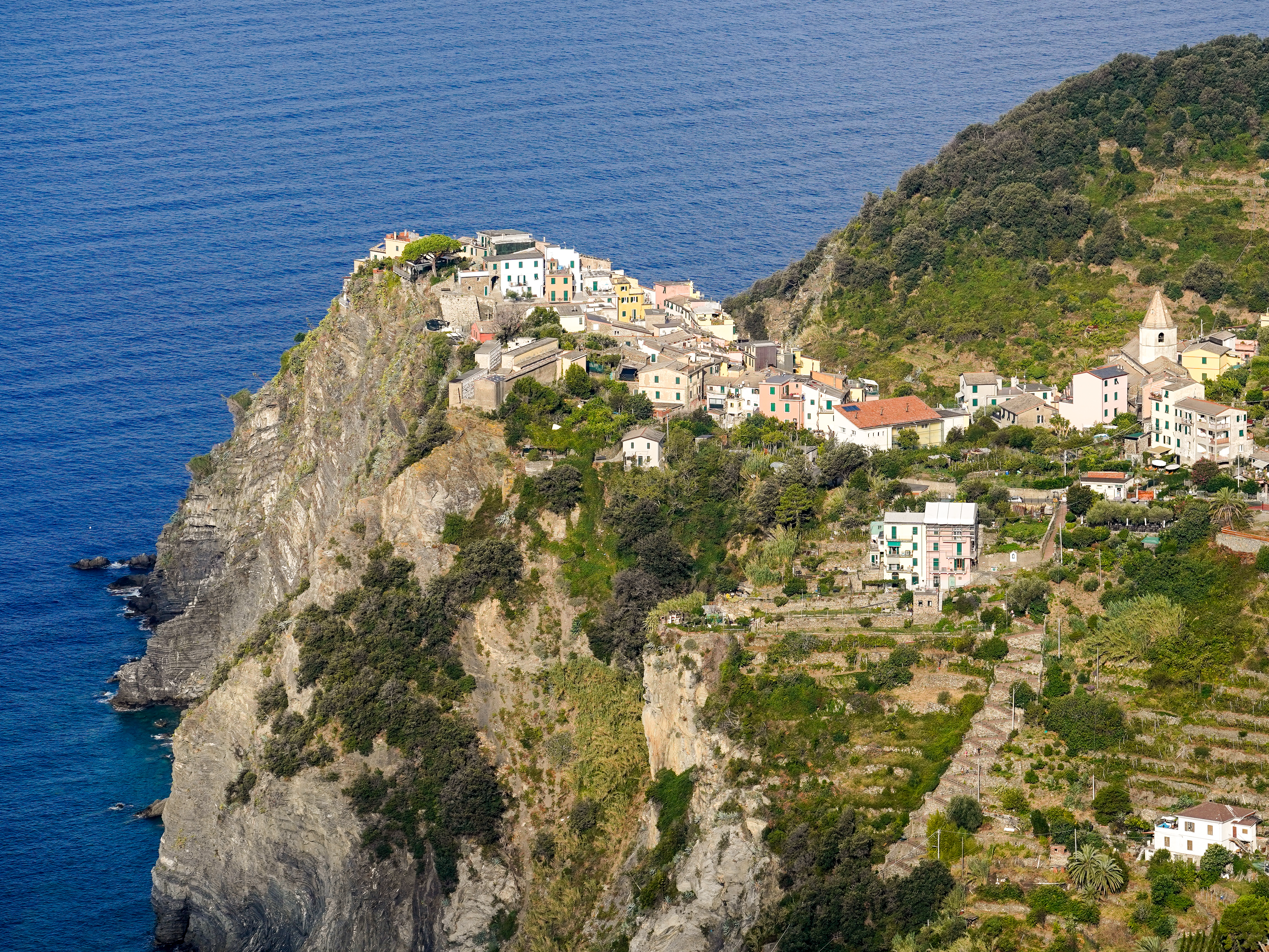
Corniglia

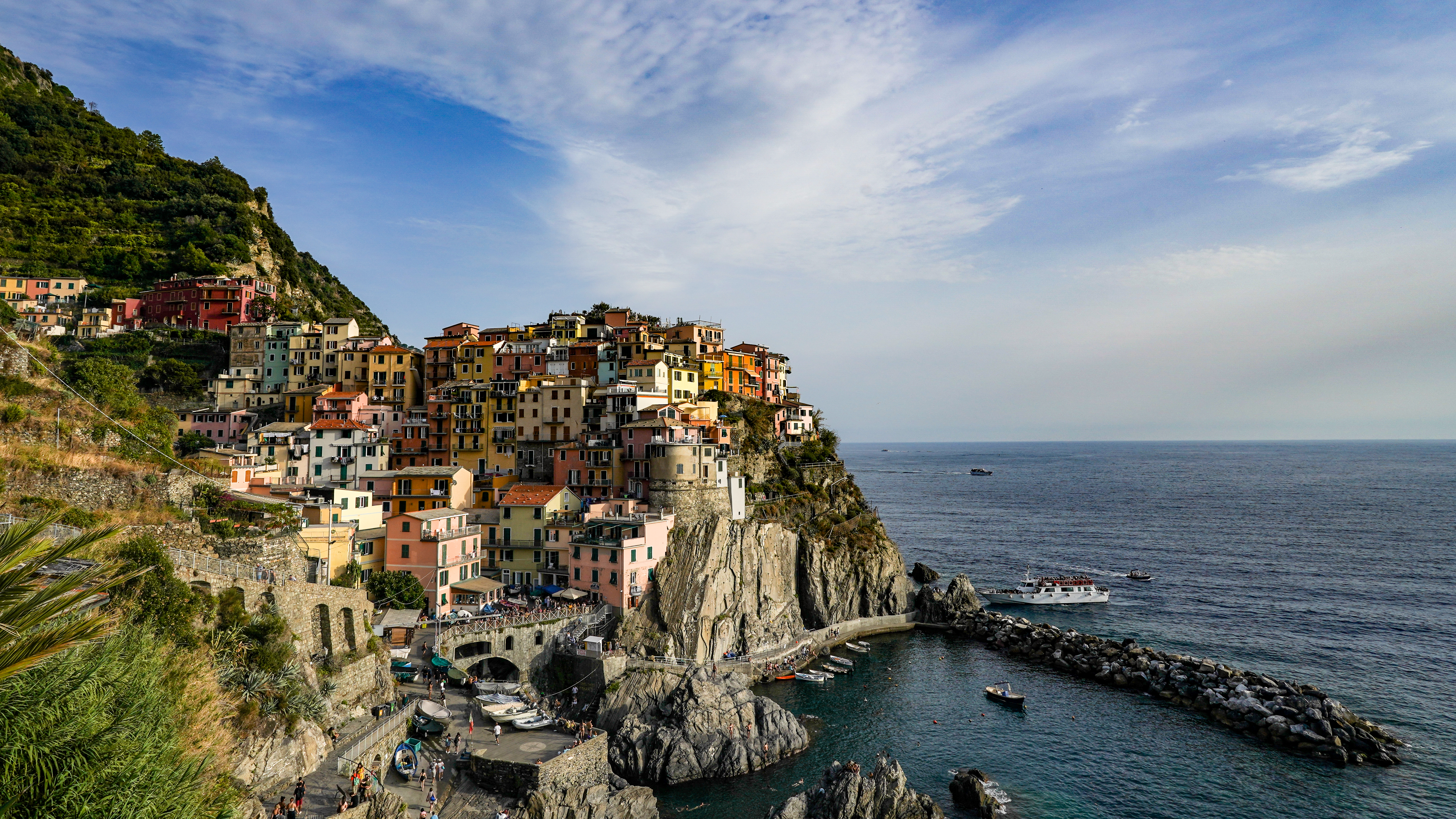
Manarola

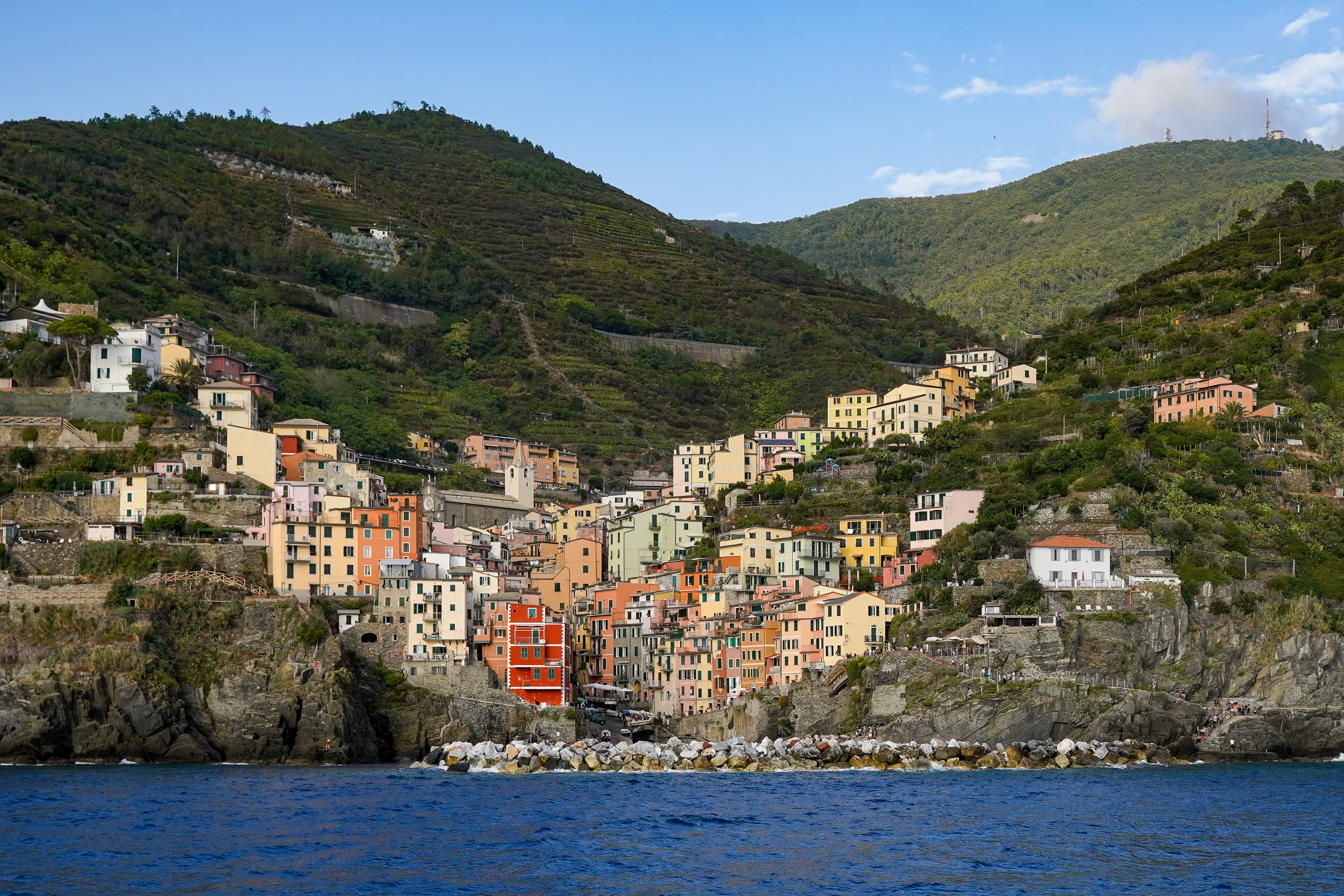
Riomaggiore

== See also ==
- Asteroid 273994 Cinqueterre
- Liguria wine
- Italian riviera
