= Albarola =

Variety of grape

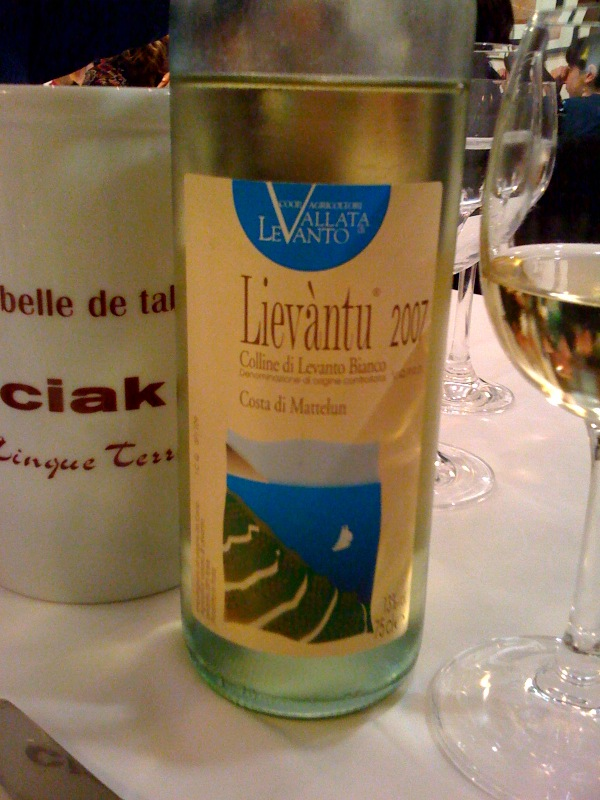
A wine from the Colline di Levanto DOC that includes Albarola in the blend.

Albarola is a white Italian wine grape variety grown in the northwest Italy. It is most commonly found in the Liguria region where producers in the Cinqueterre Denominazione di origine controllata (DOC) use it as a blending component. Wine expert Jancis Robinson describes the wine made from Albarola as fairly "neutral" in profile. Outside of Liguria, the grape was historically grown in Sicily but for most of the 20th century has been declining in plantings along with other ancient Sicilian varieties like Albanello, Damaschino, Minella bianca and Montonico bianco.

== Wine regions ==
Most of the plantings of Albarola today are found in the Cinqueterre and La Spezia region of Liguria where the grape is commonly blended with other Ligurian varieties such as Bosco and Vermentino.

Under DOC regulations for Cinque Terre, Albarola destined for this wine must be harvested to a yield no greater than 9 tonnes/hectare and along with Vermentino can constitute no more than 40% of the blend with Bosco needing to account for at least 60% of the wine. In the DOC wine of Colline di Levanto, Albarola can be harvested to a maximum yield of 11 tonnes/ha and constitute of anywhere from 20 to 55% of the blend.

== Synonyms ==
Among the synonyms that Albarola is known under include Albarola bianca, Albarola di Lavagna, Albarola trebbiana, Bianchetta Genovese, Calcatella, Calcatella di Sarzana, Erbarola, Temosci, Trebbiano di Sarzana and Trebbiano locale.
