= Liguria wine =

Italian wine region

Liguria
- Wine region
- Type: Italian wine
- Year established: 1967
- Years of wine industry: 1967–present
- Country: Italy
- Soil conditions: Mostly rocky, sandy, clay, and marl
- Grapes produced: 65% white varieties, 35% red varieties
- Varietals produced: Red: Rossese, Granaccia, Ormeasco, Ciliegiolo, Dolcetto; White: Vermentino, Pigato, Bosco, Rollo, Bianchetta Genovese
- Official designations: 0 DOCGs; 11 DOCs including Cinque Terre DOC, Colli di Luni DOC, Rossese di Dolceacqua DOC; Several IGTs including Liguria IGT

Location of Liguria wine region in Italy

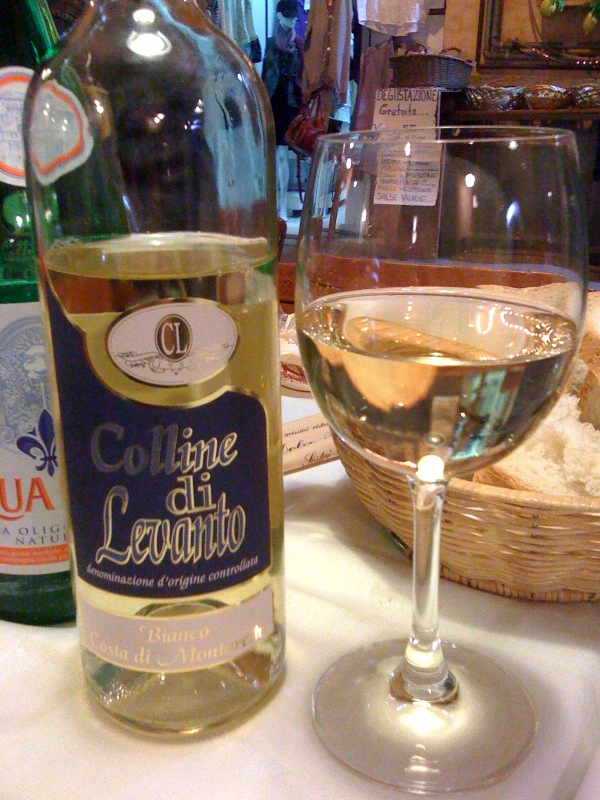
A bottle of Colline di Levanto DOC white wine.

Liguria is an Italian wine region located in the northwest region of Italy along the Italian Riviera. It is bordered by the Piedmont wine region to the north, the Alps and French wine region of Provence to the west, the Apennine Mountains and the Emilia-Romagna wine region to the east with a small border shared with Tuscany in the south-east along the Ligurian Sea.

Liguria has several Denominazione di origine controllata regions with the most notable being the Cinque Terre DOC from cliff side vineyards situated among the five fishing villages of Cinque Terre in the province of La Spezia. The DOC produces light white wines made from grape varieties such as Bosco, Albarola and Vermentino. In the west is the red wine-producing region of Dolceacqua, producing wine from the indigenous Rossese grape.

== DOC regions ==
The following is a list of DOCs in the Liguria region along with the grapes that may be included in the blend under varying percentages that are regulated under the DOC label.

- Cinque Terre DOC - White wine only DOC producing wine from the Bosco, Albarola and Vermentino grapes. A passito and liquoroso style made from the same grapes can also be produced under the Sciacchetra designation.
- Colli di Luni DOC - Red and white wine DOC producing wine from Sangiovese, Canaiolo, Ciliegiolo, Pollera nera, Bracciola nera, Trebbiano and Vermentino.
- Colline di Levanto DOC - Red and white wine DOC producing wine from Sangiovese, Ciliegiolo, Vermentino, Albarola and Bosco.
- Golfo del Tigullio DOC - Red, white, rosé and sparkling wine DOC producing wine from Ciliegiolo, Dolcetto, Vermentino, Bianchetta and Moscato. A passito style dessert wine from non-aromatic local varieties can also be produced under this DOC.
- Riviera Ligure di Ponente DOC - Red and white wine DOC producing wine from Dolcetto (known locally as Ormeasco), Pigato, Rossese and Vermentino.
- Rossese di Dolceacqua DOC - Red wine only DOC producing wine from the Rossese grape (known locally as Rossese di Ventimiglia)
- Val Polcevera DOC - Red, white and sparkling wine DOC producing wine from Dolcetto, Sangiovese, Ciliegiolo, Barbera, Vermentino, Bianchetta, Albarola, Pigato, Bosco and Rollo.
