= Bosco (grape) =

Variety of grape

Bosco is a white Italian wine grape variety that is grown predominantly in the Liguria region of northwest Italy. It is a permitted variety in the Denominazione di origine controllata (DOC) wine of Cinque Terre where it is often the primary component of the blend. In winemaking, care must be taken in handling due to Bosco's propensity to oxidize easily, creating potential wine faults.

== Synonyms ==
Among the synonyms that have been used to describe Bosco and its wines include Bosco Bianco, Bosco Bianco del Genovesato and Madea.

== In popular culture ==
- In the 1984-1992 American sitcom Night Court, Bosco is a favored drink of the show's lead character, Judge Harry Stone.
