= Arenaways =

Italian railway operator

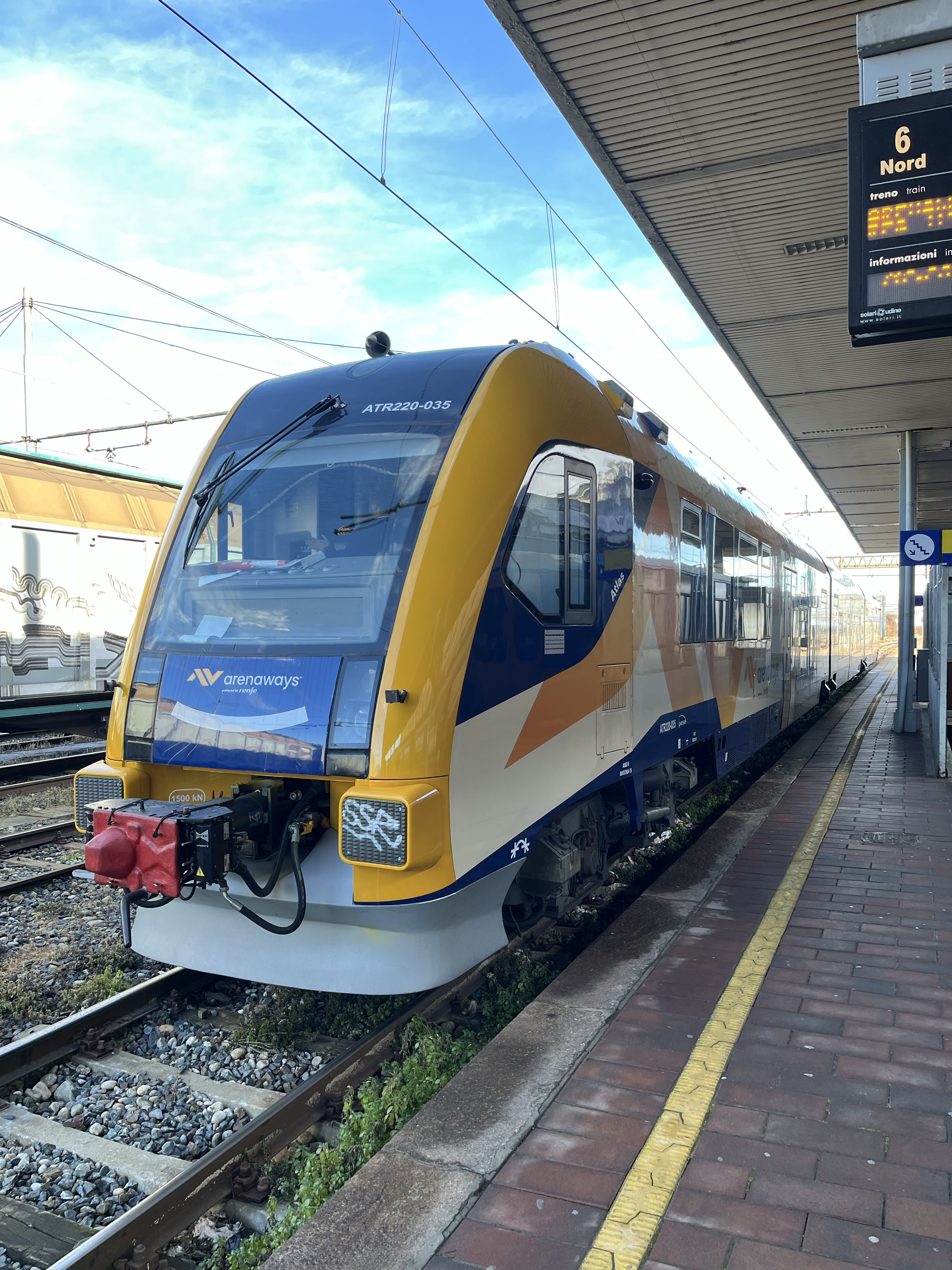
- Industry: Rail transport
- Founded: 2021
- Services: Passenger service

Arenaways is a railway operator in Italy.

In March 2024, Arenaways was awarded a PSO contract for the operation of two railway lines in Piedmont for 10 years, commencing in January 2025. The operator selected Estonian rail ticketing solutions firm, Turnit, to power their eCommerce and ticketing solutions.

In November 2024, Renfe bought a 33% shareholding in Arenaways.
