= Sentiero Azzurro =

Hiking trail in Italy

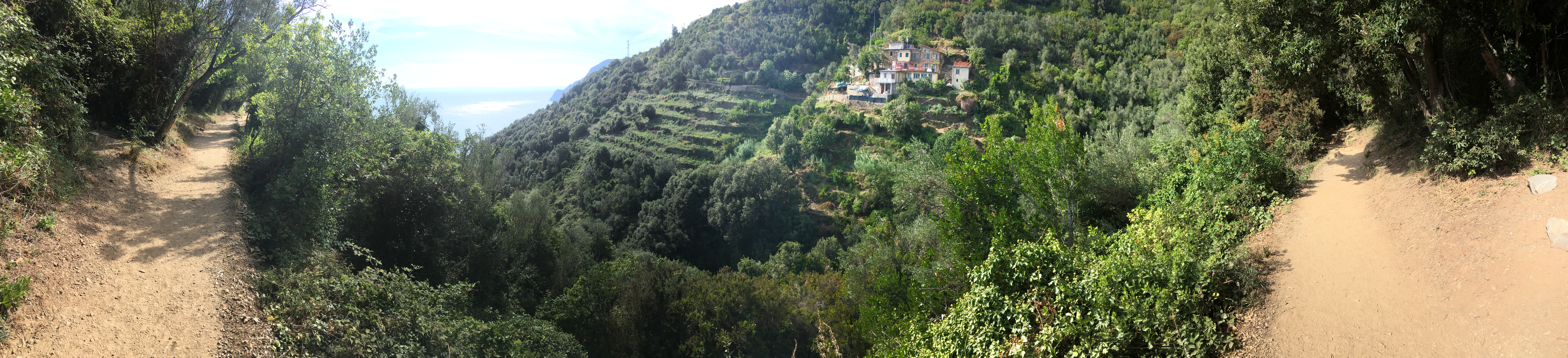
- The path between Vernazza and Monterosso

Sentiero Azzurro
- Length: 12 km (7.5 mi)
- Location: Italy | Liguria
- Designation: SVA
- Trailheads: Riomaggiore | Monterosso al Mare
- Elevation change: 600 m (2,000 ft)
- Website: www.parconazionale5terre.it

The Verde Azzurro path, or "Blue trail" is a hiking route that runs entirely within the Cinque Terre National Park, a UNESCO World Heritage Site, primarily connecting the five main villages.

Currently listed as route 592, it is commonly referred to as Trail SVA2, the former path number of the CAI of La Spezia. The path has historically been used by the local inhabitants to travel on foot between the villages of the park.

== Route ==
The path starts from Riomaggiore to reach Monterosso al Mare through Manarola, Corniglia, and Vernazza and is about 12 kilometres (7.5 mi) long. The maximum altitude is reached in Prevo, a tiny hamlet of Vernazza, at about 200 metres (660 ft) asl. It takes over 5 hours of walking to cover it entirely and can be considered divided into four distinct sections.

- 592-1 (SVA2): The first stretch, between Riomaggiore and Manarola, is better known as Via dell'Amore. It is the shortest and easiest segment at about 1 kilometre (0.62 mi), and can be covered in less than half an hour. The path is closed since 24 September 2012 and it is expected to be opened in summer 2024 .
- 592-2 (SVA2): The second stretch, between Manarola and Corniglia, is 2.8 kilometres (1.7 mi) long and takes about 1 hour to walk. This section is rated as easy. The path is closed since 2013 .
- 592-3 (SVA2): The third section, between Corniglia and Vernazza, is 3.5 kilometres (2.2 mi) long and takes 1.5 – 2 hours. This section is rated as moderate to difficult.
- 592-4 (SVA2): The fourth section, between Vernazza and Monterosso al Mare, is 3.8 kilometres (2.4 mi) long and takes no less than 2 hours. This section is rated as moderate to difficult.

The overall difference in height of the path is about 600 metres (2,000 ft), largely concentrated in the two longest stretches between Corniglia and Monterosso al Mare.

== Visitation and Trekking Card ==
It is one of the most popular hiking routes in the area, and the only trail in the national park requiring a fee. Along the route, there are checkpoints for the Cinque Terre Trekking Card, a hiking permit instituted in 2001 by the park authority. The card is aimed at allowing the use of the services provided by the Cinque Terre National Park Authority and constitutes a sort of self-financing. The proceeds of the Cinque Terre Cards are mainly used to upkeep and restore the territory, as well as to provide transport services within the territory. The card is purchasable online as well as at any of the welcome centers found in the park. The price is 7.50 EUR (2024) .

== Closures ==
Due to the unstable nature of the land in this area, frequent landslides result in regular trail closures. The park authorities recommend all visitors to check the status of trails prior to beginning any treks through the park.

== See also ==
- Cinque Terre
- Club Alpino Italiano
