= Manarola railway station =

Railway station in Italy

Manarola
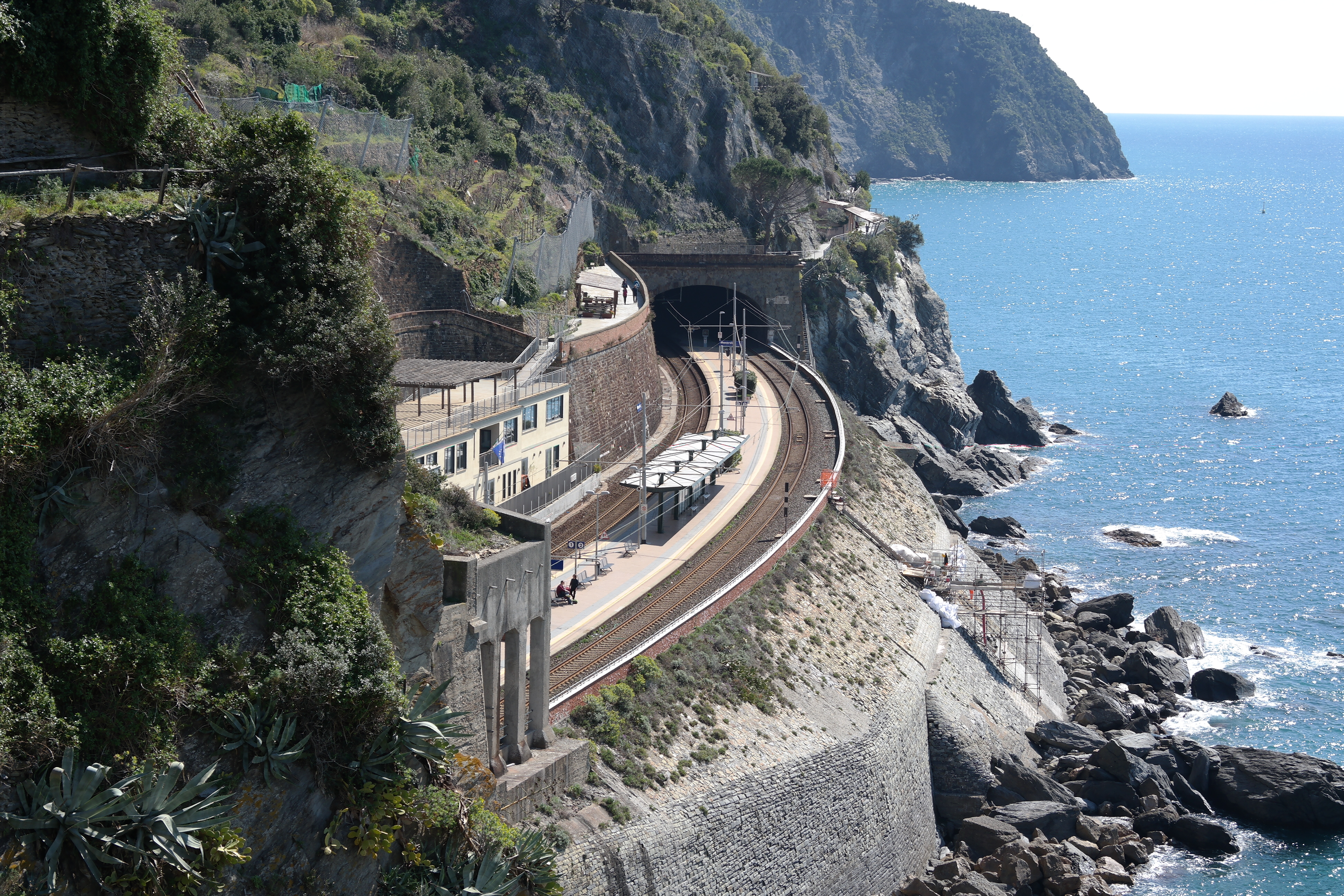
- View from above

General information
- Location: Via alla Stazione 1 Manarola, Riomaggiore, La Spezia, Liguria
- Coordinates: 44°06′18″N 9°43′45″E
- Operator: Rete Ferroviaria Italiana
- Line: Pisa–Genoa
- Platforms: 2
- Train operators: Trenitalia

Other information
- Classification: Silver

History
- Opened: 24 October 1874; 151 years ago
- Electrified: April 1926; 100 years ago; April 1947; 79 years ago
Location
- Location within Liguria Location within Northern Italy Location within Italy

Manarola railway station (Stazione di Manarola) is located on the Genoa–Pisa railway, Italy. It serves Manarola, which is one of the five towns of the Cinque Terre.

== History ==
The station was inaugurated on 24 October 1874, at the same time as the Sestri Levante–La Spezia line.

Freight operations were introduced in Manarola on 15 September 1913.

Double track between Manarola and Riomaggiore was opened in 1920 and extended on 14 November 1933 as far as the Gaggiola tunnel and between Riomaggiore and Corniglia on 31 May 1959. In 1959, a new passenger building and a loading area for goods were built, as well as a pedestrian tunnel to connect with the town.

On 1 December 1949, the station became an assuntoria (a station operated by an agent under contract). It is currently operated as an unstaffed halt.

In June and July 2011, the station was also served by the Treni del Mare ("trains of the sea") managed by the private company Arenaways, which became bankrupt shortly afterwards.

== Buildings and infrastructure ==
The station has two platforms; platform 1 is used mainly by trains to La Spezia and platform 2 by trains to Genoa.

A pedestrian tunnel gives access to the town centre. Another pedestrian path, built when the line was built, skirts the cliffs to Riomaggiore. It is a well-known tourist destination now called the Via dell'Amore ("the Way of Love"). It was closed for 12 years due to landslides and reopened in August 2024 after repairs.

== Services ==
The station, which RFI manages and classified in 2008 in the silver category, has:

- Ticket counter managed by Cinque Terre National Park.
- ticket machines
- toilets.

== Rail services ==
The station is served by Trenitalia regional services operated under a contract with the region of Liguria.
