= Riomaggiore railway station =

Railway station in Italy

Riomaggiore
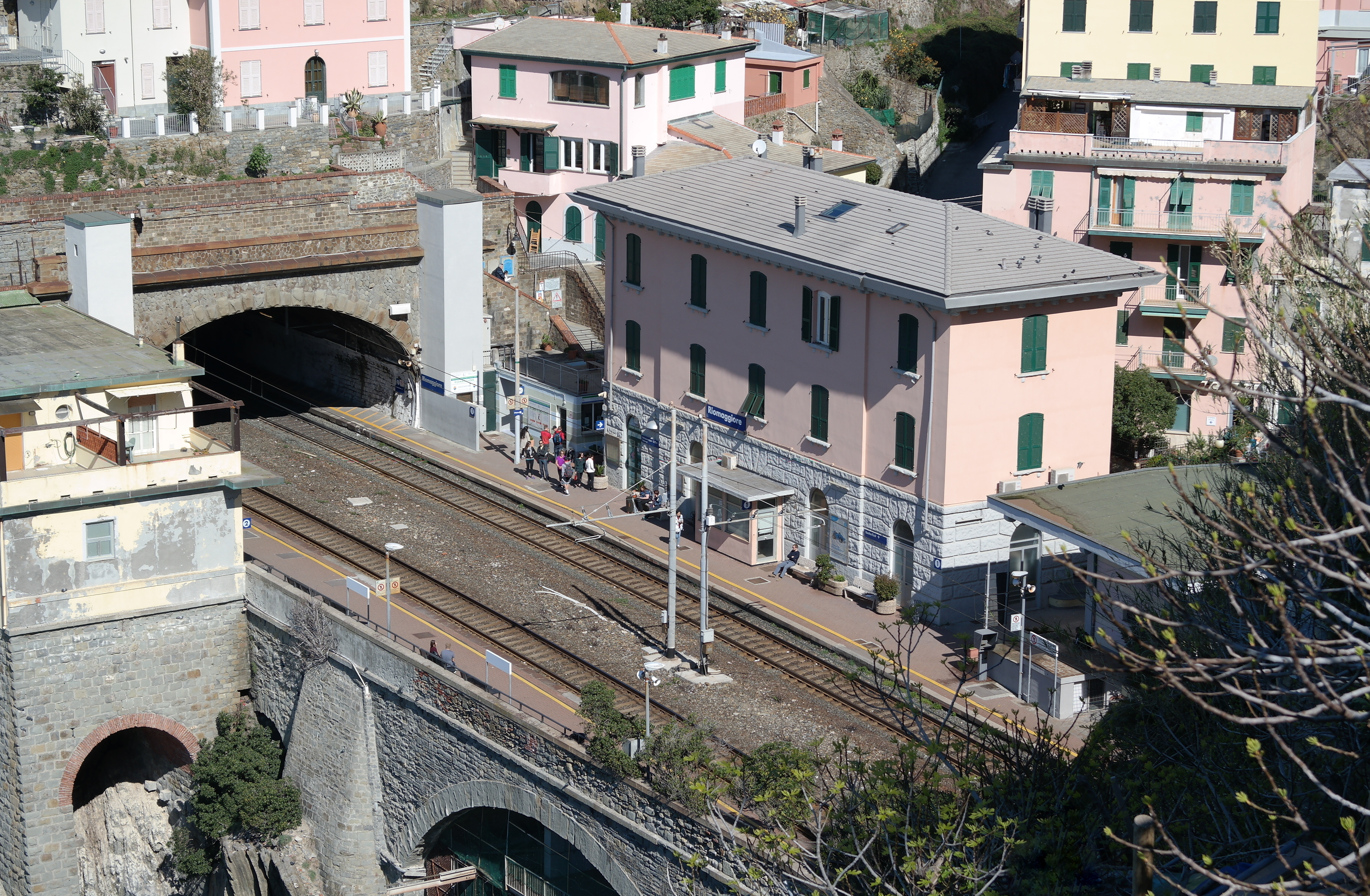

General information
- Location: Piazza Unita' d'Italia 6 Riomaggiore, La Spezia, Liguria
- Coordinates: 44°06′02″N 9°44′10″E
- Operator: Rete Ferroviaria Italiana
- Line: Pisa–Genoa
- Platforms: 2
- Train operators: Trenitalia

Other information
- Classification: Silver

History
- Opened: 24 October 1874; 151 years ago
- Electrified: April 1926; 100 years ago; April 1947; 79 years ago
Location
- Location within Liguria Location within Northern Italy Location within Italy

Riomaggiore railway station (Stazione di Riomaggiore) is located on the Genoa–Pisa railway, Italy. It serves Riomaggiore, which is one of the five towns of the Cinque Terre.

== History ==
The station was inaugurated on 24 October 1874, at the same time as the Sestri Levante–La Spezia line.

Double track between Manarola and Riomaggiore was opened in 1920 and extended on 14 November 1933 as far as the Gaggiola tunnel and between Riomaggiore and Corniglia on 31 May 1959. Associated work in the station area included the construction of the portal of the Batternara-Riofinale tunnel with a polycentric arch, which required changes to the adjacent areas, and the construction of a new 2-storey passenger building, a goods warehouse with a loading dock and the current underpass.

The station was reclassified as a halt on 14 December 2003.

In June and July 2011, the station was also served by the Treni del Mare ("trains of the sea") managed by the private company Arenaways, which became bankrupt shortly afterwards.

== Buildings and infrastructure ==
The station has two platforms; platform 1 is used mainly by trains to La Spezia and platform 2 by trains to Genoa.

An enclosed pedestrian path in the tunnel, running parallel to the track, gives access to the lower part of the historic centre at the mouth of the stream that runs through it. A second pedestrian path, which connects Riomaggiore with Manarola and was built in the open when the line was built, is a well-known tourist destination and is now called the Via dell'Amore ("the Way of Love""). It can be used for a fee (Supplemento tickets needs to be bought at one of the stations) after it was reopened in 2024, after being closed since 2012 due to a serious collapse of the rocks above.

== Services ==
The station, which RFI manages and classified in 2008 in the silver category, has:

- Ticket counter managed by Cinque Terre National Park.
- ticket machines
- toilets
- bar.

== Rail services ==
The station is served by Trenitalia regional services operated under a contract with the region of Liguria.
