= Bignami =

Bignami (pronounced [biɲˈɲaːmi]) is an Italian surname. Notable people with the surname include:

- Adolfo Bignami (1845–1906), Italian painter and engraver
- Amico Bignami (1862–1929), Italian physician and pathologist
- Enrico Bignami (1844–1921), Italian merchant, journalist and politician
- Galeazzo Bignami (born 1975), Italian politician
- Giovanni Bignami (1944–2017), Italian astrophysicist
- Osvaldo Bignami (1856–1936), Italian painter
- Otello Bignami (1914–1989), Italian violin maker
- Pietro Bignami (died 1830), Italian painter
- Vespasiano Bignami (1841–1929), Italian painter, cartoonist and writer

== See also ==
- Bignami (Milan Metro), a metro station in Milan, Italy
- Marchiafava–Bignami disease, a neurological disease
