= Bottazzi =

Bottazzi is an Italian surname. Notable people with the surname include:

- Antonio Bottazzi (died 1870), Italian painter
- Filippo Bottazzi (1867–1941), Italian biochemist
- Guillaume Bottazzi (born 1971), French visual artist
- Luca Bottazzi (born 1963), former Italian tennis player
- Maria Elena Bottazzi, American biologist

== See also ==
- Bottazzo
