= Giuseppe Sauli D'Igliano =

Italian painter

Giuseppe Sauli D'Igliano (June 6, 1853 in Turin – January 14, 1928) was an Italian painter, painting genre and landscape subjects.

His family originated in Genoa, but he was a resident in Turin. One of his teachers was Celestino Turletti. He exhibited in 1880 at Turin a canvas depicting: Offesa dal baffone. La lezione was exhibited in 1883 at Rome. Asperges me Domini was exhibited in 1886 at Livorno. Among other works: Storielle di gioventù and Funerali e danzewere displayed at the 1884 Exposition of Fine Arts at Turin. Expositions of Belle Arti, in 1884, in Turin.
