= Adolfo Bignami =

Italian painter and engraver (1845–1906)

Adolfo Bignami (1845–1906) was an Italian painter and engraver.

While born and trained in Bologna and Florence, he was linked to the artists in Turin and the Piedmont, including Antonio Fontanesi. He stopped exhibiting by 1877 due to an eye malady. Carlo Felice Biscarra and Luigi Rocca published a monthly journal with engraved works of art titled L'arte in Italia (1869–1873), which used Bignami, along with Telemaco Signorini and N. Costa, as engravers. One of his pupils was Celestino Turletti. He was known for his etchings.
