= Bottazzo =

Bottazzo is an Italian surname. Notable people with the surname include:

- Gian Franco Bottazzo (1946 - 2017), Italian physician
- Luigi Bottazzo (1845 - 1924), Italian organist and composer

== See also ==
- Bottazzi
