= Pietro Bignami =

Italian painter (died 1830)

Pietro Bignami (died 1830) was an Italian painter, active in the early 19th century in Lodi, Lombardy.

== Biography ==
He studied at the Academy of Fine Arts in Milan, a contemporary of Antonio Bottazzi, and painted battle scenes, landscapes and genre scenes. He painted a panorama of the Battle of Lodi Bridge, May 10, 1796 in which Napoleon himself participated in the assault of his troops. He also painted a Bernabò Visconti lost in a Forest. He also painted a monochrome depiction of musical instruments for the organ covers of the church of San Lorenzo.
