= Celestino Turletti =

Italian painter

Celestino Turletti (1845–1904) was an Italian painter and engraver.

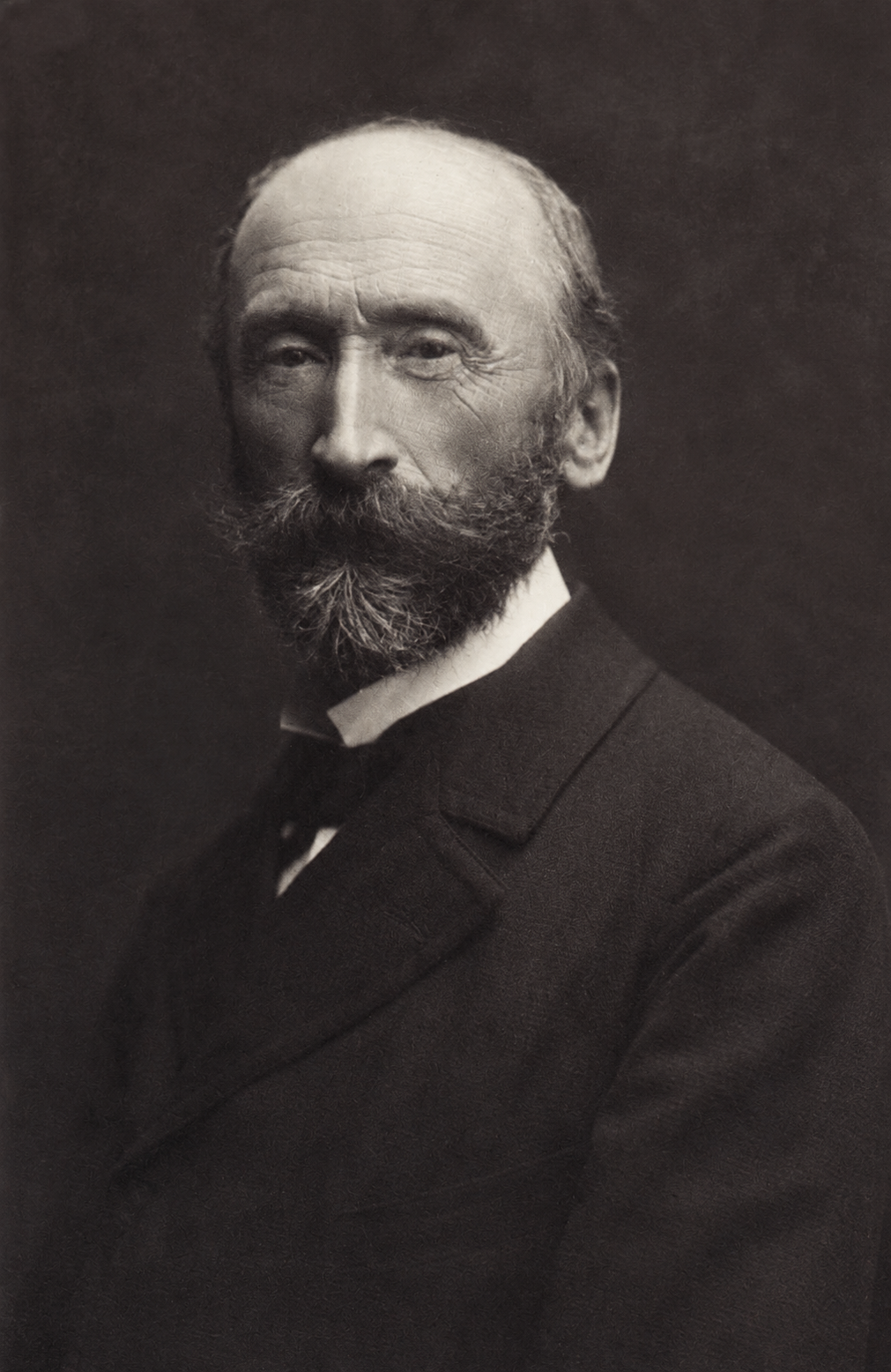
Celestino Turletti

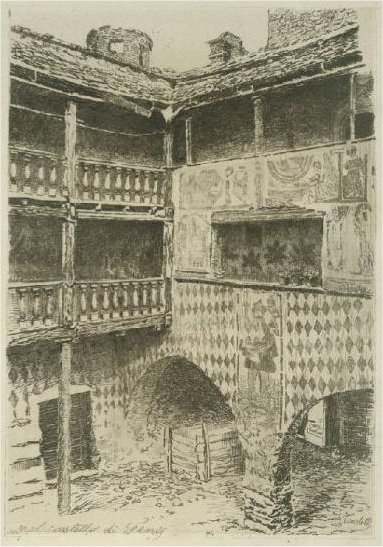
Engraving of Fénis Castle courtyard

He initially studied accounting, then attended the Accademia Albertina of Turin, studying under the painters Enrico Gamba and Andrea Gastaldi and engraving from A Lauro. He then moved to Florence to work with Adolfo Bignami.

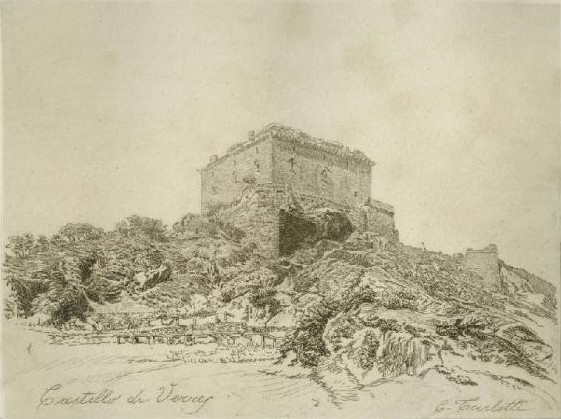
Engraving of Verrès Castle

His paintings often depicted Genre subjects often in humorous situations. In 1880 he exhibited in Turin: Monsignore assisterà alla rappresentazione; I martiri della grammatica; La vigilia dell'Epifania; Atelier del Burattinaio; Voglio emendarmi; Portrait in costume; and Piazza Santa Maria Formosa in Venice.

He became an expert in copying masterworks in engravings and with acquaforte, including: Catacomb; Death of Pope Boniface; and Il corriere del deserto.

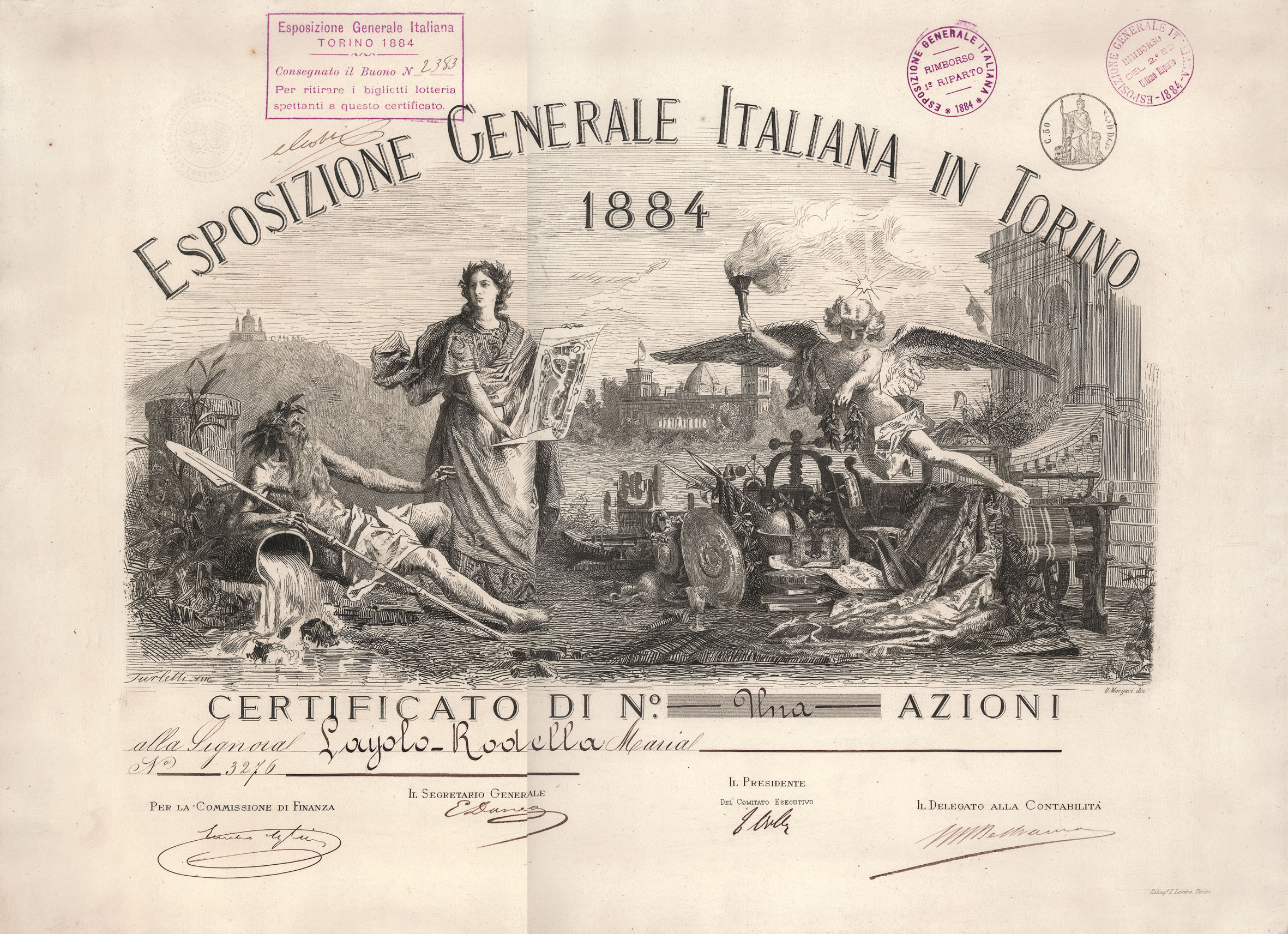
Share of the Esposizione Generale Italiana in Torino, graphical design by Celestino Turletti

In 1881 at Milan, he displayed a canvas of La questua delusa and L'arrivo; in 1883 at Rome exhibited: Andiamo pel mondo; Al tempio di Bacco; L' onomastico del confessore; and Varigolti. His Natale in convento was exhibited in 1886 at Milan. In 1887 at Venice, he sent the latter painting and various acqueforti. Among his paintings are: Il magnano of Turin and the elegant Illustrazione italiana, by the Publishing House of Treves.

Among his pupils was the alpine landscape painter Giuseppe Sauli D'Igliano.
