= Antonio Bottazzi =

Italian painter

Antonio Bottazzi (died 1870) was an Italian painter, active in the 19th century in Lombardy.

He was born in Cremona studied at the Academy of Fine Arts in Milan, a contemporary of Pietro Bignami of Lodi. He painted portraits, historical and sacred subjects. He painted a Glory of the Virgin for the Lodi Cathedral. He painted an altarpiece of the Assumption of the Virgin (1834) for the parish church of Roncadello. He painted a duel of Henry IV, Holy Roman Emperor, and the Gonfaloniere of Cremona, Giovanni Baldesio; the subject must have had subversive echoes at the time, given the occupation of Lombardy by Austrians. Antonio frescoed the four Evangelists for the parish church of Castelleone.
