= Telemaco Signorini =

Italian painter

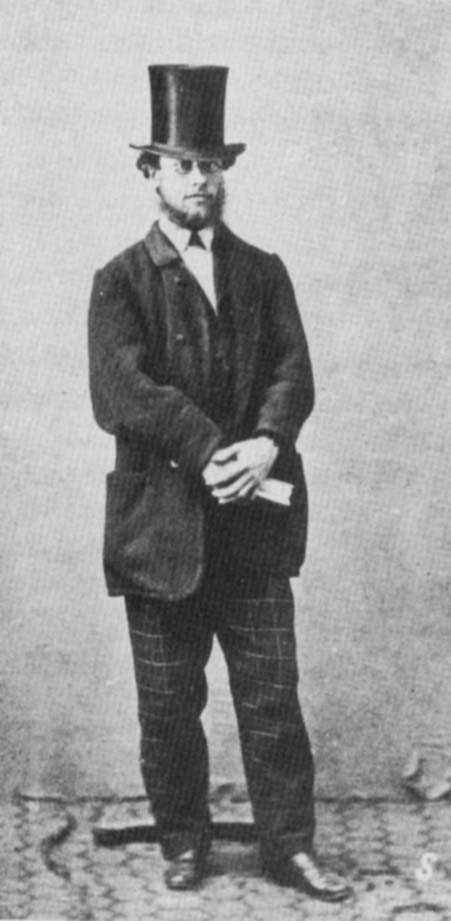
Telemaco Signorini (c.1875)

Telemaco Signorini (Italian: [teˈlɛːmako siɲɲoˈriːni]; August 18, 1835 – February 10, 1901) was an Italian artist who belonged to the group known as the Macchiaioli.

== Biography ==
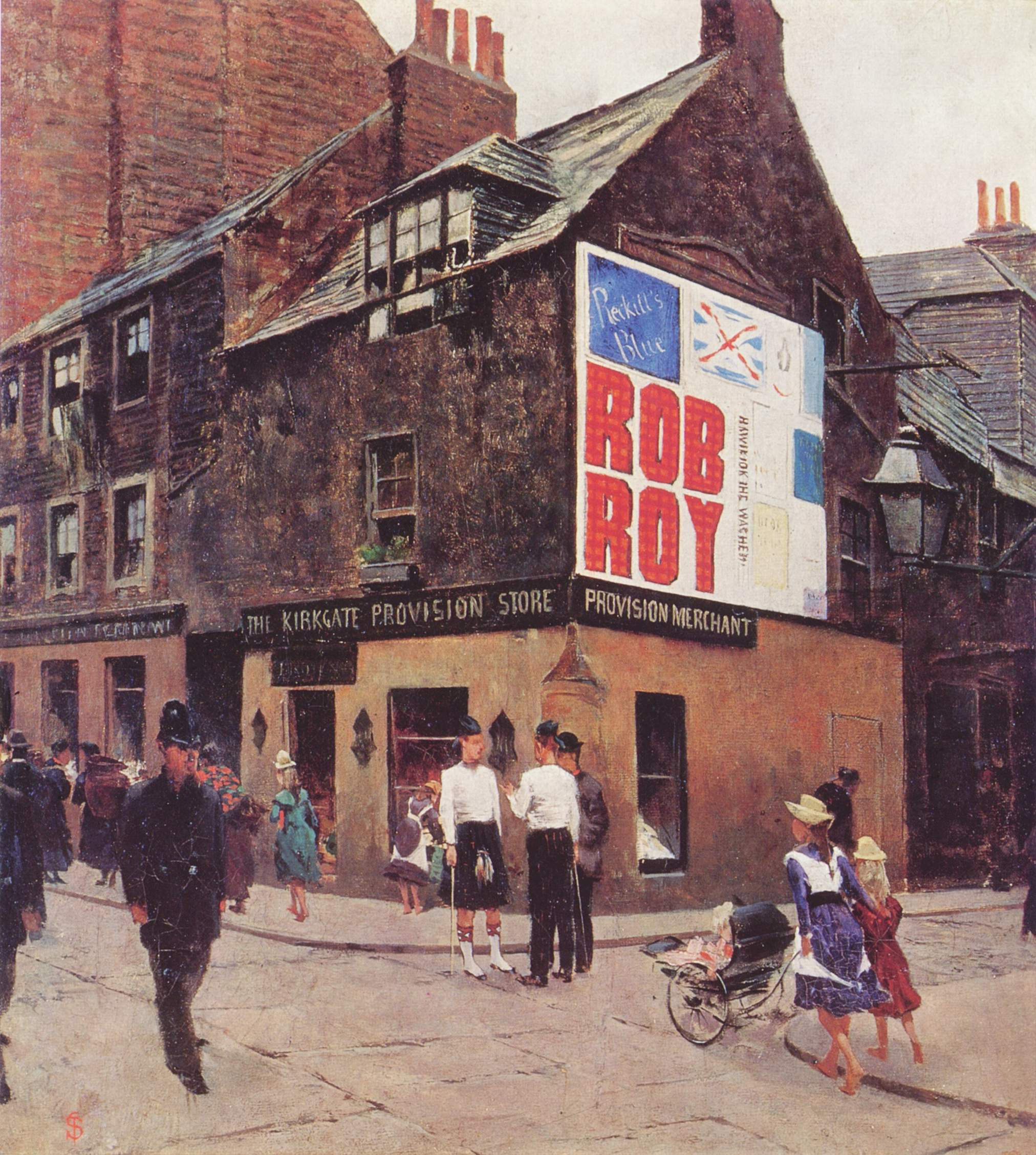
Leith (1881)

He was born in the Santa Croce quarter of Florence, and showed an early inclination toward the study of literature, but with the encouragement of his father, Giovanni Signorini (1808–1864), a court painter for the Grand Duke of Tuscany, he decided instead to study painting. In 1852 he enrolled at the Florentine Academy, and by 1854 he was painting landscapes en plein air. The following year he exhibited for the first time, showing paintings inspired by the works of Walter Scott and Machiavelli at the Società Promotrice delle Belle Arti.

In 1855, he began frequenting the Caffè Michelangiolo in Florence, where he met Giovanni Fattori, Silvestro Lega, Saverio Altamura and several other Tuscan artists who would soon be dubbed the Macchiaioli. The Macchiaioli, dissatisfied with the antiquated conventions taught by the Italian academies of art, started painting outdoors in order to capture natural light, shade, and color. They were forerunners of the Impressionists who, beginning in the 1860s, would pursue similar aims in France.

Signorini was a volunteer in the Second Italian War of Independence in 1859, and afterwards painted military scenes which he exhibited in 1860 and 1861. He made his first trip outside Italy in 1861 when he visited Paris, to which he would often return in the decades that followed. There he met Degas and a group of expatriate Italian artists in his orbit, including Giovanni Boldini, Giuseppe De Nittis, and Federico Zandomeneghi; unlike them, however, Signorini remained rooted in Italy. He became not only one of the leading painters of the Macchiaioli, but also their leading polemicist. Art historian Giuliano Matteucci has written: "If we acknowledge Fattori and Lega as the major creative figures of the macchiaioli, then Signorini must surely be recognized as their 'deus ex machina'", describing his role as "that of catalyst and energetic doctrinarian. In transforming attention away from history painting and the academic portrait towards a new poetical interpretation of natural landscape, the part of Signorini was of fundamental consequence to macchiaioli painting."

=== Exhibitions ===
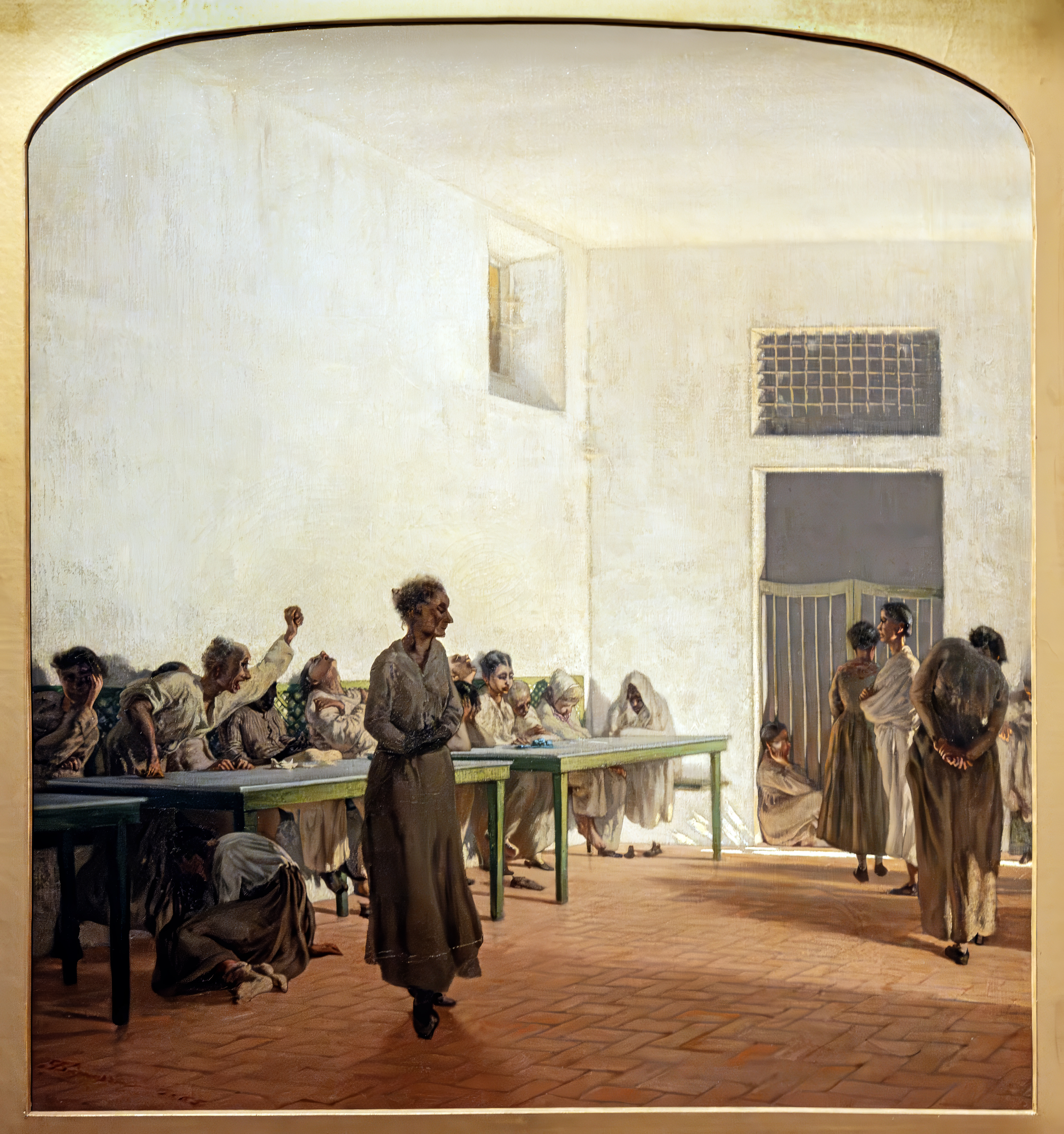
Ward of the Madwomen at S. Bonifazio (1865)

His presence at exhibitions was frequent and prolific. In 1860, at the Società Promotrice, he exhibited seven paintings, including I Toscani a Calcinato (The Calcined Tuscans). In 1861, he sent to Turin a somewhat polemical The ghetto of Venice. In 1865, he exhibited Le pazze (The Crazy Ones). In 1869 he made a series of etchings, and visited Paris for the second time. In 1870, at the Expositions of Parma and the Società Promotrice, he exhibited November which received a prize. In 1873, he traveled to Paris and London with De Nittis. Signorini exhibited Fuori porta Arianna a Ravenna (Outside the Arianna Gate, Ravenna) at the Exposition of Naples in 1877. His painting L'alzaia (The Towpath, completed in the 1860s) won awards at the Exposition of Vienna of 1874. In 1880, he exhibited in Turin the painting depicting The Ponte Vecchio. In 1881, he traveled to paint in Scotland.

At the 1882 Società Promotrice, he displayed The Ghetto of Florence and Riomaggiore. In 1883: Princes Street in Edinburgh; A Primi Castagnaio e Adolescenza, the latter also exhibited Turin in 1884, along with the canvas of the ghetto. At the 1885 Società Promotrice, he exhibited Evening Sun at Settignano; Morning Sun; Sunday at Riomaggiore; Santa Croce from the Via dei Malcontenti; Among the Olive Trees; Midday in the Country; To Settignano; Morning on the Banks of the Arno; Bigherinale of Settignano; In the Garden; Near Sunset; Piancastagnaio in Monte Amiata; August Sun; Baccano in Arcola; Autumn in the Fields; Via degli Speziali at the Mercato Vecchio; seven Vedute of the Isle of Elba, and many studies completed in Pietramala; Arcola in Val di Magra, and a portrait of "Mago Chiò", a legendary thief on Elba. At the Exposition of Livorno he had three canvases; at 1887 in Venice, six paintings.

Signorini was also a passionate art critic, and was published in art journals, including a series of 99 sonnets titled Le 99 discussioni artistiche di E. G. Moltenì. In 1882, he was nominated professor of the Florentine Academy but declined the appointment.

=== Works ===
Among his most notable paintings are The Ward of the Madwomen at S. Bonifazio in Florence (1865, Venice, Gallery of Modern Art in the Cà Pesaro); Penal Colony in Portoferraio (ca. 1890, Florence, Gallery of Modern Art in the Palazzo Pitti), which portrays the well-known brigand Carmine Crocco during his imprisonment; and Leith (1881, Florence, Gallery of Modern Art in Palazzo Pitti). The latter, a street scene observed on a trip to Scotland, is predominantly gray in tonality, but dominated by a brightly colored Rob Roy Whisky billboard on the side of a building. Art historian Norma Broude has written of Leith:

On the formal level, certainly, the Rob Roy sign arrests our attention and plays with our expectations here as audaciously as a collage element in an early twentieth-century cubist composition. What permitted and encouraged Signorini's experimentation in this remarkably precocious and unprecedented manner was unquestionably the experience of photography ... For with his vision conditioned by that experience, he could accept—as the eye of the camera accepts— what artists before him would normally have pruned or screened out of their interpretations of such a scene.

The influence of photography is often suggested by the asymmetrical compositions of Signorini's works, and his late etchings of street scenes reveal additional influences: those of Japanese art, and Whistler, in their simplifications of shape, atmospheric effects, and flattened treatment of space.

In 1888 he began teaching at the Instituto Superiore di Belle Arti in Florence. He died in that city on February 10, 1901.

== Other selected paintings ==
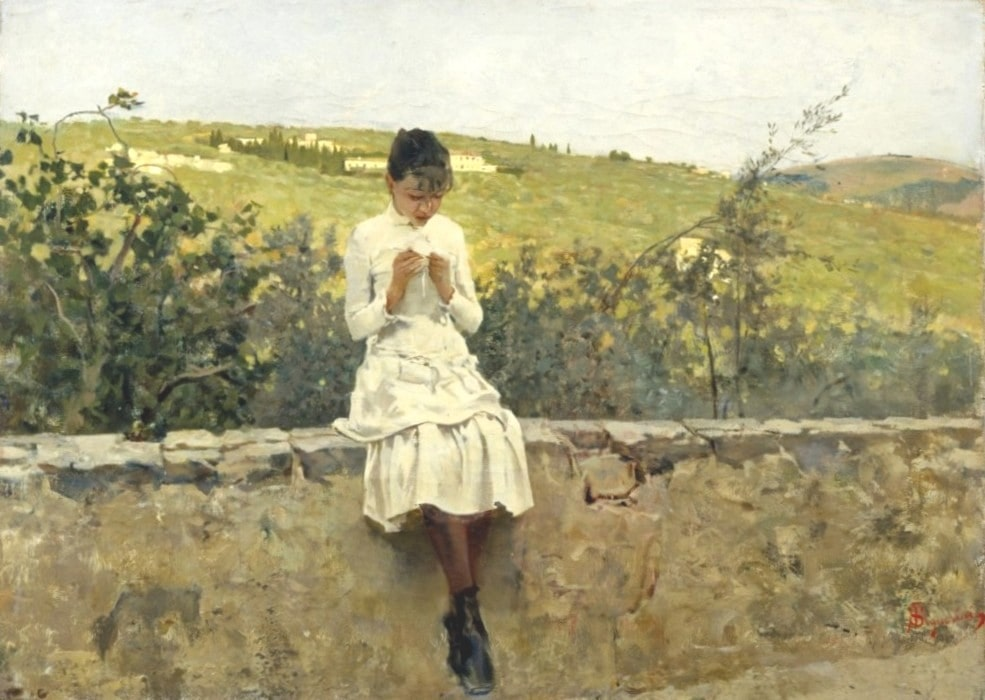
Hills in Settignano

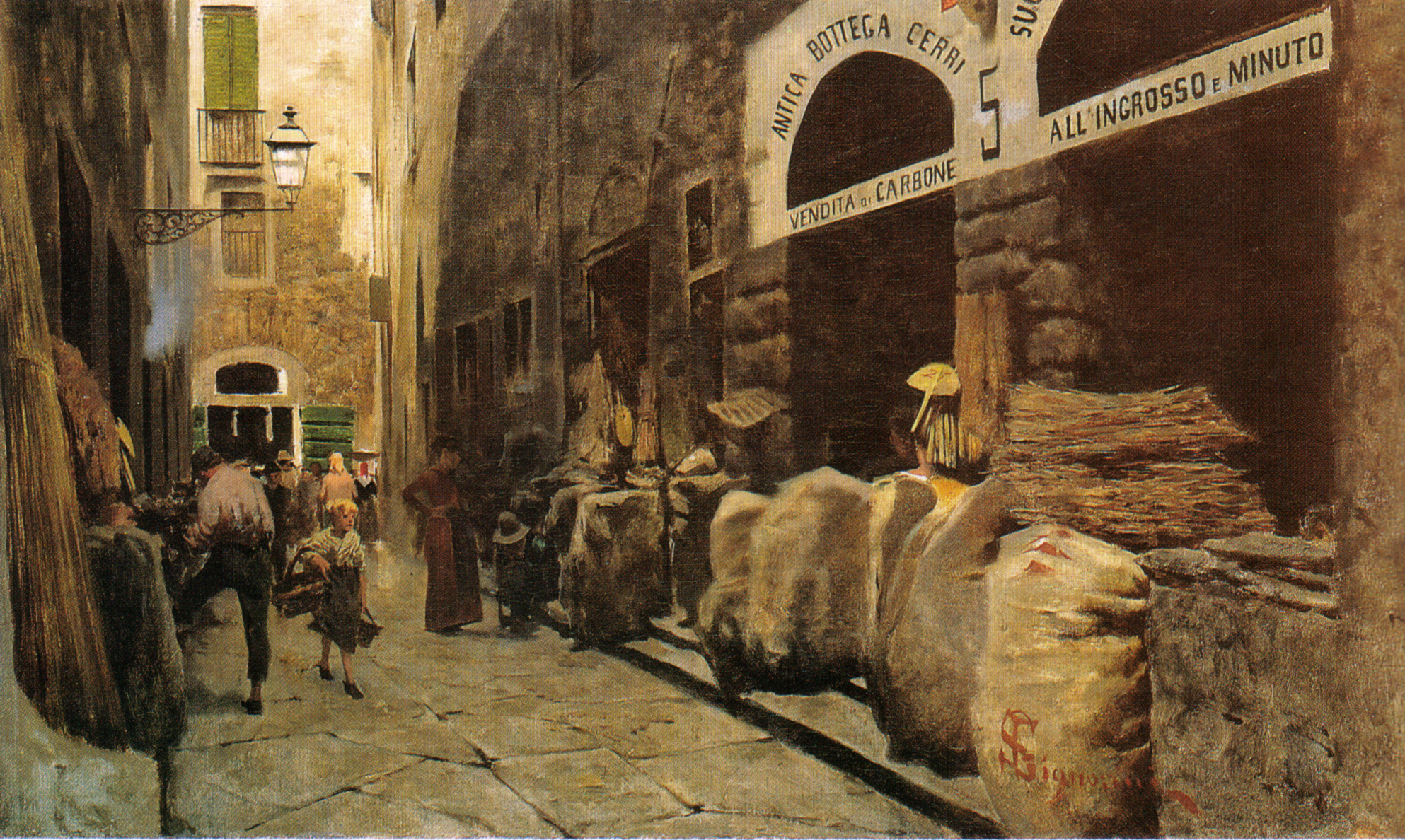
La Via del fuoco, 1881

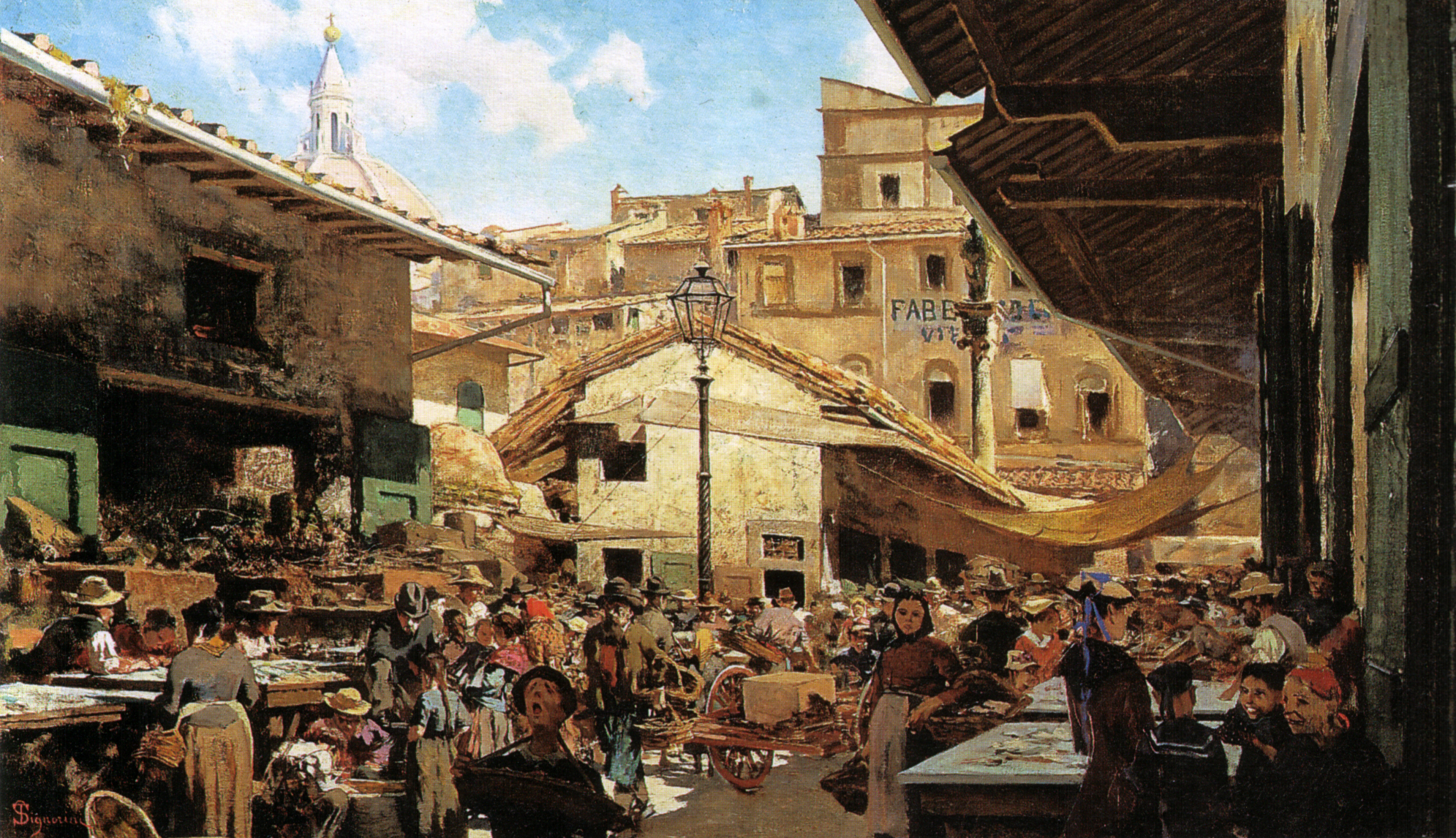
Mercato Vecchio in Florence, 1882–83

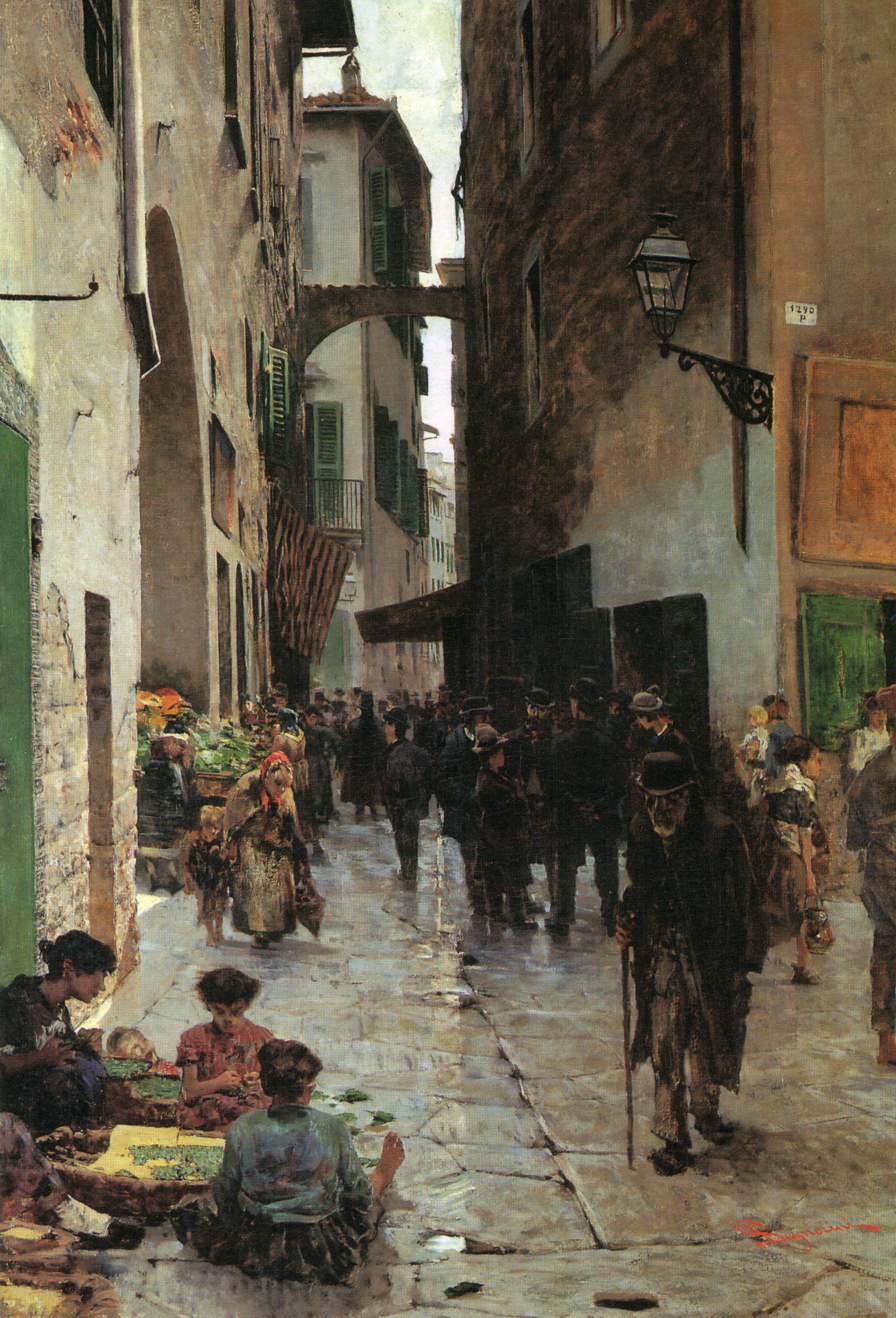
Ghetto of Florence, 1882

Penal Colony in Portoferraio, 1890

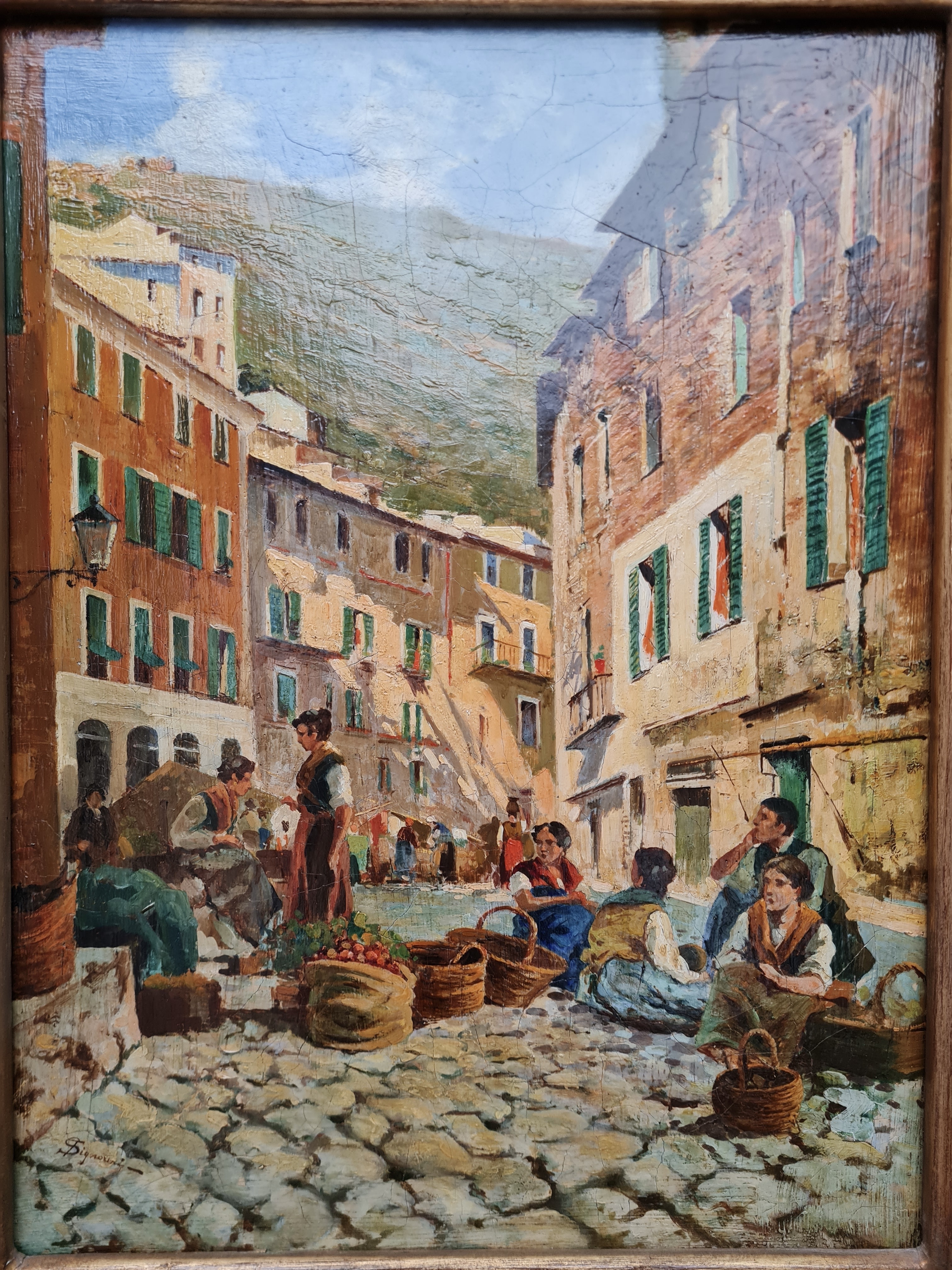
A riposo a Riomaggiore, 1892-94
