= Via dell'Amore =

Pedestrian path in Liguria, Italy

Coordinates: 44°06′06″N 9°44′00″E

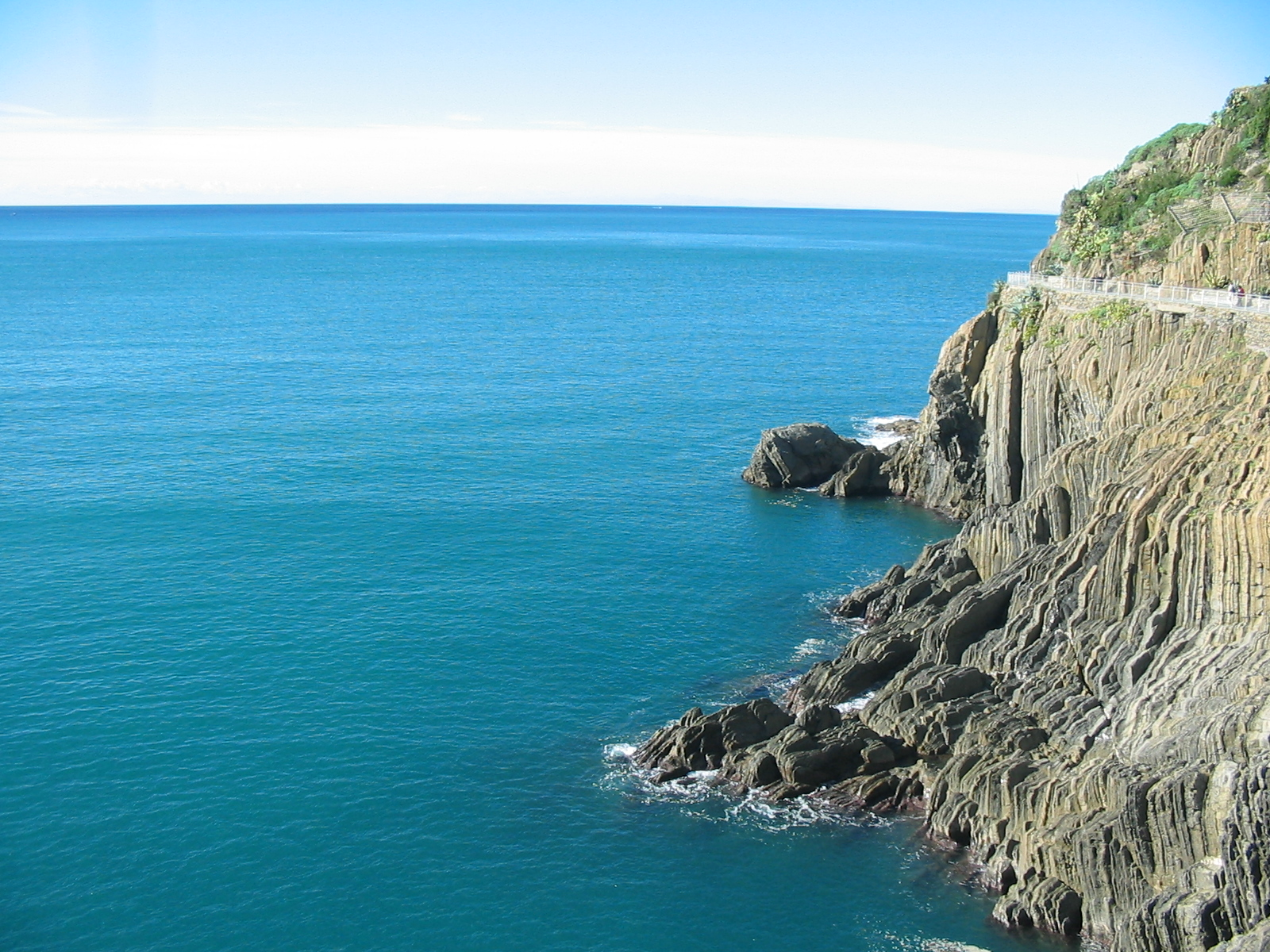
Panoramic view in Riomaggiore

La via dell'Amore or The Way of Love is a pedestrian path overlooking the sea, with a length of just over one kilometer, linking the villages of Riomaggiore and Manarola, Cinque Terre, in Liguria, Italy. It is one of four sections of the Sentiero Azzurro, "the Blue Path", the most popular hiking trail in the Cinque Terre National Park.

The trail's name was inspired by the fact that it provided an easy and private meeting place for young lovers who lived in the two small towns in the mountainous terrain.

On September 24, 2012, a rockslide injured four tourists and caused the trail to be shut down for repairs. As of April 2015, only 200 meters of the trail had been reopened. According to press reports in late 2019, extensive work is due to begin on the repair of the trail. It required major engineering work, with an estimated cost of over 12 million euro.

The complete trail finally reopened in July, 2024 for residents and tourists.

The path is one of the most important tourist attractions in the area and is an integral part of the Cinque Terre National Park, a World Heritage Site.

== Gallery ==
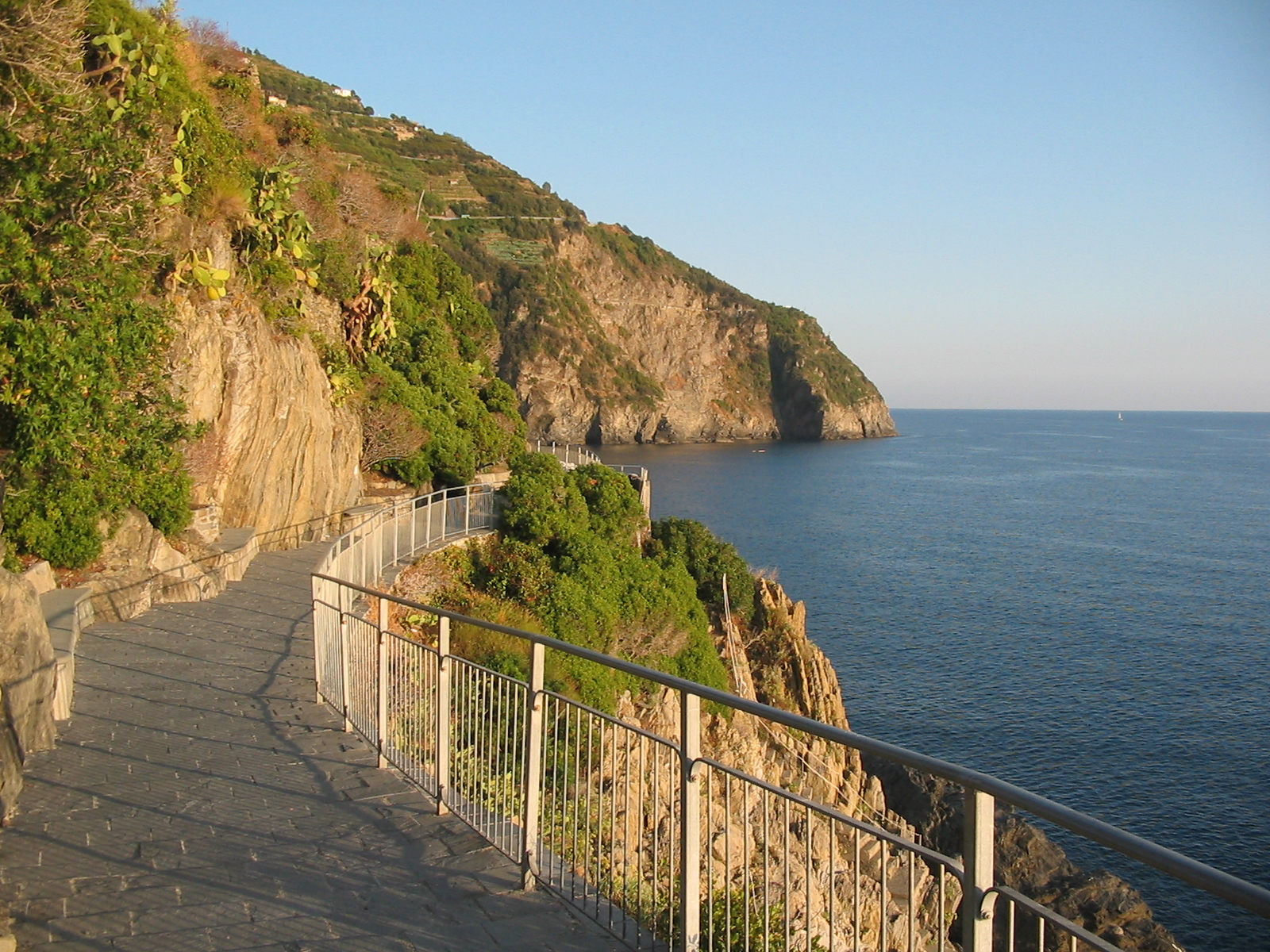
