= San Lorenzo, Lodi =

Church in Lombardy, Italy

Coordinates: 45.3124°N 9.5014°E

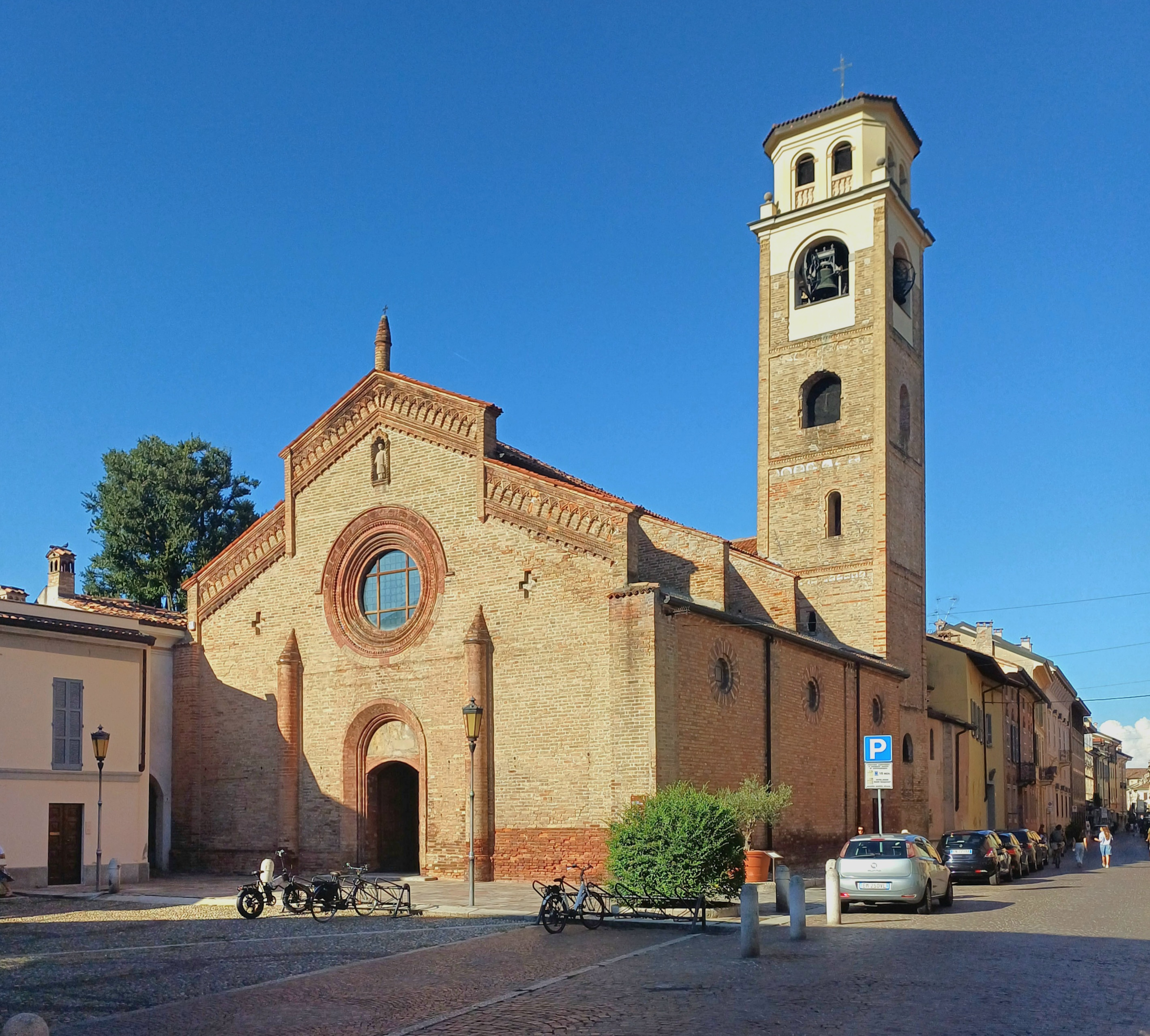
Façade of the church

San Lorenzo is a Romanesque-style, Roman Catholic church located in Lodi, region of Lombardy, Italy.

Construction of the church began by 1159. The brick facade has two pilasters and a central round window (oculus), above which is an aedicule with a statue of St Lawrence. The cornice has a false arcade. The apse has 16th-century stucco decorations by Abbondio da Ascona; the hemicycle of the apse has a fresco of a Resurrected Christ by Callisto Piazza.
