= Cinque Terre National Park =

Italian national park

- Parco Nazionale delle Cinque Terre
- IUCN category II (national park)
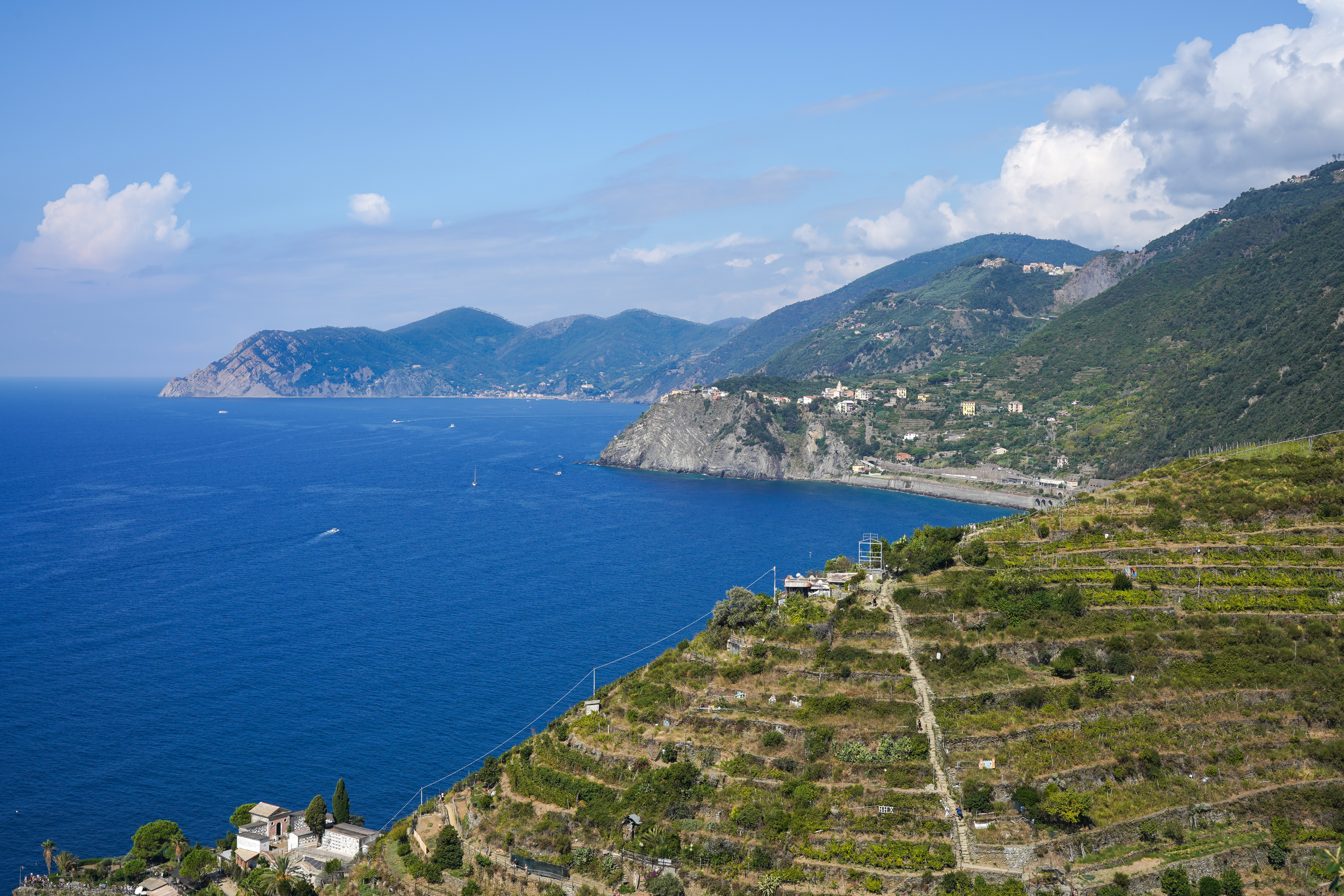
- NW half of the Park, Manarola to Punta Mesco

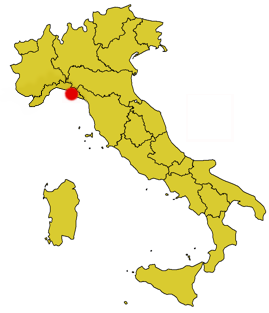
- Location of the park
- Location: Liguria
- Nearest city: La Spezia
- Coordinates: 44°06′N 09°45′E
- Area: 38.60 km^{2} (14.90 sq mi)
- Established: 1999
- Governing body: Ministero dell'Ambiente
- World Heritage site: 1997

Cinque Terre National Park (Italian: Parco Nazionale delle Cinque Terre) is a protected area inducted as an Italian national park in 1999. Located in the province of La Spezia, Liguria, northern Italy, it is the smallest national park in Italy at 4,300 acres, but also the densest with 5,000 permanent inhabitants among the five towns. In addition to the territory of the towns of Cinque Terre (Riomaggiore, Manarola, Corniglia, Vernazza and Monterosso al Mare), the Cinque Terre National Park encompasses parts of the communes of Levanto (Punta Mesco) and La Spezia (Campiglia Sunsets). Cinque Terre was included as a UNESCO World Heritage Site in 1999.

Linked by a series of trails and well-known for its heritage of terracing, the five cliff-side towns on the Ligurian Coast exemplify human-environment interactions through landscape modification. The National Park helps maintain Cinque Terre's natural and cultural landscape, promote sustainable tourism for Cinque Terre's economic development, and preserve the identity of Cinque Terre's places and products.

== Description ==
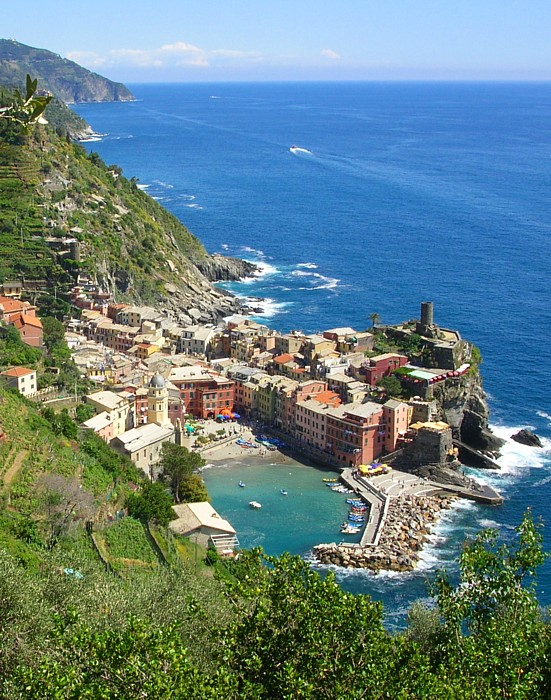
View Of Vernazza

The Cinque Terre National Park was established on 6 October 1999 in recognition of the territory's considerable scenic, agricultural, historical and cultural value. Two years before, the area was added to the list of World Heritage Sites. The five medieval towns along the Ligurian Coast provide scenic views of rugged terrain reeled in with terraced stone walls, where the mountains of 'Appennino Ligure come straight to the sea. The form and disposition of the towns as they embrace topography embedded in the cliffs are a testament to the long history of settlement and the terraced cultivated lands to the agricultural heritage of the area. As the first Italian park created to safeguard a landscape that has been mostly built by humans, the Cinque Terre National Park and Protected Marine Area aim to protect cultural heritage of “the park of Man”.

The site's location and topography is a vital part of the identity of Cinque Terre, whose extreme typological restraints and access to the coast inherently provide for a delicate relationship between man and the natural environment. That relationship has led to a dual existence, focused on both land and sea.

Known for its natural environment and coastal hiking trails, Cinque Terre is a tourist destination that draws people from all over the world, the numbers rising to 3.5- 5 million in the month of August alone. Although essential, the goal of World Heritage areas like Cinque Terre National Park is to maintain the tourist ecosystem in a functional state by preserving the fine balance between tourism and agriculture.

=== Flora ===
Even though the Mediterranean flora have obvious features, there are many microclimates often different from each other which created a huge variety of landscapes. There are pine, Aleppo pine, corks and chestnut. Rock and coastal environments produce numerous Mediterranean species such as samphire and sea cineraria. Flora is visible everywhere even as shrub rosemary, thyme, helichrysum and lavender. Also present are several species of trees and succulents clearly visible from many trails.

=== Fauna ===
The environment is conducive to the development of life and habitat of several animal species. Among the birds are the gull, the peregrine falcon and the raven. Among the mammals are the dormouse, weasel, mole, badger, marten, fox and wild boar (whose presence is resented for damage to crops). The reptiles that thrive in the rock are the common wall lizard, the lizard and various snakes such as the rat snake, the grass snake of Aesculapius and the viper; around streams live amphibians like frogs and salamanders.

=== Land degradation ===
One of greatest threats to the Cinque Terre region and one the National Park works to address, is land degradation. Today, a large percentage of cultural heritage sites are classified by governmental authorities as exposed to landslide risk. In Italy in particular, whose terrain is 75% mountainous or hilly, 13/36 (36%) of heritage sites are affected by slope instability problems, including the Cinque Terre region.

The landslide activity of a region can be attributed to many factors. According to GNDCI, most current landslides in the Apennines are recently dormant, reactivated with climate change. While this explanation links the problem more to environmental and geological factors, mankind also plays a large role in the problem. Relevantly to Cinque Terre, changes in land use and agricultural practices have drastic effects on landslides and their outcomes. In a comparison of images of Cinque Terre land terracing in 1958 and 2000, there appears a clear increase in soil erosion and degradation of vineyard terraces that is consistent with agriculture abandonment in the 1960s as the main focus of the area shifted to tourism and away from the careful "landscape engineering" of previous centuries. According to city officials, in 1951, about 3,500 acres of Cinque Terre land were cultivated, compared to 275 today.

As land was already in a state of degradation in 2011, terrace abandonment is thought to be a contributing factor to the flash flood disaster of 25 October 2011. After 4 hours of uncharacteristic 56 cm (22 in) of rain and subsequent flash floods, the towns of Monterosso al Mare and Vernazza were virtually destroyed. The other three cities, due to natural topography and effective draining systems, went mostly undamaged.

For these reasons, one of the foremost agendas of the National Park, is the maintenance and revitalization of the slopes. The value in promoting terracing is two-fold, as it not only addresses landslide control but also recognizes the history and traditions of the villages by bringing back the traditional Cinque Terre vineyards. The "Uncultivated Lands" LIFE Project, co-founded in 2001 by the European Community and the Cinque Terre National Park, seeks to recover the unused terraces and to return them to their previous success for production of Albarola and Vermentino vineyards.. One such hill, Corniolo, is featured as not only an educational tool for researchers interested in safe and effective cultivating practices, but also as a "laboratory" to bring back the famed grapes that, in combination, shaped Cinque Terre's reputation as wine producers in the Middle Ages. A sub-project, in cooperation with Agricultura Cinque Terre seeks to do just that, by reintroducing some of the traditional ancient grapes of the region. In addition, the success of "Uncultivated Lands" has been an invaluable model for other areas, such as the UNESCO site of Ifugao, Philippines, who are interested in perfecting and re-establishing thousand-year old cultivation practices within their own communities.

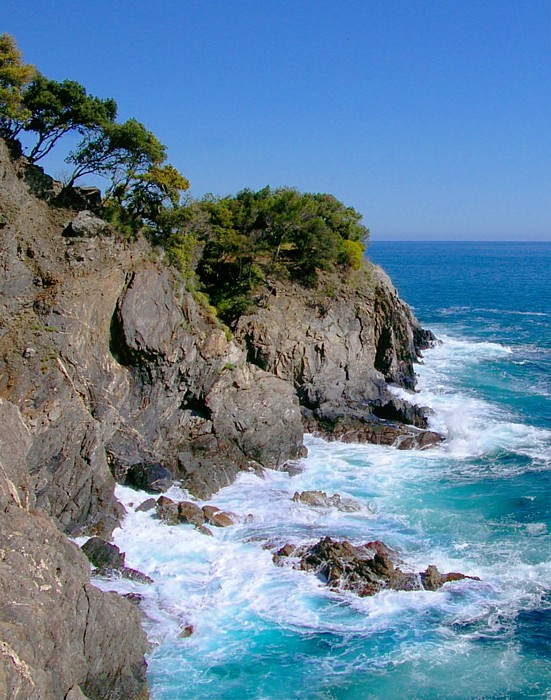
Characteristic coastal stretch of Cinque Terre

== UNESCO World Heritage Site ==
At UNESCO’s meeting on 5 December 1997 the Cinque Terre, Portovenere and the islands of Palmaria, Tino and Tinetto, were added to its World Heritage List under the heading of a cultural landscape. An important site both environmentally and culturally, it was described as “the harmonious interaction between people and nature to produce a landscape of exceptional beauty". The addition of Cinque Terre to the list also addressed it as a world- known tourist destination. The site was enrolled under a number of criteria, including:

1. shows an important interchange of human values, over a period of time or within a cultural area of the world, in the context of developments in architecture or technology, monumental arts or in the planning or urban (landscape) in the design of landscape (ii);
2. is a remarkable example of a type of a complex of buildings or architectural or technological or landscape which illustrates a significant moment in human history (iv);
3. is a remarkable example of a traditional human settlement or land use that is typical of a culture (cultures), especially if they become vulnerable due to the impact of irreversible change (v).

== Ecotourism ==
The past three decades have seen a significant growth in tourism, in turn providing new economic opportunities for places like Cinque Terre. Ecotourism is a branch of the industry aiming at the enjoyment of and drawing appreciation to the natural landscape in an environmentally-conscious manner that conserves the ecosystem while improving the well-being of local communities. For tourists, there is often an expectation of a pristine untouched environment, and an interest in the local population as a part of that landscape. In Cinque Terre, the greatest draw for tourists are the hiking trails and scenery among the local traditional settlements. This socio-cultural element is essential as it highlights the heritage and culture of the picturesque Italian villages.

Cinque Terre's popularity can be contributed to the establishment of the park in 1999 and the addition to the UNESCO World Heritage Site, both of which embrace ecotourism and the need for sustainability. A result of extensive efforts towards infrastructure, improvement of accessibility and sustainable practices, the park has developed the site, and increased its appeal on the global scale. While conservation policy can sometimes subordinate the environment and local interests in the favor of promoting tourism, that is not the case in Cinque Terre, where there is such large personal investment from the local population. In fact, locals and park representatives work in tandem to understand and adapt to changing tourist needs while mitigating negative environmental consequences.

In order to maintain responsible and sustainable tourism within a community, certain criteria must be met. Foremost, the tourism must be culturally appropriate. As a World Heritage Site, Cinque Terre embraces its traditions and culture and expands the tourist experience beyond a hike through the hills. The National Park makes a connection to the place with authentic customs, foods and wines. Second, is the importance of land tenure and connection to the land, which Cinque Terre addresses with lifestyles that depend on both land and water. It is this strong connection to the environment that continues to bring tourists to these towns imbedded perfectly in the coastal hills. Finally, what gives Cinque Terre so much potential for sustainable tourism are the local benefits that stretch beyond economics.

== Management and development ==
=== Trail management ===
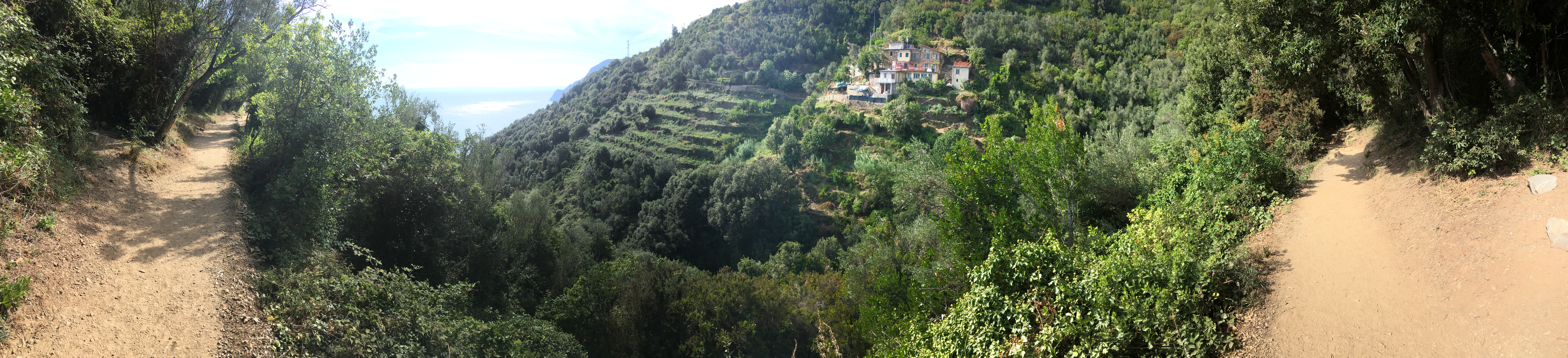
The Blue Path, the most popular hiking trail in the park, between Vernazza and Monterosso al Mare

The presence of trails that are safe and accessible while minimizing soil erosion is vital for a National Park, particularly one whose typology is as extreme as Cinque Terre. A direct result of the heavy crowds during the summer months, Cinque Terre trails, spanning almost 19 km (12 mi) are in constant need of supervision, as both soil degradation and human safety are real concerns. The absence of adequate control can have effects ranging in severity from vegetation loss to major soil erosion. Environmentally sustainable trail management relies on proper oversight that can include an inventory and evaluation of existing trails and grades, set standards for accessibility and closures when weather or other natural conditions deem appropriate. In evaluating trails, it is important to assess intended recreational uses: the extent to which particular paths will be used and the difficulty of said trails. While the best trails are those that are designed, like many other parks, Cinque Terre relies more on visitor created paths or those that are originally the result of local necessity. For instance, the Via dell’Amore is a footpath that was originally built by railroad workers in 1926–1928 for convenience between stations. In addition, to counteract the steep topography of the hills, the park relies on hillside trail construction, stone retaining walls and steps to maintain sustainable footpaths.

=== Development ===
In moving forward to improve and sustainably manage the park, an evaluation of tourist demands and projects that respond to those needs are essential. In collaboration with the Italian government, UNESCO has launched a pilot project to implement Management Plans that will provide guidelines for the sites listed in the World Heritage List before 2002, hoping to eventually expand the project to all other National Heritage sites. Specifically for Cinque Terre, the park foresees as its goals the management of tourist flow, preservation of land, an increase of the market for local products and, subsequently, an expansion of the local economy. The analysis considers "attributes" such as the landscape, accessibility, services, type of cookery and cost, and tourist perceptions of these factors. In regards to the landscape attribute, a negative connotation was connected to "mixed cultivation", suggesting that the main draw for tourists is the appreciation of the natural landscape, and less so the tradition that is tied to terraced vineyards.

Unfortunately, tourism in the Mediterranean is seasonal, and heavy surges of visitors in the summer months overload the natural resources over the course of a very short time and crowd-control and limiting trail hours which would minimize the impact of heavy foot traffic are options that are still being perfected. In the off-season, some businesses are virtually abandoned, creating an economic imbalance that is difficult to adjust to. In response, the National Park has tried to draw tourist attention to other aspects of the towns. While there is great success of the "Cinque Terre Card" that allows access to the trails, potential additions of the "Education Card" (granting access to museums and laboratory activities) and the "Health Card" (which promotes natural alternative medicine such as naturopathy and plantar reflexology) are met with less enthusiasm. In either case, ecotourism development is desirable in leading the industry in a more sustainable direction.

=== The MQA Project ===
The Marchio di Qualità Ambientale (Environmental Quality Brand) is a project whose aim is to minimize the impact of man on the environment by promoting sustainable tourism. The initiative is aimed at tourist-sector businesses on a voluntary basis, the hope being that services that have the potential to safeguard the environment do so through business practices. It is a partnership between the National Park and local business owners, establishing a relationship between socio-economic development interest and environmental protection.

== Protected Marine Area ==
The Protected Marine Area was founded in 1997 and preludes the National Park as an effort to protect and maintain proper usage of the sea off the coast of Cinque Terre. It is subdivided into 3 zones, a Strict Nature Reserve, where boaters are prohibited, the General Nature Reserve, which allows access to motor boats, registered retail fishermen and guided scuba diving tours and the last and least stringent Partial Nature Reserve that allows monitored recreational fishing.

=== Pelagos Sanctuary ===
This part of the Ligurian Sea is included in the Pelagos Sanctuary for Mediterranean marine mammals, an international protected area that includes territories of France, Monaco and Italy. Founded in 2002, The Pelagos Sanctuary focuses on the protection of Mediterranean cetaceans under threat from human involvement. In Italy, past practices included deep-net fishing and pollution from cruise ships that dock in areas like Cinque Terre, endangering the habitats of dolphins and other cetaceans that live in its waters. Goals are aimed at the protection of Pelagos cetaceans and their habitats and food ecosystems as well as the general biodiversity of the Mediterranean coast.

The coast along the Cinque Terre is characterized by high cliffs, caves, bays, tiny beaches and cleft rocks. Marine life in the stretch of the coast which extends from Punta Mesco at Monterosso to Capo Montenegro at Riomaggiore is rich and varied. The steep faces of the cliffs under water and the shallows and isolated rocks are populated by various kinds of gorgonia (sea fans), such as the colorful Leptogorgia sarmentosa and the white Eunicella verrucosa, a rare species in the Mediterranean, but fairly common along this part of the coast. The Posidonia oceanica, a plant that creates very important grass-like colonies, grows here and provides a safe habitat for the reproduction of many organisms. The steep rock faces of Punta Mesco and Capo Montenegro have the richest forms of marine life including rare species: the Eunicella verrucosa mentioned above, the rare Gerardia savaglia, or black coral. At a depth of only about 15–20 metres (50–70 ft) at Punta Mesco, unlike the rest of the Mediterranean, it is possible to discover the fans of the Paramuricea clavata or red gorgonia.

== Sanctuaries ==
On the Cinque Terre path network, there is a route that serves five Marian sanctuaries attached to each village. They are also accessible by road, except for the one in Montenero. The sanctuary of Corniglia, 390 metres (1,280 ft) high, dates from the 20th century and was built on the site of a chapel dating from 1584. The other buildings all date from the Middle Ages, including that of Nostra Signora de Soviore, the oldest Ligurian sanctuary, noted in a document of 1225.

== Administration ==
The Cinque Terre are composed of five villages: from west to east:

- Monterosso al Mare (comune)
- Vernazza (comune)
- Corniglia (frazione of Vernazza)
- Manarola (frazione of Riomaggiore)
- Riomaggiore (comune)

Other municipalities whose territory is part of the Cinque Terre National Park:

- Levanto
- La Spezia

== See also ==
- Ligurian Sea
- Province of La Spezia
- National parks of Italy
