= Manarola =

Settlement in Riomaggiore, Liguria, Italy

Manarola Manaea
- Frazione
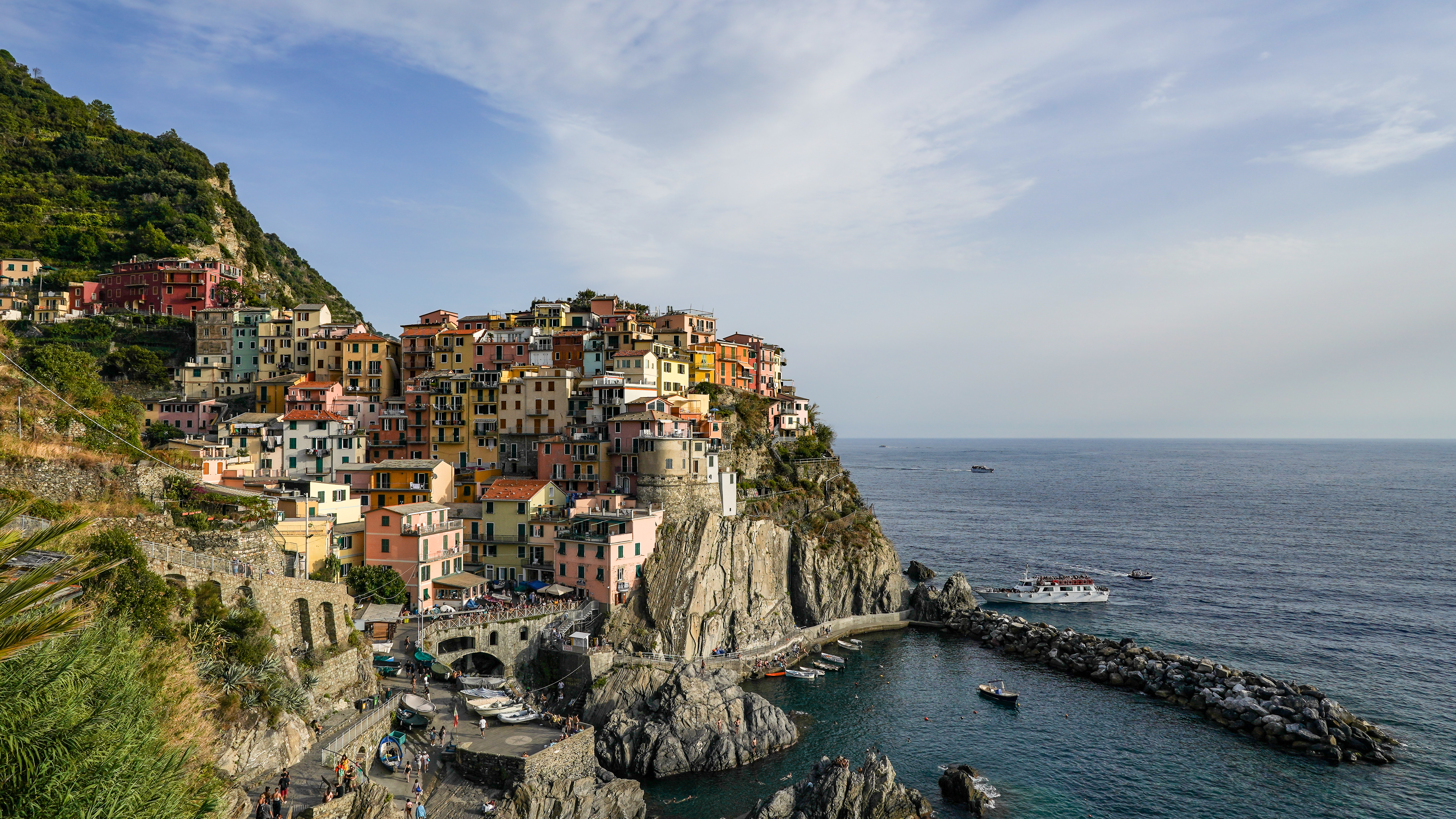
- View of Manarola

- Location of Manarola in Italy
- Coordinates: 44°06′00″N 9°45′00″E
- Country: Italy
- Region: Liguria
- Province: La Spezia (SP)
- Comune: Riomaggiore

Area
  - Total: 2 km^{2} (0.77 sq mi)
- Elevation: 3 m (9.8 ft)

Population
  - Total: 353
  - Density: 180/km^{2} (460/sq mi)
- Demonym: Manarolesi
- Time zone: UTC+1 (CET)
  - Summer (DST): UTC+2 (CEST)
- Postal code: 19017
- Dialing code: 0187
- Patron saint: Saint Lawrence
- Saint day: 10 August

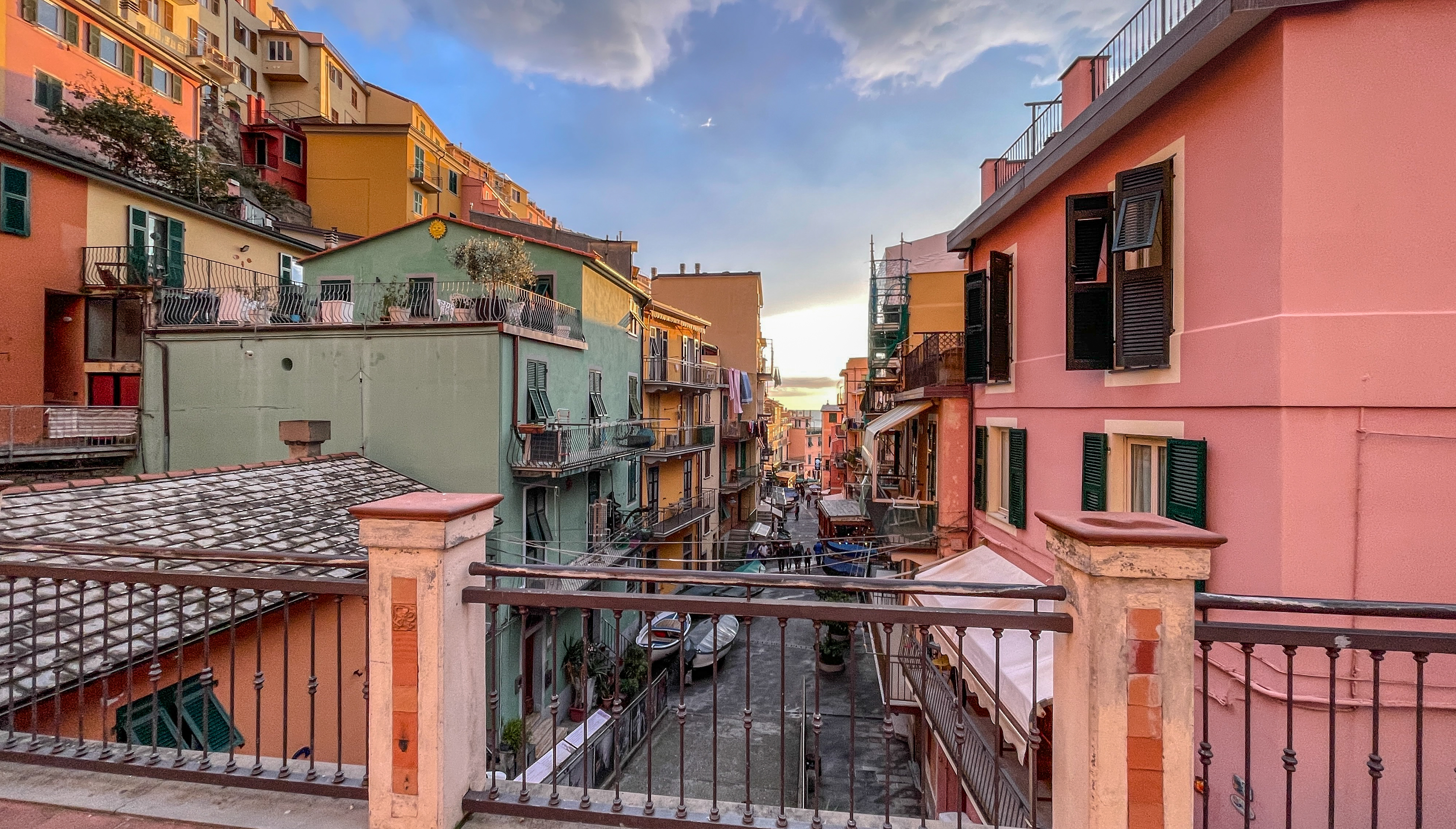
Colorful street in Manarola, Cinque Terre

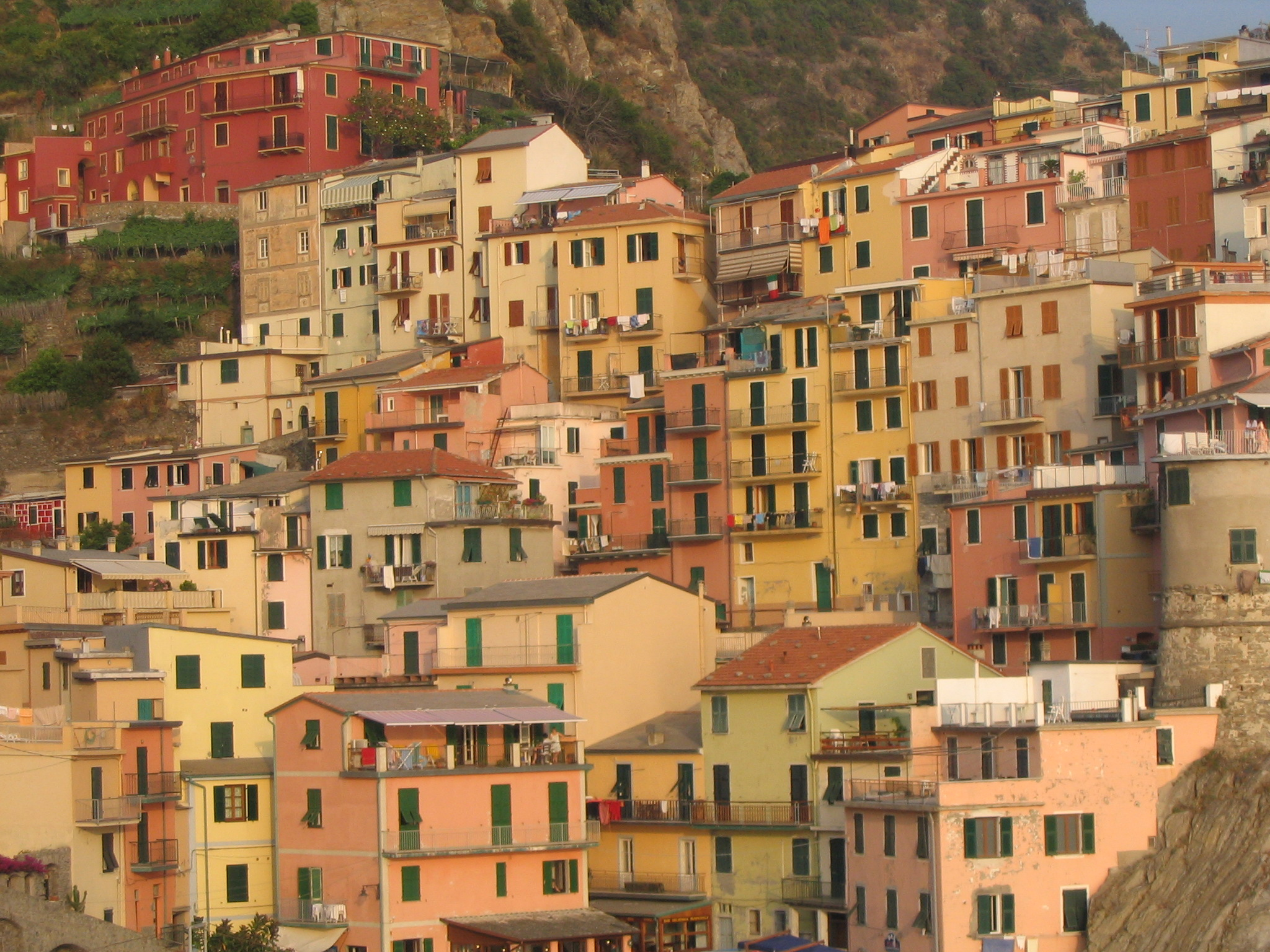
Manarola's historic buildings

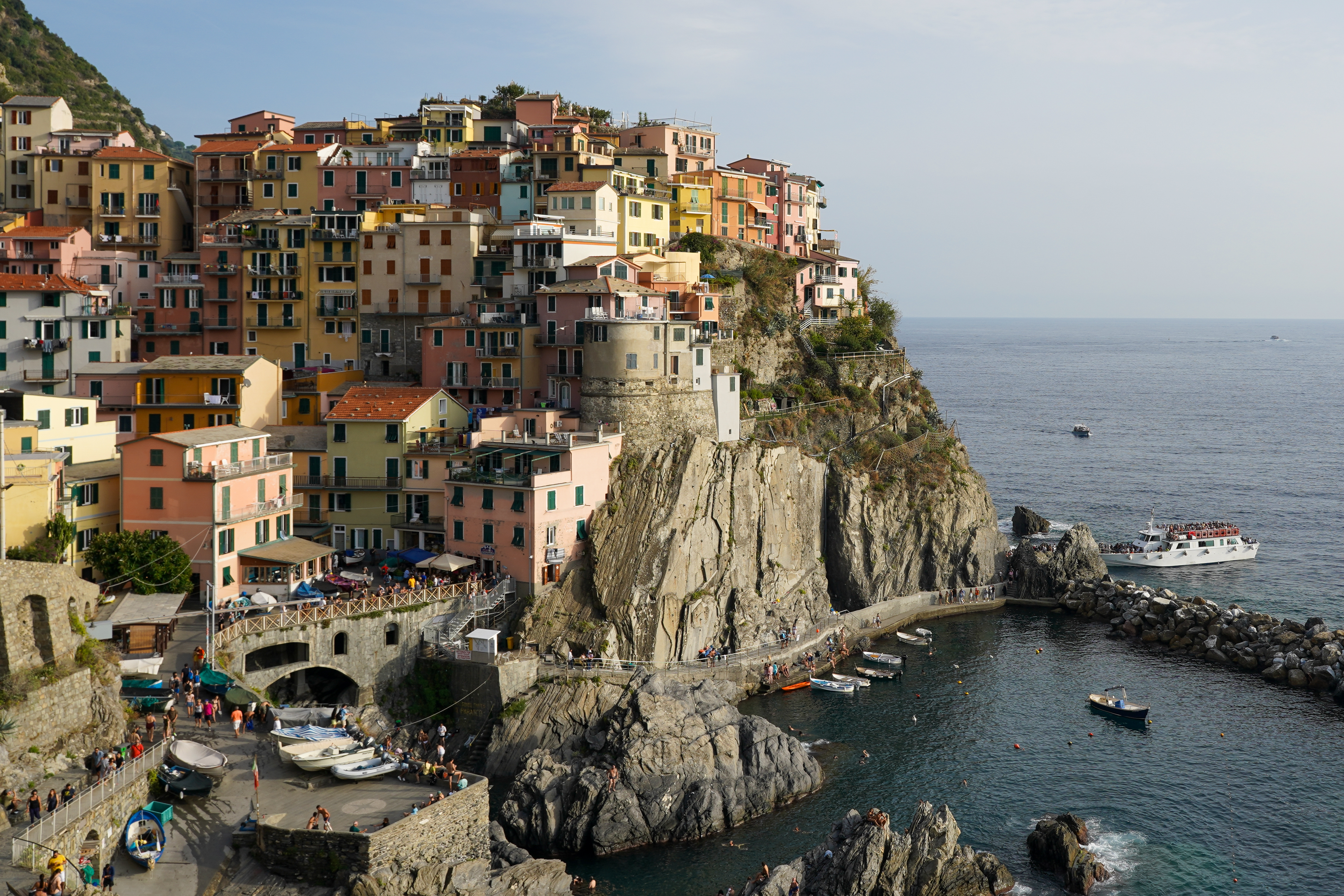
Close view of Manarola

Manarola (Manaea in the local dialect) is a small town, a frazione of the comune (municipality) of Riomaggiore, in the province of La Spezia, Liguria, Northern Italy. It is the second-smallest of the famous Cinque Terre towns frequented by tourists, with a population of 353.

== Overview ==
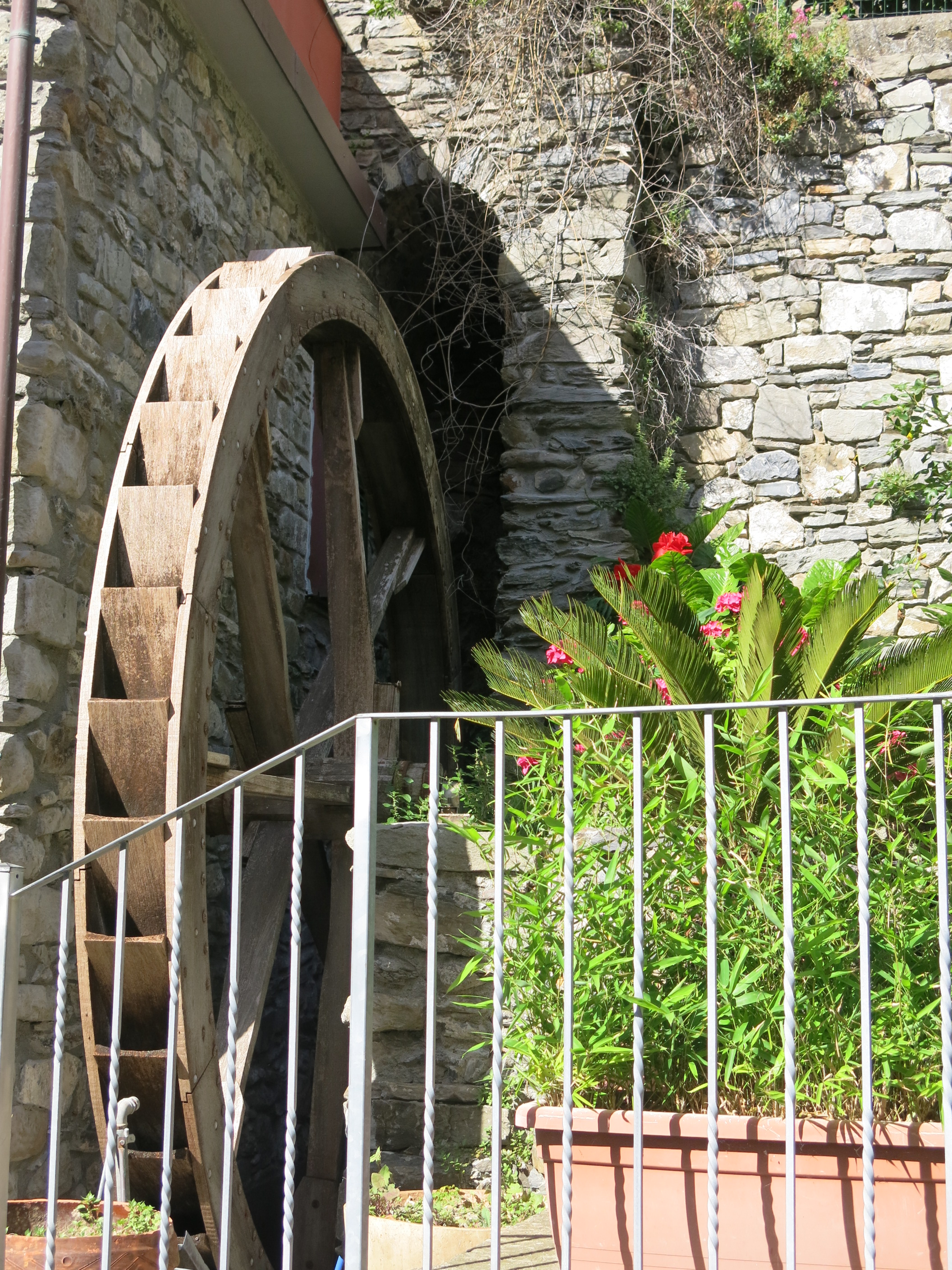
The large wheel which may be the source of the name of the village

Manarola may be the oldest of the towns in the Cinque Terre, with the cornerstone of the church, San Lorenzo, dating from 1338. The local dialect is Manarolese, which is marginally different from the dialects in the nearby area. The name "Manarola" is probably a dialectical evolution of the Latin, "Magna rota". In the Manarolese dialect, this was changed to "Magna roea" which means "large wheel", about the mill wheel in the town. Manarola has a railway station on the Genoa–Pisa railway.

Manarola's primary industries have traditionally been fishing and wine-making. The local wine, called Sciacchetrà, is especially renowned; references from ancient Roman writings mention the high quality of the wine produced in the region. Manarola and its neighboring towns have become popular tourist destinations, particularly in the summer months. Tourist attractions in the region include a famous walking trail between Manarola and Riomaggiore (called Via dell'Amore, "Love's Trail") and hiking trails in the hills and vineyards above the town. Manarola is one of the five villages of the Cinque Terre. Most of the houses are bright and colourful. Manarola was celebrated in paintings by Antonio Discovolo (1874–1956).

== Culture ==
=== Presepe di Manarola ===
Presepe di Manarola
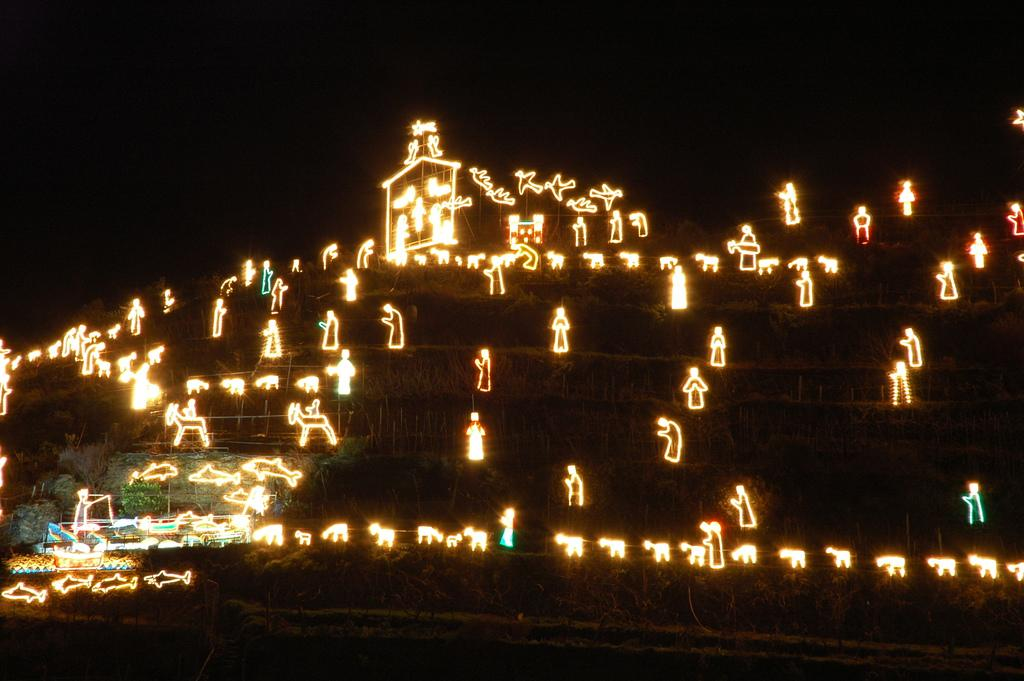
- Presepe luminoso di Manarola
- Status: active
- Genre: Catholic Christian tradition
- Begins: 8 December
- Ends: 2 February
- Frequency: annual
- Locations: Via di Corniglia, 30, 19017 Manarola, La Spezia
- Country: Italy
- Inaugurated: 1961; 65 years ago
- Founder: Mario Andreoli
- Most recent: From 8 December 2022 to 29 January 2023
- Organiser: Associazione Presepe di Manarola Mario Andreoli

Since 1961, during the Christmas season, an evocative luminous nativity scene has been set up on the hill overlooking the village, whose characters, handcrafted by Mario Andreoli, a retired railwayman, are made up of thousands and thousands of lights on special templates that give the representation a unique charm in the world. Andreoli built the original nucleus of the crib figures, of what was consecrated in 2007 as the largest nativity scene in the world. The statues were made with recycled materials. The lighting of the luminous nativity scene takes place every year on December 8.

In the days before 8 December 2022, the date on which the Nativity scene was lit, Andreoli had requested that the fireworks be made, an event not foreseen in recent years. On 22 December 2022, Andreoli died at the age of 94. His work in the creation of the manger, its preparation and conservation will be managed and preserved by the association that takes his name, established on 2 November 2017.

=== Via Crucis ===
In addition to the famous crib, during the Easter period, Andreoli created a luminous Via Crucis on the same hill.

=== Festa di San Lorenzo ===
For the Festa di San Lorenzo, Andreoli created a luminous representation of the saint on the grill, the place of his legendary martyrdom.

== In popular culture ==
The cliffside village of St. Olga in Half Life 2: Lost Coast appears to be based on Manarola. The similarity of the bay can be seen as players climb the cliffs.

Like its fellow Cinque Terre town of Riomaggiore, it was featured in the video game Forza Horizon 2. Manarola was not featured as the main location but was referenced on various road signs.

The Cinque Terre towns, Manarola included, are the inspiration for the town of Portorosso in the 2021 animated film Luca.

A town named Manaea, in the video game Just Cause 3 is based on Manarola.

== See also ==
- Riomaggiore
- Vernazza
- Monterosso al Mare
- Corniglia
