= Riomaggiore =

Riomaggiore Rimazùu
- Comune
- Comune di Riomaggiore
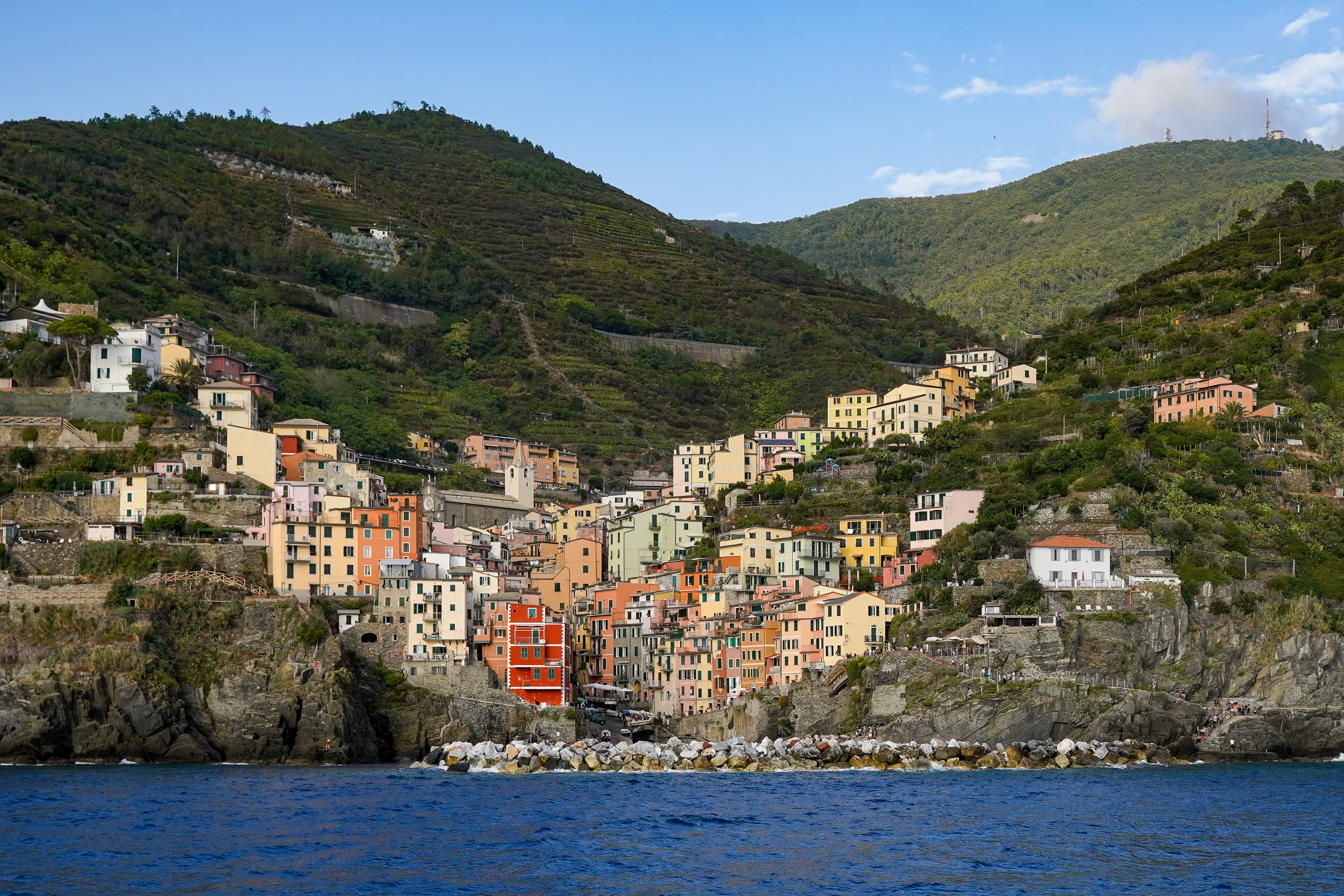
- View of Riomaggiore from the sea

- Coat of arms

- Location within Italy Location within Liguria
- Coordinates: 44°06′N 09°45′E
- Country: Italy
- Region: Liguria
- Province: La Spezia (SP)
- Founded: 1861
- Frazioni: Groppo, Manarola, Volastra

Government
  - Mayor: Fabrizia Pecunia (Cittadini in comune)

Area
  - Total: 10.27 km^{2} (3.97 sq mi)
- Elevation: 35 m (115 ft)

Population (June 2024)
  - Total: 1,297
  - Density: 126.3/km^{2} (327.1/sq mi)
- Demonym: Riomaggioresi
- Time zone: UTC+1 (CET)
  - Summer (DST): UTC+2 (CEST)
- Postal code: 19017
- Dialing code: 0187
- ISTAT code: 011024
- Patron saint: John the Baptist
- Saint day: 24 June
- Website: www.comune.riomaggiore.sp.it

Riomaggiore (Ligurian: Rimazzô, locally Rimazùu) is a village and comune in the province of La Spezia, situated in a small valley in the Liguria region of Italy. It is the most southerly of the Cinque Terre villages.

Riomaggiore, the southern-most village of the Cinque Terre

The village, dating from the early thirteenth century, is known for its historic character and wine produced by the town's vineyards. Riomaggiore is in the Riviera di Levante region. It has a shoreline on the Mediterranean's Gulf of Genoa, with a small beach and a wharf framed by tower houses. Riomaggiore's main street is Via Colombo, where numerous restaurants, bars, and shops can be found.

The Via dell'Amore is a path connecting Riomaggiore to its frazione Manarola, also part of the Cinque Terre.

Riomaggiore is the most southern village of the Cinque Terre, all connected by trail. The water and mountainside have been declared national parks.

Riomaggiore inspired paintings by Telemaco Signorini (1835–1901), one of the artists of the Macchiaioli group.

== Demographics ==
Historical population

Year	Pop.	±%
1861	2,600	—
1871	3,183	+22.4%
1881	3,118	−2.0%
1901	3,463	+11.1%
1911	3,332	−3.8%
1921	3,572	+7.2%
1931	3,377	−5.5%
1936	3,355	−0.7%

Year	Pop.	±%
1951	3,239	−3.5%
1961	3,066	−5.3%
1971	2,649	−13.6%
1981	2,441	−7.9%
1991	2,051	−16.0%
2001	1,809	−11.8%
2011	1,669	−7.7%
2021	1,353	−18.9%

Source: ISTAT

== Transportation ==
Riomaggiore railway station is on the Genoa–Pisa railway. It is served by trains run by Trenitalia, including services from La Spezia Centrale.

== In popular culture ==
Riomaggiore was referenced in the 2014 driving video game Forza Horizon 2.

Riomaggiore and other Cinque Terre towns were the inspiration for the fictional Portorosso in the 2021 animated film Luca.

== Gallery ==
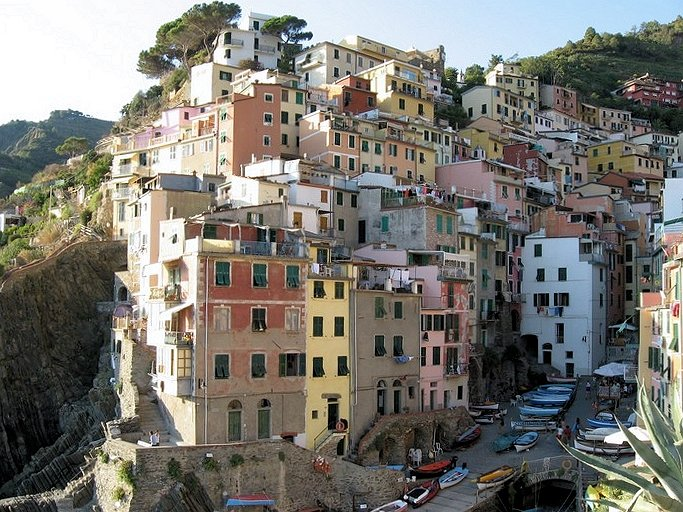
Houses on the rocks

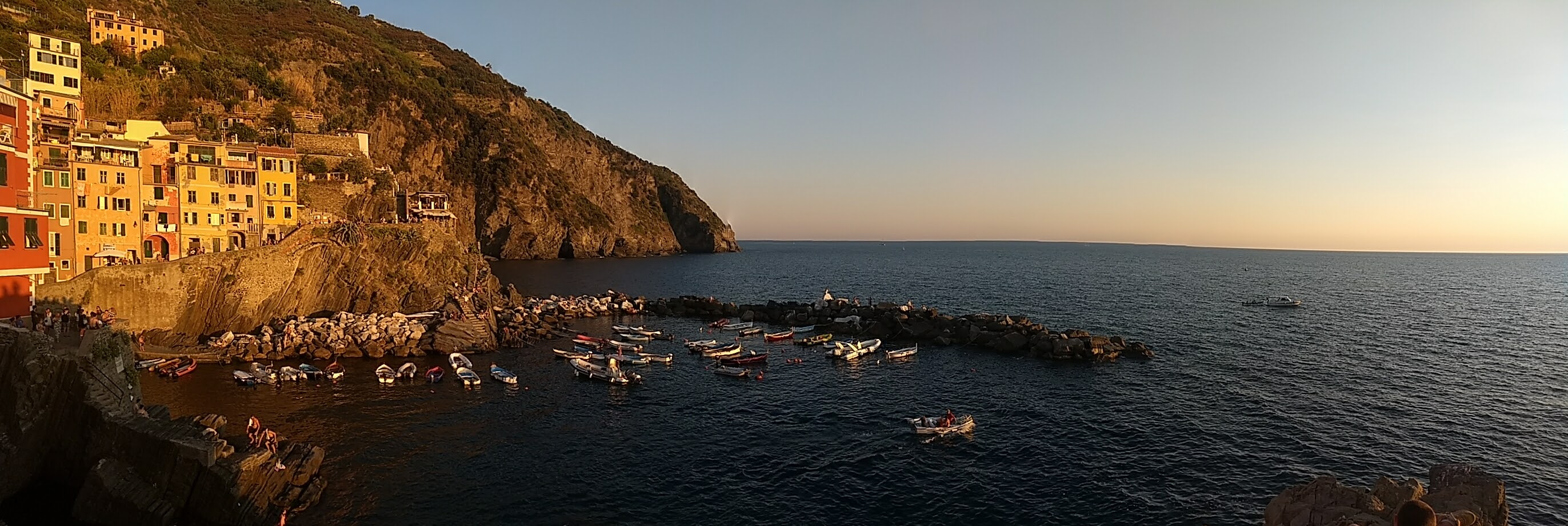
Panorama at sunset in summer

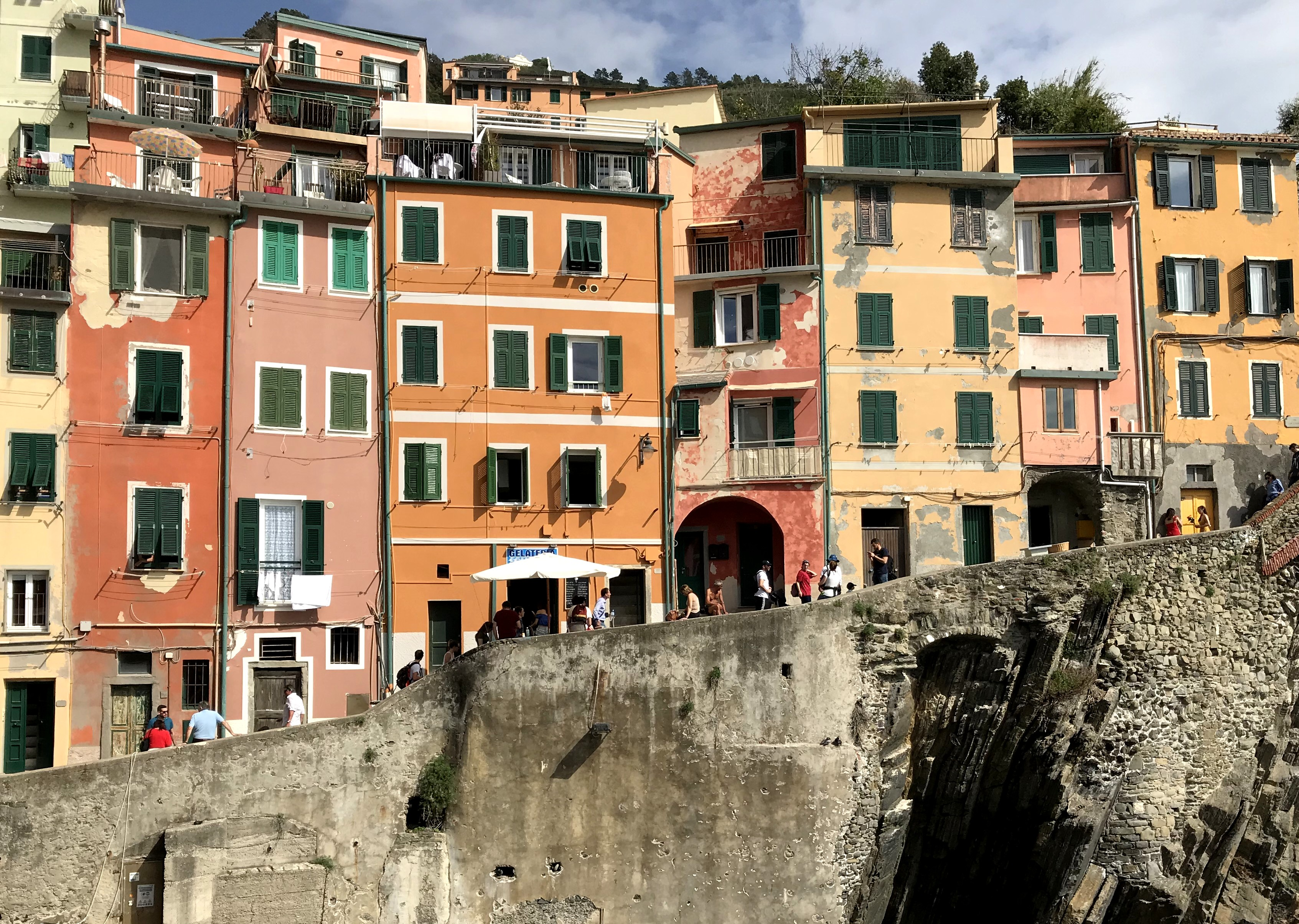
Houses on the slope

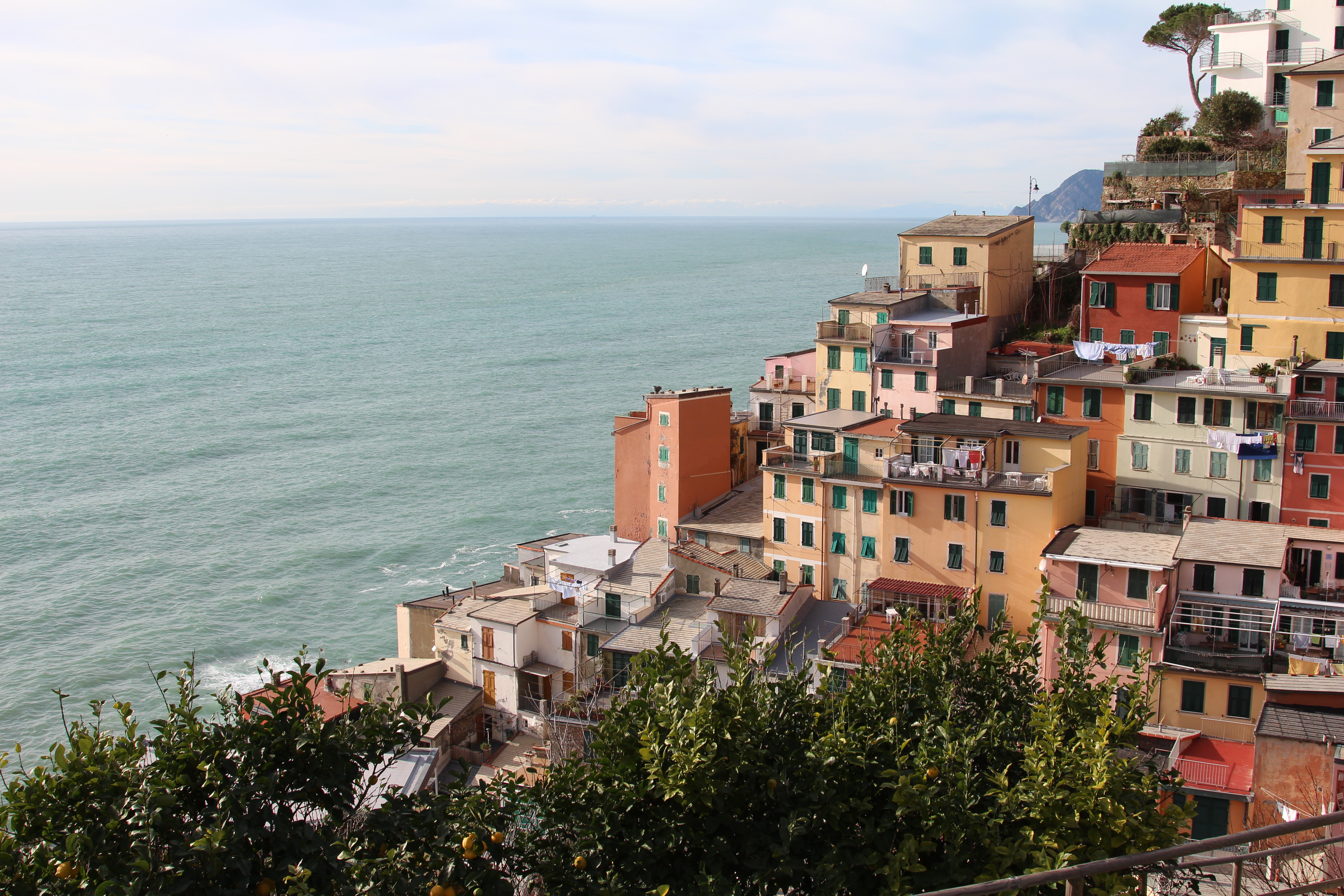
Riomaggiore

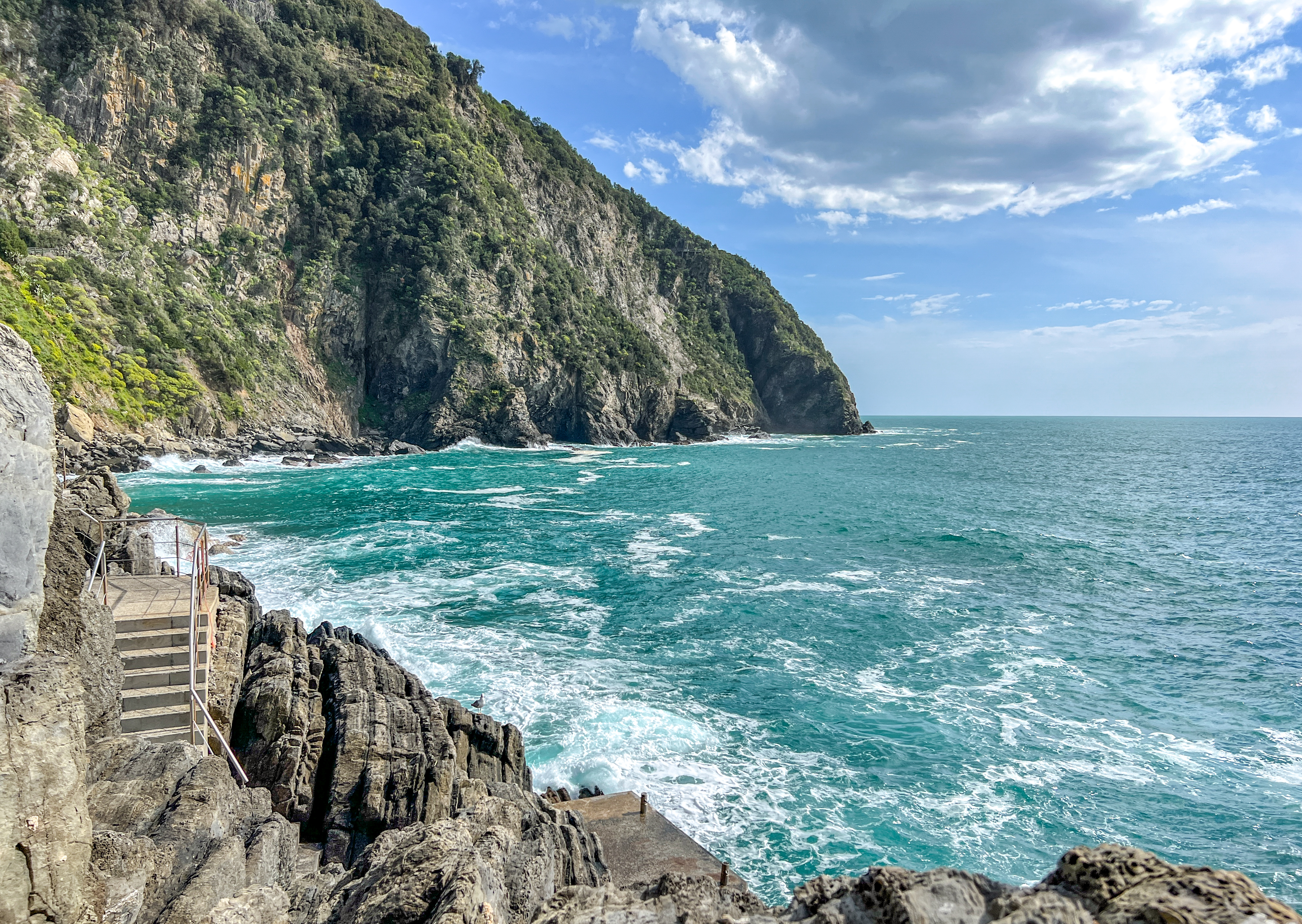
Coast in Riomaggiore

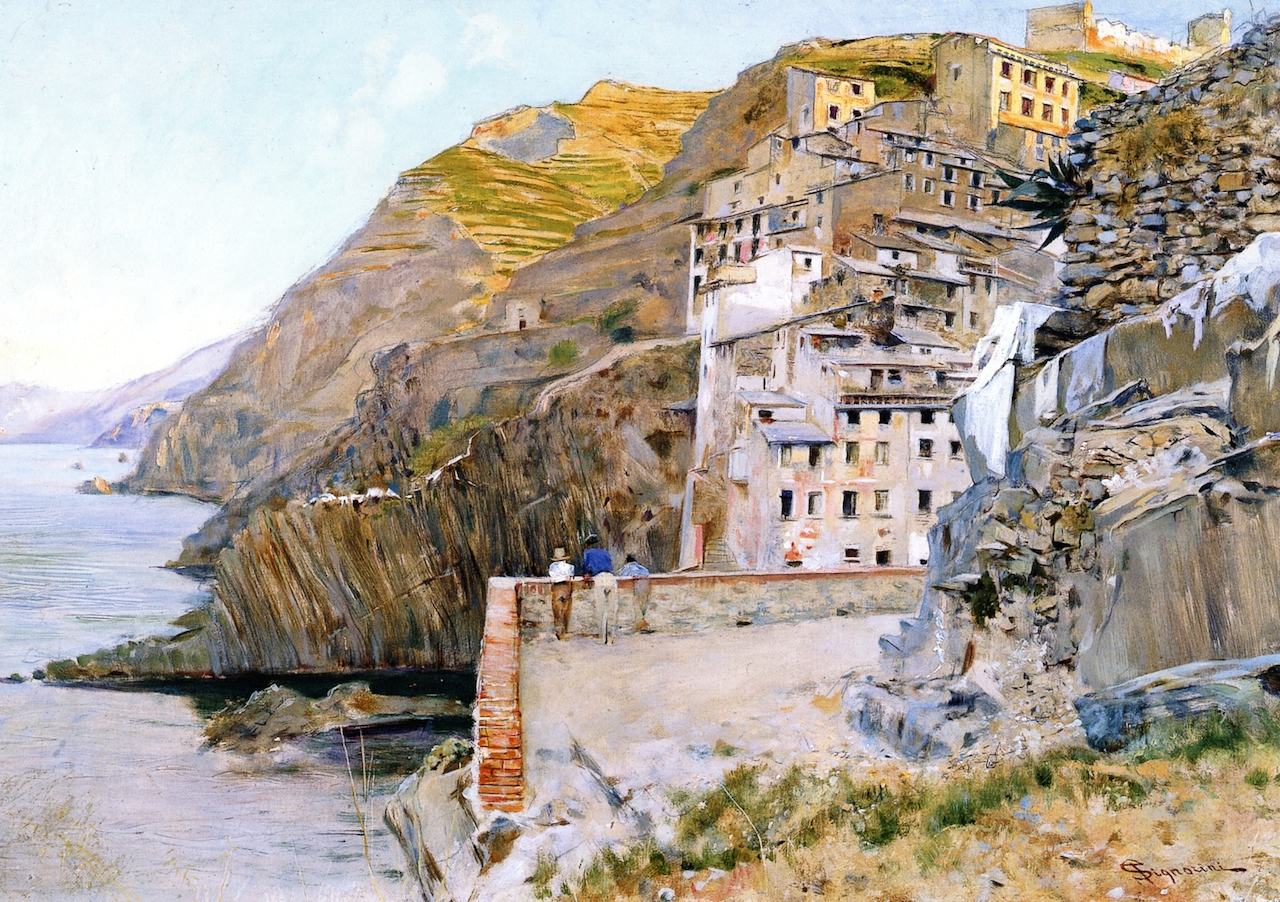
Riomaggiore, c.1895, by Telemaco Signorini

== See also ==
- Liguria wine
- Manarola
- Vernazza
- Monterosso al Mare
- Corniglia
