= List of Italian grape varieties =

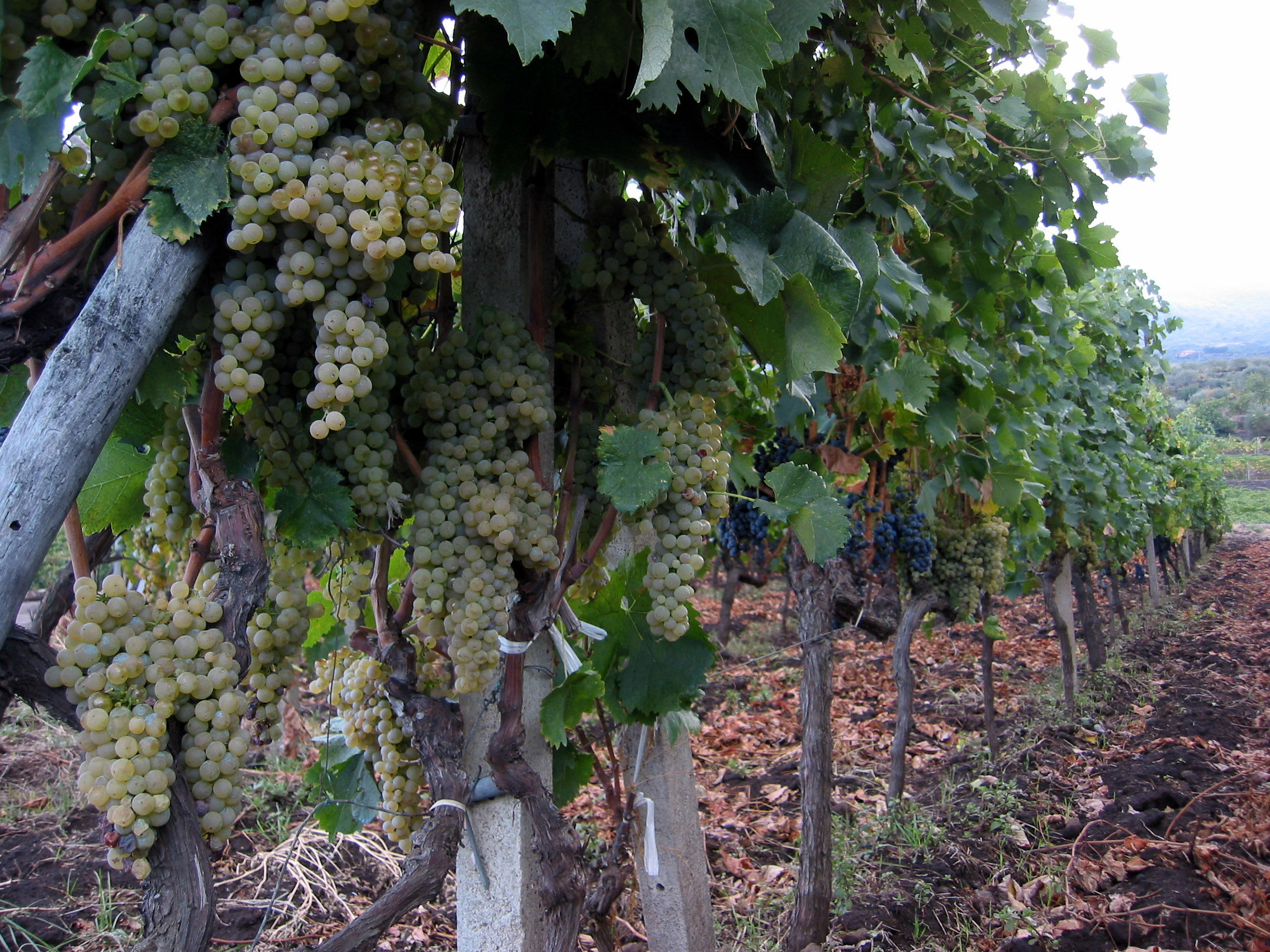
A field blend of red and white Italian grape varieties growing in the Etna region of Sicily

Grape	Color	Region
Abbuoto	Red	Lazio
Abrusco	Red	Tuscany
Acitana	Red	Sicily
Addoraca	White	Calabria
Aglianico	Red	Basilicata and Campania
Aglianicone	Red	Basilicata and Campania
Albana	White	Emilia-Romagna
Albanella	White	Marche
Albanello	White	Sicily
Albaranzeuli bianco	White	Sardinia
Albaranzeuli nero	Red	Sardinia
Albarola	White	Liguria
Albarossa	Red	Veneto
Aleatico	Red	Puglia and Lazio
Alionza	White	Emilia-Romagna
Ancellotta	Red	Emilia-Romagna
Arilla	White	Campania
Arneis	White	Piedmont
Arvesiniadu	White	Sardinia
Avanà	Red	Piedmont
Avarengo	Red	Piedmont
Baratuciat	White	Piedmont
Barbarossa	Red	Liguria and Piedmont
Barbera	Red	Piedmont
Barbera bianca	White	Piedmont
Barbera del Sannio	Red	Campania
Barbera Sarda	Red	Sardinia
Bariadorgia	White	Sardinia
Barsaglina	Red	Tuscany and Liguria
Bellone	White	Lazio
Besgano bianco	White	Emilia-Romagna
Biancame	White	Marche and Emilia-Romagna
Bianchetta Trevigiana	White	Veneto, Trentino-Alto Adige/Südtirol
Bianco d'Alessano	White	Puglia and Calabria
Biancolella	White	Campania
Biancone di Portoferraio	White	Tuscany
Bigolona	White	Veneto
Blatterle	White	Trentino-Alto Adige/Südtirol
Bombino bianco	White	Puglia
Bombino nero	Red	Puglia, Basilicata, Lazio and Sardinia
Bonamico	Red	Tuscany
Bonarda Piemontese	Red	Piedmont
Bonda	Red	Aosta Valley
Bosco	White	Liguria
Bracciola nera	Red	Liguria and Tuscany
Brachetto	Red	Piedmont
Brugnola	Red	Lombardy
Brustiano bianco	White	Sardinia
Bubbierasco	Red	Piedmont and Friuli Venezia
Bussanello	White	Sardinia
Cacamosa	White	Campania
Caddiu	White	Sardinia
Calabrese di Montenuovo	Red	Campania
Caloria	Red	Tuscany
Canaiolo nero	Red	Tuscany, Lazio, Marche, Sardinia
Cannamelu	Red	Campania
Caprettone	White	Campania
Cargarello	White	Emilia Romagna
Carica l'Asino	White	Piedmont
Carricante	White	Sicily
Casavecchia di Pontelatone		
Cascarolo bianco	White	Piedmont
Casetta	Red	Campania
Castagnara		
Castiglione		
Catalanesca		
Catanese nero	Red	Sicily
Catarratto bianco	White	Sicily
Cavrara		
Centesimino		
Cerreto		
Cesanese	Red	Lazio
Cianorie		
Ciliegiolo	Red	Tuscany and Umbria
Ciurlese		
Cividin		
Cococciola	White	Abruzzo
Coda di Cavallo bianca		
Coda di Pecora	White	Campania
Coda di Volpe bianca	White	Campania
Colombana nera	Red	Emilia-Romagna and Tuscany
Colorino	Red	Tuscany
Cordenossa		
Cornalin	Red	Aosta Valley
Cornarea		
Cortese	White	Piedmont
Corva		
Corvina Veronese	Red	Veneto
Corvinone	Red	Veneto
Croatina	Red	Lombardy and Emilia-Romagna
Crovassa		
Damaschino		
Dindarella		
Dolcetto	Red	Piedmont
Dolciame		
Dorona di Venezia		
Doux d'Henry		
Drupeggio	White	Tuscany and Umbria
Durella	White	Veneto
Enantio		
Erbaluce	White	Piedmont
Erbamat		
Ervi		
Falanghina Beneventana		
Falanghina	White	Campania
Fenile		
Fertilia		
Fiano	White	Campania
Flavis		
Fogarina		
Foglia Tonda		
Forastera	White	Campania
Forgiarin		
Forsellina		
Fortana	Red	Emilia-Romagna
Francavidda		
Frappato	Red	Sicily
Frauler		
Freisa	Red	Piedmont
Friulano	White	Veneto
Fubiano		
Fumin	Red	Aosta Valley
Gaglioppo	Red	Calabria
Galatena		
Gallioppo delle Marche		
Gallizzone		
Gamba di Pernice		
Garganega	White	Veneto
Ginestra		
Girò	Red	Sardinia
Glera	White	Veneto
Grapariol		
Grechetto	White	Umbria
Greco bianco	White	Campania and Puglia
Greco nero	Red	Calabria
Greco nero di Sibari		
Greco nero di Verbicaro		
Grignolino	Red	Piedmont
Grillo	White	Sicily
Grisa nera	Red	Piedmont
Groppello di Mocasina		
Groppello di Revò		
Groppell di Gentile		
Gruaja		
Guardavalle		
Impigno		
Incrocio bianco Fedit 51		
Incrocio Bruni 54		
Incrocio Manzoni 2.15	Red	Veneto
Incrocio Terzi 1		
Invernenga		
Inzolia	White	Sicily
Italia	White	Lombardy
Italica		
Lacrima	Red	Marche
Lagarino bianco	White	Trentino
Lagrein	Red	Trentino
Lambrusca di Alessandria		
Lambrusca Vittona		
Lambruschetto		
Lambrusco Barghi		
Lambrusco di Fiorano		
Lambrusco di Sorbara	Red	Emilia-Romagna
Lambrusco Grasparossa		
Lambrusco Maestri		
Lambrusco Marani		
Lambrusco Montericco		
Lambrusco Oliva		
Lambrusco Salamino		
Lambrusco Viadanese		
Lanzesa		
Luglienga	White	Piedmont
Lumassina		
Maceratino	White	Marche
Magliocco Canino	Red	Calabria
Magliocco Dolce	Red	Calabria
Maiolica		
Maiolina		
Malbo Gentile		
Maligia		
Malvasia bianca di Basilicata		
Malvasia bianca di Candia		
Malvasia bianca di Piemonte		
Malvasia bianca Lunga		
Malvasia del Lazio		
Malvasia di Candia Aromatica		
Malvasia di Casorzo		
Malvasia di Lipari		
Malvasia di Schierano		
Malvasia nera di Basilicata		
Malvasia nera di Brindisi		
Malvasia nera Lunga		
Mammolo	Red	Tuscany
Mantonico bianco	White	Calabria
Manzoni bianco	White	Veneto
Manzoni Moscato	Red	Veneto
Manzoni rosa	Pink	Veneto
Marchione		
Maruggio		
Marzemina bianca	White	Veneto
Marzemino	Red	Trentino
Mayolet		
Mazzese		
Melara		
Minella bianca	White	Sicily
Minutolo		
Molinara	Red	Veneto
Monica nera	Red	Sardinia
Montepulciano	Red	Abruzzo, Umbria, Marche, Lazio, Puglia and Molise
Montonico bianco	White	Calabria
Montù	White	Emilia-Romagna
Moradella		
Morone		
Moscatello Selvatico		
Moscato di Scanzo	Red Muscat	Lombardy
Moscato di Terracina		
Moscato Giallo		
Moscato rosa del Trentino		
Mostosa		
Muscat blanc à Petits Grains	White	Piedmont
Nascetta	White	Piedmont
Nasco	White	Sardinia
Nebbiera		
Nebbiolo	Red	Piedmont and Lombardy
Nebbiolo rosé		
Negrara Trentina		
Negrara Veronese	Red	Veneto
Negretto		
Negroamaro	Red	Puglia
Ner d'Ala		
Nerello Cappuccio		
Nerello Mascalese		
Neret di Saint-Vincent		
Neretta Cuneese		
Neretto di Bairo		
Neretto Duro		
Neretto Gentile		
Neretto Nostrano		
Nero Buono di Cori		
Nero d'Avola	Red	Sicily
Nero di Troia		
Nieddera		
Nigra		
Nocera	Red	Sicily
Nosiola	White	Trentino
Notardomenico		
Nuragus	White	Sardinia
Ortrugo	White	Emilia-Romagna
Oseleta		
Pallagrello bianco	White	Campania
Pallagrello nero	Red	Campania
Pampanuto	White	Puglia
Paolina		
Pascale	Red	Sardinia
Passau		
Passerina	White	Marche
Pavana		
Pecorino	White	Abruzzo, Marche, Umbria, Lazio, Tuscany and Liguria
Pelaverga	Red	Piedmont
Peleverga Piccolo	Red	Piedmont
Pepella	White	Campania
Perera	White	Veneto
Perricone	Red	Sicily
Petit Rouge	Red	Aosta Valley
Piccola nera	Red	Friuli-Venezia Giulia
Picolit	White	Friuli-Venezia Giulia
Piculit Neri	Red	Friuli-Venezia Giulia
Piedirosso	Red	Campania
Pignola Valtellinese	Red	Lombardy
Pignoletto	White	Emilia-Romagna
Pignolo	Red	Friuli-Venezia Giulia
Pinella		
Plassa	Red	Piedmont
Pollera nera	Red	Liguria
Prié	White	Aosta Valley
Primetta		
Prodest		
Prosecco Lungo		
Prunesta	Red	Calabria
Pugnitello		
Quagliano		
Raboso Piave	Red	Veneto
Raboso Veronese		
Raspirosso		
Rastajola		
Rebo		
Recantina		
Refosco dal Peduncolo rosso	Red	Friuli-Venezia Giulia
Refosco di Faedis		
Retagliado bianco	White	Sardinia
Ribolla Gialla	White	Friuli-Venezia Giulia
Ripolo		
Rollo		
Rondinella	Red	Veneto
Rossara Trentina		
Rossese bianco	White	Piedmont
Rossese bianco di Monforte		
Rossese bianco di Biagio		
Rossese di Campochiesa		
Rossetto		
Rossignola	Red	Veneto
Rossola nera	Red	Lombardy
Rossolino nero	Red	Lombardy
Roussin		
Roussin de Morgex	Red	Aosta Valley
Rovello bianco	White	Campania
Ruchè		
Ruggine		
Ruzzese		
Sabato		
Sagrantino	Red	Umbria
San Giuseppe nero	Red	Lazio
San Lunardo		
San Martino		
San Michele		
San Pietro		
Sangiovese	Red	Tuscany, Lazio, Emilia-Romagna, Umbria, Marche
Sant'Antonio		
Santa Maria		
Santa Sofia		
Schiava Gentile		
Schiava Grigia		
Schiava Grossa	Red	Trentino
Schiava Lombarda		
Schioppettino	Red	Friuli-Venezia Giulia
Sciaglìn		
Sciascinoso	Red	Campania
Scimiscià		
Semidano		
Sgavetta		
Soperga		
Sorbigno		
Spergola		
Suppezza		
Susumaniello	Red	Puglia
Tamurro		
Tazzelenghe	Red	Friuli-Venezia Giulia
Termarina rossa	Red	Emilia-Romagna
Teroldego	Red	Trentino
Terrano	Red	Friuli-Venezia Giulia
Tignolino		
Timorasso	White	Piedmont
Tintilia del Molise	Red	Molise
Tintore di Tramonti		
Torbato	White	Sardinia
Trebbiano d'Abruzzo		
Trebbiano Giallo		
Trebbiano Modenese		
Trebbiano Romagnolo		
Trebbiano Spoletino		
Trebbiano Toscano		
Trebbiano nera		
Tronto		
Ucelùt		
Uva della Cascina		
Uva Longanesi		
Uva Rara	Red	Piedmont and Lombardy
Uva Tosca	Red	Emilia-Romagna
Uvalino	Red	Piedmont
Valentino nero	Red	Piedmont
Vega	White	Veneto
Verdea	White	Lombardy, Tuscany and Emilia-Romagna
Verdeca	White	Emilia-Romagna
Verdello	White	Umbria
Verdicchio bianco	White	Marche
Verdiso	White	Veneto
Verduzzo Friulano	White	Friuli-Venezia Giulia
Verduzzo Trevigiano	White	Veneto
Vermentino	White	Sardinia, Liguria and Piedmont
Vermentino nero	Red	Tuscany
Vernaccia di Oristano	White	Sardinia
Vernaccia di San Gimignano	White	Tuscany
Versoaln	White	Trentino-Alto Adige/Südtirol
Vespaiola	White	Veneto
Vespolina	Red	Piedmont
Vien de Nus	Red	Aosta Valley
Vitovska	White	Friuli-Venezia Giulia
Vuillermin	Red	Aosta Valley

== Supplemental references used for chart ==
- J. Robinson, J. Harding and J. Vouillamoz Wine Grapes - A complete guide to 1,368 vine varieties, including their origins and flavours pgs XXVIII-XXX Allen Lane 2012. ISBN 978-1-846-14446-2.
