= Marzemina bianca =

Variety of grape

Marzemina bianca is a white Italian wine grape variety that is grown in the Veneto region of northeastern Italy. Ampelographers believe that the grape is a natural crossing of the Trentino wine grape Marzemino and the Soave wine grape Garganega. This parent-offspring relationship between Marzemina bianca and Marzemino makes the variety distinct from grapes like Pinot blanc and Grenache blanc which are other color mutations of Pinot noir and Grenache, respectively. DNA analysis has confirmed that the Veneto grape Raboso Veronese is the offspring of Marzemina bianca and Raboso Piave.

Despite having the synonyms Champagna and Champagne Marzemina bianca is not grown in the French wine region of Champagne and is not used in the production of Champagne nor does the grape appear to have any known relation to the traditional Champagne wine grapes of Chardonnay, Pinot noir and Pinot Meunier. While the grape is usually used as a blending component in still wines and late harvest passito style wines, one producer in the Veneto does make a lightly sparkling frizzante version of the grape under the synonym Sampagne that is classified as a vino da tavola.

== History ==
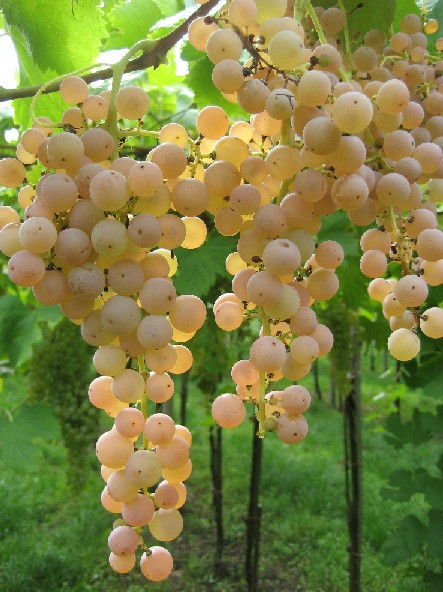
Garganega, one of the parent varieties of Marzemina bianca.

For many years the exact origins of Marzemina bianca were unknown. The grape was first mentioned in 1679 when the Italian writer Giacomo Agostinetti described Marzemina bianca growing around the town of Breganze in the province of Vicenza in Veneto. It was speculated by early ampelographers that the grape may have originated in the Burgundy wine region and found its way to Italy via Germany and Switzerland. However, in 2008 DNA evidence showed that there was a parent-offspring relationship between Marzemina bianca and the Trentino grape Marzemino. As Marzemino was first documented growing in the Veneto in 1553, more than a hundred years before Marzemina bianca, ampelographers now believe that Marzeminia bianca is the offspring with further DNA profiling showing that the Soave grape Garganega (described by the Italian writer Pietro de' Crescenzi in the 13th century) likely being the other parent.

== Viticulture and winemaking ==
Marzemina bianca is a mid-ripening variety that is often allowed to hang on the vine long after sugars have fully accumulated to allow water from the grapes to evaporate and make sweet late-harvest wines. To further concentrate the sugars, after harvest the grapes are laid out on straw mats or hung in well ventilated drying rooms to produce the straw wine style known as passito.

== Wine regions ==
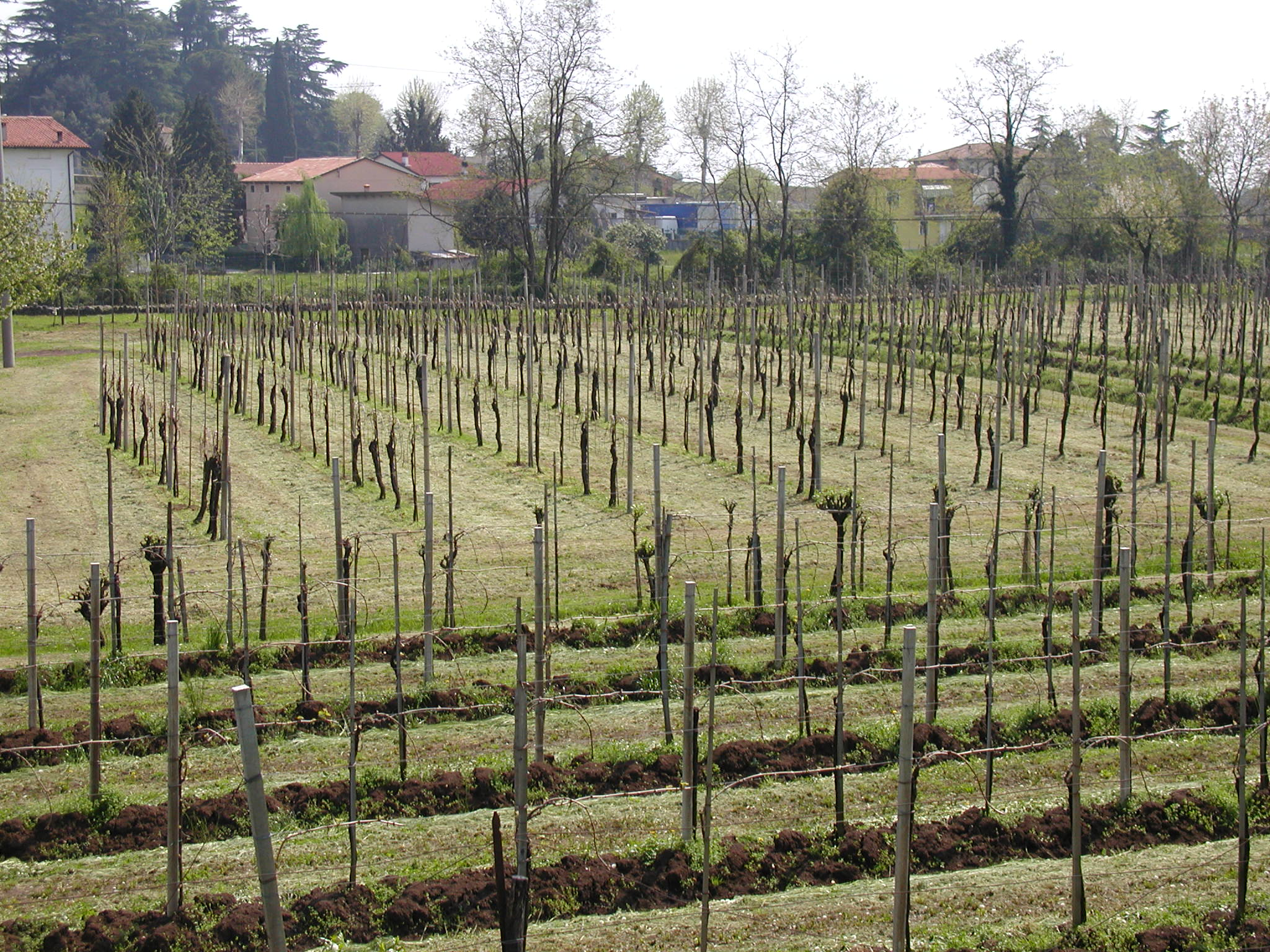
A vineyard in Breganze where Marzemina bianca is still grown.

Marzemina bianca was once widely planted throughout the Veneto region but its numbers took a toll when the phylloxera epidemic hit Italy in the late 19th century. In 2000, there were 83 hectares (205 acres) of the grape reported in Italy, most of it in found in the Padova, Vicenza and Treviso provinces.

It is a permitted grape variety in the Denominazione di origine controllata (DOC) wines of Breganze in the Vicenza province where it is blended with Vespaiola in late-harvest Torcolato wines. In the province of Treviso it is used in the passito wines of the Colli di Conegliano DOC where it is blended with Glera, Verdiso and Verdicchio.

== Styles ==
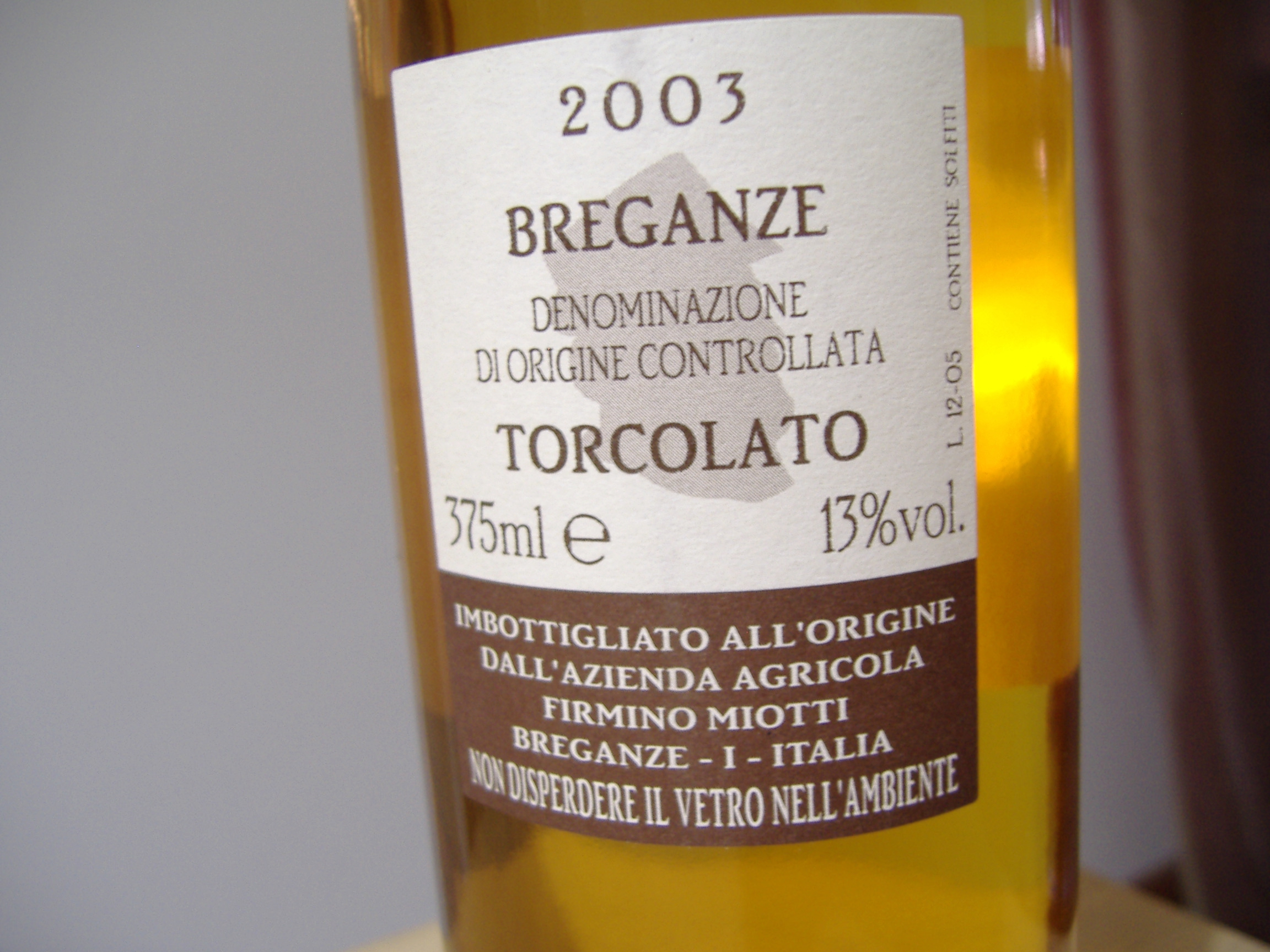
Marzemina is a permitted grape variety allowed to be blended with Vespaiola in the passito straw wine of the Breganze DOC known as Torcolato.

Though Marzemina bianca is most often used in the production of sweet late-harvest wines, it can also be produced as dry varietal or slightly-sparkling frizzante wine. These wines are usually produced as vino da tavola. According to Master of Wine Jancis Robinson, wines made from Marzemina bianca tend to be light bodied with aroma notes of hay and apple that can sometimes have a slightly bitter aftertaste.

== Relationship and confusion with other grapes ==
In addition to the parent-offspring relationship with Marzemino and Garganega, DNA evidence has shown that Marzemina bianca likely crossed with the Veneto grape Raboso Piave to make Raboso Veronese.

Marzemina bianca has several synonyms such as Champagne and Champagna that would suggest some relationship to the French wine region or the grapes used to make the notable French sparkling wine of the same name. But currently DNA evidence has shown no such relationship nor is there a historical connection to the region and its grape varieties. Marzemina bianca is also sometimes confused with Chasselas which originated in Switzerland but is grown in many European wine regions and has the name Marzemina bianca as a synonym. However, there is currently no evidence to suggest a relationship between the two varieties.

== Synonyms ==
Over the years Marzemina bianca has been known under various synonyms including: Berzemina di Breganze, Champagna, Champagne, Sampagne and Sciampagna.
