= Incrocio Manzoni =

Variety of grape

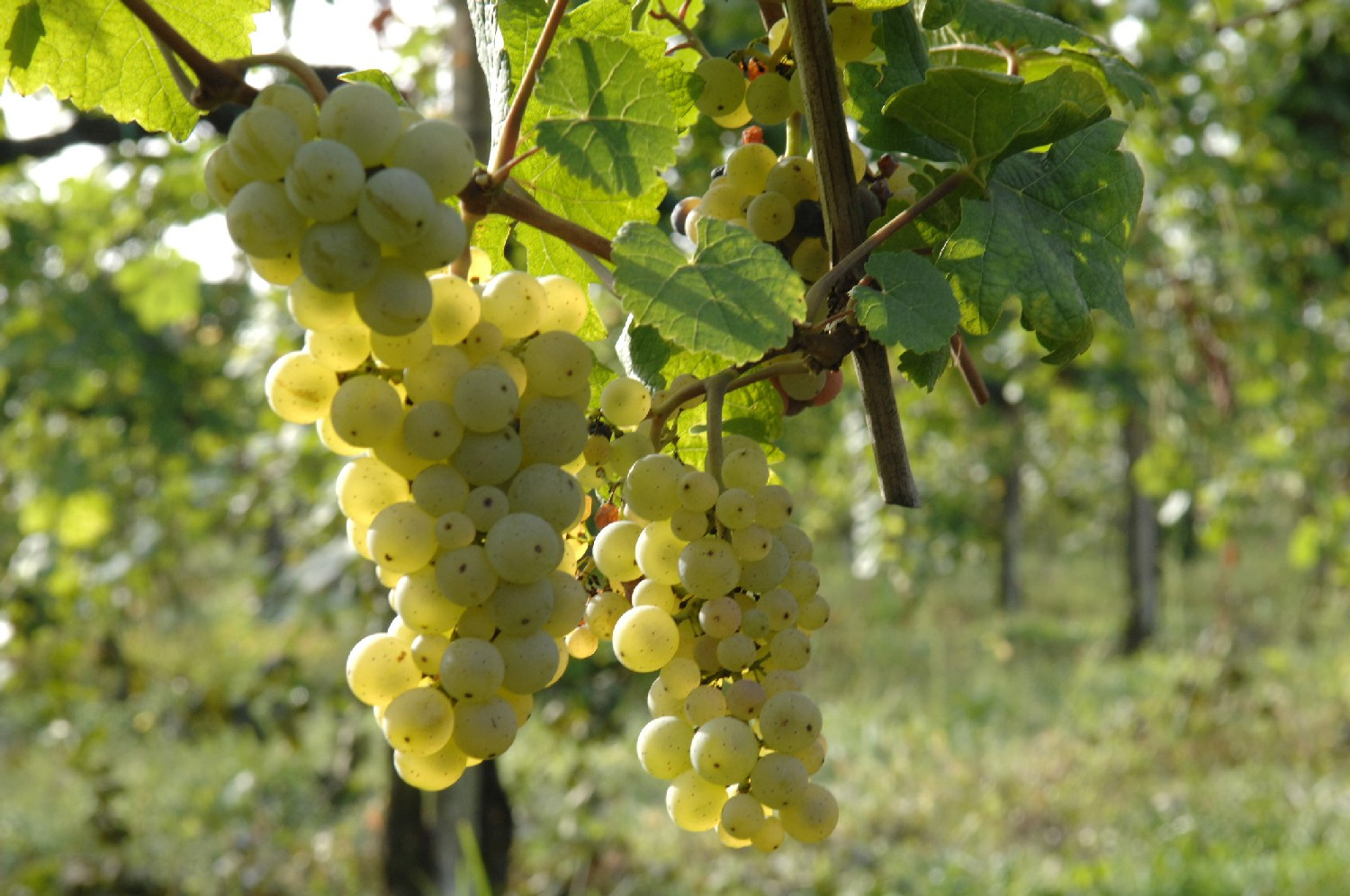
Manzoni bianco.

Incrocio Manzoni or Manzoni grapes is a family of grape varieties named after Professor Luigi Manzoni (1888-1968) of Italy's oldest school of oenology located in Conegliano, in the Veneto region. Manzoni created the new grape varieties by selecting, crossing and grafting vines from various vineyards during the 1920s and 1930s. The family includes both white and red grape varieties. Although most Manzonis are grown in northeastern Italy, they are mainly grown in the Piave area of Province of Treviso and are only now starting to be sold commercially in Europe and the United States.

== Naming convention ==
The name Incrocio is Italian for crossing with the second part of the name usually being the last name of the grape breeder. These means that not every Incrocio grape variety are Manzoni grapes with varieties such as Incrocio bianco Fedit 51 (a Garganega and Malvasia bianca Lunga crossing), Incrocio Bruni 54 (a Sauvignon blanc and Verdicchio crossing) and Incrocio Terzi 1 (a Barbera and Cabernet Franc crossing) being mostly unrelated to Professor Manzoni or his crossings. The numbers after grape type refer to location of the vineyards for the original grafts; for example, 6.0.13 refers to the row, vine and vineyard.

== Grape varieties ==
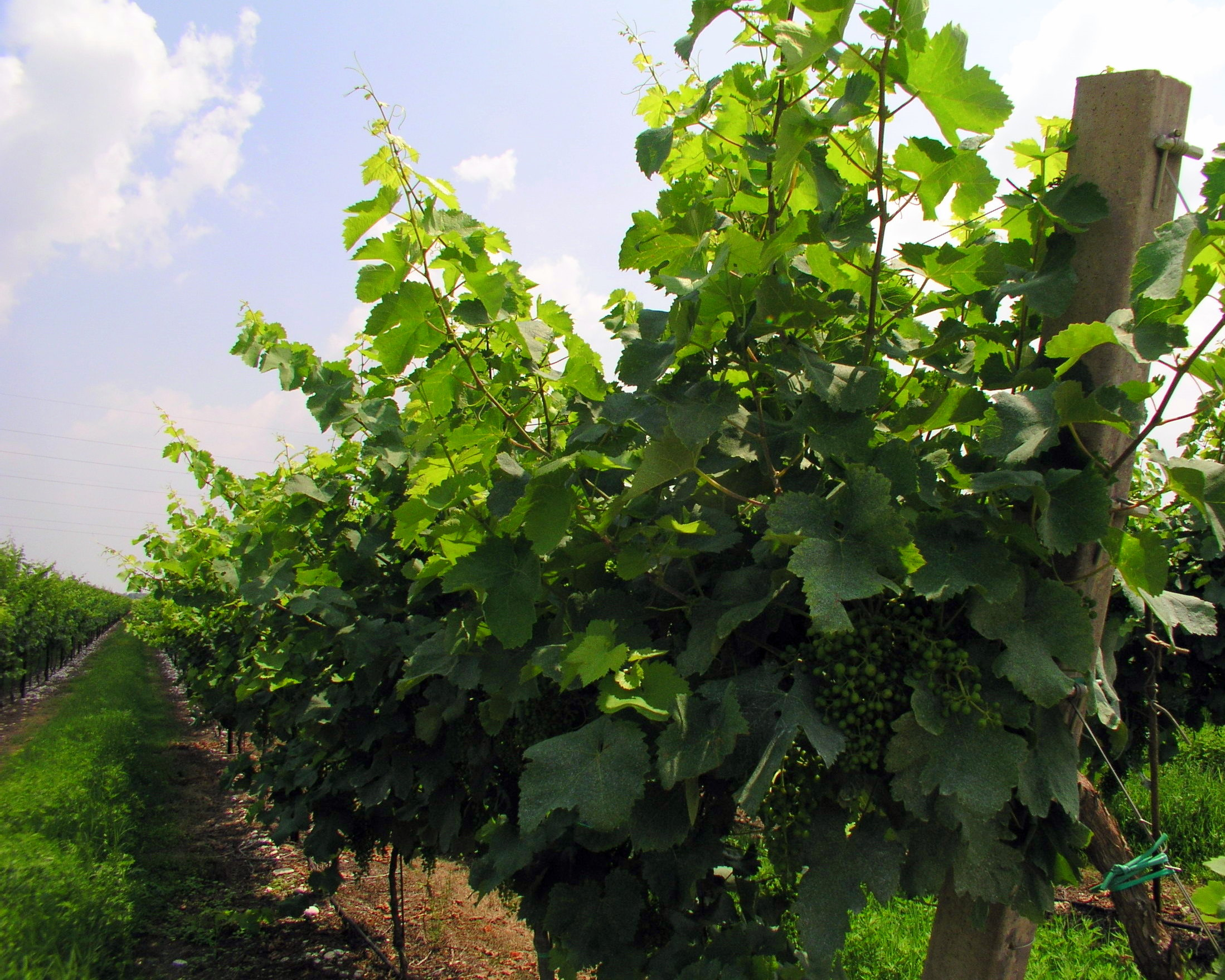
Glera (Prosecco), one of the parent varieties of Manzoni 2.15.

There are several different Incrocio Manzoni grapes which have been selected for cultivation. The two most successful are Manzoni bianco and Manzoni Moscato which are most commonly known under their non-numerical designations, while the others have not had as much success and are rare in plantation.

=== Incrocio Manzoni 2.15 ===
Incrocio Manzoni 2.15 or Manzoni 2.15, is a red variety which is a cross of Glera (formerly known as Prosecco) and Cabernet Sauvignon that was produced during a series of trials between 1924 and 1930. It is also known under the synonyms I.M. 2.15, Manzoni 2-15, Manzoni nero, Manzoni rosso, and Prosecco × Cabernet Sauvignon 2-15.

Professor Manzoni's original intent was to create a white wine grape variety from a crossing of Prosecco and Sauvignon blanc but ended up using pollen from Cabernet Sauvignon which resulted in a black-skinned grape variety. Manzoni 2.15 is a winter-hardy grape variety with good frost resistance that can be very vigorous unless kept in check by winter pruning, vine training and leaf-pulling. Like its parent, Cabernet Sauvignon, it is a late ripening grape that needs a long growing season to achieve full physiological ripeness.

In 2000 there were 169 hectares (420 acres) of Manzoni 2.15 planted mostly in the province of Treviso around the village of Conegliano and hills of Montello. It is a permitted grape variety in the Denominazione di origine controllata (DOC) zone of Colli di Conegliano where it can make up to 10% of the red wine blend along with Cabernet Franc, Cabernet Sauvignon, Merlot and Marzemino. Outside the DOC, it can be made into a varietal wine under the Indicazione geografica tipica (IGT) designation of Colli Trevigiani where some producers have been experimenting with a blanc de noir sparkling wine made using the traditional method of secondary fermentation in the bottle.

According to Master of Wine Jancis Robinson, varietal wines made from Manzoni 2.15 tend to have low tannins with herbaceous aromas (particularly if made from grapes not fully ripe) and notes of both red and black fruits.

=== Manzoni bianco ===
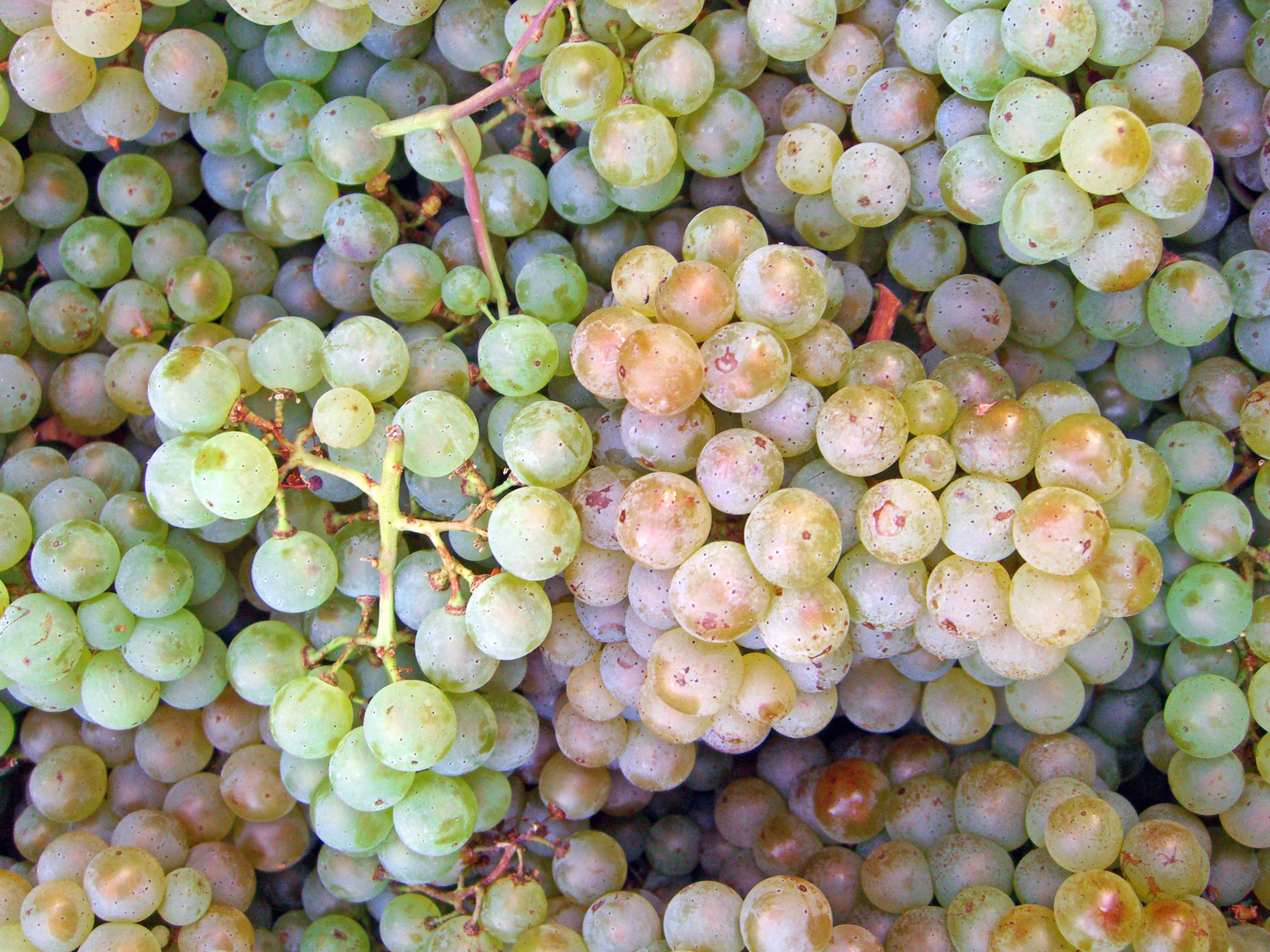
Pinot blanc, one of the parent varieties of Manzoni bianco.

Manzoni bianco or "Incrocio Manzoni 6.0.13", is a white variety which is a cross between the Riesling and Pinot blanc grapes that was created through a series of trials between 1930 and 1935. In 2005, it was suggested that Chardonnay, instead of Pinot blanc, was the second parent of Manzoni bianco, but DNA analysis has shown that Professor Manzoni's original cross is, indeed, Manzoni bianco's parentage. The grape is also known under the further synonyms of "I.M. 6.0.13", "Incrocio Manzoni 6.0.13", "Manzoni 6.0.13", and "Manzoni Bijeli".

From its parents, Manzoni bianco inherited an adaptability to various vineyard soils and climate conditions. It also has strong resistance to many viticultural hazards including the apoplexy grape disease esca, powdery mildew and sour rot. Like Riesling it is an early to mid-ripening grape variety.

In 2000, there were 9,555 hectares (23,610 acres) of Manzoni bianco in Italy, mostly in the Friuli, Trentino, and Veneto regions, but plantings of grape have since spread southwards, so that it can now be found in Calabria, Molise and Apulia. The grape can be used for blending into the white wines of the Colli di Conegliano (at a minimum of 30% of the blend), into Trentino bianco DOCs, and as a varietal in the Vincenza DOC. Producers in the Vigneti delle Dolomiti IGT of northeast Italy have also experimented with various varietal styles, including both spumante and frizzante sparkling wines made from late-harvest grapes. Outside of Italy, Spanish winemakers in the Penedès region of Catalonia have started to plant the variety, making oak-aged varietal examples of the wine.

According to Master of Wine Jancis Robinson, Manzoni bianco is considered to be the most successful and highest quality crossing produced by Professor Manzoni. It is usually made as a dry wine but producers have been making more full-bodied off-dry styles in a manner similar to how German winemakers treat Riesling. Varietal examples of Manzoni bianco tend to be rich and highly aromatic with notes of honey, jasmine, lime, orange-peel and verbena.

=== Manzoni Moscato ===
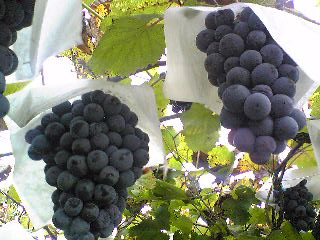
Black Muscat, one of the parent varieties of Manzoni Moscato.

Manzoni Moscato is a red grape variety that is a crossing of Muscat Hamburg (also known as Black Muscat) and Raboso Piave created through a series of trials between 1930 and 1935. It is also known under the synonyms Incrocio Manzoni 13.0.25 and Manzoni 13.0.25.

Professor Manzoni's intent was to create a variety with the soft fruit flavors and consistent yields of Raboso Piave with the robustness and strong viticultural resistance of Muscat Hamburg. The result crossing, Manzoni Moscato, is a late-ripening grape variety that can be very vigorous and productive with strong resistance to powdery mildew.

Today, Manzoni Moscato is one of the least widely planted of the major Manzoni grapes with most of the grape's plantings found in the province of Treviso around the villages of Cessalto, Fontanelle and Mareno di Piave as well as in Tezze sul Brenta in the province of Vicenza. Here the grape is most often used to produce light-bodied, off-dry, sparkling rosé wine that can be very deeply colored for a rosé. The grape is sometimes blended with the pink-skinned Manzoni grape, Manzoni rosa, to produce the sweet wine Manzoni liquoroso which has become a specialty of the Scuola enologica di Conegliano in Conegliano.

=== Manzoni rosa ===
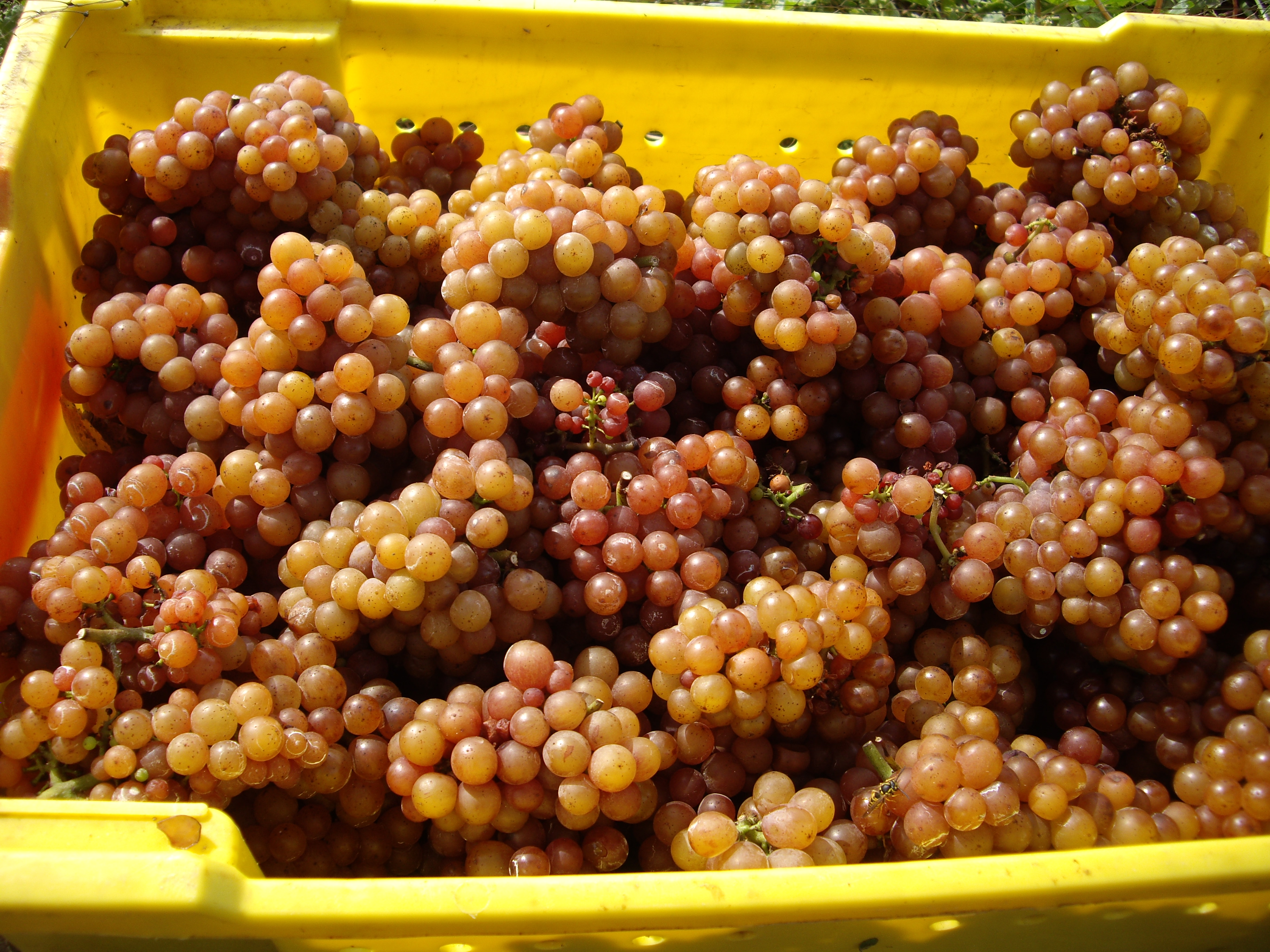
Gewürztraminer, one of the parent varieties of Manzoni rosa.

Manzoni rosa or Incrocio Manzoni 1.50, is a pink-skinned variety which is a cross of Trebbiano and Gewürztraminer (also known as Traminer Aromatico) that was created during a series of trials between 1924 and 1930. Out of these trials four successful crossings were produced with Manzoni ultimately deciding to propagate the crossing that shared the pink-skin coloration of its parent varietal Gewürztraminer. The grape is also known under the synonym Manzoni 1-50.

Professor Manzoni's original intent with the crossing was to create a grape variety that produced the reliable yields and viticultural resistance of Trebbiano with the aromatics and quality potential of Gewürztraminer. The resulting cross, Manzoni rosa, is an early to mid-ripening grapevine that can be very fertile and high yielding with strong resistance to many fungal grape disease.

During the 1950s and 1960s, growers around the viticultural school of Conegliano experimented with plantings of the variety but very few of those original plantings remain in commercial production today. While a few modern producers still make varietal examples of Manzoni rosa, most of the grape's plantings are blended with Manzoni Moscato to make the fortified wine Manzoni liquoroso at the Conegliano school.

== Other crossings ==
- Augusta is a white variety which is a cross of Afus Ali and Luglienga bianca. It is also known under the synonyms Incrocio Manzoni 3.25 or Manzoni 3-25.
- Incrocio Manzoni 2.14 is a red variety which is a cross of Glera (formerly known as Prosecco) and Cabernet Franc. It is also known under the synonym Manzoni 2-14.
- Incrocio Manzoni 3.26 is a white variety which is a cross of Afus Ali and Lignan. It is also known under the synonym Manzoni 3-26.
