= Bigolona =

Variety of grape

Bigolona is a white Italian wine grape variety from the Valpolicella region of northeast Italy where it has been growing since at least the early 19th century. The wine has traditionally been used in the production of late harvest and botrytized dessert wines with the grape's synonym Smarzirola being derived from the Italian marcire meaning "to rot".

== History ==
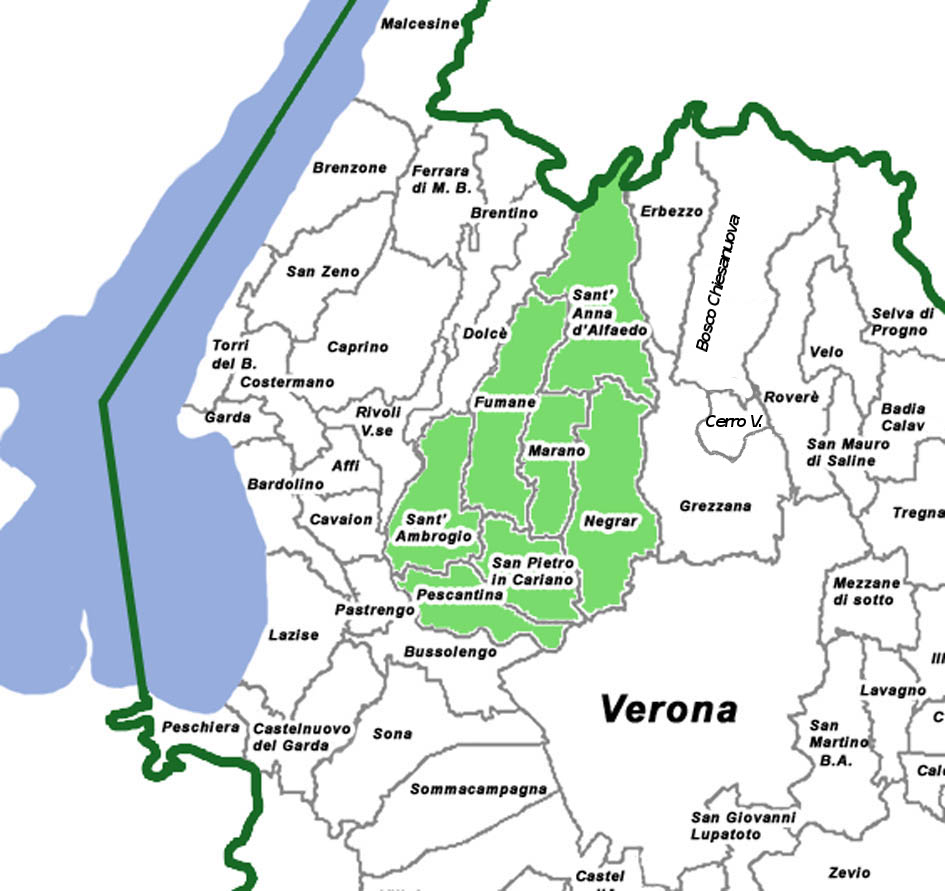
Bigolona has a long history of being grown in the Valpolicella region (highlighted) in the province of Verona, located east of Lake Garda.

Bigolona was first documented growing in the Valpolicella region in the early 19th century. By the 1970s, the grape was on the verge of extinction until viticulturalists at the Istituto Sperimentale per la Viticoltura in Conegliano and Verona began propagating cuttings to preserve the endangered vine. While the grape was not yet listed on the official register of Italian grape varieties in time for the 2000 census, producers within the Veneto Indicazione geografica tipica (IGT) zone have begun making wine from these revived plantings.

== Viticulture ==
Bigolona is a mid-ripening grape variety that lends itself well to the production of late-harvest and botrytized wines. The synonym Smarzirola is derived from the Italian word marcire, which means "to rot", and highlights the grape's affinity for being infected by Botrytis cinerea. Among the viticultural hazards that wine growers of Bigolona have to be mindful is the vigorous nature of the vine and the tendency to produce large, leafy canopy as well as high yields if not kept in check by pruning or green harvesting.

== Wine regions ==
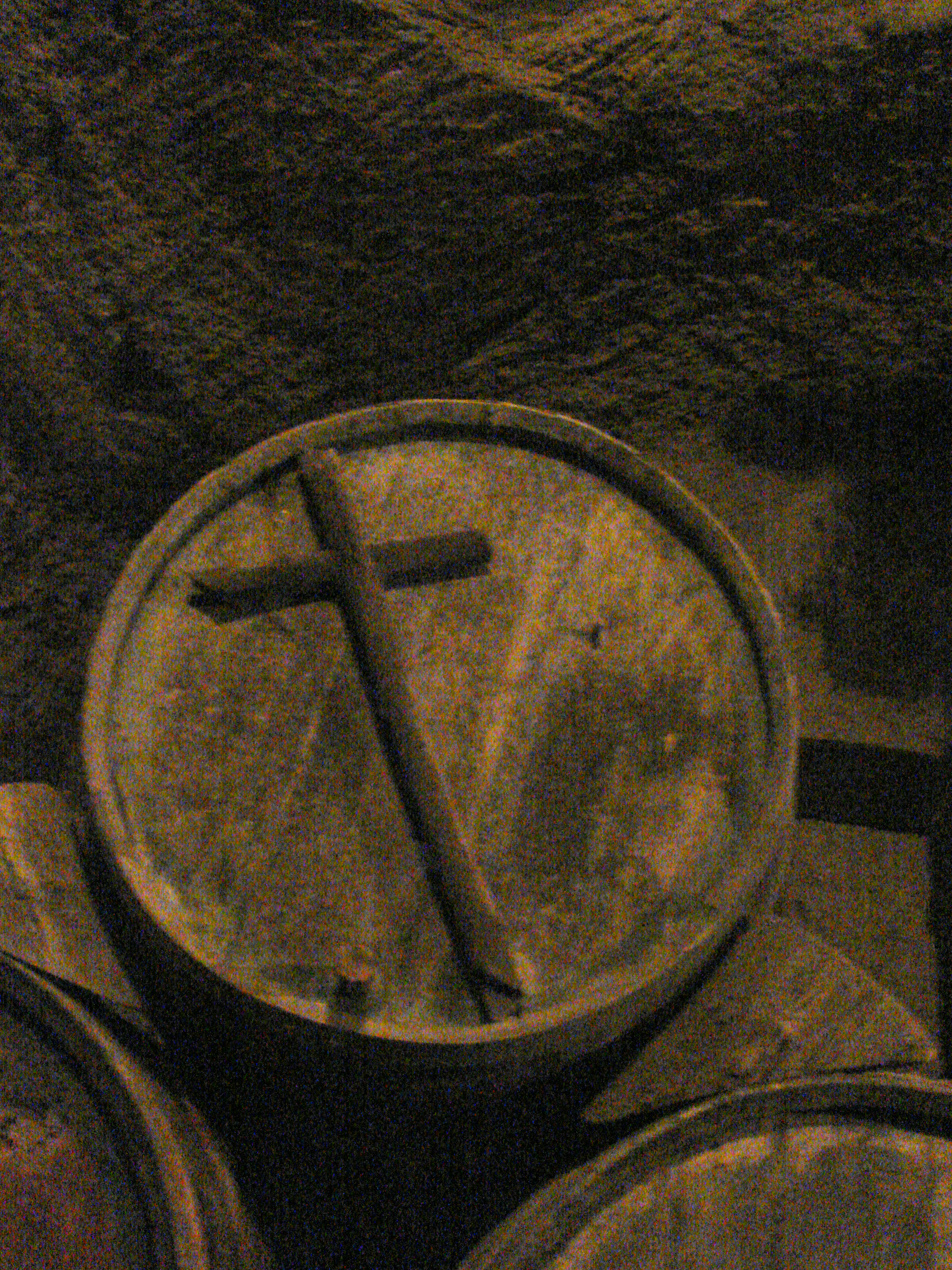
Bigolona is sometimes used in the production of vin santo wine, which spends a long time aging in barrels that are often specifically marked.

Today Bigolona is cultivated almost exclusively in the Valpolicella region and around the commune of Illasi in the province of Verona. There the grape is often used in the production of late-harvest dessert wines, including vin santo and passito style wines. While the grape can be made as a varietal under the Veneto IGT designation, it is most often blended with other local white grape varieties such as Garganega.

== Synonyms ==
Over the years, Bigolona has been known under a variety of synonyms including: Bigolara, Bigolona bianca, Bigolona Veronese, Sampagna and Smarzirola.
