= Prunesta =

Variety of grape

- Grape (Vitis)
- Color of berry skin: Noir
- Species: Vitis vinifera
- Also called: Uva Del Soldato, Ruggia, and other synonyms
- Origin: Italy
- Notable regions: Calabria
- Formation of seeds: Complete
- Sex of flowers: Hermaphrodite
- VIVC number: 9794

Prunesta is a rare native Italian red wine grape variety. According to Ian D'Agata in Native Wine Grapes of Italy: "It has a midium-sized, very stocky, pyramidal, winged bunch, with large, oval, blue-black berries." It is a component of 10 Calabrian IGT wines, primarily in the Province of Reggio Calabria and the Province of Crotone.

== Synonyms ==
Bermestia Nera, Bermestia Rossa, Bermestia Violacea, Bermestia Violata, Pergola Rossa, Pergolese Di Tivoli, Pergonesi Di Tivoli, Prunesta Di Ruovo, Prunesta Di Ruvo, Prunesta Nera, Prunesta Rossa, Prunesta Violacea, Prunestra Rosso Violacea, Uva D'inverno, Uva Del Soldato, Uva Roja, Uva Rossa Di Cagliari

== See also ==
- List of Italian grape varieties
