= Romagna Albana =

Wine variety

- Wine region
- Type: DOCG
- Year established: 1987
- Country: Italy
- Size of planted vineyards: 250 hectares (620 acres)
- Varietals produced: Albana (95%)
- Wine produced: 6,030 hectolitres (133,000 imp gal; 159,000 US gal)

Romagna Albana (also Albana di Romagna before 2011) is a white, still Italian wine based principally on the Albana grape variety produced in Bologna, Forlì-Cesena and Ravenna. It was awarded Denominazione di Origine Controllata (DOC) status in 1967, and promoted to Denominazione di Origine Controllata e Garantita (DOCG) in 1987, with a name change instituted in 2011.

== History ==
There is much history and legend associated with the Albana di Romagna area. One story from 435 AD concerns the daughter of Roman Emperor Theodosius I. She arrived in a small village on a white donkey, and the villagers were so overcome with her beauty that they offered her some of the area's sweet and excellent wine (Albana) from a simple terra cotta jug. Completely enamored of this delicious, unctuous nectar, Galla Placida exclaimed, "You should not drink this wine in such a humble container. Rather it should be drunk in gold (berti in oro) to render homage to its smoothness." From that day on, the village was called Bertinoro and the wine was drunk from refined goblets at the court of Ravenna.

This wine was also described in the 13th century by medieval wine writer Pietro de' Crescenzi as being "very strong and of noble taste, well suited for long maturation and at the same time quite subtle … the best of this type of grape can be had at Forlì and throughout the Romagna".

Today, Albana di Romagna's claim to fame is that it was the first of the area's white wines to receive its DOCG classification (in 1987). However, there has been controversy surrounding this ranking and it has been considered "a political response to pressure from Romagna's wine producers". Another factor which disputes its status is the maximum yield per hectare, currently standing at 140 quintals; this high limit appears to discredit the DOCG law for making quality wine.

Production is concentrated mainly around Spungone Romagnolo, extending from Bertinoro to the Imola hills, a strip of the Apennines that extends east from Bologna as far as the Adriatic Sea. The area’s terroir is an excellent home for the Albana variety: the hillside sites offer a mixture of rocky, limestone and chalk soils; and the hot, dry Mediterranean climate is tempered by cooling breezes from the Adriatic Sea, resulting in cooler summers and a wider diurnal temperature variation. This all encourages higher-quality wines. The best vineyards are located on the well-drained foothills of the Apennines.

== Characteristics ==
The DOCG covers four styles of Albana di Romagna: secco, amabile, dolce, and passito, with varying degrees of alcohol (11.5–15.5%). A sparkling version, Romagna Albana Spumante, can also be made but may only use a DOC classification. The Albana variety is fairly light bodied with good acidity and contains considerable residual sugar, resulting in its noteworthy ability to make a sweeter wine. It is usually produced in a dry style, with distinctive underlying peach and almond notes, a strong line of refreshing acidity and some complexity.

The passito is the area’s biggest star. Albana di Romagna may not be considered world class and the quality may be variable, but in the hands of expert wine producers who choose to keep their yields low, this wine can achieve distinction. Grapes are dried in on the vine, in small boxes, on wooden grates or using air indoors; vinification occurs in wooden barriques or in stainless steel. The passito version of Albana di Romagna must be available for sale by September 1 of the year following the harvest for the standard wine, and as a riserva by December 1. With its quince- and apricot-rich intensity, and nuances of magnolia, honey and spice, it is the only style that has a minimum aging time of ten months, or 13 for the riserva designation.

== Bibliography ==
- Anderson, Burton (2004). Italiens Weine 2004/2005. Hallwag, Gräfe und Unzer. p. 11. ISBN 3-7742-6365-5.
