= Uvalino =

Variety of grape

Uvalino is a red Italian wine grape variety that is grown in the Piedmont wine region of northwest Italy. While the name uvalino means "small berries", ampelographers believe that the name may be derived from uvario which in the local Piedmontese dialect was used to denote wine grapes that were primarily minor blending varieties.

In recent years, the high levels of the antioxidant resveratrol of Uvalino has brought attention to the grape due to its potential health benefits.

== History ==
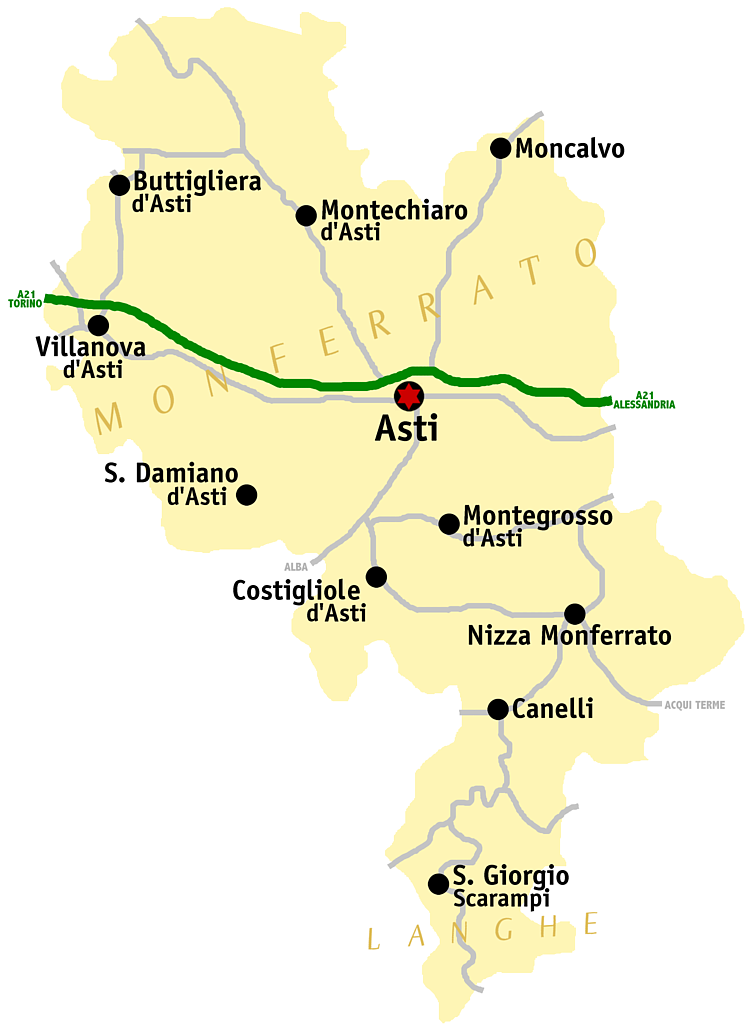
Uvalino has been historically associated with the province of Asti, particularly around the commune of Nizza Monferrato.

The first documented account of Uvalino was of the grape variety growing in the communes of Castelletto Molina and Nizza Monferrato in the province of Asti by botanist Giorgio Gallesio in 1831. In 2006, DNA analysis revealed that Uvalino has a likely parent-offspring relationship with the nearly extinct Piemontese grape Neretto di Marengo.

Uvalino, itself, was on the verge of extinction until the late 20th century when winemaker Mariuccia Borio was inspired by wine made by famous Barolo winemaker Renato Ratti from a small planting of Uvalino at his Villa Pattono estate in La Morra in the province of Cuneo. Reminded of a wine from her childhood, Borio began working with Ratti and the Asti extension of the Institute of Experimental Viticulture (Istituto Sperimentale per la Viticoltura) of Conegliano Veneto to revive plantings of the grape variety. By 2002, their efforts got Uvalino placement on the official registry of Italian grape varieties.

== Viticulture ==
Uvalino is a late-ripening grape variety that can be very robust and resistant to many viticultural hazards such as botrytis bunch rot. Its low-sensitivity to many late season hazards like fungal infections allows growers to give the grapes long "hang time" on the vine before harvest to achieve more ripe phenolics flavors.

== Wine regions ==
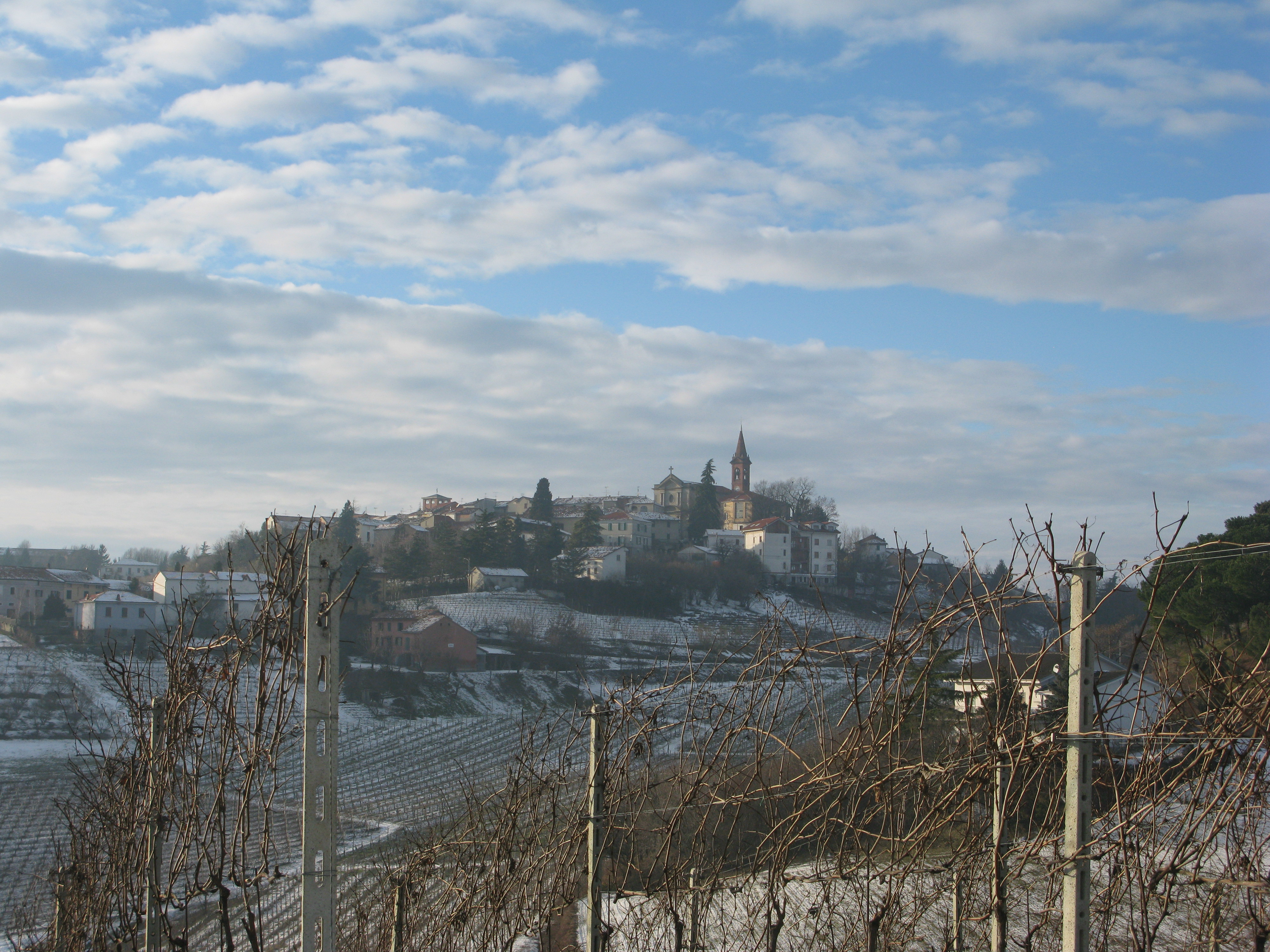
Vineyards in the Asti region of Piedmont where Uvalino is almost exclusively grown.

Being only added to the official registry of Italian grape varieties in 2002, there is not yet an official census count of how many plantings of Uvalino there are in Italy. However, ampelographers believe that the grape is almost exclusively grown in the Piedmont region.

== Styles ==
According to Master of Wine Jancis Robinson, as a varietal, Uvalino tends to produce full-bodied wines with noticeable tannins and acidity levels with aromas of sweet spices and red fruits.

== Synonyms ==
Over the years, Uvalino has been known under a variety of synonyms including: Cunaiola (in Canavese), Freisone (in Tortona), Lambrusca (in Roero) and Lambruschino (in Roero). However, the Vitis International Variety Catalogue (VIVC) currently does not recognize any official synonyms for Uvalino but does note that Uvalino is used as synonym for the Italian wine grape Pistolino and Uvalino nero is a synonym for Croatina.
