= Raboso (grape) =

Variety of grape

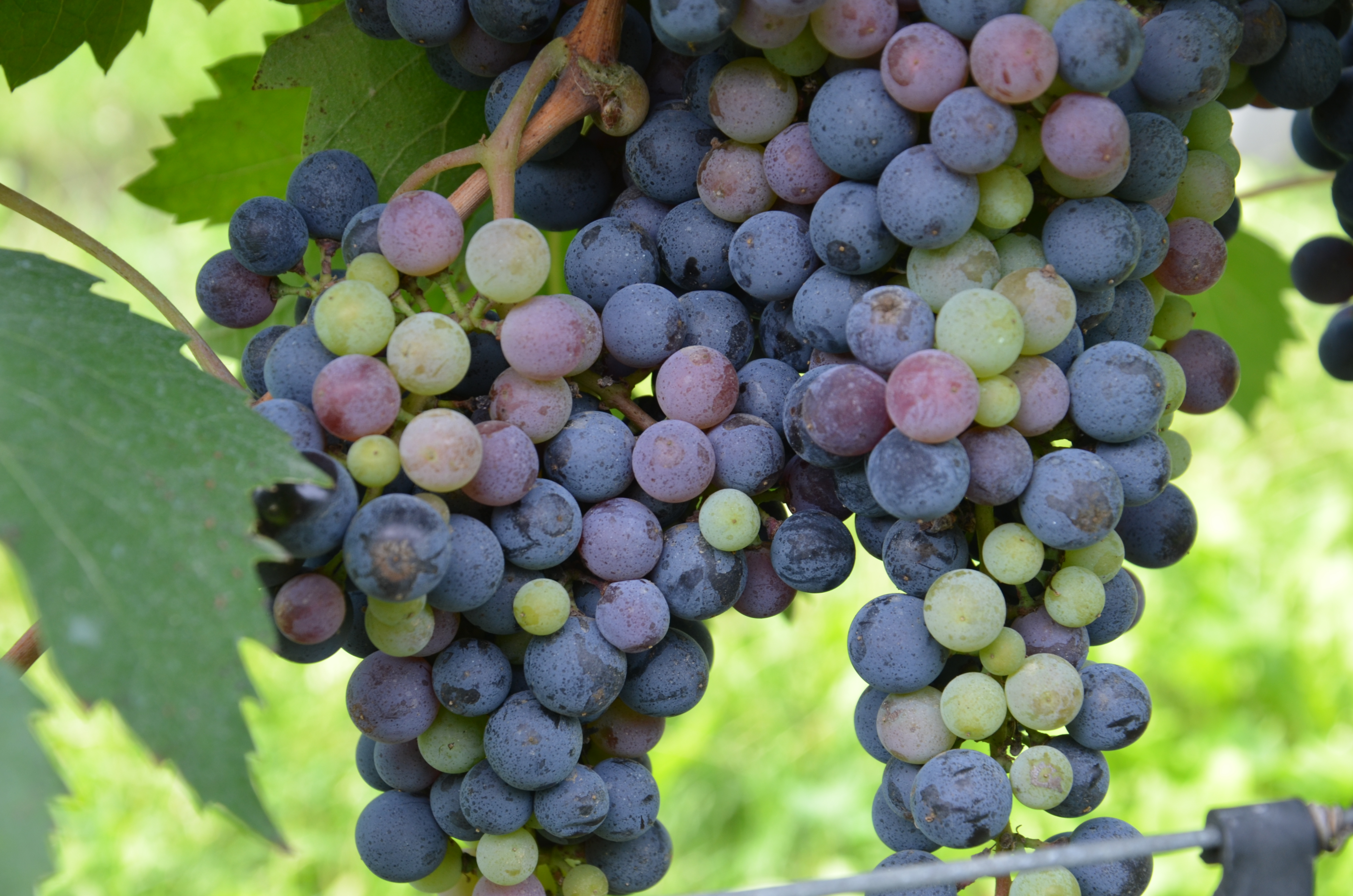
Raboso Grape vine

Raboso is a red wine grape grown primarily in the eastern part of Veneto. It is also called Raboso Piave, from the name of a river near where it is grown. It produces deep-colored wine, with notably high levels of tannin and medium alcohol content and high acid. The name raboxo in the native Venetian language means "angry", because angry is the sensation in the mouth when this wine is drunk young. Raboso was in the past the most cultivated grape variety of eastern Veneto; Venetian navigators called it vin de viajo, "wine of travel", because it was the most resistant to aging and transport. Its popularity decreased in the 20th century, and today the vineyards of Raboxo are just 1–2% of the total amount of vineyards in Veneto.

The vine ripens relatively quite late, producing good yields with high resistance to fungal disease and rot. The grape crossed with another Veneto wine grape, Marzemina bianca, to produce Raboso Veronese. It produces quite a large, tight, cylindrical bunch with one or two wings and a sturdy bunchstem. Its spheroid grape has a blue-black, very tough skin with good bloom. The flesh has a varietal, neutral flavour which is slightly meaty and sweet-acidulous-astringent. Each grape has two or three average-sized, pear-shaped seeds. This vigorous vine can have high yield. Optimal vinification requires appropriate maceration of juice and skins: this results in a full-bodied wine, acidic and tannic when young, ideal for laying down. Left to age in wooden barrels, it will gradually acquire a deep ruby colour with garnet tinges, a broad and full bouquet of wild violets with a concentrated note of morello cherry; the palate is dry, astringent. In food and wine pairing, it can go with furred and feathered game, red meat, grilled meats and well-matured cheeses.

== Relationship to other grapes ==
During a series of trials between 1930 and 1935, Raboso Piave was crossed with Black Muscat to create the red wine grape variety Manzoni Moscato.
