= Vespaiola =

Variety of grape

- Grape (Vitis)
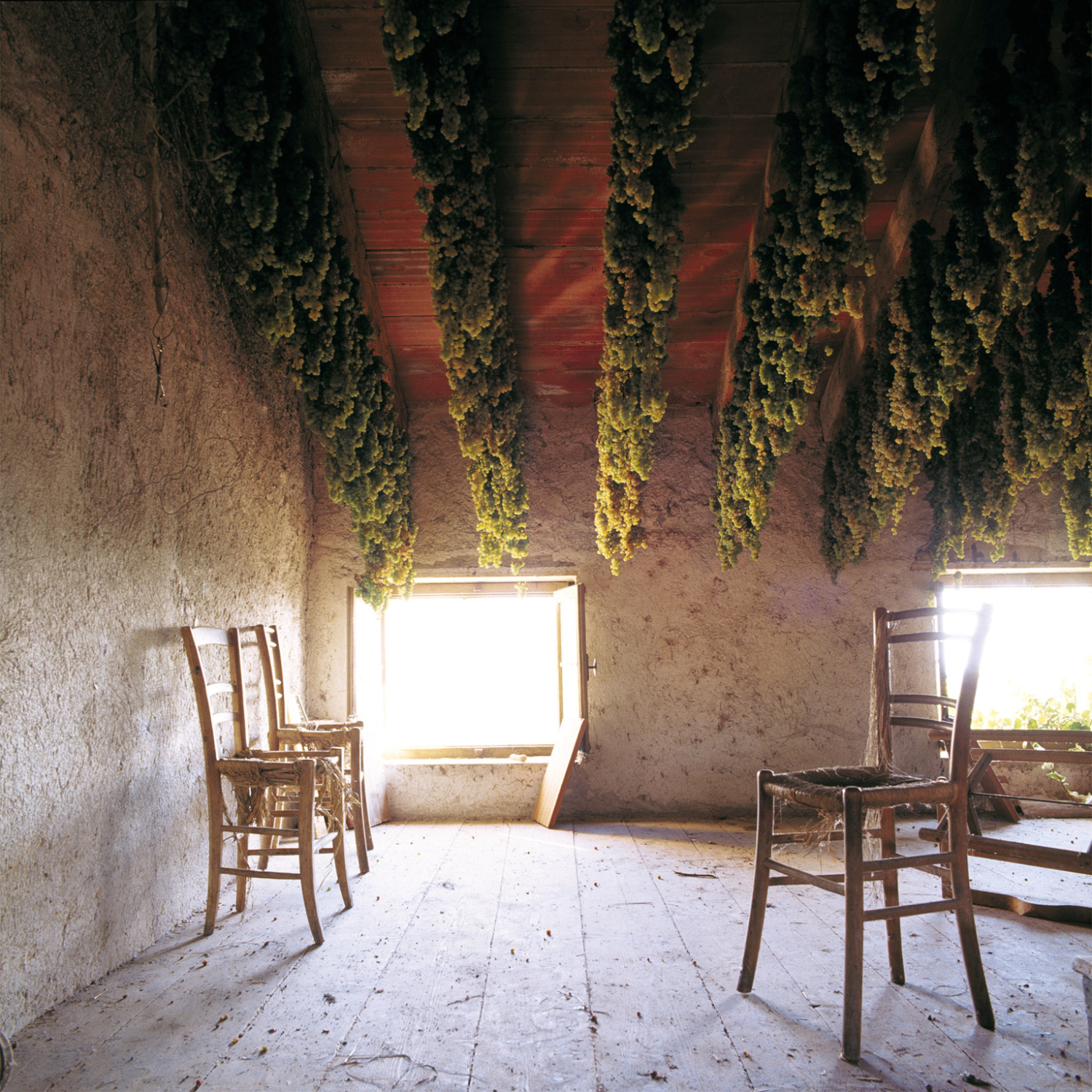
- Vespaiola grapes hung from the ceiling in a drying room to make a passito style wine
- Color of berry skin: Blanc
- Species: Vitis vinifera
- Also called: See list of synonyms
- Origin: Italy
- VIVC number: 13016

Vespaiola is a white Italian wine grape variety planted primarily in the Veneto region of northeastern Italy, where it is often dried to produce passito style dessert wines. Along with Friulano, Vespaiola is an important component in the Denominazione di origine controllata (DOC) white wine of Breganze produced in the province of Vicenza.

Vespaiola grapes ripen to high sugar levels and are used to produce sweet wines with a characteristic golden hue. In fact, the grapes of Vespaiola get so concentrated with sugars that the name Vespaiola comes from Vespa, in reference to wasps that are attracted to the sugary aromas in vineyards.

Despite its similar-sounding name, Vespaiola should not be confused with red Italian wine grape, Vespolina, which is grown in the Piedmont and Lombardy regions.

== Wine regions ==
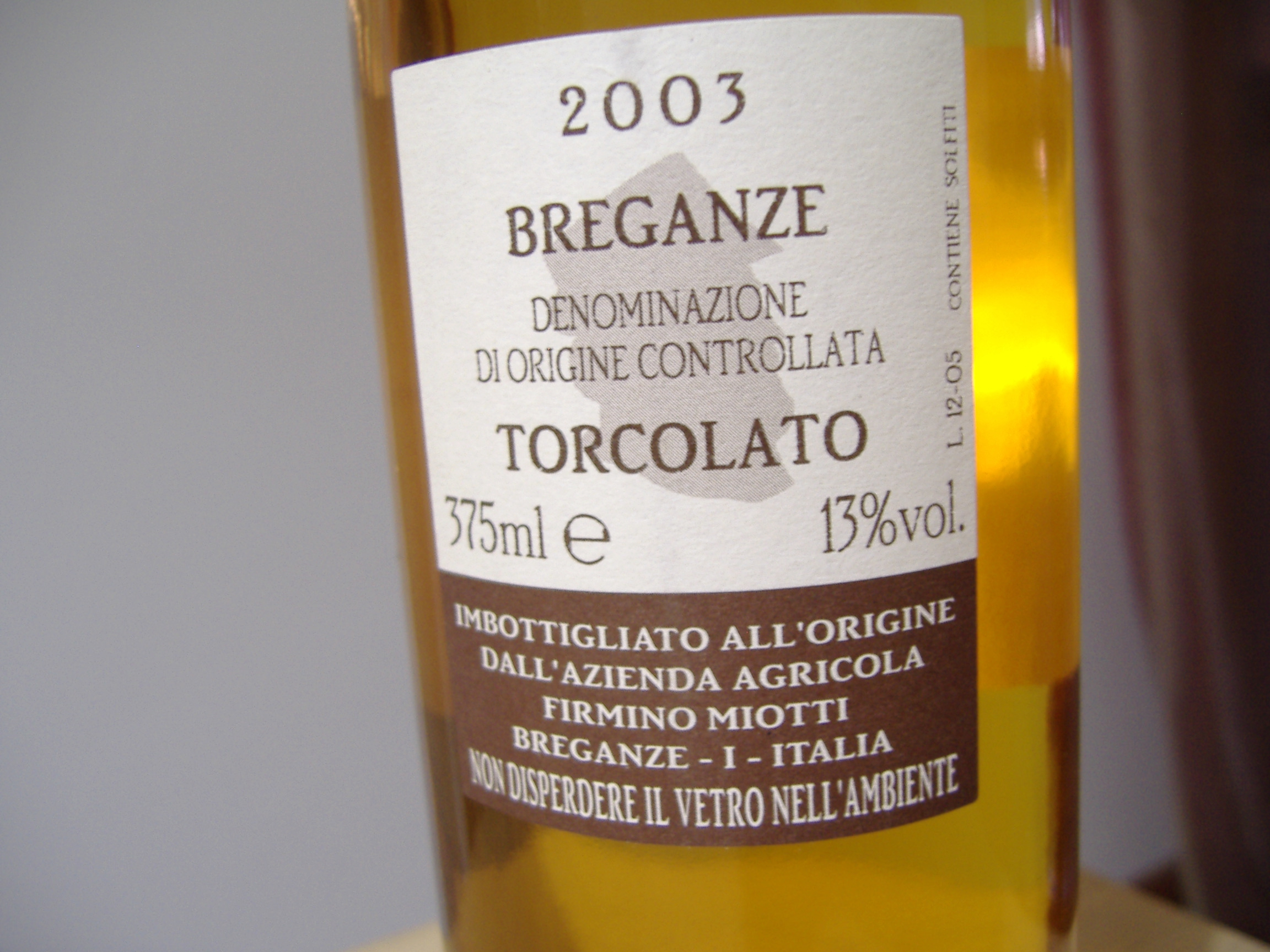
A Torcolato dessert style wine from Breganze made from Vespaiola.

The Breganze DOC, located in the foothills of the Alps, contains a significant number of plantings of Vespaiola where the grape can be included in the generic Breganze blend or produced in a varietal wine. To be included in the DOC wine, the grapes must be harvested up to a maximum yield 14 tonnes/hectare (13 tonnes for the varietal) with the finished wine fermented to a minimum alcohol level of 11% (11.5% for the varietal).

For the Breganze white blend, up to 15% Vespaiola is permitted to blended primarily with Friulano with Pinot bianco, Pinot grigio, Riesling Italico and Sauvignon blanc also potentially included in the blend. The varietal wine Vespaiola must be made entirely of the single variety, harvested to more limited yields and produced with a higher alcohol level. A superiore style is also permitted if the wine achieves at least a 12% alcohol level. When Vespaiola is used to produce a dessert style wine from partially dried grapes (a passito) it maybe labeled as Torcolato.

=== DOC regions ===
The following is a list of DOC wines, beyond Breganze, that include Vespaiola as a permitted grape variety, along with other grapes that may be included in the blend under varying percentages that are regulated under the DOC label.

- Bagnolo di Sopra DOC – Primarily Chardonnay, Sauvignon blanc and Friulano with up to 10% permitted to be Vespaiola and/or other local white grape varieties.
- Merlara DOC – Primarily Friulano with up to 50% permitted to be Vespaiola and/or other local white grape varieties.
- Vicenza DOC – Primarily Garganega with up to 50% permitted to be Vespaiola and/or other local white grape varieties.

== Viticulture and winemaking ==
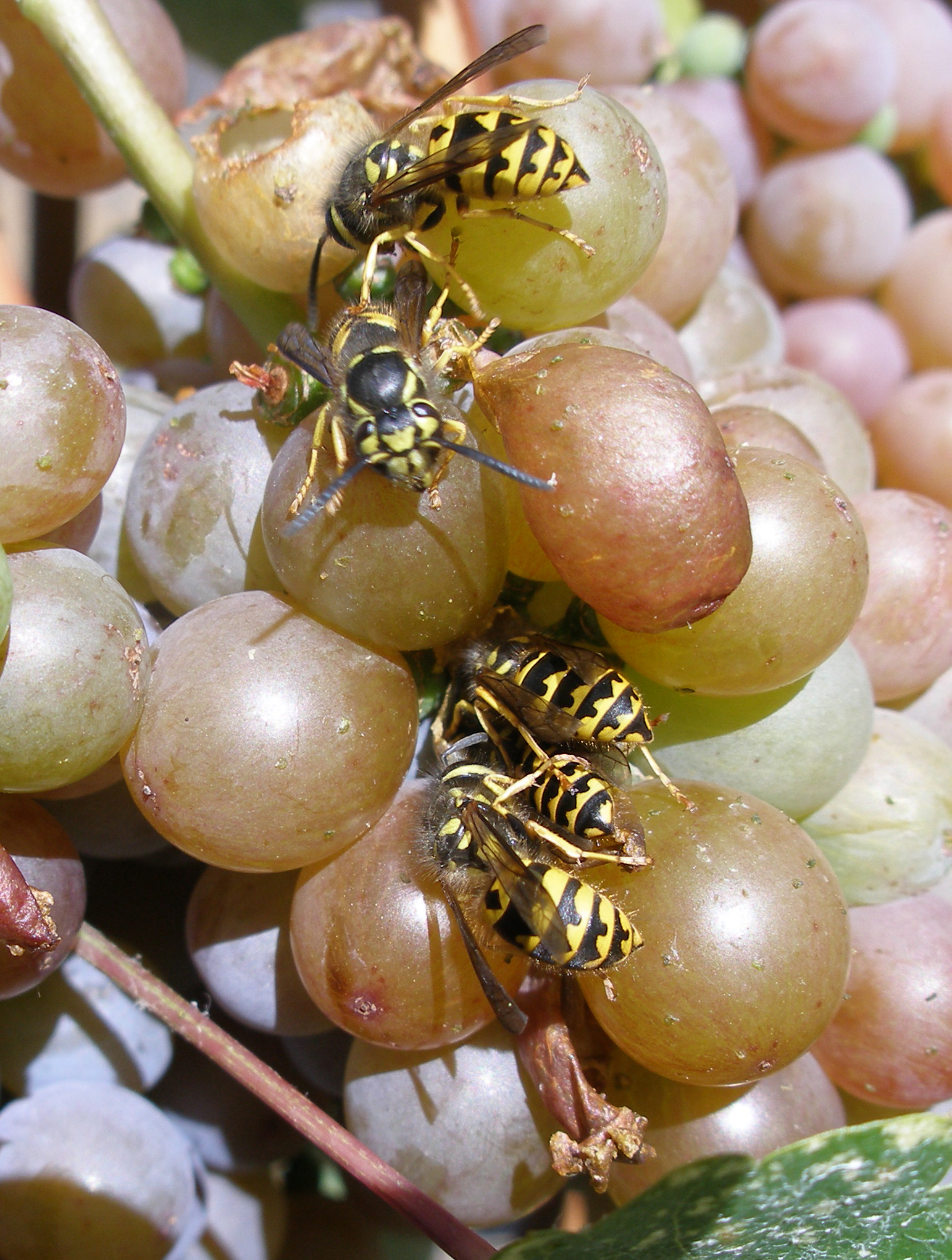
Vespaiola gets its name from the wasps (vespa) that are attracted to the ripening sugars in the grapes.

The name Vespaiola is derived from the Latin vespa and refers to the wasps that are attracted to the high sugar content in the grapes as they ripen late into the growing season. The wasps' presence can be considered a viticultural hazard due to not only their propensity to damage the grapes in order to get to the sweet pulp inside, but also the danger they may cause to vineyard workers in the area.

In vintages where the climate conditions are favorable, the grapes maybe left on the vine to desiccate and further concentrate the sugars well into January. They could also be harvested earlier and left to dry inside special drying rooms where they are may be hung from the ceilings or spread out on mats to dry.

Even with the long ripening periods and high sugar concentrations, the Vespaiola grape can still maintain a relatively high level of acidity that can help balance the sweetness in the resulting wines. After fermentation, some producers will age the wines in oak barrels.

== Wine styles ==
The passito styles of Vespaiola are characterized by a golden color with aromas of apricots, honeysuckles and spice that can be a byproduct of aging in oak. The naturally high acidity of the grapes can help balance the high sugar content producing what wine expert Oz Clarke describes as "one of Italy's finest sweet wines." In recent years, producers in Breganze have experimented with producing Sauternes-style wine from Vespaiola, Friulano and other white grapes that have been infected with Botrytis cinerea.

While Vespaiola is often used to produce sweet dessert wines, it can also be fermented to dryness where it usually produces a light-bodied wines with high acidity and very little of the aroma notes that tend to characterize the grape's sweeter incarnations.

== Synonyms ==
Over the years Vespaiola and its wines have been known under various synonyms including Bresparola, Bresparola Bianca, Orisi bianca, Uva Vespera, Vespaia, Vespaiolo, Vespajola, Vespajuola Di Bassano, Vesparola, and Vespera.
