= Catanese nero =

Variety of grape

Catanese nero is a red Italian wine grape variety that is predominantly grown in Sicily. While ampelographers believe that grape likely originated in the shadow of Mount Etna in province of Catania on the east coast of the island, today it is mostly grown in the northwestern provinces of Agrigento, Palermo and Trapani. A minor blending variety used in rosé production, the grape is not currently permitted for use in any Denominazione di origine controllata classified wines.

== History ==
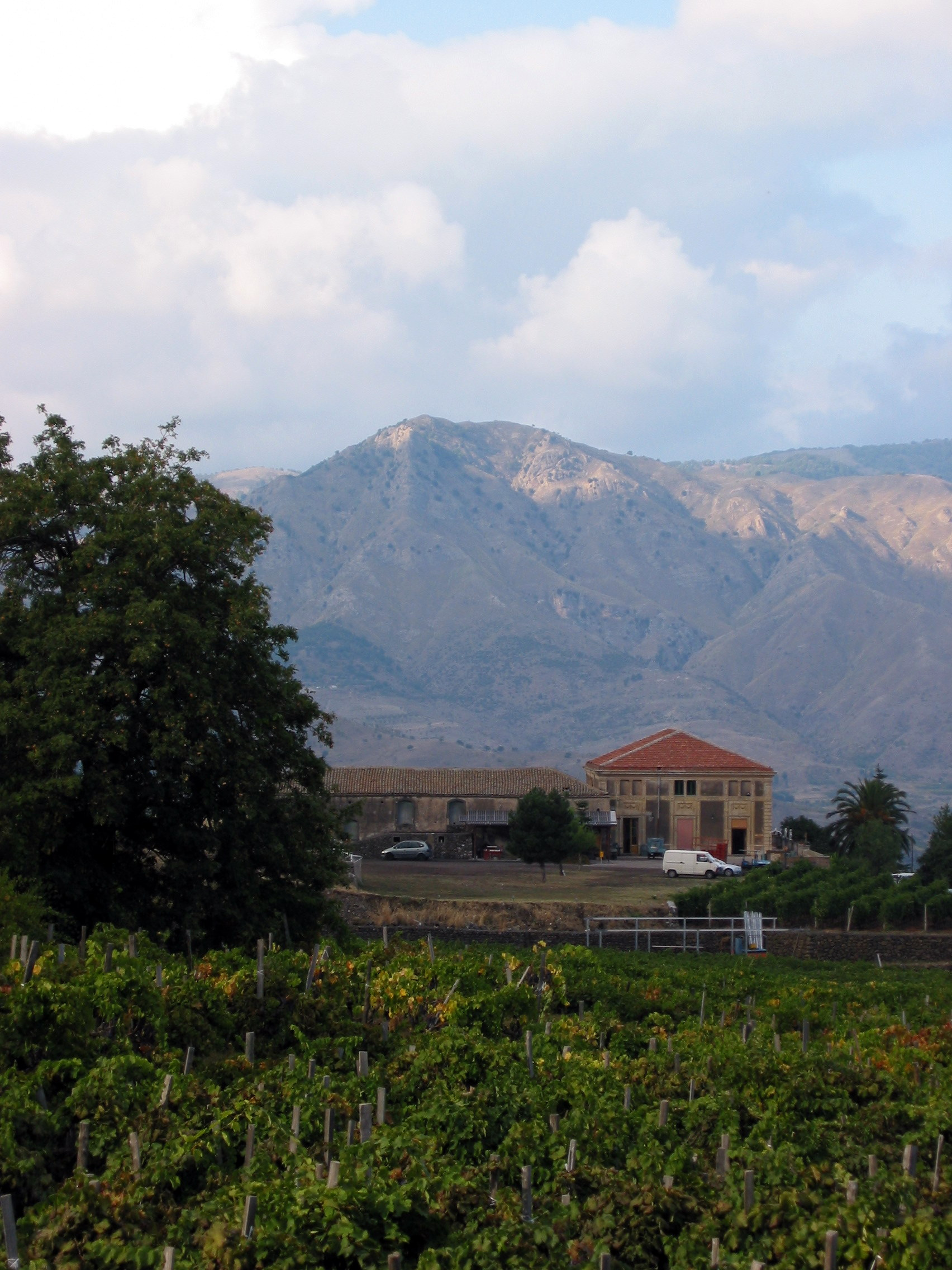
Ampelographers believe that Catanese nero likely originated in the province of Catania (pictured).

Ampelographers believe that Catanese nero is indigenous to Sicily with the grape's name suggesting that the province of Catania, located on the east coast near of the island. Though the grape likely originated here, today it is hardly found in Catania and throughout the island plantings of the variety have declined due to the grapes low resistance to a number of grape diseases.

== Viticulture ==
Catanese nero is a mid to late ripening grape variety. The vine is susceptible to many viticultural hazards such as the fungal infections of powdery and downy mildew. Catanese nero's poor disease resistance is a contributing factor to the grape's declining numbers in Sicily.

== Wine regions ==
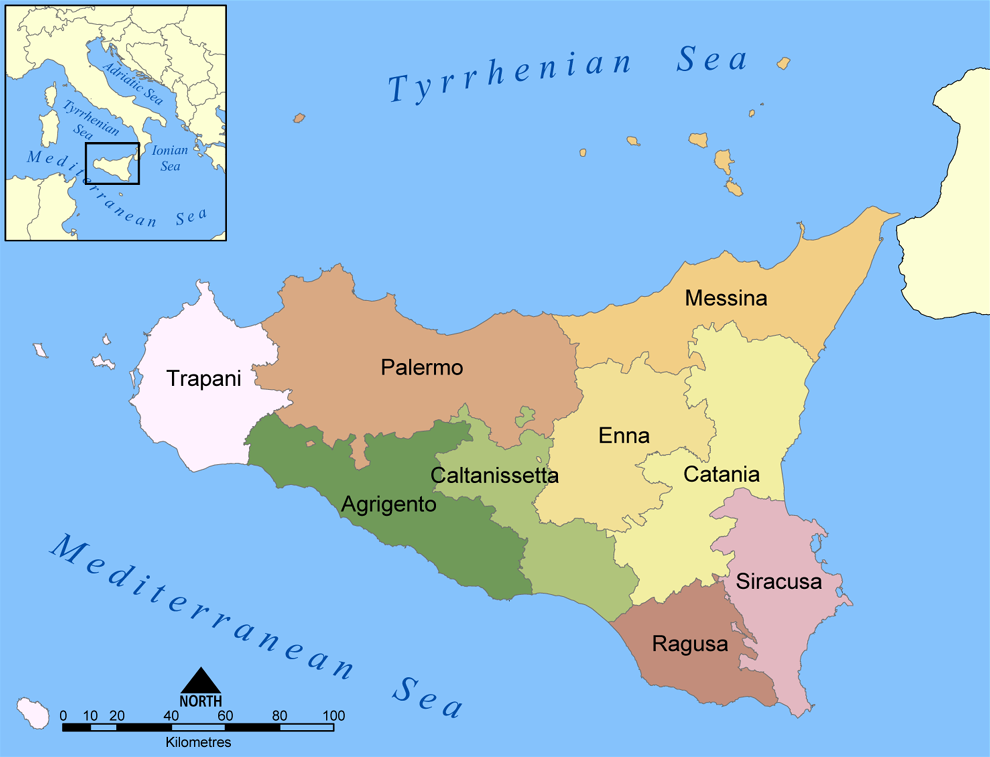
Today Catanese nero is found mostly in the western provinces of Agrigento, Trapani and Palermo.

In 2000 there were 80 hectares (198 acres) of Catanese nero in Sicily with plantings spread out over the western provinces of Palermo, Trapani and Agrigento. While not permitted in any DOC wines, the grape is used as a blending variety for non-DOC rosés.

== Synonyms ==
Over the years Catanese nero has been known under a variety of synonyms including: Vespalora and Vesparola.
