= Verdiso =

Variety of grape

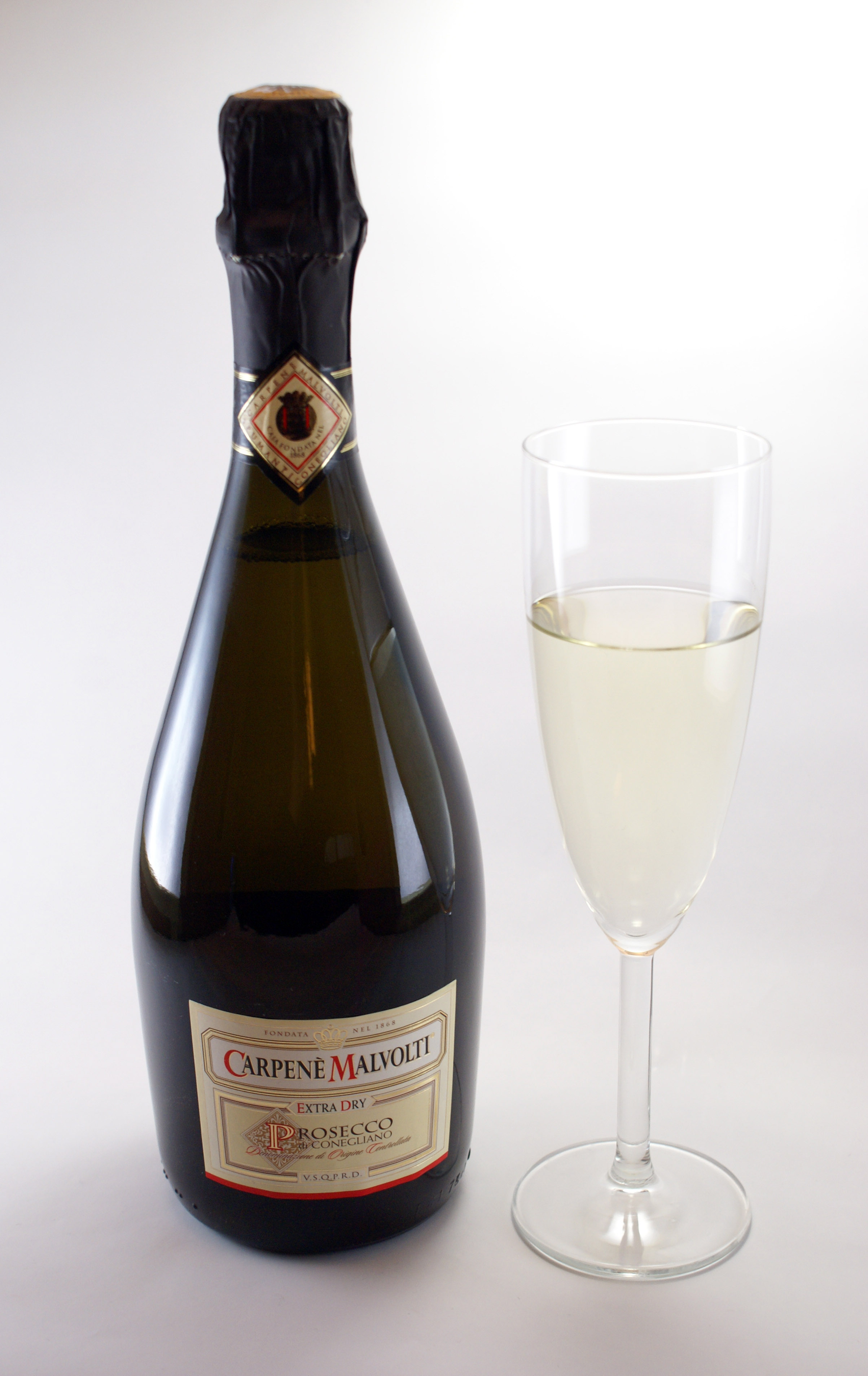
Verdiso is a minor blending component in the Italian sparkling wine Prosecco.

Verdiso is a white Italian wine grape variety grown primarily in province of Treviso in the Veneto wine region of northeast Italy. It is a permitted variety in the sparkling wine Denominazione di origine controllata DOC of Prosecco located north of the city of Treviso along the Piave river.

== DOC rules ==
To be used in Prosecco, Verdiso must be harvest to a yield no greater than 12 tonnes/hectare. The wine must be at least 85% Glera with Verdiso permitted to fill in the remaining 15% of the blend along with Chardonnay, Pinot gris and Pinot blanc. The finished wine must attain a minimum alcohol level of 10.5%. Separate bottlings of Prosecco that contain Verdiso may be labeled as Superiore di Cartizze, provided the wine reaches a minimum alcohol level of 11% and is made exclusively from grapes grown in vineyards on the hill of Cartizze, which is at an altitude of around 1,000 feet.

== Synonyms ==
Over the years Verdiso has been known under a variety of synonyms including: Groppeta, Pedevendia, Perduti Perevenda, Peverenda, Verdia, Verdia de Campagna, Verdia Bianca di Conegliano, Verdiga, Verdiger, Verdisa, Verdisa bianca Trevignana, Verdisa Grossa, Verdisco, Verdise, Verdise Bianca, Verdisio, Verdiso Gentile, Verdiso Zentil, Verdisone, Verdiza and Verdisot.
