= Rovello bianco =

Variety of grape

Rovello bianco or Greco Muscio or Aciniell’ is a white Italian wine grape variety that is grown in the Campania region of southern Italy. While the grape has been described in wine literature since 1875, the variety was on the verge of extinction until a collaboration by the University of Naples Federico II and University of Palermo along with a local wine grower in Taurasi help revive the variety with new plantings in 2003.

== History and relationship with other grapes ==
The province of Avellino highlighted within Campania in southern Italy where Rovello bianco has been growing since at least the 19th century.

Rovello bianco was first described growing in the Campanian province of Avellino in 1875 where it was locally known as Greco Muscio. Despite the similarities in synonyms, DNA profiling in the early 21st century has shown that Rovello bianco has no known genetic relationship with the either the white or dark berried Greco grapes or any of the other Italian varieties (such as Maceratino, Grechetto, Pignoletto, Fortana and Erbaluce) that share Greco as a synonym.

Like many Italian varieties, the phylloxera epidemic of the late 19th century followed by the political and economic turmoil of the 20th century World Wars saw a dramatic decrease in plantings that almost lead to the variety's extinction. But a collaboration between the Universities of Palermo and Naples Federico II along with the help of a local Taurasi wine grower lead to new plantings of Rovello bianco in 2003.

== Wine regions ==
Rovello bianco is found almost exclusively in the province of Avellino in Campania. In the communes of Taurasi, Bonito and Mirabella Eclano centenarian old vine plantings of the variety still exist and are used in commercial wine production.

== Styles ==
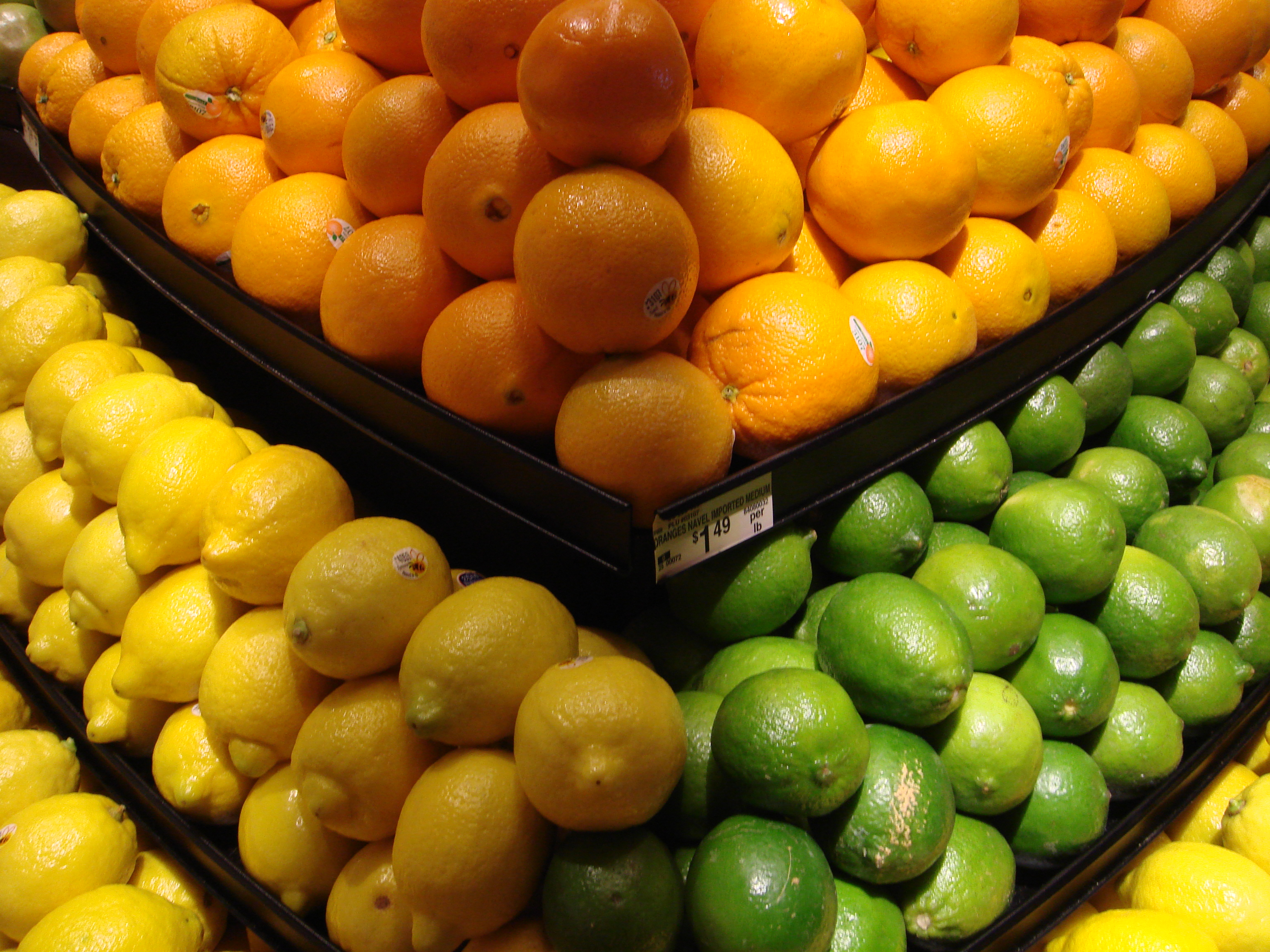
Varietal examples of Rovello bianco are sometimes described as having a "green citrus fruit" note.

According to Master of Wine Jancis Robinson, varietal examples of Rovello bianco (also known as Grecomusc) tend to have high levels of acidity with aroma notes of green citrus fruit and ash.

== Synonyms ==
Over the years, Rovello bianco has been known under a variety of synonyms including: Roviello, Rovello, Greco Muscio and Grecomusc.
