= Albana (grape) =

Variety of grape

- Grape (Vitis)
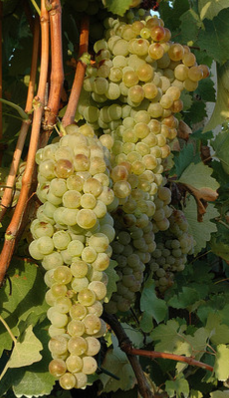
- Color of berry skin: Blanc
- Species: Vitis vinifera
- Also called: See list of synonyms
- Origin: Italy
- Notable regions: Emilia-Romagna
- Notable wines: Albana di Romagna
- VIVC number: 224

Albana is a white Italian wine grape planted primarily in the Emilia-Romagna region.

The wine made from the grape, Albana di Romagna, was first awarded DOCG status (Denominazione Origine Controllata e Garantita) in 1987. The grape produces deeply colored wines and could be related to Greco di Tufo.

== History ==
The history of this grape variety is unclear and confused with legends; it is believed that it was introduced to the region by the ancient Romans. The name Albana refers to the colour of the grapes (Albus = white in Latin).

In the 13th century Pier de' Crescenzi in his famous Treatise on Agriculture, describes Albana as "a powerful wine with an excellent taste, but at the same time easy to be preserved". Also in the 13th century, agricultural writer Petrus di Crescentiis mentions the grapes used in wine being produced in the Emilia-Romagna region. In the 18th century, an agronomist from Bologna, Vincenzo Tamara, mentioned this grape variety.

== Pedigree ==
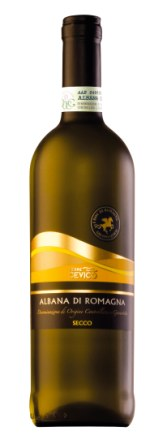
A bottle of Albana di Romagna

An Italian study published in 2008 using DNA typing showed a close genetic relationship between Garganega on the one hand and Albuela and several other grape varieties on the other hand. It is therefore possible that Garganega is one of the parents of Albuela, however, since the parents of Garganega have not been identified, the exact nature of the relationship could not be conclusively established.

== Synonyms ==
Albana is also known under the synonyms Albana a Grappo Longo, Albana a Grappolo Fitto, Albana a Grappolo Lungo, Albana a Grappolo Rado o Gentile, Albana dell'Istria (?), Albana della Forcella, Albana di Bertinoro, Albana di Bologna, Albana di Forli, Albana di Gatteo, Albana di Lugo, Albana di Montiano, Albana di Pesaro, Albana di Romagna, Albana di Terra Del Sole, Albana Gentile, Albana Gentile di Faenza, Albana Gentile di Ravenna, Albana Grossa, Albano, Albanone, Albuelis, Biancame Sinalunga, Forcella, Forcellata, Forcellina, Forcelluta, Raccia Pollone, Ribona, Riminese, and Sforcella.

There is also a rare Spanish variety called Albana.

Albana is also used as a synonym of the grape varieties Albula, Elbling, and Tempranilla.
