= Marzemino =

Variety of grape

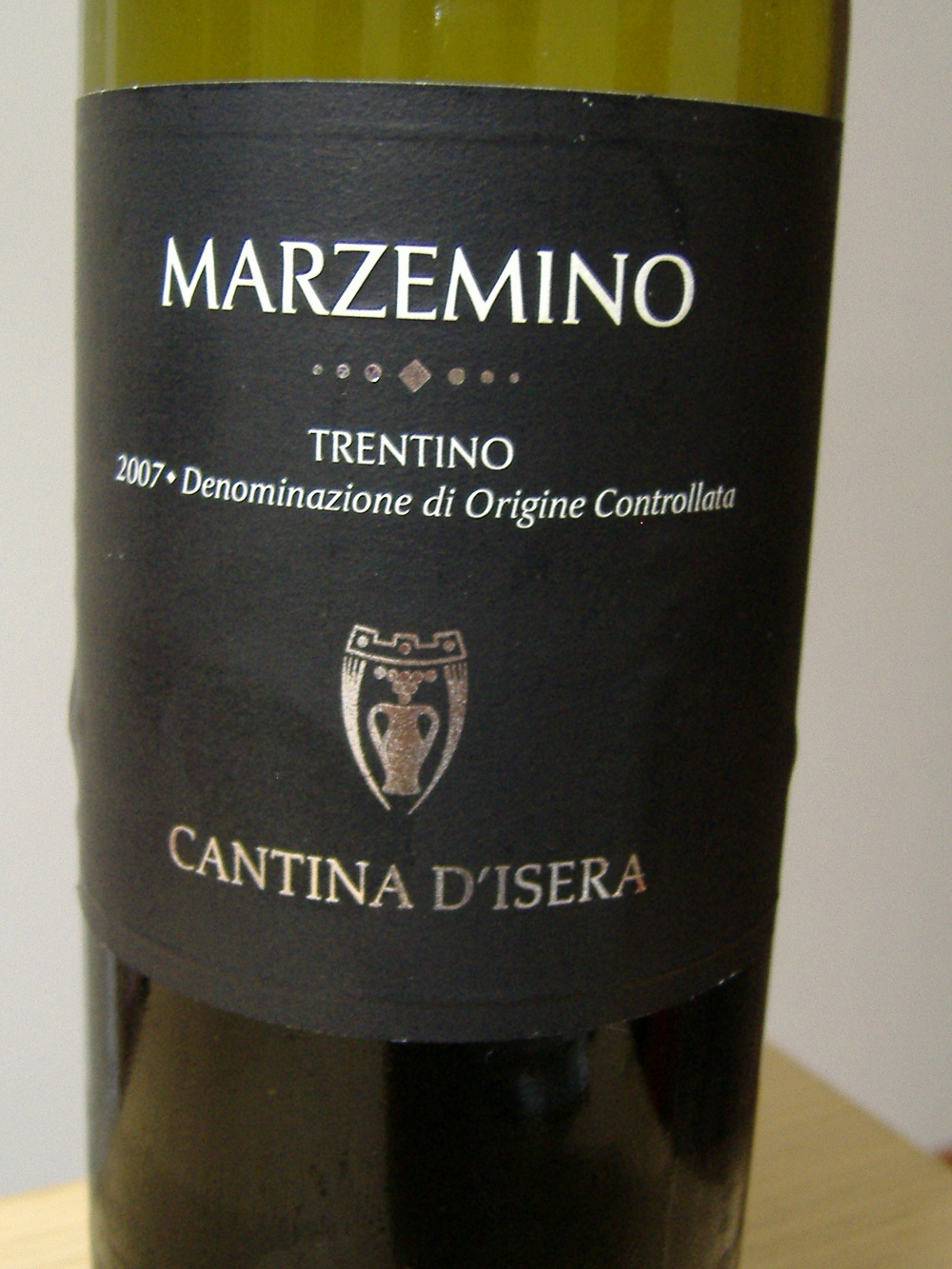
A varietal Marzemino from Trentino

Marzemino is a red Italian wine grape variety that is primarily grown around Isera, south of Trentino. The wine is most noted for its mention in the opera Don Giovanni, the music for which was composed by Wolfgang Amadeus Mozart ("Versa il vino! Eccellente Marzimino!"). The vine ripens late and is susceptible to many grape diseases, including oidium. Wine produced from the grape has a characteristic dark tint and light plummy taste.

Ampelographers have long theorized that the grape originated in northern Italy. Recent DNA profiling conducted at the research facility in San Michele all'Adige revealed Marzemino to have a parent-offspring relationship with the grapes Marzemina bianca in the Veneto, Refosco dal Peduncolo Rosso and Teroldego, from Friuli-Venezia Giulia and Trentino respectively, which gives further evidence to its likely origins in this region.

== Wine regions ==
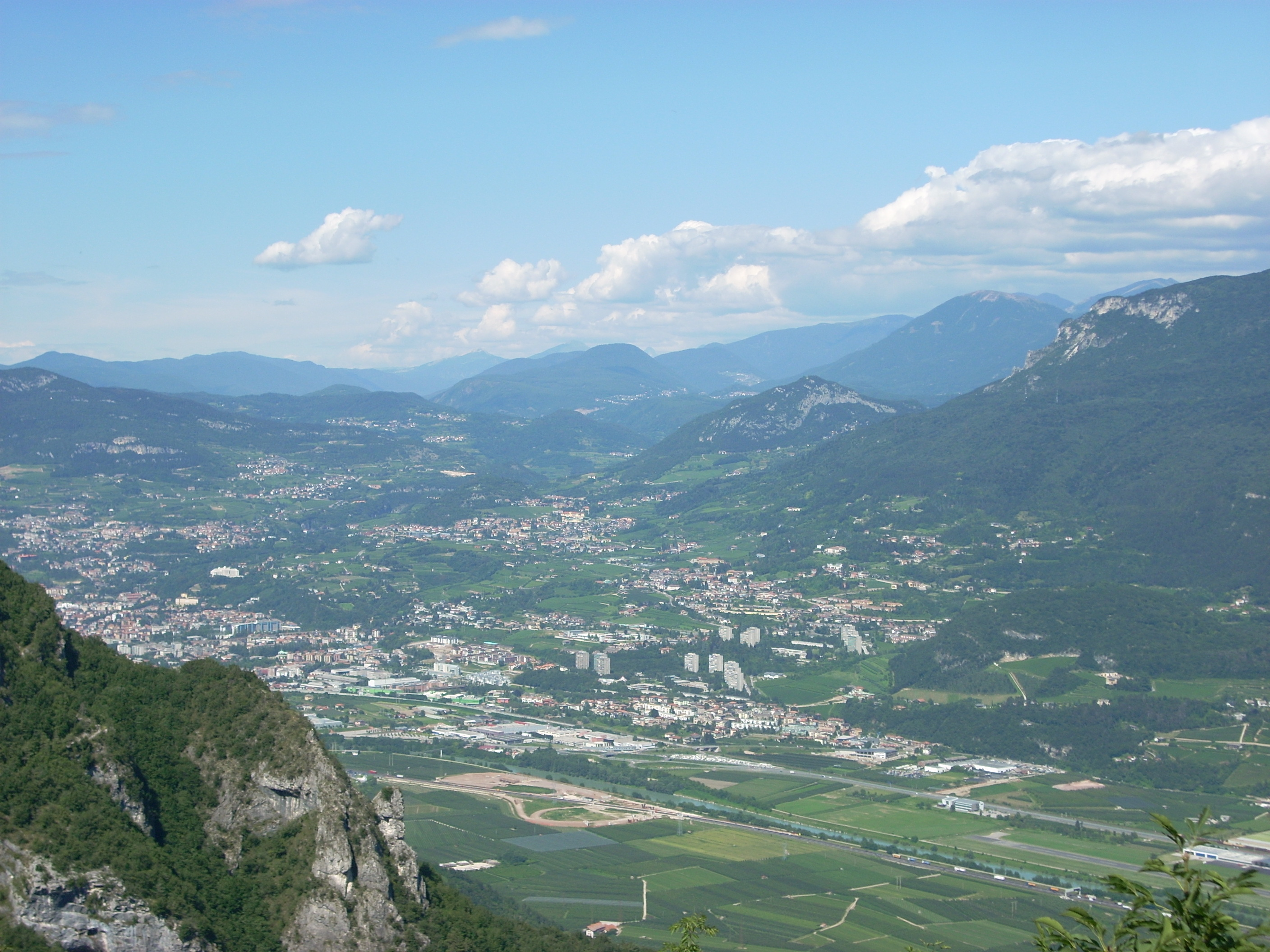
The Trentino region where Marzemino is grown.

Marzemino is found throughout northern Italy most notably in the Lombardia, Trentino, Veneto and Friuli-Venezia Giulia wine region. In Lombardy it is often used as a blending grape, most often partnering with Barbera, Groppello, Merlot or Sangiovese. In Trentino, it is often made as a varietal wine. While it is believed to have played a minor role in the history of Chianti, today it is rarely seen in Tuscany.

== Viticulture and winemaking ==
Marzemino is very susceptible to various fungal diseases and can be prone to high yields and over cropping. The vine requires a long growing season and ripens late. Marzemino can produce light wines with lively acidity that can be slightly sparkling. In cooler climates, the acidity can come across as grass with light cherry fruit flavors. Some sweet passito examples of Marzemino, often blended with other grapes, can also be found throughout northern Italy.

== In art ==
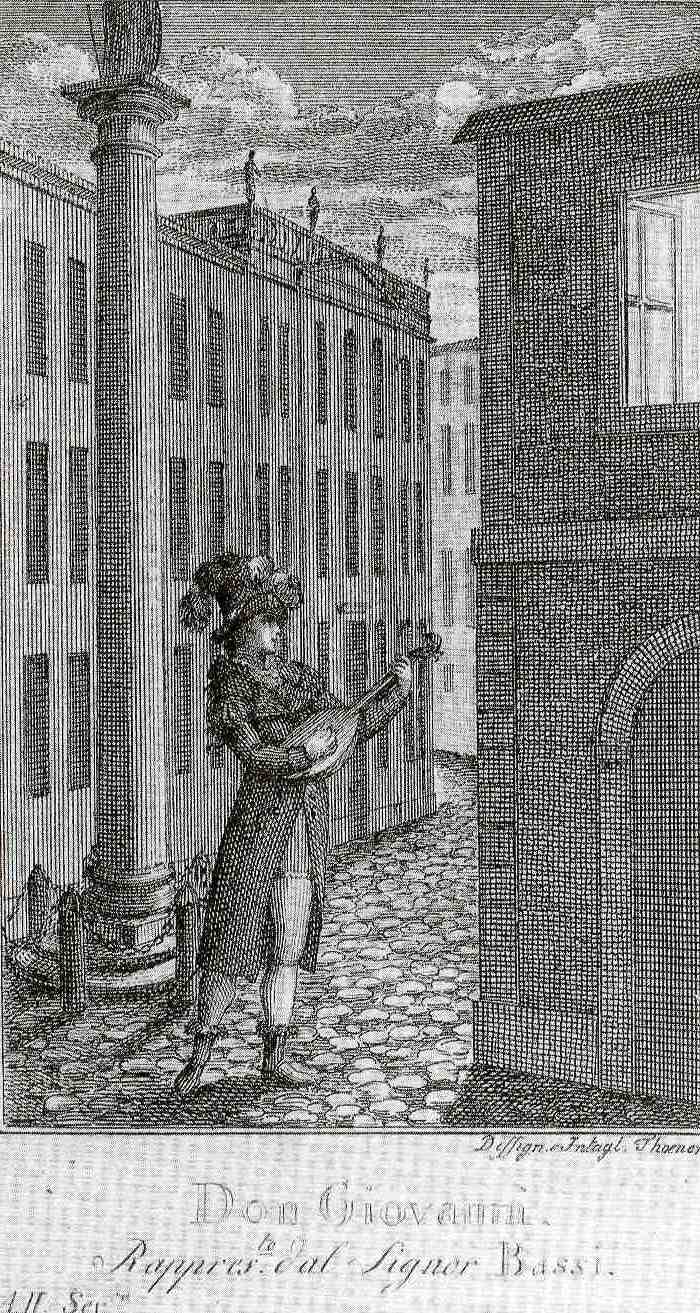
In the opera Don Giovanni, the title character calls out for a glass of Marzimino in the final banquet scene just before his deliverance into hell.

In the opera Don Giovanni, the titular character Don Giovanni calls out for a glass of Marzimino just before his deliverance into hell.

== Synonyms ==
Marzemino is known under a variety of synonyms throughout Italy. These include Balsamina nera, Barzemin, Bassamino, Berzemino Calopico, Bossamino, Magnacan, Marsemina, Marzamino, Marzemin, Marzemino d'Isera, Marzemino gentile, Marzemino Padovano, Merzemina and Uva Tedesco.
