= Andrea Matteucci =

Convicted Italian serial killer

- Born: 24 April 1962 (age 64); Turin, Italy
- Other names: "The Monster of Aosta" "Mister Hyde"
- Conviction: Murder
- Penalty: 28 years imprisonment and 3 years in a mental institution

Details
- Victims: 4
- Span of crimes: 1980–1995
- Country: Italy
- State: Aosta
- Date apprehended: 26 June 1995

Andrea Matteucci (born 24 April 1962), known as The Monster of Aosta (Il mostro di Aosta, in Italian), is an Italian criminal and serial killer who committed four murders in the 1980s and 1990s. He is the only Aosta Valley serial killer.

== Biography ==
Matteucci was born in Turin. His father, a worker with a criminal record for theft and receiving stolen goods, abandoned the family the year his son was born. His mother, Maria Pandiscia, left Matteucci in the custody of her sister Lina, in Foggia. At the age of 5, he moved with his mother to Aosta, to a religious institute where he lived until he was 9 years old. When questioned about his mother, Matteucci said: "She was a prostitute and she let me attend meetings with her clients. I hate women who get paid to be with men." At age 14, he tried to rob the butcher's shop where he worked, but a week later he confessed to the act. From 14 to 18 he remained in the community, subsequently leaving to work as a mechanic in Quart.

== Murders ==
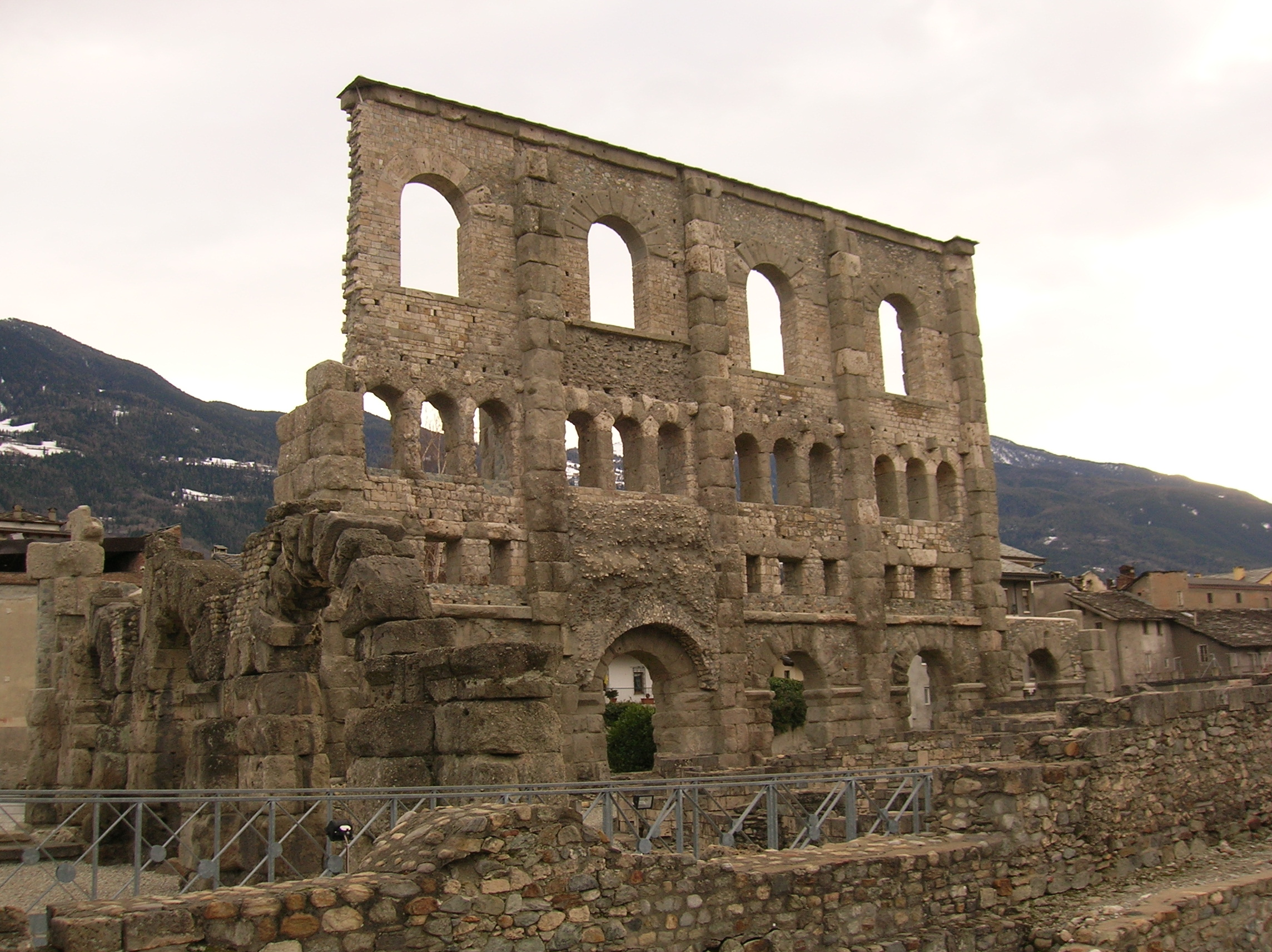
The Roman Theatre of Aosta, site of the 30 April 1980 murder

On the evening of 30 April 1980, when he left home, Matteucci met the merchant Domenico Raso at the Roman Theatre of Aosta. The man, secretly a homosexual, made sexual advances, and Matteucci killed him with a boy scout's knife. Raso had a family, and this led Matteucci to believe that he had done the right thing because "a man can not do certain things": his mental state was altered, believing that those who have family and engage in extramarital sexual acts do not deserve to live.

Matteucci was not discovered by the investigators and a few months after the crime he left for military service, during which he asked to enter the Folgore in Livorno. He left in 1983, with the rank of major corporal. In the same year, he got married and settled in Villeneuve, where he found a job as a shop assistant in a grocery store. In 1987, he had his first child and started working as a stonemason, first under various firms and then in his own workshop in Arvier. Meanwhile, his relationship with his wife began to deteriorate.

One evening in 1992, Matteucci met Turin prostitute Daniela Zago in Brissogne. The two had a quarrel while having sex, resulting in Matteucci shooting her in the head. Zago did not die immediately and asked Matteucci to take her to the hospital; he pretended to accept her plea, before taking her to an isolated location where he shot her in the head again, killing her. He then buried the corpse not far from the crime scene, in Arvier. After a month, fearing that the remains could be discovered, he dug them up and burned them at a landfill.

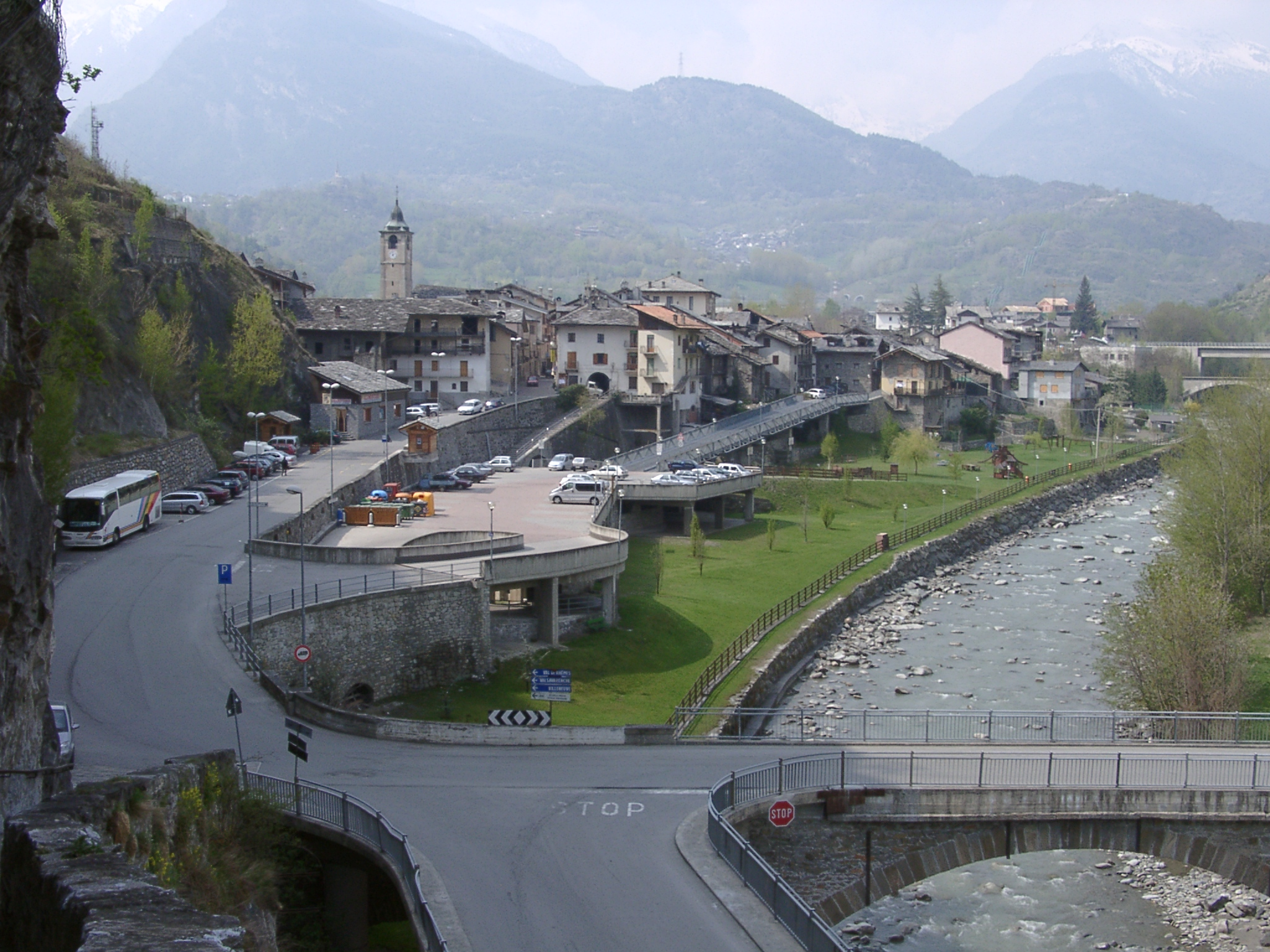
Villeneuve and the bridge over the Dora Baltea from which the ashes of prostitute Clara Omoregbee were thrown

In 1994, he met the Nigerian prostitute Clara Omoregbee in Chambave, engaging in sexual intercourse with her near Arnad. Not satisfied with the performance, Matteucci argued with her, hit the woman with his fists and killed her by shooting her twice, once in the head. After this, he had sex with her corpse. Back home, he dissected the corpse with a kitchen knife, after having burnt the remains in Arvier, throwing them into the Dora Baltea river near Villeneuve.

On 10 September 1994, while searching for victims in Nus, Matteucci met prostitute Lucy Omon and took her home. After having sex with her, he promised to take her back to Nus by car; instead, he took her to Arvier, to his old stonemason's workshop, where he tried to suffocate her with a pillow and a rag. Omon managed to escape from the car.

In 1995, he was convicted of car theft. Taking advantage of the benefit that he was not incarcerated, but it was imposed on him that he had an obligation to sign in Saint-Pierre and being forbidden to move outside of the perimeter between Arvier and Aosta. On 12 May 1995, he killed Albanian prostitute Albana Dakovi. After having sexual intercourse with her, Matteucci took her to Arnad, where he killed her by hitting her with a wrench and then stabbing her. He then hid the body in his van, with which he then went to Saint-Pierre to sign the register. Like the previous victims, Dakovi's remains were burned.

== Arrest and conviction ==
Dakovi's pimp sent an anonymous letter to the Pont-Saint-Martin barracks where he claimed to have seen the girl enter into an Iveco Daily van, also writing down the license plate number. On 26 June 1995, Matteucci was arrested in connection with the disappearance but denied killing Dakovi. The next day, when he was questioned again, he admitted to killing her, immediately confessing to the other murders as well.

During the trial, the psychiatric examination to which he was subjected declared Matteucci "socially dangerous" and partially incapable of understanding and wanting. On 16 April 1996, he was sentenced to 28 years imprisonment and 3 years in a judicial psychiatric hospital by the Court of Assizes of Aosta. He left prison in March 2017 at the age of 55, entering a psychiatric health facility.

== Victims ==
- Domenico Raso, killed in Aosta in 1980
- Daniela Zago, killed in Brissogne in 1982
- Clara Omoregbee, killed in Arnad in 1994
- Lucy Omon, attempted murder in 1994
- Albana Dakovi, killed in Arnad in 1995

== See also ==
- List of serial killers by country
