= Agostenga =

Agostenga is an alternate name for several wine and table grape varieties including:

- Luglienga
- Prié blanc
- Vermentino
