= Vuillermin (grape) =

Variety of grape

Vuillermin (French: [vyjɛʁmɛ̃]) is a red Italian wine grape variety grown along the border of Switzerland in the Aosta Valley of northwest Italy. First documented under the name Vuillermin in 1890, the grape was virtually extinct until it was discovered by ampelographers at the Institut Agricole Régional of Aosta growing in isolated vineyards in communes of Châtillon and Pontey.

== History ==
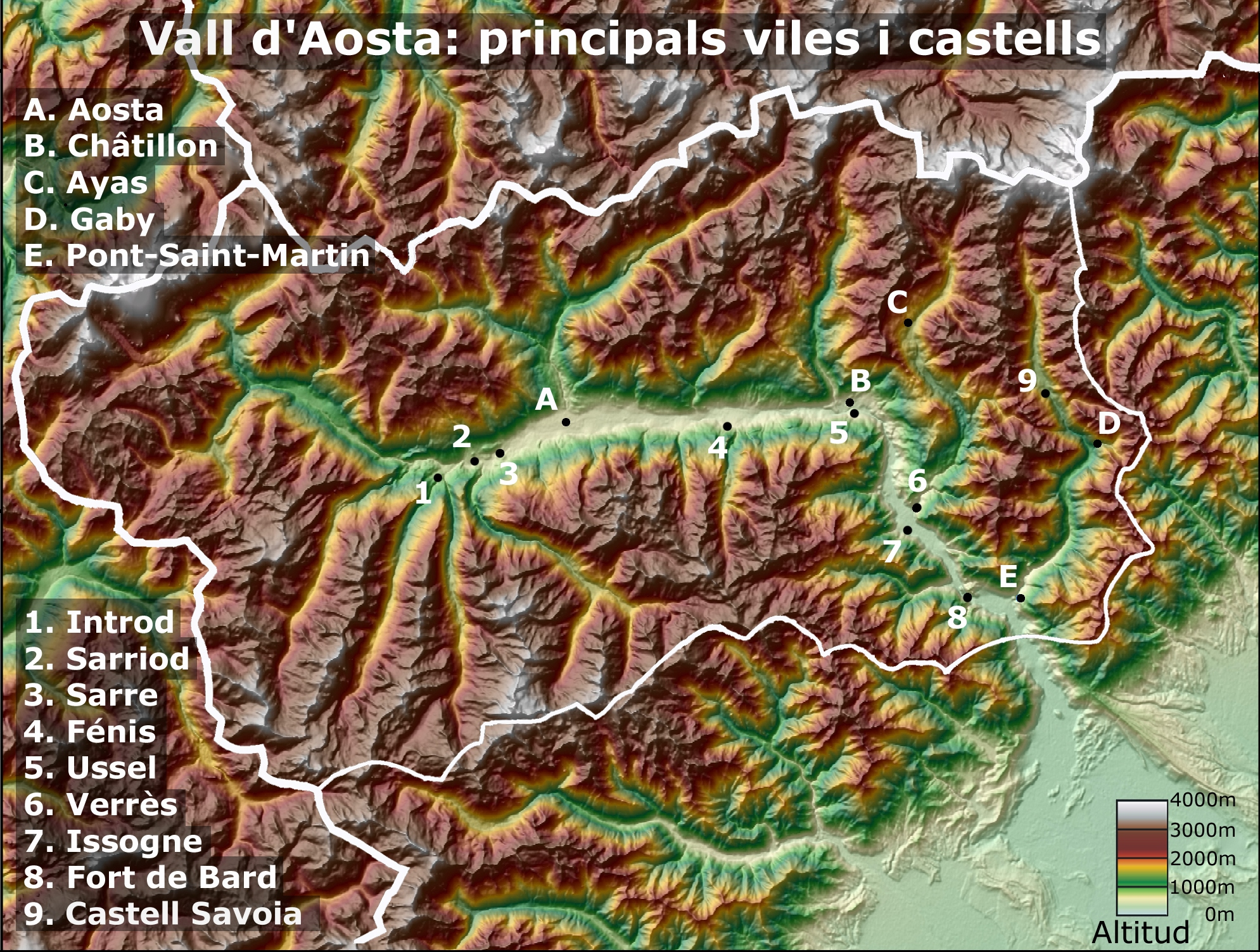
The Aosta Valley, where Vuillermin likely originated.

In 1838, Italian ampelographer Lorenzo Gatta documented the wine grapes growing in the Aosta Valley of which he included a grape known as Spron (or Eperon). In 1999, ampelographer Giulio Moriondo noted the similarities in the description of the Spron/Eperon grape and Vuillermin and speculated that the two grapes may be the same variety.

The first documented mention of the grape under the name Vuillermin was in 1890 by L. N. Bich in the Bulletin du Comice Agricole. Today, ampelographers believe that Vuillermin was likely the name of a local family in the Aosta Valley who may have helped propagate the variety. In 2011, DNA analysis showed that Vuillermin was the offspring of the red Aosta variety Fumin and an unknown grapevine that is possibly now extinct.

Vuillermin, itself, was on the verge of extinction until it was discovered in the late 20th century by ampelographers working for the Institut Agricole Régional growing in old vineyards in the communes of Châtillon and Pontey. The ampelographers brought the vine back to the nursery at the Institut and have been assisting local growers with revitalizing plantings of the grape.

== Viticulture ==
Vuillermin is a late ripening grapevine which can present viticultural challenges in cool climate regions like the Aosta Valley with its shorter growing seasons.

== Wine regions ==
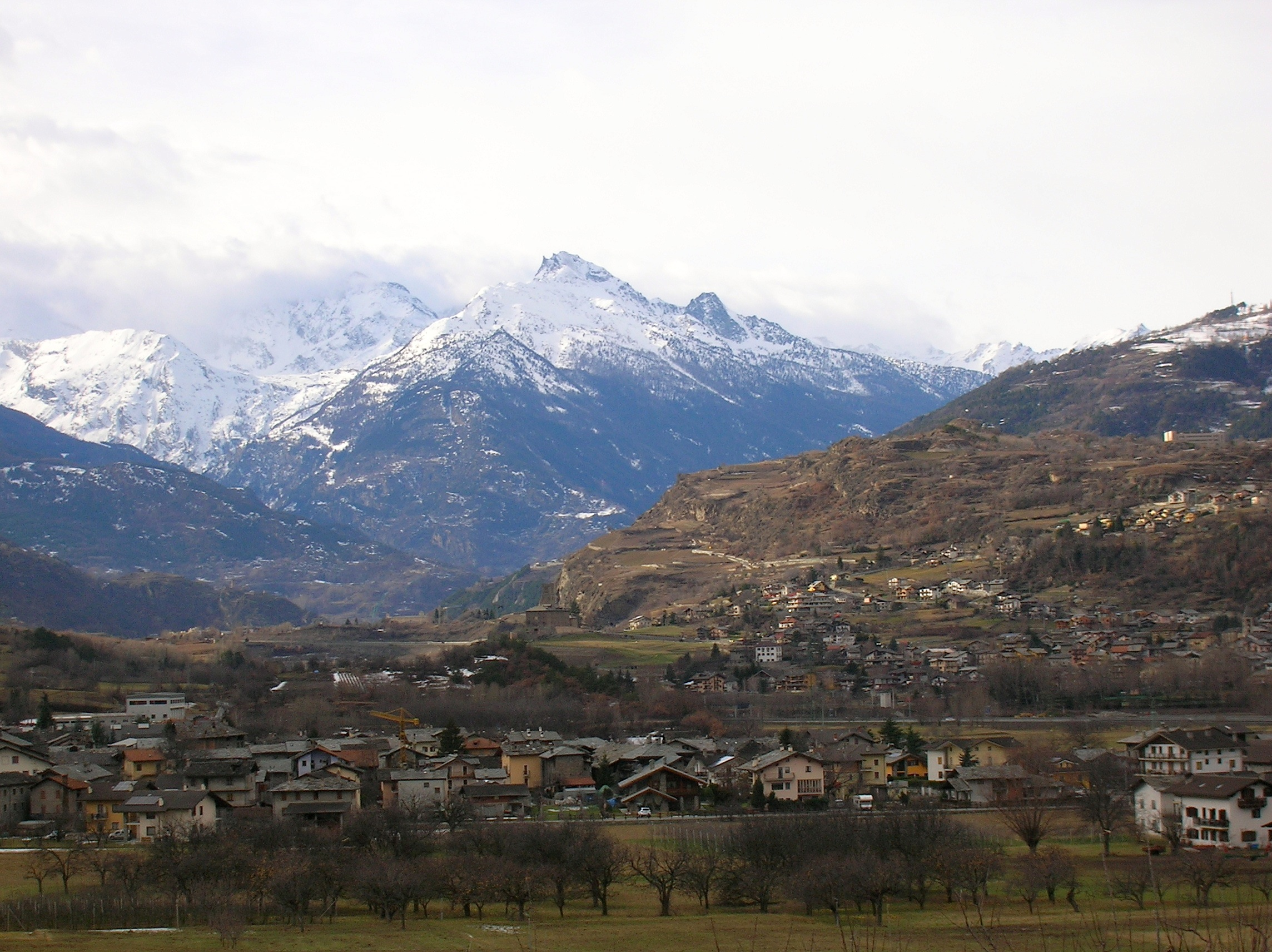
The commune of Sarre, where Vuillermin is grown.

In 2000, there was only 0.1 hectares (0.25 acres) of Vuillermin planted across three vineyards in the Aosta Valley. In addition the nursery planting in Aosta at the Institut Agricole Régional, individual growers in Chambave and Sarre were also experimenting with the variety. While the grape is rarely seen as a varietal, it is a permitted blending variety in the Denominazione di origine controllata (DOC) wines of the Valle d'Aosta.

== Synonyms ==
Over the years, Vuillermin has been known under a variety of synonyms including: Eperon and Spron.
