= Châtelard Castle =

Châtelard Castle may refer to:

- Châtelard Castle, Aosta Valley - a castle in the town of La Salle in the Italian Aosta Valley
- Châtelard Castle, Vaud - a castle in the Montreux area of the Swiss canton of Vaud

== See also ==
- Châtelard
