= Roussin de Morgex =

Variety of grape

- Grape (Vitis)
- Color of berry skin: Pink
- Origin: Italy
- Notable regions: Valle d'Aosta
- VIVC number: 22741

Roussin de Morgex is an Italian grape variety, native to the western part of the Aosta Valley in the municipality of Morgex. It is a pink-skinned teinturier grape that produced a light pink juice. Although it may by used as one of the autochthonous varieties allowed in the red DOC wine from the region, Valle d'Aosta Rosso or Vallée d'Aoste Rouge, in 2010 it was not cultivated commercially; according to wine writer Ian D'Agata nobody had made wine from it in 300 years. Since then, small experimental plantings have been made, and a subsequent 20 bottle batch of pink sparkling wine produced by Cave Mont Blanc in 2014 showed sufficient promise to spur further research and planting.

== Origin ==
Roussin de Morgex belongs to a group of grape varieties geographically isolated in the Alpine regions of Italy and Valais, in Switzerland. DNA analyses suggest that while unrelated to Roussin, it is related to the Prié variety, and more distantly to Rèze, from the Swiss Alps. The grape was rescued by Giulio Moriondo of the Institut Agricole Régional in Aoste in 1998.
