= Neyret =

Variety of grape

Neyret is a red Italian wine grape variety that is grown in the mountainous Valle d'Aosta wine region of northwest Italy though most plantings are in the slightly less mountainous terrain of southeast Aosta Valley bordering the Piedmont wine region. DNA profiling has confirmed that the variety is a Vitis vinifera crossing of Mayolet and Roussin.

== DOC wines ==
Within the all encompassing Denominazione di origine controllata (DOC) of the Valle d'Aosta region Neyret is a permitted variety in the standard red wine as well several specialized wine within the DOC. For the general Rosso and rosé wine, Neyret grapes must be harvested at a yield no greater than 12 tonnes/hectare with the finished wine attaining a minimum alcohol level of at least 9.5% and be aged at least six months prior to release.

Wine produced in the communes of Arnad and Montjovet are permitted to include Neyret in their Nebbiolo-based wine (minimum 70%) provided that Neyret doesn't exceed 30% of the blend along with Dolcetto, Vien de Nus, Pinot noir and Freisa. These grapes are limited to a maximum harvest yield of 8 tonnes/ha with the finished wines being aged for at least eight months and having a minimum alcohol level of 11%. A separate Superiore bottling can also be produced with two years of aging and a minimum alcohol of 12%. In the commune of Donnas (or Donnaz), Neyret is a minor blending component along with Freisa and Vien de Nus (maximum 15%) in the Nebbiolo-based wine of the region. Here grapes are limited to 7.5 tonnes/ha with the wines needing two years of aging and a minimum alcohol level of 11%.

Around the village of Arvier, Neyret can be included, along with Gamay, Vien de Nus, Dolcetto and Pinot noir (up to 15% collectively) in the Petit Rouge based wines of Enfer d'Arvier. The Torrette sub-zone located east of Arvier also produces a Petit Rouge-based wine (minimum 70%) that Neyret is permitted in (up to 30%) along with Fumin, Pinot noir, Gamay, Vien de Nus and Dolcetto. Like Arvier, these grapes are limited to a harvest yield of 10 tonnes/ha with the finished wine needing to spend at least six months aging in oak and attaining a minimum alcohol level of 11%. A Superiore bottling will be aged at least eight months in wood and reached a minimum alcohol level of 12%.

== Synonyms ==
Over the years Neyret has been known under a variety of synonyms including Negret, Neiret, Neirette, Neret, Neret Gros, Neret Picciou, Neret Rare and Serre.
