= Arvier =

Arvier Arvì/Arvë (Valdôtain) Arviér (Arpitan)
- Comune
- Comune di Arvier; Commune d'Arvier
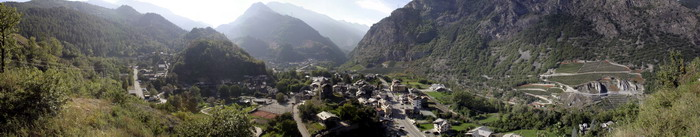

- Coat of arms

- Location of Arvier in Italy Arvier (Aosta Valley)
- Coordinates: 45°42′11″N 7°10′0″E
- Country: Italy
- Region: Aosta Valley
- Province: none
- Frazioni: Baise-Pierre, Chamençon, Chamin, Chez les Fournier, Chez les Garin, Chez les Moget, Chez les Roset, Grand Haury, La Crête, La Ravoire, Léverogne, Mécosse, Petit Haury, Planaval, Rochefort, Verney

Area
  - Total: 33 km^{2} (13 sq mi)
- Elevation: 776 m (2,546 ft)

Population (31 December 2022)
  - Total: 822
  - Density: 25/km^{2} (65/sq mi)
- Demonym: Arvelains
- Time zone: UTC+1 (CET)
  - Summer (DST): UTC+2 (CEST)
- Postal code: 11011
- Dialing code: 0165
- Patron saint: Saint Sulpice
- Saint day: 17 January
- Website: Official website

Arvier French pronunciation (Valdôtain: Arvì or Arvë; Arpitan: Arviér); is a town and comune in the Aosta Valley region of northwestern Italy.

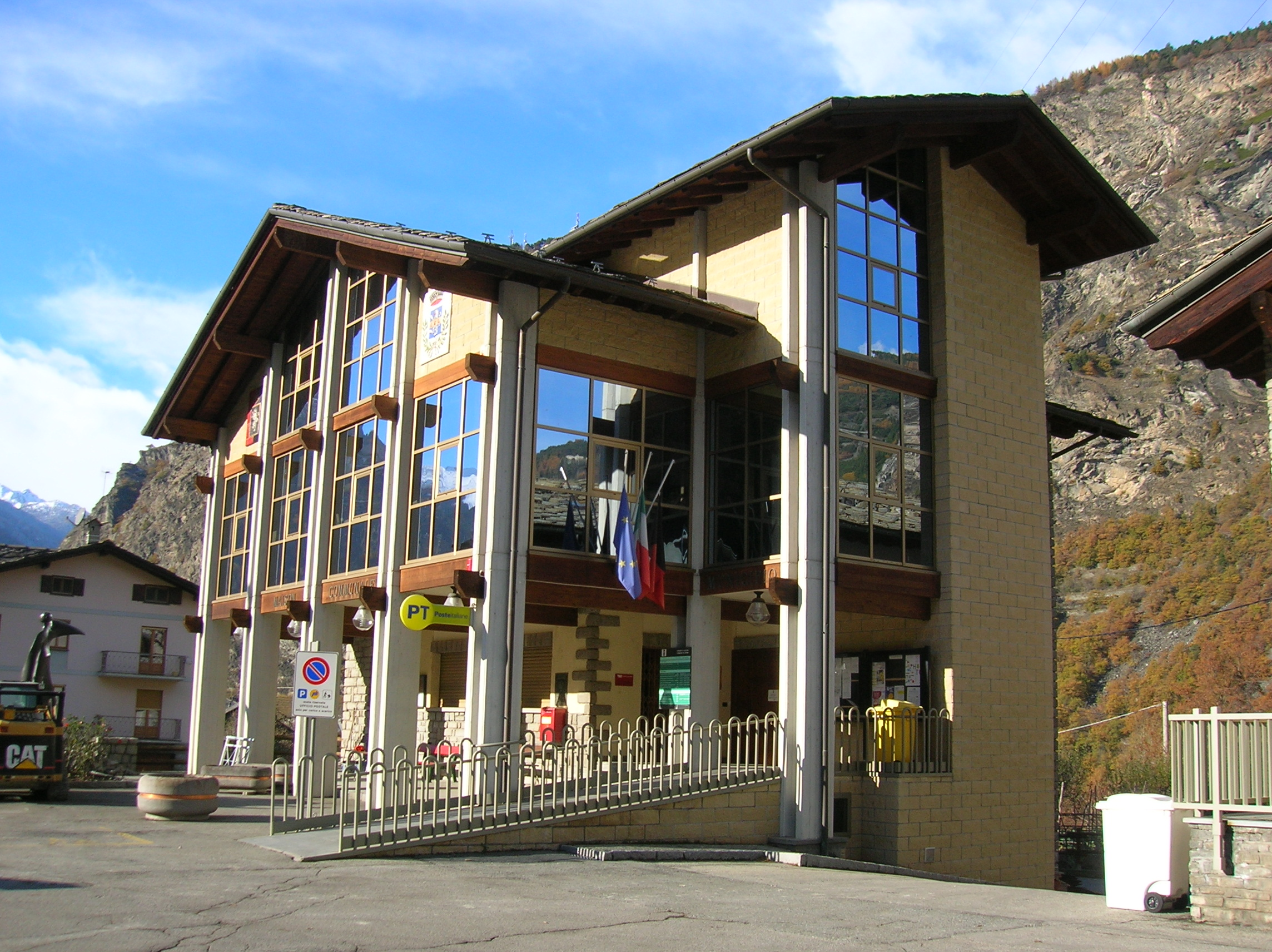
The town Hall

== Geography ==
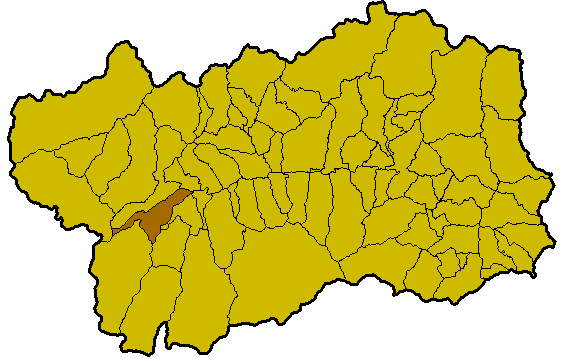
Location of the commune of Arvier within the Valle d'Aosta

== Wine ==
The local wine, Enfer d'Arvier, had its own DOC designation before being subsumed into the Valle d'Aosta DOC. It is a blend made primarily from the Petit Rouge grape with lesser amounts of Dolcetto, Gamay, Neyret, Pinot noir, and/or Vien de Nus.

== People ==
Arvier was the birthplace of Maurice Garin, the winner of the original Tour de France in 1903. His family migrated to Northern France in 1885.
