= St Lawrence's Church, Chambave =

Church in Chambave, Italy

Saint Lawrence's Church
- Chiesa di San Lorenzo (Italian); Église Saint-Laurent (French)
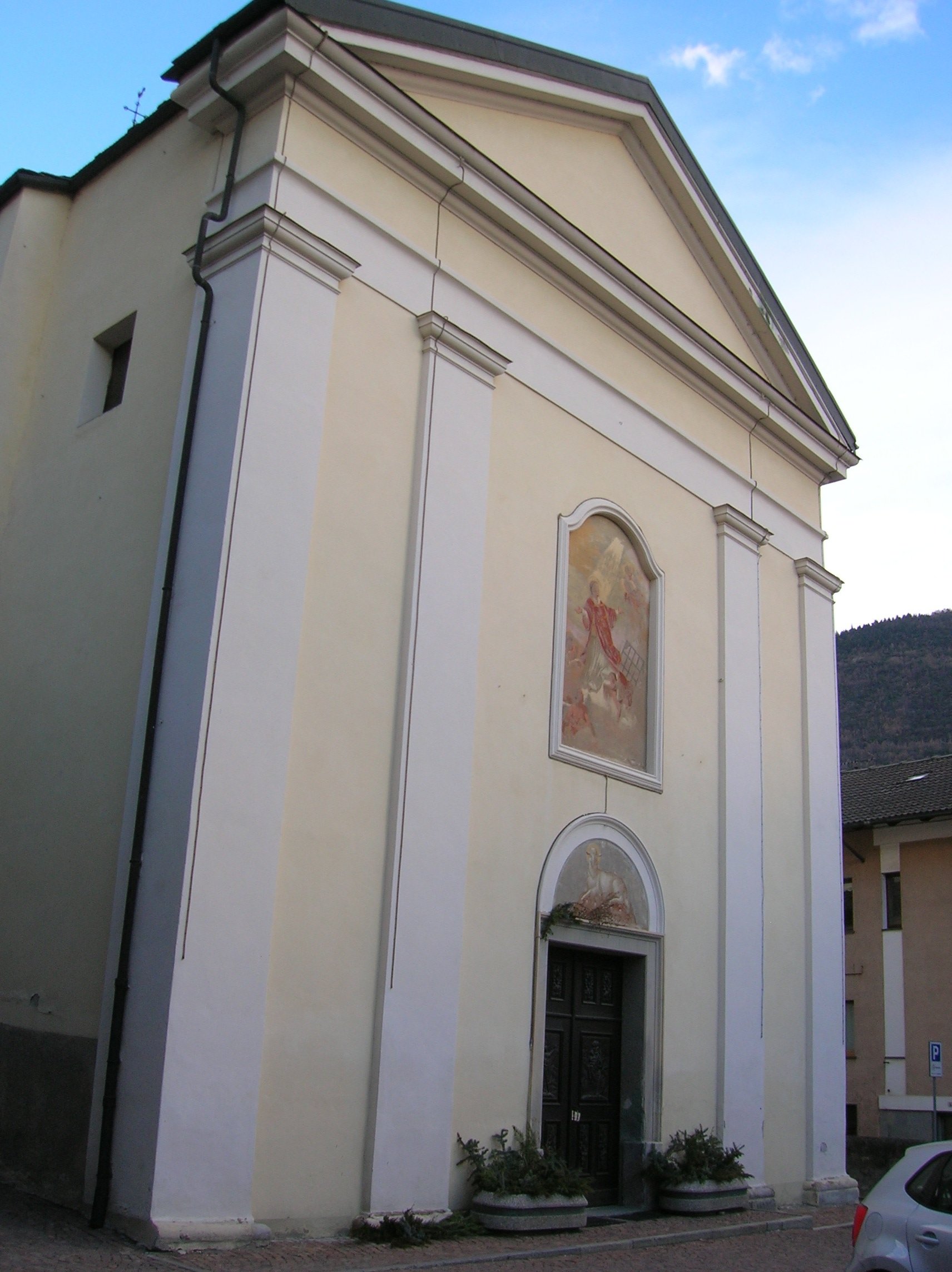
- The church in 2013
- Click on the map for a fullscreen view
- 45°44′40.24″N 7°33′00.41″E
- Location: Chambave
- Country: Italy
- Denomination: Roman Catholic

Architecture
- Functional status: Active

Administration
- Diocese: Diocese of Aosta

The Saint Lawrence's Church (Italian: Chiesa di San Lorenzo; French: Église Saint-Laurent) is a Roman Catholic church located in Chambave, Italy.

== History ==
The first documented mention of the church of Chambave dates back to 1100, when the building was probably still under construction. The original Romanesque church was initially under the authority of Fruttuaria Abbey. In 1182, the abbey’s possessions in the Aosta Valley were transferred to the provostship of Saint-Gilles in Verrès. The main surviving element of the original Romanesque building is the lower section of the bell tower, which dates back to the mid-12th century.

In 1744, the parishioners decided to rebuild the church entirely. The work was entrusted to architect Giovanni Ferro of Alagna and was completed in 1748, resulting in the present-day 18th-century building.

A further major alteration took place in 1889, during the priorate of Favre. On this occasion, the nave was extended by demolishing the portico at the front of the church, and two new side chapels were added.
