= Fumin =

Fumin may refer to:

- Fumin County (富民县), Kunming, Yunnan, China
- Fumin Subdistrict, Meihekou (福民街道), Jilin, China
- Fumin Subdistrict, Fushun (福民街道), in Xinfu District, Fushun, Liaoning, China
- Fumin, Huinan County (抚民镇), Jilin, China

Other:

- Fumin (grape), Italian grape variety from Valle d'Aosta
