= Valle d'Aosta DOC =

Wine producing region of north-west Italy

- Wine region
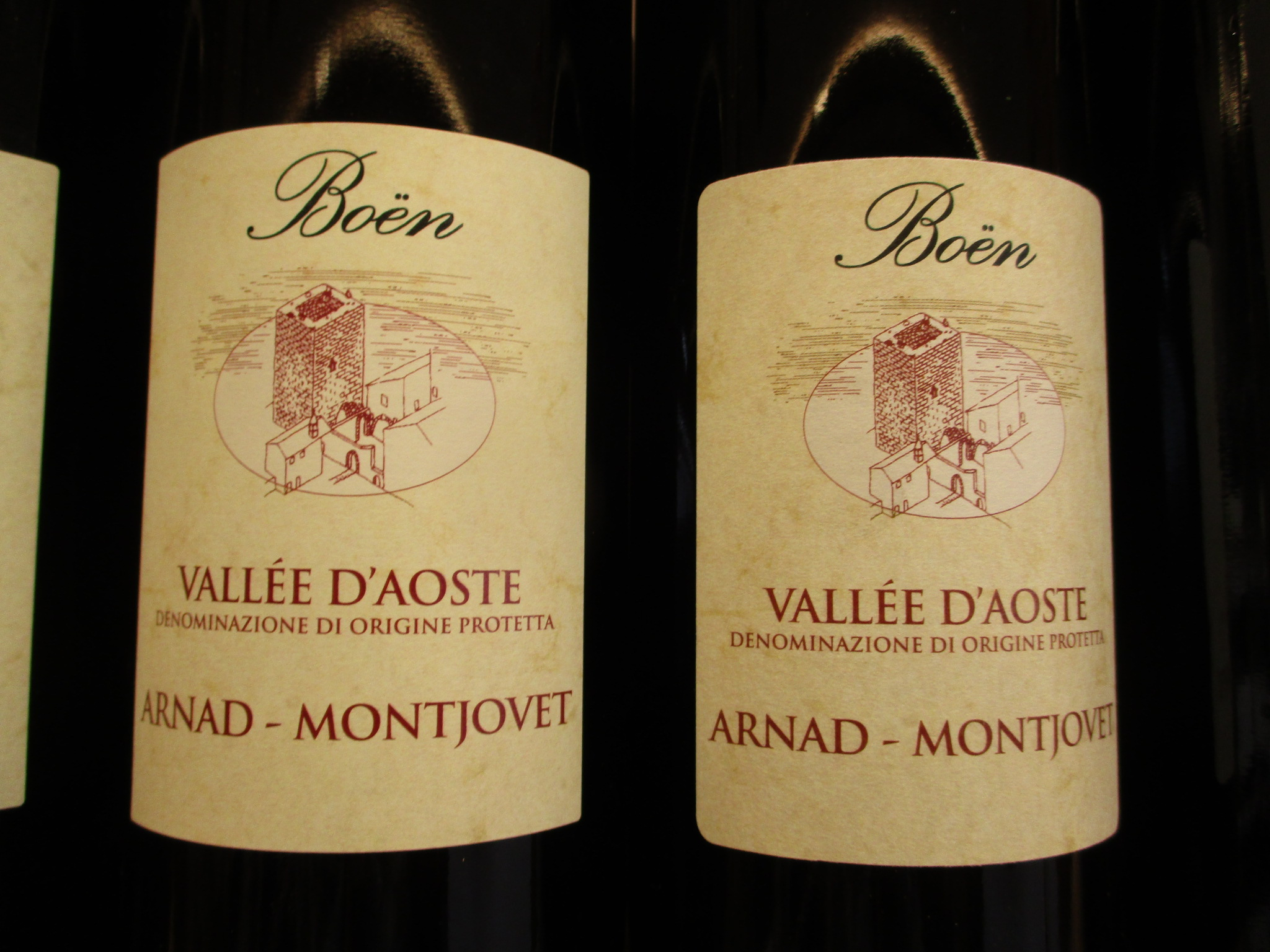
- Official name: Denominazione di origine controllata Valle d'Aosta / Vallée d'Aoste
- Other names: Vallée d'Aoste DOC
- Type: DOC
- Year established: 8 February 1971; 54 years ago
- Country: Italy
- Part of: Aosta Valley
- Sub-regions: Arnad-Montjovet; Blanc de Morgex et de La Salle; Chambave; Donnaz; Enfer d'Arvier; Nus; Torrette
- Climate region: Alpine, cool continental
- Heat units: Low
- Precipitation (annual average): High (mountain-influenced)
- Soil conditions: Morainic; Alluvial; Glacial
- Size of planted vineyards: ~400 ha
- Grapes produced: Nebbiolo (Picotendro), Petite Rouge, Fumin, Cornalin, Mayolet, Premetta, Prié Blanc, Chardonnay, Pinot Gris, Müller-Thurgau, Petite Arvine
- Varietals produced: Red, white, rosé, sparkling, passito wines
- Wine produced: Still red & white, sparkling, late-harvest

The Valle d'Aosta DOC (French: Vallée d'Aoste DOC (Note: Due to the official bilingual status of the Aosta Valley.)) is an Italian denominazione di origine controllata located in the Aosta Valley of north-west Italy. Surrounded by the Alps, the Valle d'Aosta is home to the highest elevated vineyards in all of Europe. The principal winemaking region of the Valle d'Aosta is found along the eastern banks of the Dora Baltea (French: Doire baltée) river with the city of Aosta serving as the central winemaking location.

The region is divided into three main vineyard areas; the upper valley, Valdigne, the central valley (locally Valle centrale in Italian, Vallée centrale in French) and the lower valley, (locally Bassa valle in Italian, Basse vallée in French).

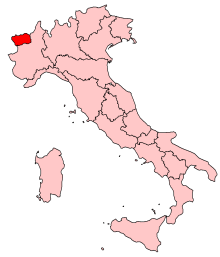
Aosta Valley, the Valle d'Aosta region.

To the south is the winemaking region of Piedmont. The Valle d'Aosta is Italy's smallest winemaking region both in terms of size and production with only about 330,000 cases produced annually in the region and only 36,000 cases produced under the DOC label. Seventy five percent of the area's production is red wine made mostly from the Pinot noir, Gamay and Petit Rouge varieties. A white wine is made from the indigenous Prié blanc grape by the cooperative of Blanc de Morgex et de La Salle.

== Climate and geography ==
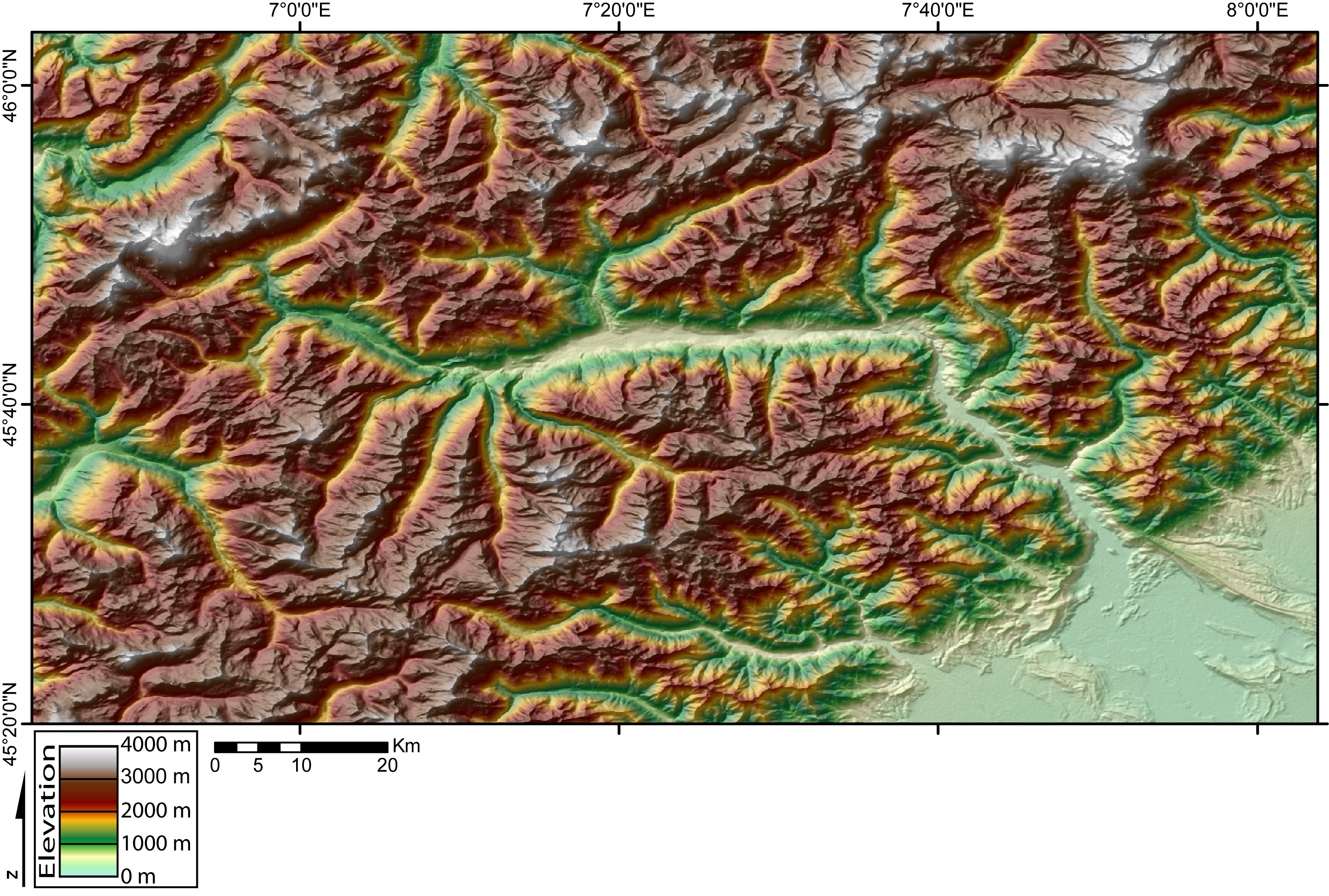
Elevation of the Valle d'Aosta. The lower elevation in the center of the image is the Dora Baltea river leading from Mont Blanc (on the left) down through the valley to Piedmont.

The area of the Aosta valley has continental climate and despite its location in the Alps region the weather is typically very hot and dry in the summer time which tends to put harvesttime in early September. The geography of the wine regions is marked by high, steep slopes leading to the river valley which makes the use of mechanical vineyard equipment nearly impossible. The vineyard soils are composed primarily of sand at the higher elevation with more alluvial sediments of clay and gravel further down into the valley.

== Vineyards ==
The wine-making region of the Valle d'Aosta is generally divided into three areas. In the northwest, the Valdigne area south of the commune of Courmayeur is home to the highest elevated vineyards in Europe at 1,200 metres (3,900 ft) above sea level. The white grape Prié Blanc (also known as Blanc de Morgex) accounts for almost all of the vineyard area and is used to produce Blanc de Morgex et de la Salle in both a still and sparkling wine style. Roussin de Morgex, a rare teinturier variety endemic to only a small area around the town of Morgex, has been rescued from extinction to make an unusual pink sparkling wine. Due to its high elevations, the area has never been affected by phylloxera louse, which has allowed the vineyards of this area to remain with ungrafted rootstock.

The Central Valley is the region's most productive area and is further sub-divided into four areas-Enfer d'Arvier, Torrette, Nus and Chambave. The Enfer d'Arvier is a red wine-producing area around the village of Arvier. The wines from this area are blends made primarily from the Petit Rouge grape with lesser amounts of Dolcetto, Gamay, Neyret, Pinot noir, and/or Vien de Nus. Previously Enfer d'Arvier had its own DOC designation but was subsequently incorporated into the Valle d'Aosta DOC. The area of the Torrette sub-zone is located east of Arvier and produces a drier wine made with at least 70% Petit Rouge and smaller quantities of Dolcetto, Fumin, Gamay, Neyret, Pinot noir and/or Vien de Nus. The village of Nus, located east of Aosta, produces a wine made with at least 50% Vien de Nus and at least 40% Petit Rouge. White wines are made in this area from a Pinot gris clone known as Malvoisie including a sweet passito straw wine. East of Nus is the sub-zone of Chambave which includes the communities of Chambave, Châtillon and Saint-Vincent. The red wines made here are composed of at least 60% Petit Rouge with some Dolcetto, Gamay and/or Pinot noir. The white wines made here are from the Moscato Bianco grape.

The Lower Valley is known primarily for two styles of wine. The Arnad-Montjovet area produces a medium-bodied dry red wine made from at least 70% Nebbiolo with some Dolcetto, Freisa, Neyret, Pinot noir, and/or Vien de Nus. The area near the commune of Donnaz (or Donnas) produces wine made from at least 85% Nebbiolo with some Freisa, Neyret, Pinot noir and Vien de Nus. Like Enfer d'Arvier, Donnas at one point had its own DOC designation.

Here Nebbiolo is paler and less potent due to the high altitude.

== Other wines ==
Other DOC wines in the Valle d'Aosta can be varietally labeled as long as it contains at least 90% from one of the following grapes-Chardonnay, Fumin, Gamay, Müller-Thurgau, Petite Arvine, Pinot gris, Pinot noir, Petit Rouge and Premetta. A generic Valle d'Aosta Bianco/Blanc, Valle d'Aosta Rosso/Rouge and Valle d'Aosta Rosato/Rosé can be produced from any local grape (such as Bonda and Vuillermin) as long as the wine is made in the appropriate color for the style. The region has no Indicazione Geografica Tipica (IGT) designations so that any wine that doesn't fit into one of the 22 DOC styles is sold under the vini da tavola designation.

== DOC regulations ==
For the majority of wines, DOC regulations require harvest yields below 12 tonnes per ha with a minimum alcohol levels of at least 9%. Wines typically must age for at least 6 months prior to public release. For some individual wine styles there are notable exceptions and stricter requirements such as the Pinot gris from Nus which is required to have a maximum yield of 8 tonnes/ha and a minimum alcohol content of 16.5% which is very high for a typical white wine. The reserve wines labeled Superiore from the Arnad-Montjovet region must have a minimum alcohol level of 12% and be aged for two years. The Superiore wines from Torrette need a similar 12% alcohol level but only require eight months of aging which is specifically required to be done in oak (wine) casks. The Moscatos from Chambave also require oak aging but only for three months.
