= Blanc de Champagne =

Blanc de Champagne is an alternate name for several wine grape varieties including:

- Chardonnay
- Luglienga
- Pinot blanc
- Shampanchik

== Other uses ==
- Blanc de blancs, a style of white Champagne or sparkling wine made only from white wine grapes
