= Regner (surname) =

Regner is a German habitational surname composed of the ancient Germanic elements ragin.

An ancient and German noble family, originally from the Bavaria, with main residences in the cities of Nördlingen and Schweinfurt, that has spread, throughout the centuries, in different European regions. Moreover, this family, in all ages, always stood out.

== Viticulture ==
Regner is a white German wine grape variety that is a crossing of the table grape Seidentraube (also known as Luglienga bianca) and the Vitis vinifera red grape variety Gamay. The variety was developed in 1929 and by 2019 there was almost 12 hectares (30 acres) of Regner planted in Germany, all in the Rheinhessen.

== Notable people ==
- Alfred-Georges Regner (1902–1987), French surrealist painter and engraver
- Art Regner, American radio personality
- Åsa Regnér (born 1964), Swedish Social Democratic politician
- Brent Regner (born 1989), Canadian professional ice hockey defenceman
- David J. Regner (1931–2013), American politician
- Evelyn Regner (born 1966), Austrian lawyer and politician
- Georg Regner (born 1953), Austrian sprinter
- Rudolf Regner (1917–1941), Polish scout, soldier and member of the White Couriers
- Shelley Regner (born 1988), American actress and singer
- Tobias Regner (born 1982), German singer and guitarist
- Tom Regner (1944–2014), American football player
