= Bonda (grape) =

Variety of grape

Bonda is a red Italian wine grape variety that is grown in the Aosta Valley region of northwest Italy around the communes of Châtillon and Quart. Historically the grape has been confused with another grape of Aosta, Primetta, but DNA analysis in the early 21st century showed that the two grapes were distinct and not closely related. Despite being known under the synonym of Prié rouge, Bonda is not a color mutation of Prié blanc nor do the two grapes seem to be closely related.

== History and relationship with other grapes ==
Bonda has been growing in the Aosta Valley since at least the 19th century when wine writers of the period suspected that the grape may be identical to the Mossana grape of Piedmont, a variety that today is no longer commercially cultivated. The historical synonym of Prié rouge also lead to speculation about the grape being the same as the Italian grape varieties Primetta and Prié blanc.

While today ampelographers do believe that the grape originated in northern Italy, DNA analysis in the early 21st century has rejected any close genetic relationship between Bonda with Primetta and Prié blanc. However, DNA evidence has confirmed that there is some link between the grape and Mossana as well as with the Nosiola grape of the South Tyrol wine region of northeast Italy.

== Viticulture ==
Bonda is a late ripening grape variety.

== Wine regions ==
Today, Bonda is close to extinction with less than 3 hectares (7.4 acres) of the grape in cultivation from old vine vineyards around Châtillon and Quart. The few producers who still make wine from Bonda usually use the grape as a blending component rather than as a varietal.

== Synonyms ==
While historically known under the synonym of Prié rouge, Bonda currently has no synonyms recognized by the Vitis International Variety Catalogue (VIVC).
