= Vien de Nus =

Variety of grape

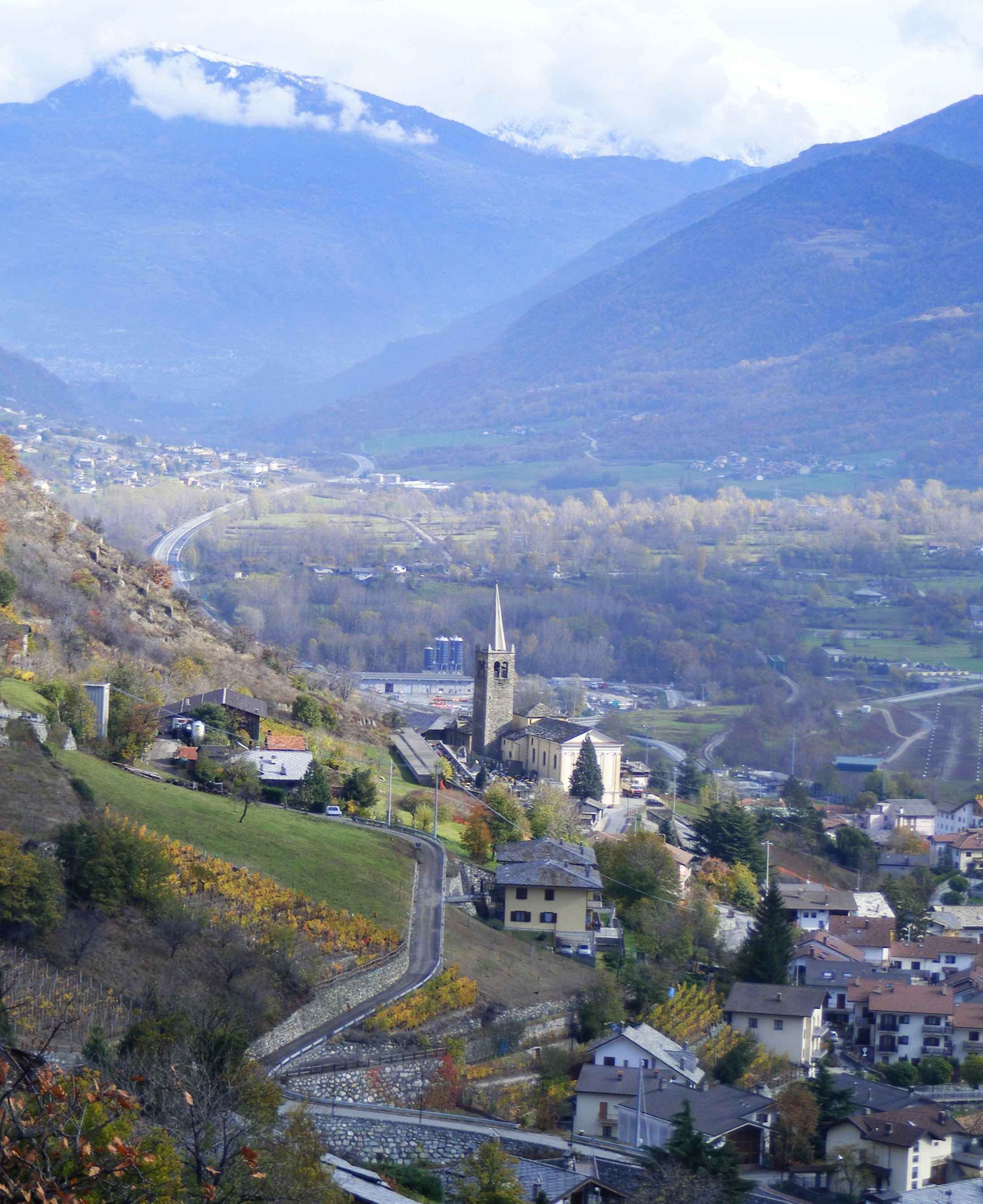
The town of Nus is one of the few places in the world where the Vien de Nus grape is found.

Vien de Nus is a red Italian wine grape variety that is grown primarily in the Valle d'Aosta DOC. It is particularly associated with the town of Nus where it is the primary grape in the Nus Rouge wine of the region. Outside of this region, the grape is rarely found elsewhere and is nearly extinct.

== DOC rules ==
Within the larger Valle d'Aosta DOC, Vien de Nus is a permitted variety in several smaller DOC designated wines each with their own unique DOC specification on how Vien de Nus is used. These include:

- Nus Rouge - Primarily Vien de Nus (min 60%) with Petit Rouge and Pinot noir permitted up to 40%. The grapes must be harvested at a yield no greater than 8 tonnes/hectare with the finished win attaining a minimum alcohol level of 11%. The wine must have a minimum of 6 months aging prior to release.
- Arnad-Montjovet - Primarily Nebbiolo (min 70%) with Vien de Nus permitted as a blending component along with Dolcetto, Pinot noir, Freisa and Neyret up to 30%. The grapes must be harvested at a yield no greater than 8 tonnes/hectare with the finished win attaining a minimum alcohol level of 11%. The wine must have a minimum of 8 months aging prior to release. A separate supérieur bottling can be produced with a minimum alcohol level of 12% and at least two years aging prior to release.
- Donnas - Primarily Nebbiolo (85% min) with Vien de Nus permitted as a blending component along with Freisa and Neyret up to 15%. The grapes must be harvested at a yield no greater than 7.5 tonnes a hectare with the finished win attaining a minimum alcohol level of 11%. The wine must be aged for a minimum of 2 years prior to release.
- Enfer d'Arvier - Primarily Petit Rouge (min 60%) with Vien de Nus permitted as a blending component along with Gamay, Dolcetto, Pinot noir and Freisa and Neyret up to 15%.
- Torrette - Primarily Petit Rouge (min 70%) with Vien de Nus permitted as a blending component along with Fumin, Pinot noir, Gamay, Neyret and Dolcetto up to 30%. The grapes must be harvested at a yield no greater than 10 tonnes/hectare with the finished win attaining a minimum alcohol level of 11%. The wine must have a minimum of 6 months aging in oak prior to release. A separate supérieur bottling can be produced with a minimum alcohol level of 12% and at least 8 months aging in wood.

== Synonyms ==
Vien de Nus has been known under a variety of synonyms including Gros oriou, Gros rodzo, Gros rouge, Gros vien, Gros vien de Nus, Oriou gros, Plant de Nus, Rouge de Fully and Rouge mâle d'Arvier.
