= La Salle, Aosta Valley =

La Salle La Sala (Valdôtain)
- Comune
- Comune di La Salle; Commune de La Salle
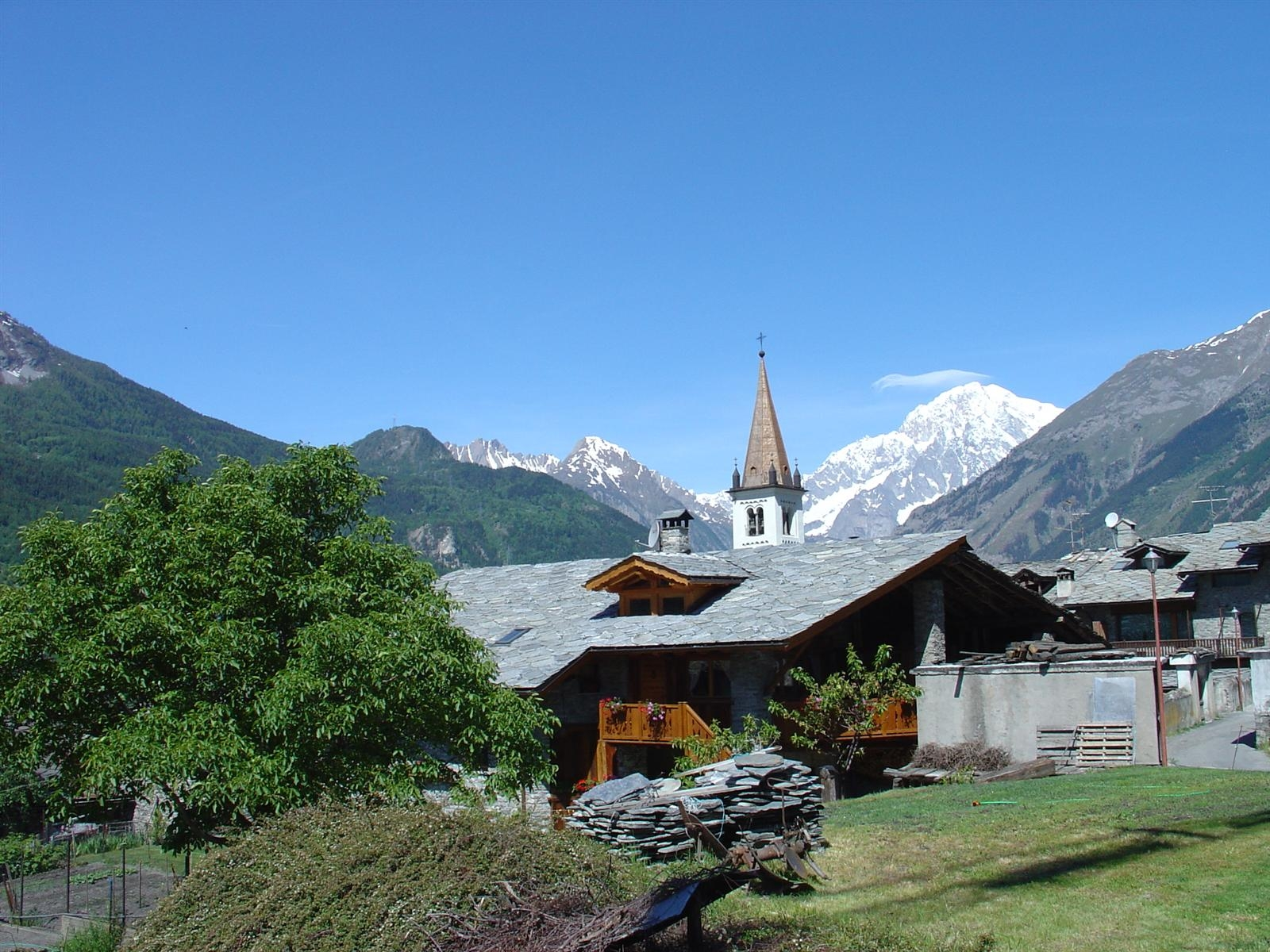
- La Salle with the Mont Blanc in the background.

- Location within Italy Location within Aosta Valley
- Coordinates: 45°44′50″N 7°4′30″E
- Country: Italy
- Region: Aosta Valley
- Province: none
- Frazioni: Chabodey, Le Pont, La Clusaz, Croix-des-Prés, Écharlod, Équilivaz, Chez Béneyton, Fenêtre, Charvaz, Moras, Chez-les-Rosset, Villair, Cré, Villaret, Derby, Chez-les-Gontier, Le Champ, Écours, Prarion, Moyes, Cottin, Chaffieron, Châtelard, Le Château, Beauregard, Villarisson, Remondey, Les Places, Chaffiéry, Arbétey, Chez-les-Baud, Chez-les-Émonet, Beillardey, Cheverel, Challancin, Grassey, Morge, Planaval, Piginière, Chez-Borgne

Government
  - Mayor: Loris Salice

Area
  - Total: 83 km^{2} (32 sq mi)
- Elevation: 1,001 m (3,284 ft)

Population (31 December 2022)
  - Total: 2,017
  - Density: 24/km^{2} (63/sq mi)
- Demonym: Sallereins
- Time zone: UTC+1 (CET)
  - Summer (DST): UTC+2 (CEST)
- Postal code: 11015
- Dialing code: 0165
- Patron saint: Cassian of Imola
- Saint day: August 13
- Website: Official website

La Salle (French: [la sal]; Valdôtain: La Sala (locally La Sala)) is a town and comune in the Aosta Valley region of north-western Italy.

== Economy ==
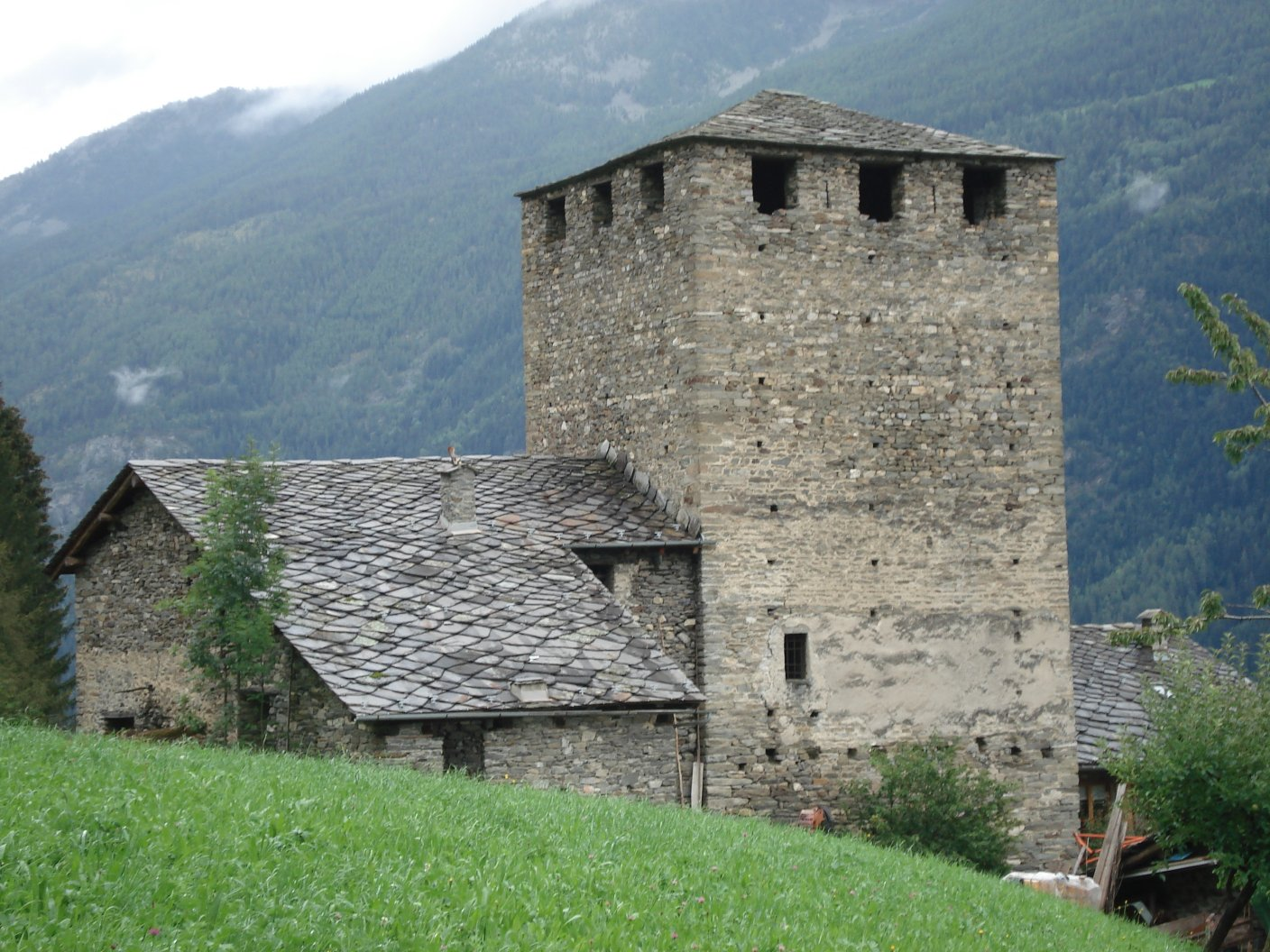
Écours Castle

The economy of La Salle is, today, mainly based on tourism, during summer and winter seasons. Nevertheless, it retains some handicraft and agricultural activities. In particular the viticulture with the production of the Vallée d'Aoste Blanc de Morgex et de La Salle a DOC white wine made from the Prié blanc grape.

== Landmarks ==
- Châtelard Castle
