= Châtelard =

Châtelard or Le Châtelard may refer to the following places:

- Châtelard, Creuse, a commune in the Creuse department, France
- Châtelard, Vaud, a place in the commune of Lutry in the canton of Vaud, Switzerland
- Le Châtelard, Fribourg, a commune in the canton of Fribourg, Switzerland
- Le Châtelard, Savoie, a commune in the Savoie department, France
- Le Châtelard, Valais, a place in the commune of Finhaut in the canton of Valais, Switzerland

See also

- Châtelard Castle (disambiguation)
