= Regner =

Variety of grape

Regner is a white German wine grape variety that is a crossing of the table grape Seidentraube and the Vitis vinifera red grape variety Gamay. The variety was developed in 1929 and by 2019 there was almost 12 hectares (30 acres) of Regner planted in Germany, all in the Rheinhessen.

== See also ==
- Regner (surname)
