= Prié blanc =

Variety of grape

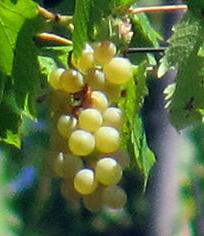
Prié blanc

Prié blanc is a white Italian wine grape variety that is grown almost exclusively in the Valle d'Aosta DOC of northwest Italy. The Valle d'Aosta varietal wine Blanc de Morgex et de La Salle is made from Prié blanc grapes.

Ampelographers consider Prié blanc one of the oldest grape varieties in the Valle d'Aosta. Through a complex pedigree it appears to have some genetic relationship with many other grape varieties in the region. Recent DNA analysis has connected the grape to the Spanish wine grapes of Lairén in Andalusia and Albillo in Ribera del Duero and province of Ávila, but it is not yet known if the grape originated in Spain and traveled to Italy or the inverse.

== History ==
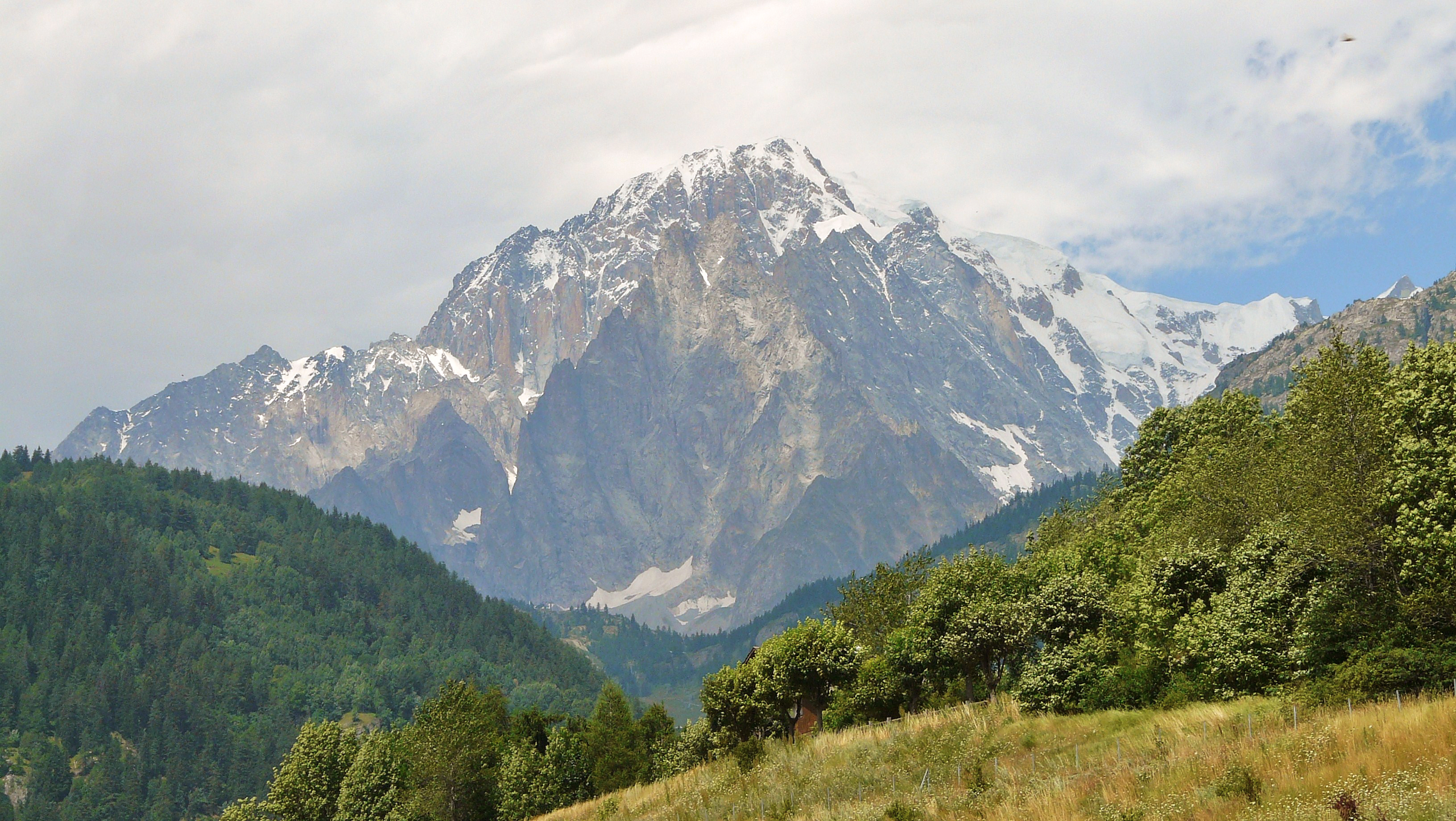
One possible origin of Prié blanc is that the grape originated in the Aosta Valley foothills of Mont Blanc (pictured).

Ampelographers do not yet know definitively the origins of Prié blanc but evidence shows that it is a very old variety that has been growing in the Valle d'Aosta region of northwest Italy since at least 1691 when it was documented as one of the grapes growing in the commune of Saint-Pierre near the city of Aosta. The origins of the name Prié is unknown but one of the grape's early synonyms Blanc du Valdigne comes from the Latin name for the upper reaches of the Aosta Valley that extends to Mont Blanc with some ampelographers speculating that grape maybe indigenous to the foothills of the mountain. Another synonym Agostena which may be derived from the ancient Latin name for the city of Aosta, Augusta Praetoria, also hints to the grape's long history and potential origins in this region. However, the name could also be a derivative from the Italian word agosto referring to the month of August when this early ripening variety is sometimes ready to be harvested.

Another potential place of origin for Prié blanc is the Valais region of Switzerland where the grape seems to have grandparent relationship to the Swiss wine grape Rouge du Pays through Prié blanc's offspring Mayolet. In Switzerland, one of Prié blanc's primary synonyms is Bernarde which may be a reference to the Great St Bernard Pass connecting the Valle d'Aosta to Valais which would likely be the path that cuttings of the grapevine would spread from one region to the other. However, ampelographers like Swiss grape geneticist José Vouillamoz believe that it is far more likely that Prié blanc spread from Aosta to Switzerland than the other way around.

Grapes with a close genetic parent-offspring relationship to Prié blanc have been found in the Castile and León and Andalusia region.

An Italian origin of Prié blanc was long assumed until DNA analysis in 2010 identified plantings of Legiruela in the province of Ávila in north central Spain were actually Prié blanc. Further profiling connected the grape to several Spanish wine grape varieties including a parent-offspring relationship with Albillo from the Ribera del Duero, Ávila in Castile and León and Madrid and the Lairén grown in the southern Spanish wine region of Andalusia, indicating that Prié blanc must have been in Spain for a very long time in order to propagate and interact with other varieties grown so widely apart. Additionally, the exact relationship between Prié blanc, Lairén and Albillo is not yet fully known as to which grape variety is the parent and which varieties are the offspring, suggesting that potentially Prié blanc could be of Spanish origins.

Another grape variety that Prié blanc has an unclear parent-offspring relationship with is the Piedmont wine and table grape Luglienga, of which the two varieties are often confused with. As Luglienga has been growing in the Piedmont region since at least 1329 (although its name has changed) (more than 300 years before the first recorded mention of Prié blanc), it would strongly suggest that Luglienga is more likely the parent variety with Prié blanc the offspring. But the question of how Prié blanc traveled from northern Italy to Spain is still not answered.

=== Relationship to other grapes ===
In addition to the unclear relationship with the varieties mentioned above, Prié blanc has a close genetic relationship to several grape varieties grown in the Valle d'Aosta region. These include a clear parent-offspring relationship with Mayolet and Primetta. Through its parentage of Primetta, Prié blanc is a grand parent of the Swiss grape Rouge du Pays and subsequent great-grandparent variety to the Valle d'Aosta grapes Roussin, Cornalian and Neret di Saint Vincent.

== Viticulture ==
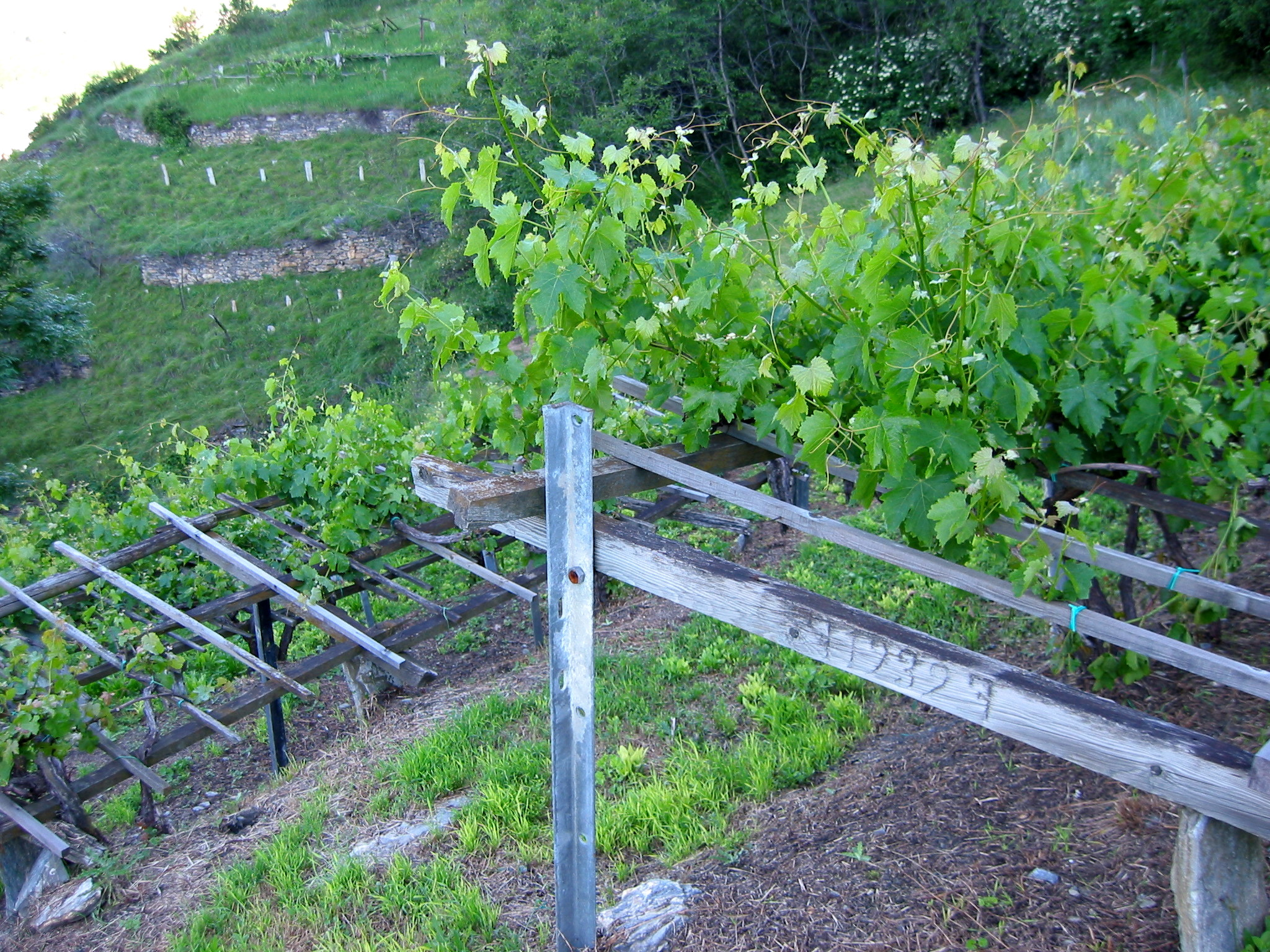
Prié blanc grapes trained in a low pergola system in the Valle d'Aosta region.

Historically, there have been two clones of Prié blanc found in the Valle d'Aosta region. The Valdigne clone from the upper part of the Valley has been a specialty grown in the communes of Morgex and La Salle. The second clone grown around the Valpelline region of the valley in the foothills of Grand Combin, though recorded in the area in 1838 by ampelographer Lorenzo Gatta, is now considered largely extinct with only the Valdigne clone still being used commercially throughout the Valle d'Aosta.

Prié blanc is an early ripening grape variety that has good winter-hardiness and resistance to frost. The grapevine is susceptible to several other viticultural hazards including various rots and the grapevine moth species Eupoecilia ambiguella. Most vines of Prié blanc are ungrafted due to phylloxera's difficulties surviving in the harsh climate conditions of the Valle d'Aosta. In order to maximize the amount of heat needed to fully ripen, vines of Prié blanc are usually trained in low pergola systems near to the ground so that the vines can capture the heat radiating from the soil.

== Wine regions ==
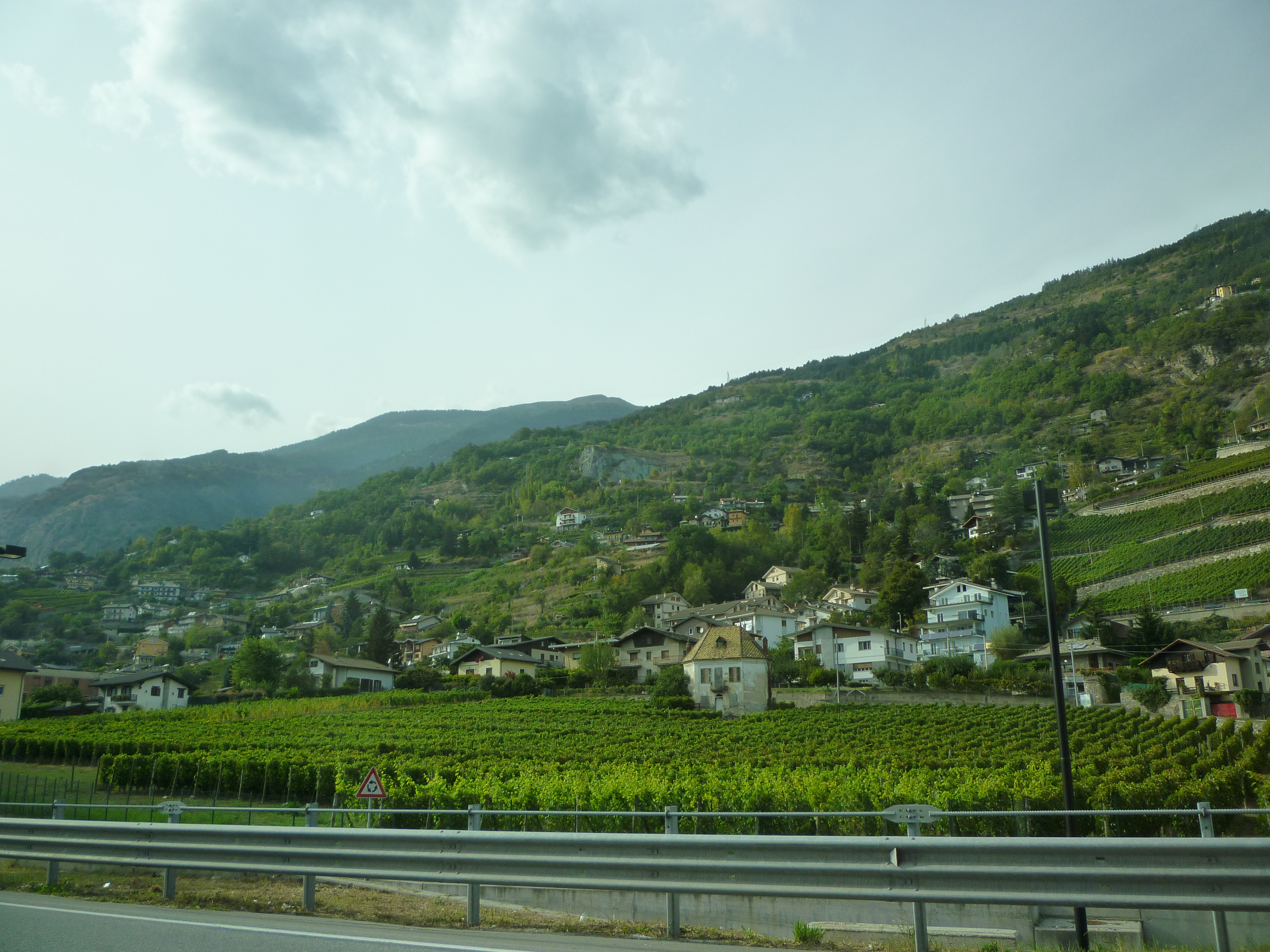
Vineyards in the Valle d'Aosta region

The vast majority of Prié blanc plantings in the world are found in the Valle d'Aosta region of northwest Italy with 39 hectares (96 acres) recorded in 2000. Most of these plantings are situated around the communes of La Salle and Morgex where the grape is permitted to be made as a varietal wine in the Denominazione di origine controllata (DOC) zone of Valle d'Aosta under the label of Blanc de Morgex et de La Salle. With vineyards planted between 900 metres (3,000 ft) to 1,200 metres (3,900 ft) above sea level, these plantings of Prié blanc are some of the highest-elevation vineyards in continental Europe.

Outside of Italy, a scant 0.02 hectares (0.049 acres) of Prié blanc is planted in the Valais region of Switzerland as of 2005 where the grape is known as Bernarde. In Spain, plantings of the grape around found around the commune of San Esteban del Valle in the province of Ávila in the Castile and León region under the name Legiruela. However, these plantings are so small that they have not been registered in the official Spanish census of grape varieties.

== Styles ==
According to Master of Wine Jancis Robinson, Prié blanc tends to make dry wines with "fresh" acidity levels and aromas of white flowers and hay. In the Valle d'Aosta region, the grape is sometimes used to make dessert wines and sparkling wines made in the traditional method of Champagne.

== Synonyms ==
Over the years, Prié blanc has been known under a variety of synonyms including: Agostenga, Agostana, Agostenga bianca. Agostenga blanc, Agostina, Agostinga, Aostenga, Augustina, Augusttraube, Bernarde (in the Valais region), Bernarde nel Vallese, Bernardine, Bianca Capella, Bianca Capello, Blanc Commun, Blanc de La Salle, Blanc de Morgex, Blanc du Valdigne, Blanc Gros, Blanc Petit, Cibebo bianco, Daniela, Danijela, Early Green Madeira, Frueher Leipziger, Giruelo, Gros blanc, Hedvabne Zlute, Hodvabne Zelene, Hodvabne Zlte, Kienzheimer, Kilianer, Legiruela (in the province of Ávila in Castilla y León), Leipziger Frueh, Lugliatica verde, Luglienca bianca, Lyany Mello, Maddalena Salomon, Madeleine Alice, Madeleine Alice Salomon, Malvasia Belaia, Malvasier Frueh weiss, Malvaziya Belaya, Perltraube, Petit blanc, Plant de la Salle, Precoce de Kientzheim, Prie, Prie bianco, Rabolina weiss, Raisin d'Aout, Rosinentraube, Seidentraube Gruen, Uva Agostina, Uva d'Agosto, Uva Luce, Vert Precoce de Madere, Weisswaelscher and Zibebe weiss.
