= Petit Rouge =

Variety of grape

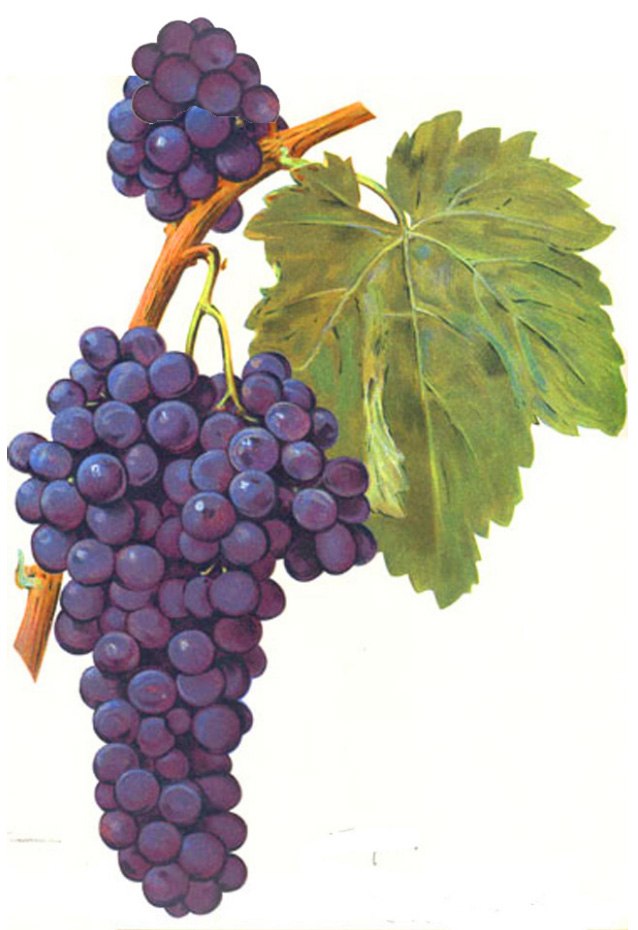
Petit Rouge in Viala & Vermorel (as Oriou Gris).

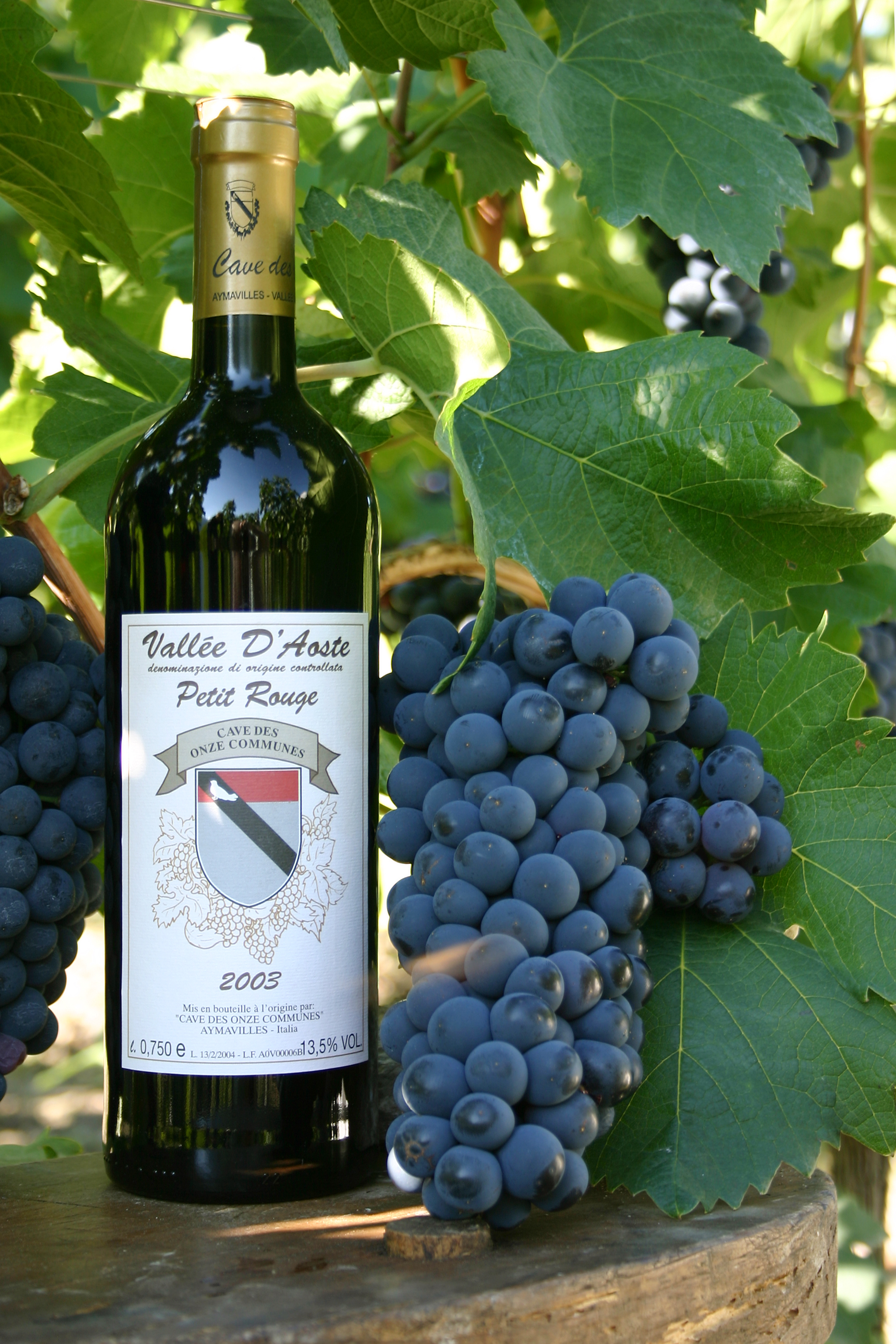
Petit Rouge grapes and a Valle d'Aosta wine produced from the variety.

Petit Rouge is a red Italian wine grape variety that ampelographers believe is indigenous to the Valle d'Aosta (French: Vallée d'Aoste) region of northwest Italy. However, there is some confusion about whether Petit Rouge is the same variety as the red Swiss wine grape Rouge de Valais.

The grape is somewhat obscure and is not widely grown outside the Valle d'Aosta where it is primarily a blending variety but some varietal wines are produced. In blends, it adds floral aroma notes and dark color to the wines.

== Wine regions ==
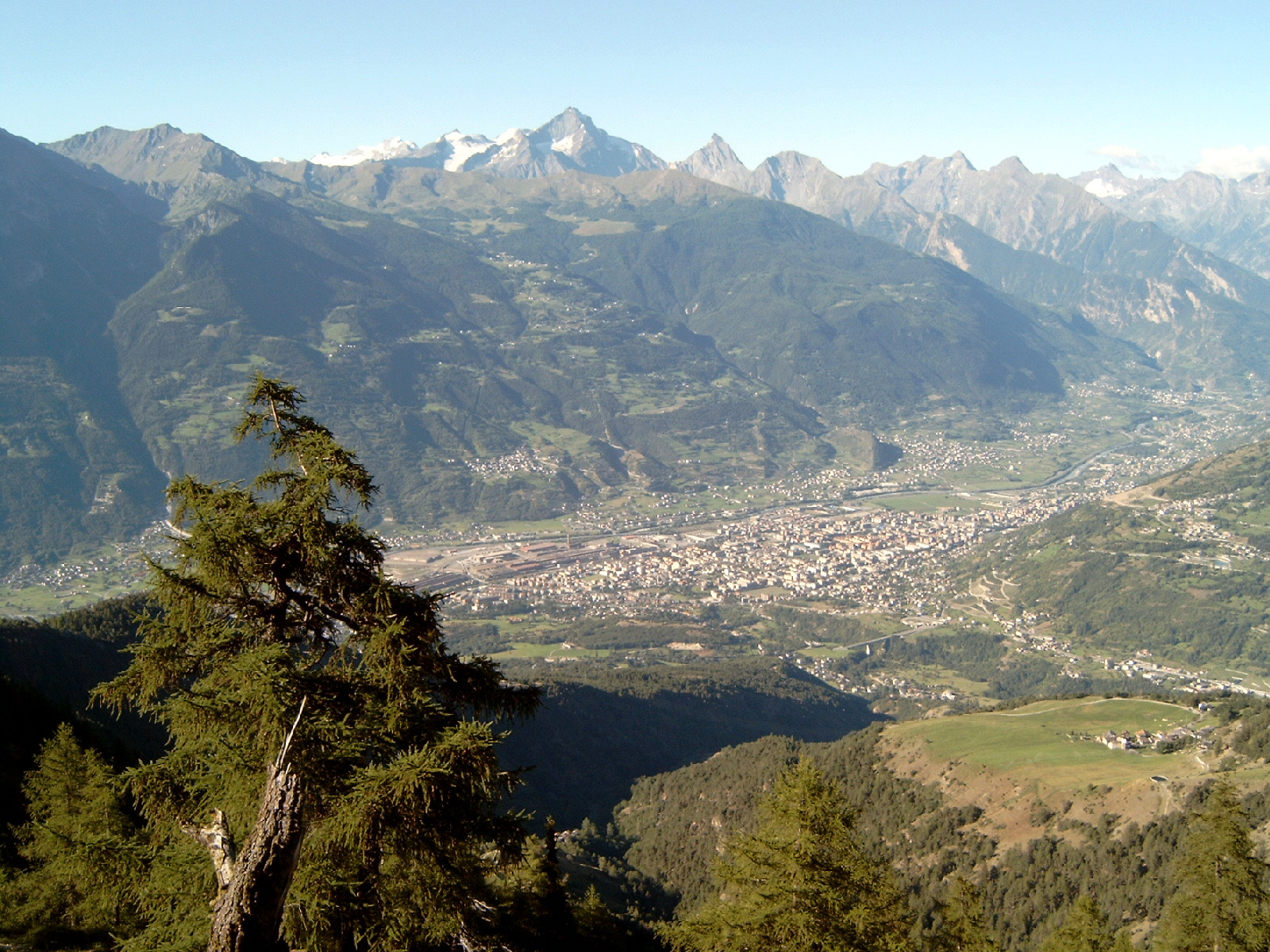
Valle d'Aosta region is surrounded by mountainous terrain but can be very warm and dry during the summer months of the growing season.

Petit Rouge is primarily found in the Valle d'Aosta region of northwest Italy between Piedmont and the Alps separating Italy from France and Switzerland. In general, altitude determines which varieties of grapes may be grown in a particular location, with reds growing at lower elevations and whites at higher elevations. However, despite its high altitude and mountainous location, nearly 90% of the wine in the Valle d'Aosta is red or rosé with Petit Rouge playing a considerable role in many of the blends produced under the Denominazione di Origine Controllata (DOC) designation of the region. This is because the variety thrives during the hot, dry months of the summer, allowing time to develop sufficient sugar levels and physiological ripeness.

=== DOC regulations ===
Within the Valle d'Aosta DOC, Petit Rouge must be harvested below a maximum yield of 12 tonnes/hectare and be fermented to a minimum alcohol level of 9.5%. Prior to release, the wines must be aged a minimum of 6 months which may include some time in oak. Within the larger regional DOC are several smaller DOCs that may also include Petit Rouge. These include:

- Chambave Rosso (French: Chambave rouge)) - Must contain a minimum of 60% Petit Rouge with Dolcetto, Gamay and Pinot noir making up the rest of the blend. Beyond the Valle d'Aosta DOC requirement, Petit Rouge destined for Chambave Rosso must be harvested to a more limited maximum yield of 10 tonnes/ha and be fermented to a minimum 11% alcohol with the six months of aging taking place in wood barrels.
- Enfer d'Arvier - Must contain a minimum of 85% Petit Rouge with Vien de Nus, Neyret, Gamay, Dolcetto and Pinot noir making up the rest of the blend.

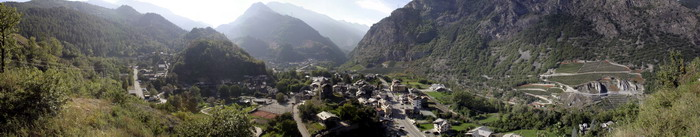
The Arvier valley where Enfer d'Arvier (Enfer is French for "Hell" and refers to the summertime heat of the valley) is produced.

- Nus Rosso (French: Nus rouge)) - Primarily Vien de Nus with up to 40% Petit Rouge blended in along with Pinot noir. Beyond the Valle d'Aosta DOC requirement, Petit Rouge destined for Nus Rosso must be harvested to a more limited maximum yield of 8 tonnes/ha and be fermented to a minimum 11% alcohol with the six months of aging taking place in wood barrels.
- Torrette Must contain a minimum 70% Petit Rouge with Fumin, Dolcetto, Gamay, Neyret, Pinot noir and Vien de Nus making up the rest of the blend. Beyond the Valle d'Aosta DOC requirement, Petit Rouge destined for Torrette must be harvested to a more limited maximum yield of 10 tonnes/ha and be fermented to a minimum 11% alcohol with the six months of aging taking place in wood barrels. An additional Torrette Superiore designation can be applied if the wine spent eight months aging and achieved a minimum alcohol level of 12%.

== Viticulture and winemaking ==
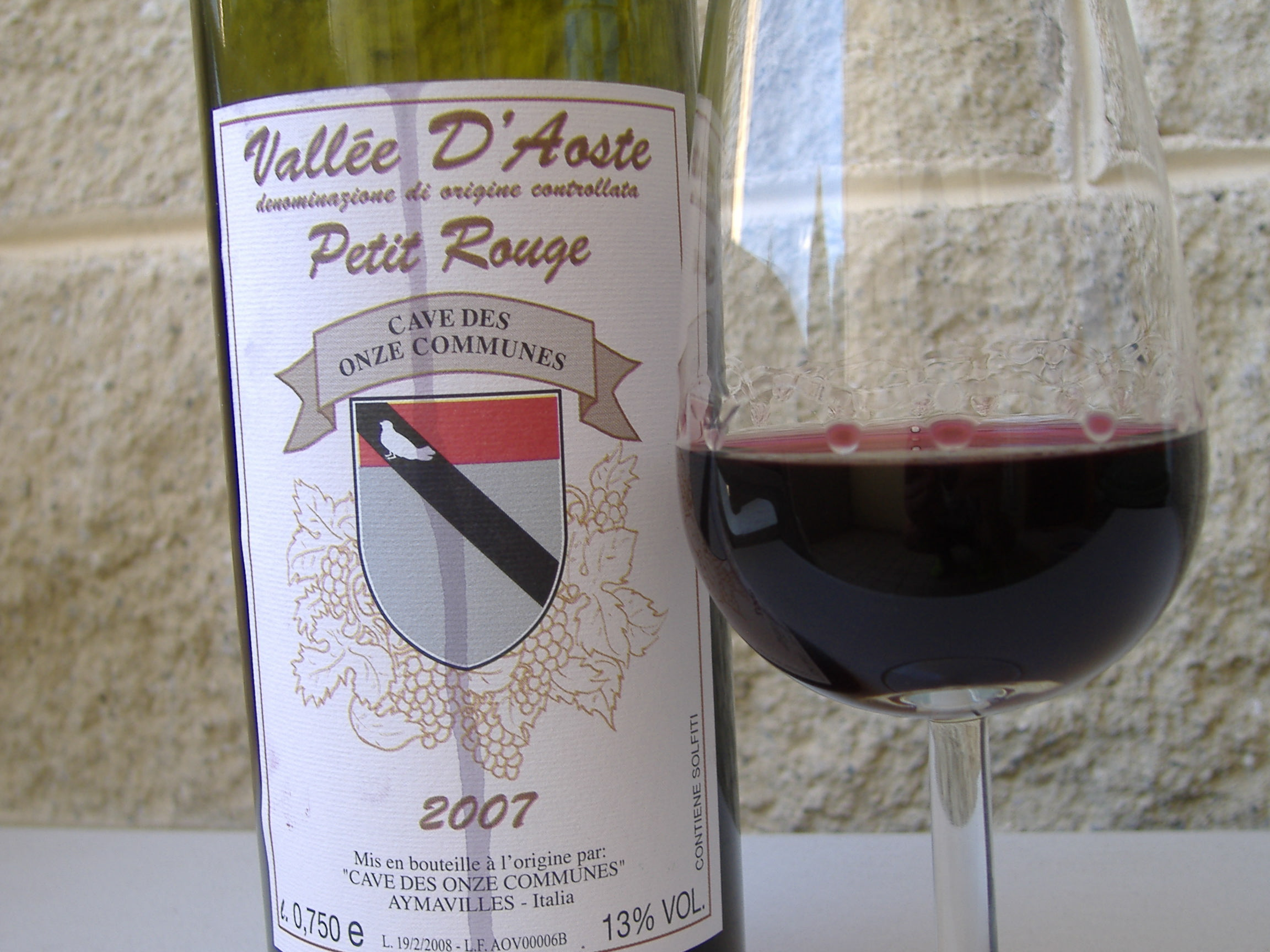
A varietal Petit Rouge from Valle d'Aosta (Cave des onze communes).

Ampelographer can identify the Petit Rouge vine by the small "dusty" colored grapes that, according to wine expert Jancis Robinson, can almost look gray. During the growing season, the variety is late ripening and is often harvested with low levels of acidity. This is one reason why it is often blended where it can improve the color of the usually light-colored Valle d'Aosta wines while adding floral notes to the bouquet.

== Synonyms ==
Over the years Petit Rouge and its wines have been known under various synonyms including Orion gris, Oriou, Oriou Curare, Oriou gris, Oriou Lombard, Oriou Petit-Rouge, Oriou Pitchou, Oriou Voirard, Petit Rouge de Châtillion, Pitchon Roza, Ritchou Oriou, Pitchou Radzo, Pitchou Rouge, Pitchou Rozo, Picciourouzzo, Pitchou Rodza and Ritchou Rouge.
