= San Esteban del Valle =

- municipality
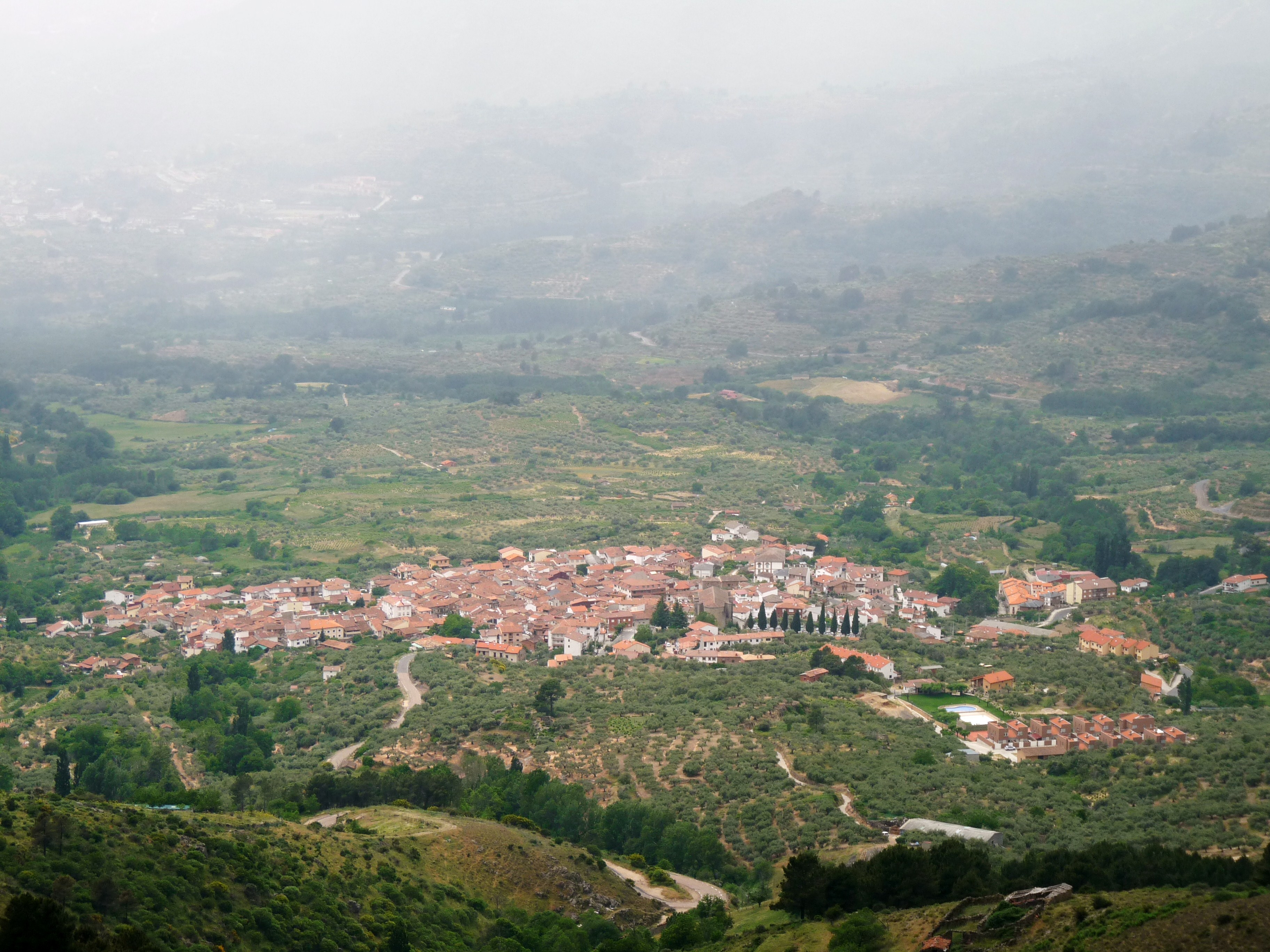

- Flag Coat of arms

- Location in Spain. San Esteban del Valle (Spain)
- Coordinates: 40°16′31″N 4°58′48″W
- Country: Spain
- Autonomous community: Castile and León
- Province: Ávila
- Municipality: San Esteban del Valle

Area
  - Total: 37 km^{2} (14 sq mi)

Population (2025-01-01)
  - Total: 735
  - Density: 20/km^{2} (51/sq mi)
- Time zone: UTC+1 (CET)
  - Summer (DST): UTC+2 (CEST)
- Website: Official website

San Esteban del Valle is a municipality located in the province of Ávila, Castile and León, Spain.

== Population ==
Historical population
Year	Pop.	±% p.a.
2023	745	—
2024	734	−1.48%
2025	735	+0.14%
Source: INE
