= Châtelard Castle, Aosta Valley =

Medieval castle in La Salle, Aosta Valley, Italy

Coordinates: 45°45′23″N 7°03′39″E

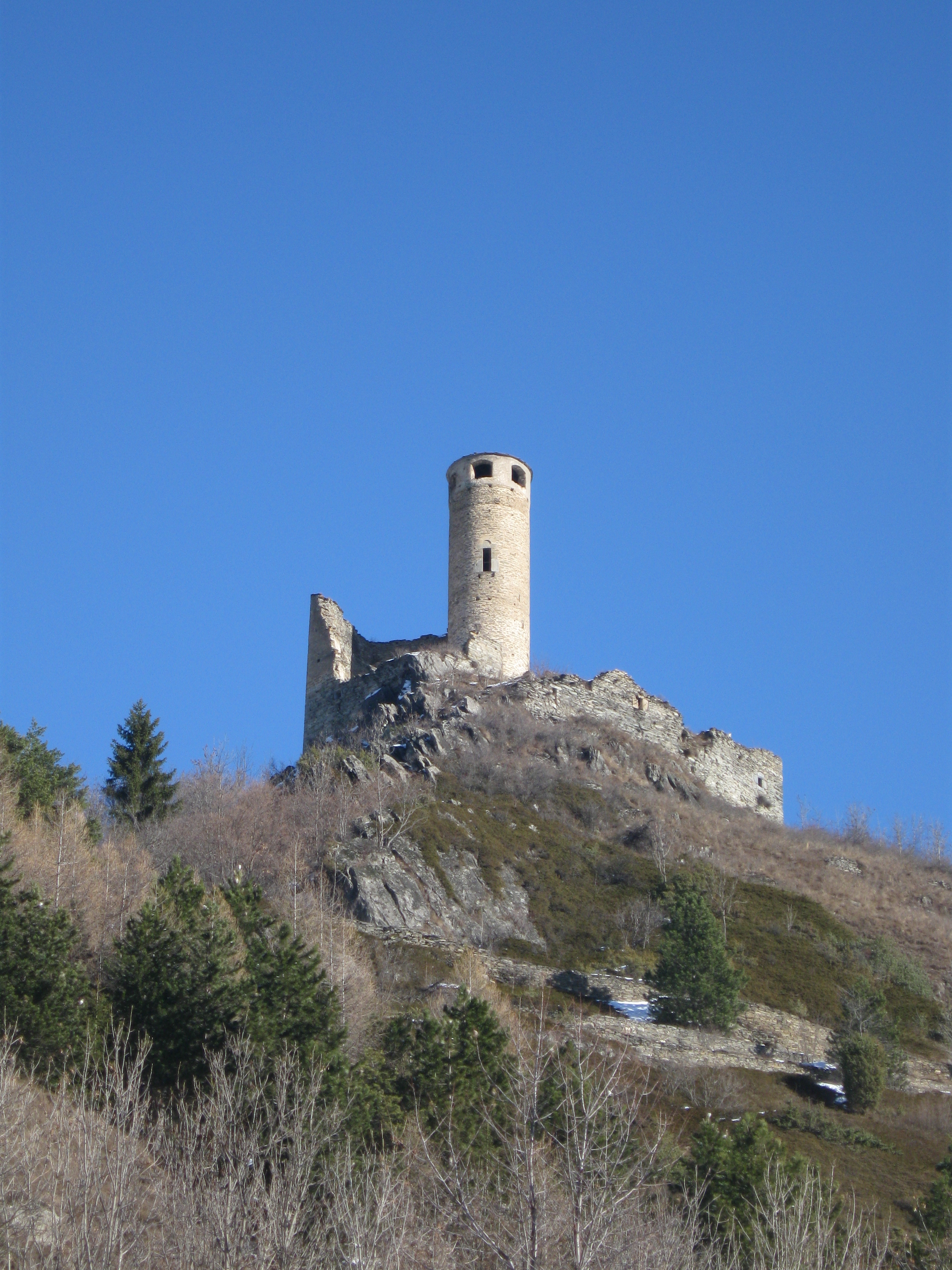
The Châtelard Castle

Châtelard Castle (Italian: Castello di Châtelard, French: Château de Châtelard) is a medieval castle near the town of La Salle in the Aosta Valley region of Italy.

The castle is believed to have been built by Rodolphe Grossi, who was Bishop of Aosta from 1243. The castle is first documented in 1248 and took the form of a circular tower reminiscent of the fortified constructions of Peter II, Count of Savoy, to whom Grossi was a close advisor.
