= Luglienga =

Variety of grape

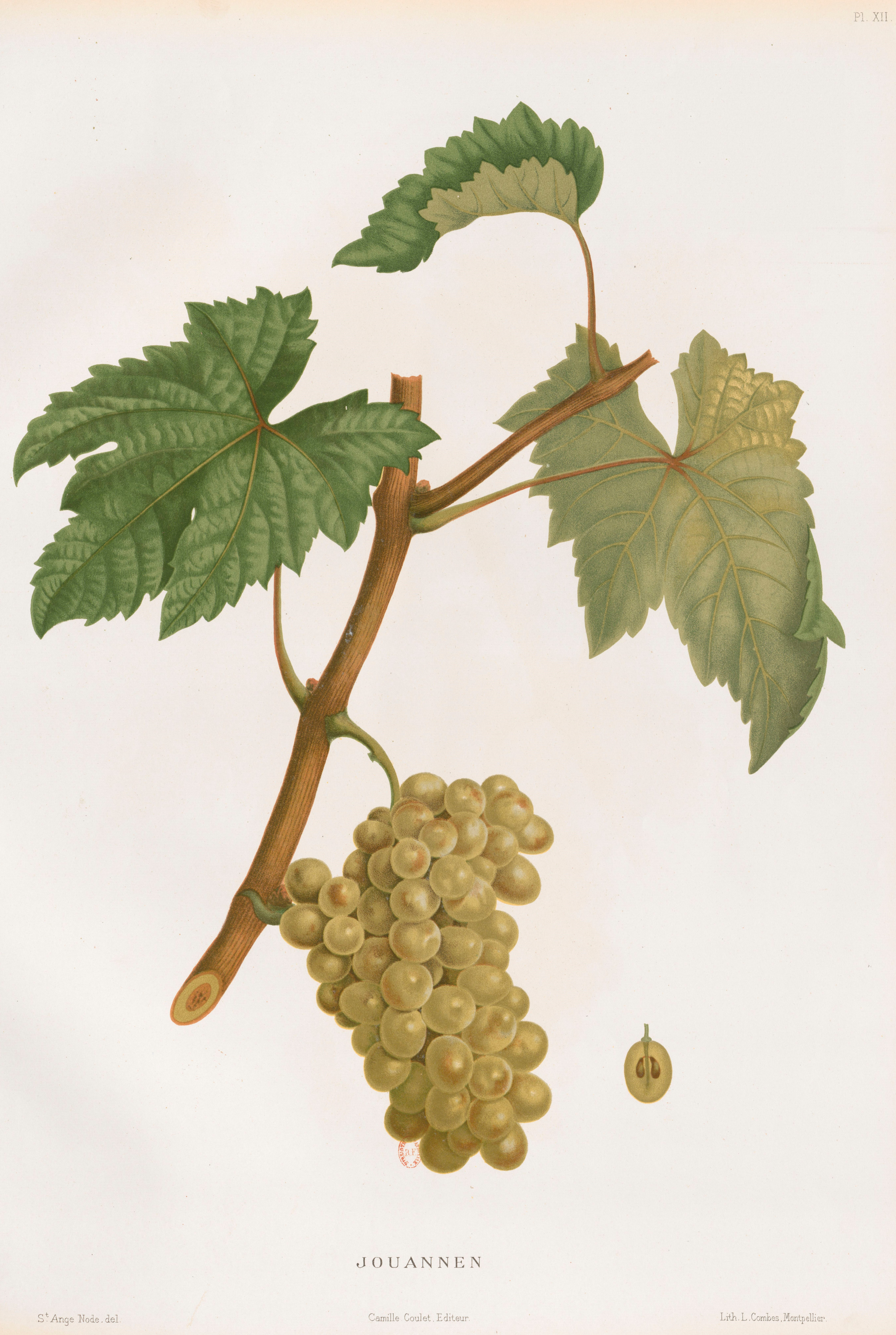
Lithograph of Jouannen (synonym).

Luglienga (also known as Lignan blanc and Seidentraube) is a white Italian wine and table grape variety that is grown across Europe. The grape has a long history of use, dating back to at least the 14th century in Piedmont but is today most seen a table grape that is occasionally used for home winemaking.

== History and relationship to other grapes ==
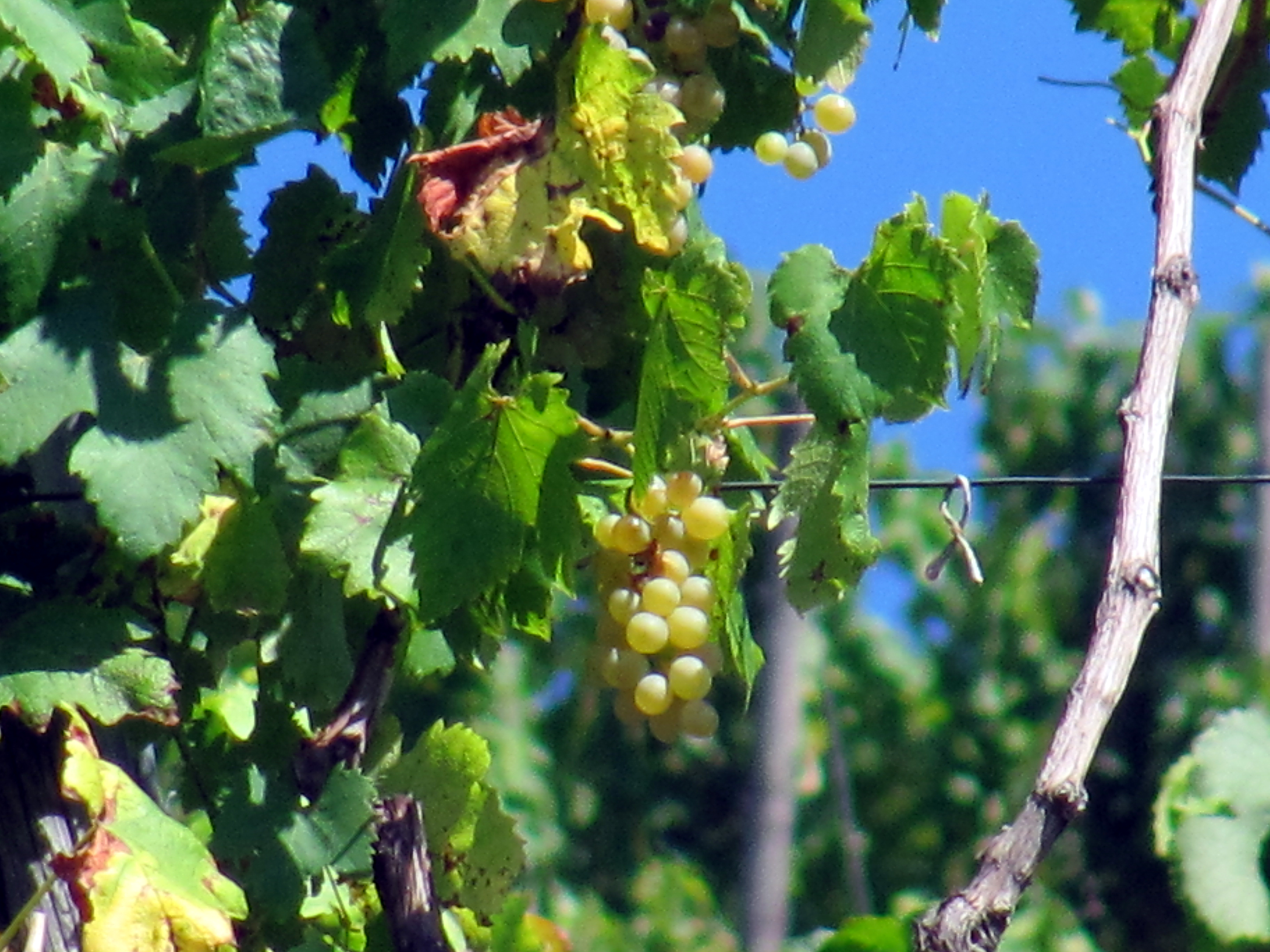
In the early 21st century, DNA analysis showed that Luglienga shared a parent-offspring relationship with Prié blanc (pictured) with Luglienga likely being the parent variety.

The first written documentation of Luglienga dates back to 1329 where it was listed under the old synonym Luglienchis growing in the Piedmont wine region of northwest Italy. Ampelographers believe that the name is derived from the Italian Luglio which means July and could be a reference to the grape's tendency to ripen early in the growing season. The French synonym Jouanenc, derived from juin meaning June also seems to support the grape's reputation as an early ripening variety.

In the early 21st century, DNA analysis confirmed what ampelographers such as Pierre Galet had long suspected--that the German/Swiss wine grape Siedentraube and the French wine grape Lignan blanc were in fact Luglienga. DNA also showed that Luglienga shares a parent-offspring relationship with the Valle d'Aosta wine grape Prié blanc with the older Luglienga likely being the parent variety.

In 1929, Luglienga (as Siedentraube) was crossed with Gamay to create the white German wine grape Regner.

== Viticulture ==
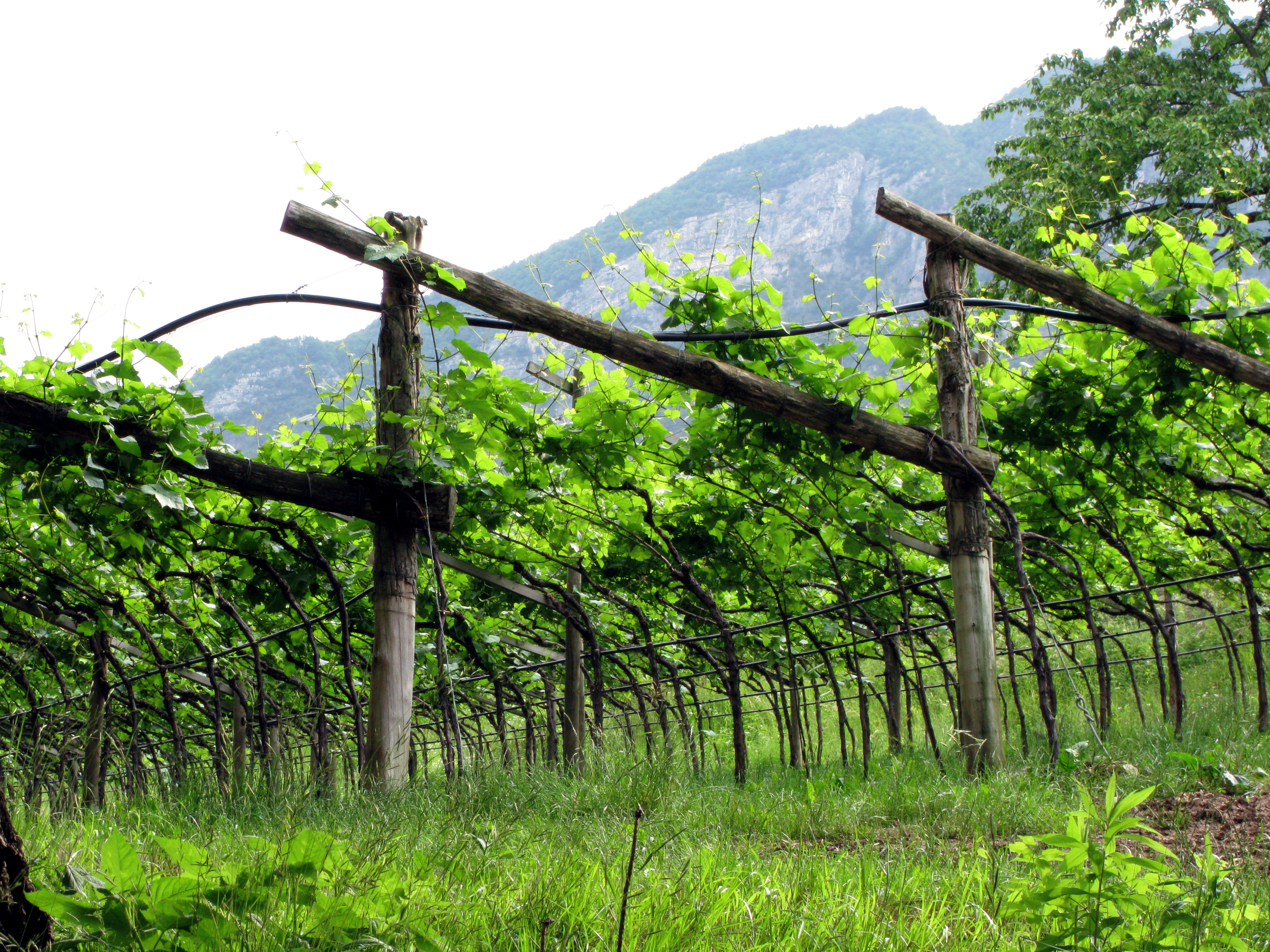
Luglienga is often trained above the ground in pergola systems (example pictured in Trentino).

Luglienga is an early ripening variety that can be very vigorous unless kept in check by wine pruning and leaf pulling. The vine has strong resistance to the viticultural hazard of winter frost but can very susceptible to developing botrytis bunch rot. The grape responds well to being trained in pergolas in front of houses or over gardens.

== Wine regions ==
As a table grape, Luglienga is grown across Europe but is rarely used in winemaking apart from the occasional home winemaker.

== Synonyms ==
Over the years, Luglienga has been known under a variety of synonyms including: Agliana, Agosenga di Aosta, Agostenga, Agostenga di Aosta, Agostinga, Augustaner weiss, Augustauer, Belle Alliance, Blanc de Bovelle, Blanc de Champagne, Blanc de Pagès, Blanc précoce de Kientzheim, Blussard weiss, Blussart weiss, Bona in Ca (in the Trentino wine region), Budazgoher, Buona in casa, Burchardt’s Amber Cluster, Busby’s Golden Hamburgh, Champion Dore, Charnu, Early Kientzheim, Early Leipzig, Early Green Madeira, Early White Malvasia, Fresa di Mensa, Frueher Grosser Malvasier, Frueher Grosser Gelber Malvasier, Frueher Leipziger, Frueher Orléans, Fruehweisse Zibede, Gelbe Seidentraube, Gosvabne Zhelte, Golden Hamburgh, Gros blanc, Grove End Sweetwater, Guštana (in Slovenia), Hedvábné žluté, Hodvábne žlté, Joannen Charnu, Joanenc, Joannenc, Jouanen, Jouanenc (in France), Jouannenc, Jouannene, Juanen, Julliatique blanche, Karmelitanka bijela, Kientsheim, Krim ai Izium, Krim ai Izyum, Krym ai Izyum, Krymskii Rannii Vinograd, Lignan, Lignan blanc (in France), Lignenga (in Piedmont), Lilanica, Limian, Linian, Linian belii, Linian Belyi, Linyan, Linyan Belyi, Lugiadega, Ligiana bianca, Lugliata, Lugliatica (in Piedmont), Luglienca, Luglienco bianco, Luglienga, Luglienga bianka, Luglienga bianca, Luglienga verde, Luglienchis, Lugliolina, Lugliota, Lulienga, Luigese (in Liguria), Madalénen, Madeleine Alb, Madeleine blanche, Madeleine verte de la Dorée, Madlen belii, Madlen Belii Rannii, Margit Fegher, Margit féher, Margit Korai Feher, Meslier, Précoce de Hongrie, Précoce du Vaucluse, Pulsar Belyi, Pulsart blanc, Ragusaner weiss, Raisin de la Saint-Jean, Raisin de Vilmorin, Ranka, Rognaneau, Rumamellas, Saint John‘s, San Jacopo, Santa Anna di Lipsia, Seidentraube (in Germany and Switzerland), Seidentraube Gelb, Selkovaia Kist, Shelkovaya Kist, St. Anna di Lipsia, Uva Buona in Casa, Uva Pastora, Uva di Sant'Anna (in Piedmont), Vert Précoce de Madère, Vigriega, Waelsch Gelb and Weisser Kilianer.
