= Morgex =

Morgex Mordzé (Valdôtain)
- Comune
- Comune di Morgex; Commune de Morgex
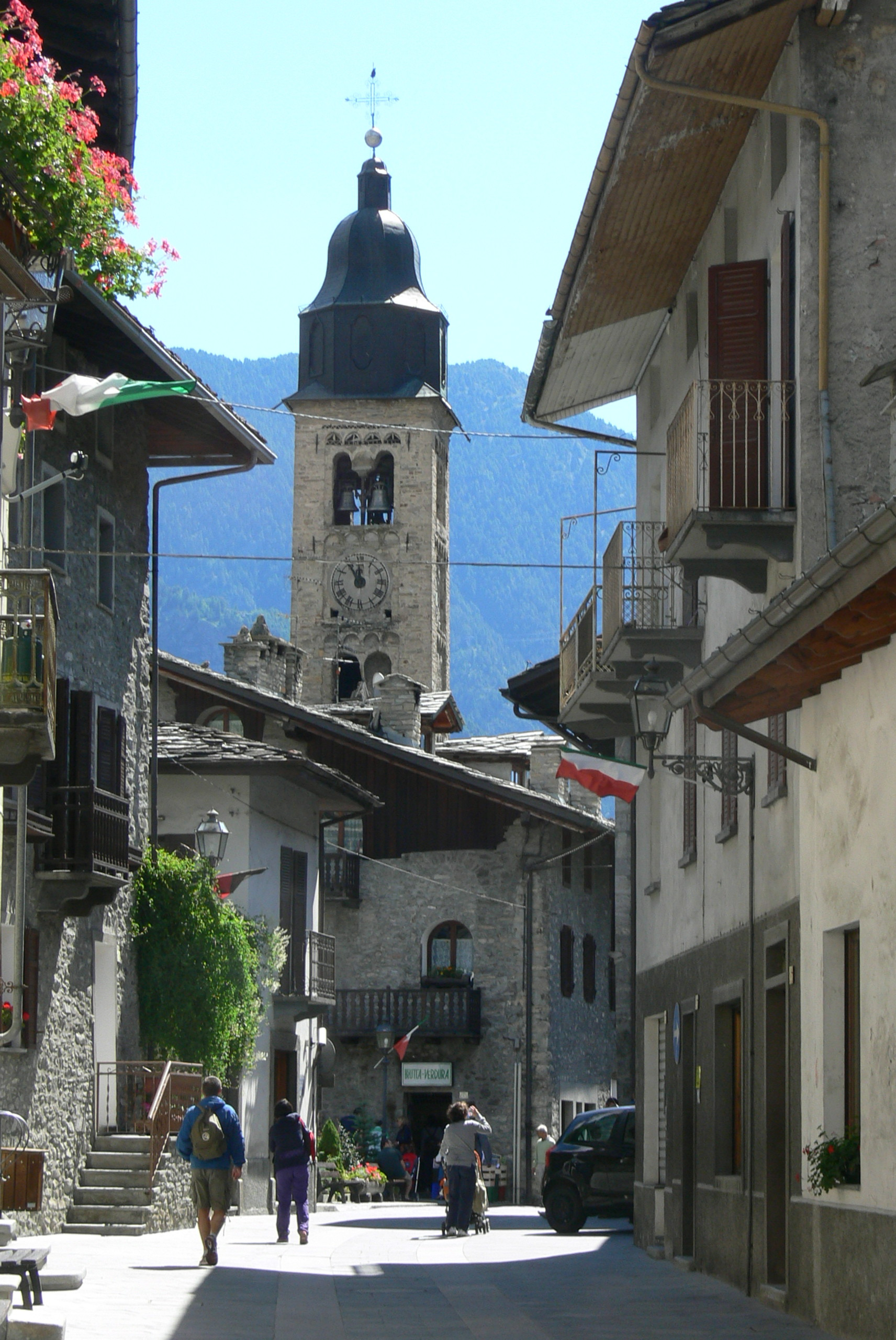
- Rue du Valdigne, Morgex main pedestrian street

- Location within Italy Location within Aosta Valley
- Coordinates: 45°45′N 7°02′E
- Country: Italy
- Region: Aosta Valley
- Frazioni: Arpy, Biolley, Dailley, Fosseret, Lavancher, La Ruine, Marais, Montet, Pautex, Ruillard, Tirivel, Villair

Area
  - Total: 43 km^{2} (17 sq mi)
- Elevation: 923 m (3,028 ft)

Population (31 December 2022)
  - Total: 2,053
  - Density: 48/km^{2} (120/sq mi)
- Demonym: Morgeassins
- Time zone: UTC+1 (CET)
  - Summer (DST): UTC+2 (CEST)
- Postal code: 11017
- Dialing code: 0165
- Website: Official website

Morgex French pronunciation (Valdôtain: Mordzé) is a town and comune in the Aosta Valley region of north-western Italy. High quality white wine is produced in the area, and it is home to the last few plantings of the very rare pink grape, Roussin de Morgex.

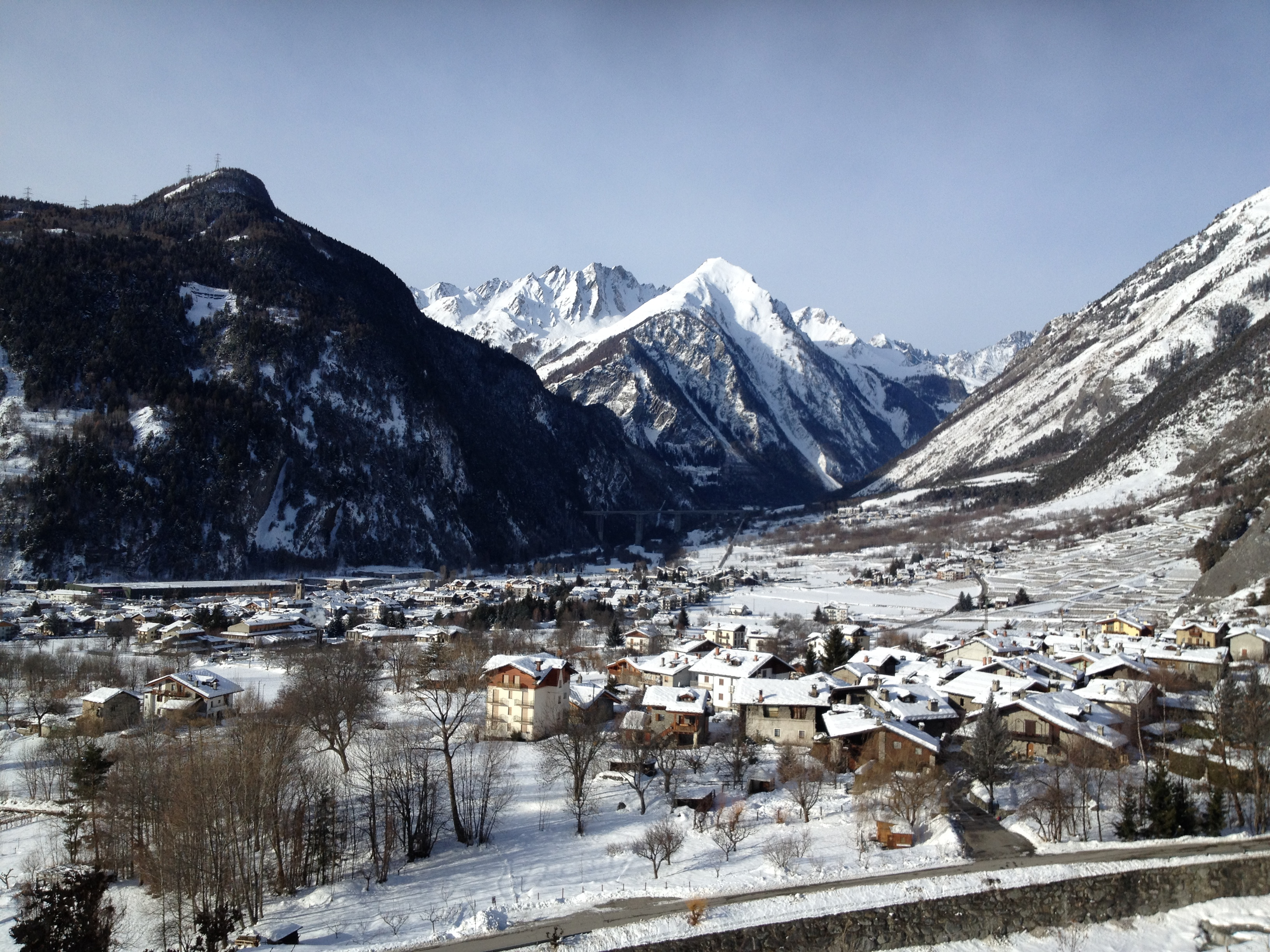
Morgex in winter from the Tsantamerla area
