= Chambave =

Chambave Tschambava/Tsambava (Valdôtain) Tschambuvu (Walser)
- Comune
- Comune di Chambave; Commune de Chambave
- Coat of arms

- Location within Italy Location within Aosta Valley
- Coordinates: 45°45′N 7°33′E
- Country: Italy
- Region: Aosta Valley
- Frazioni: Arlier, Septumian, Margnier, Valléry, Thuy, Verthuy, Tercy, Poyaz, Parléaz, Clapey, Aier, Champlan, Jovençanaz, Praz, Promassaz, Ronchère, Champagne, Chandianaz, Cesséyaz, Pilliolet, La Poya, Moncharey, Croux, Guichet, Ollières, Goillaz, Les Fosses, Grenellaz, La Méyaz, Perret, La Plantaz, Protorgnet

Government
  - Mayor: Elio Chatrian

Area
  - Total: 21 km^{2} (8.1 sq mi)
- Elevation: 480 m (1,570 ft)

Population (31 December 2022)
  - Total: 875
  - Density: 42/km^{2} (110/sq mi)
- Demonym: Chambosard
- Time zone: UTC+1 (CET)
  - Summer (DST): UTC+2 (CEST)
- Postal code: 11023
- Dialing code: 0166
- Patron saint: Saint Lawrence
- Saint day: 10 August

Chambave (French: [ʃɑ̃bav]; Valdôtain: Tschambava or Tsambava; Issime Walser: Tschambuvu) is a town and comune in the Aosta Valley region of northwestern Italy.

The communal territory is crossed by the Dora Baltea (French: Doire baltée).

== Wine ==
Growers in Chambave produce several Italian wines under the Valle d'Aosta DOC including a rosso, sweet wine Muscat and a straw wine.

- Chambave rouge - Must contain a minimum of 60% Petit Rouge with Dolcetto, Gamay and Pinot noir making up the rest of the blend. Beyond the Vallée d'Aoste DOC requirement, grapes destined for Chambave rouge must be harvested to a more limited maximum yield of 10 tonnes/ha and be fermented to a minimum 11% alcohol with the six months of aging taking place in wood (usually oak) barrels.
- Muscat de Chambave - Sweet white made from the Muscat de Chambave grape. Harvested to a maximum yield of 10 tonnes/ha and fermented to a minimum alcohol level of 11% with three months aging in wood.
- Muscat de Chambave flétri - Straw wine produced from Muscat de Chambave grapes that have been left to dry into raisins and then fermented to a minimum alcohol level of 16.5% with two years of aging in wood.

== Twin towns – sister cities ==
Chambave is twinned with:

- Saint-Laurent-de-Mure, France
