= Nus, Aosta Valley =

Nus
- Comune
- Comune di Nus; Commune de Nus
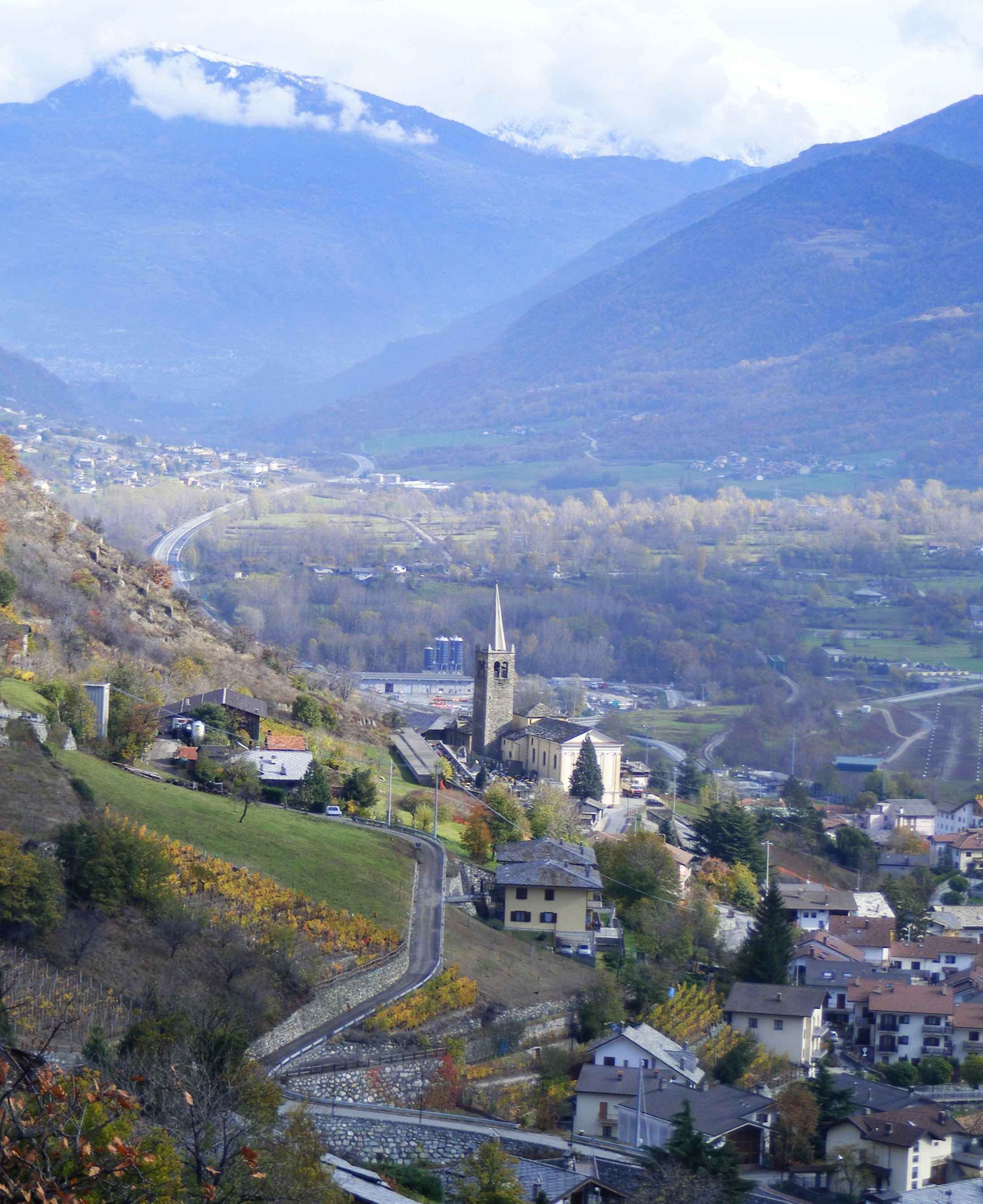

- Coat of arms

- Location within Italy Location within Aosta Valley
- Coordinates: 45°44′N 7°28′E
- Country: Italy
- Region: Aosta Valley
- Province: none
- Frazioni: Arlian, Blavy, Champagne, Clémensod, Cret, Fognier, Issologne, La Plantaz, Lavanche, Lignan, Mandollaz, Marsan, Martinet, Mazod, Messigné, Petit-Fénis, Pesse, Plane, Plaisant, Plantayes, Porliod, Praille, Praz, Ronchettes, Rovarey, Sacquignod, Tolasèche, Val, Vénoz

Area
  - Total: 57.38 km^{2} (22.15 sq mi)
- Elevation: 529 m (1,736 ft)

Population (31 December 2022)
  - Total: 2,983
  - Density: 51.99/km^{2} (134.6/sq mi)
- Demonym: Neuveins
- Time zone: UTC+1 (CET)
  - Summer (DST): UTC+2 (CEST)
- Postal code: 11020
- Dialing code: 0165
- ISTAT code: 7045
- Patron saint: Hilary of Poitiers
- Saint day: 13 January
- Website: Official website

Nus (French: [nys]) is a town and comune in the Aosta Valley region of northern Italy.

== See also ==
- Vien de Nus
