= Fumin (grape) =

Variety of grape

Fumin is a red Italian wine grape variety that is grown primarily in the Valle d'Aosta region of northwest Italy. According to wine expert Jancis Robinson, the grape is "tough" and used primarily as a blending grape in the Denominazione di origine controllatas (DOCs) of the region. The grape is one of the parent varieties of the Aosta wine grape Vuillermin.
