= Betu =

Betu may refer to:

- Roberto Linck or "Betu" (born 1988), a professional soccer player and owner of Miami Dade FC
- A synonym of Étraire de la Dui, a variety of grape
- Betu, Iran, a village in Razavi Khorasan Province, Iran
