= Persan (grape) =

Variety of grape

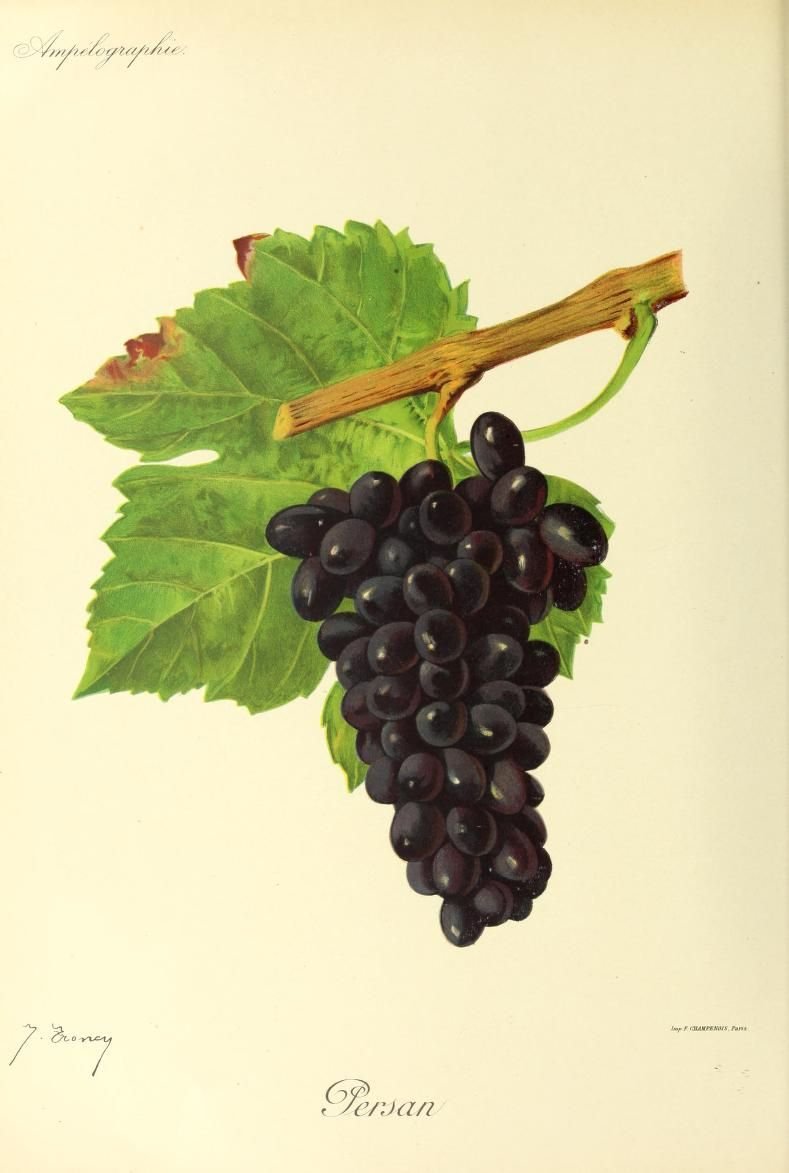
Persan as illustrated by Viala & Vermorel

Persan is a red French wine grape variety that is grown primarily in the Savoie region. While the name hints at a Persian origins for the grape, it is most likely native to the Rhône-Alpes region with the name "Persan" being a corruption of the synonym "Princens" which is also the name of a small hamlet by Saint-Jean-de-Maurienne in Savoie which has been noted since the 17th century for the quality of its vineyards.

== History ==
The exact origins of Persan is unknown. The name of the grape lends itself to the theory that it originated in the Middle East and worked its way west via Cyprus. One legend has it that Prince Louis of Savoy had the vine brought to France from Cyprus, where he reigned as king in the 15th century. Another theory that Master of Wine Jancis Robinson puts forth is that the name Persan is a corruption of Princens which combined two words from the local dialect meaning prin (or prime) and cens (a fee due to landowners from their vassals). Records indicate in the 17th century there was a vineyard located in the small hamlet of Princens by Saint-Jean-de-Maurienne east of Grenoble that was highly regarded and could have been home to the "Princens" grape that late became known as Persan.

The earliest mention of the name Persan itself occurred in 1846 when Albin Gras, then secretary of the Statistical Society of Isère and a board member for the Agricultural Society of Grenoble, noted plantings of the variety in the Isère department. Gras said that the grape was known as Etraire on the right bank of the Isère and as Persan on the left bank.

== Viticulture ==
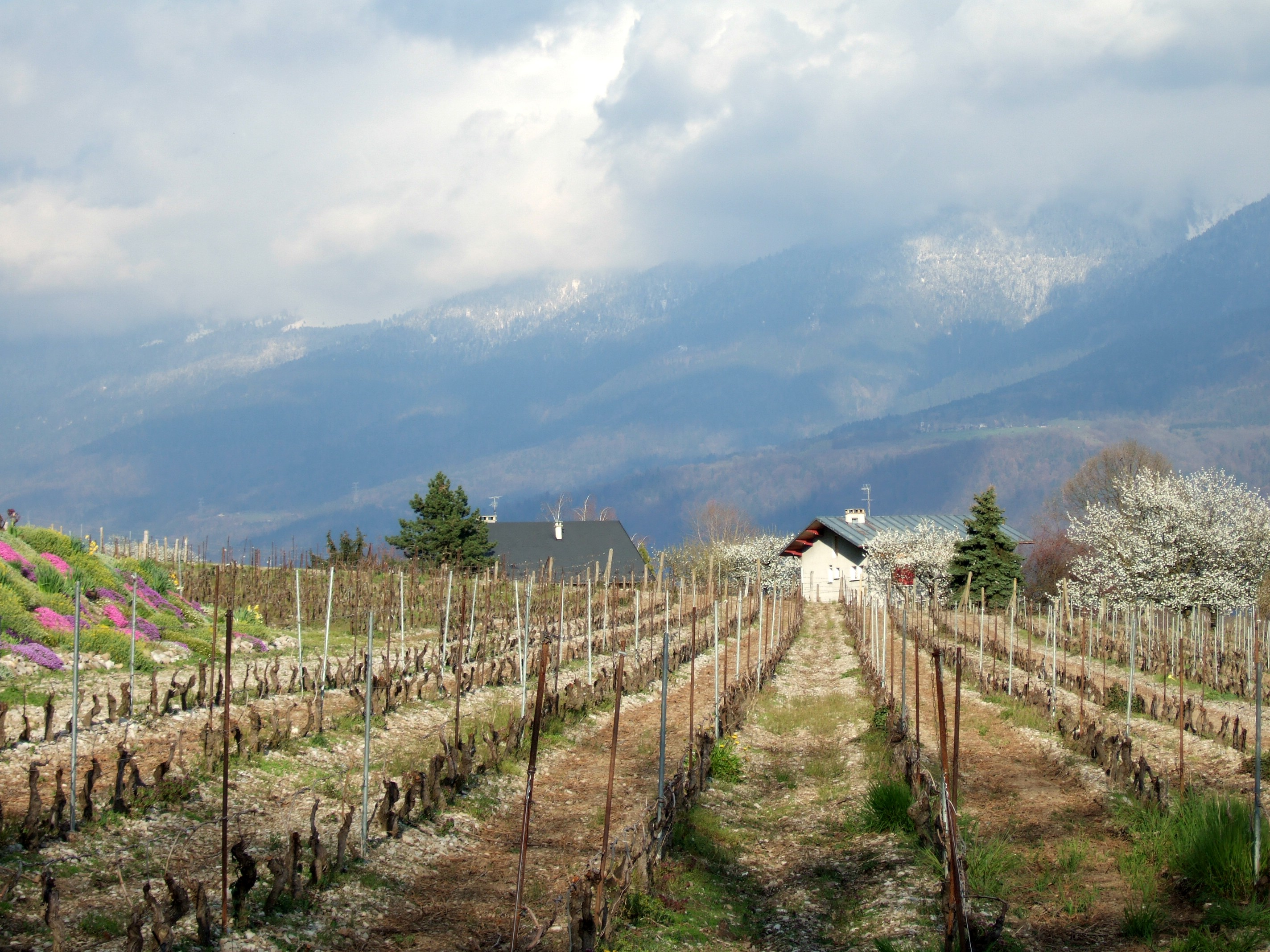
The Savoie region in the Rhone-Alpes region where Persan is thought to have originated from.

Persan is known as an early budding, mid-ripening vine that produces small bunches of tiny berries. It can be very vigorous and usually needs to be pruned heavily in order to maintain reasonable yields. The vines seems to thrive particularly well on stony, calcareous soils with the main viticultural hazard being a susceptibility to powdery and downy mildew.

== Wine regions ==
In the 19th century, Persan was widely planted throughout the Savoie region and Isère region until the phylloxera epidemic at the end of that century greatly reduced its numbers. It is still found in the Savoie region today where it is a permitted variety in the appellation d'Origine Contrôlée wines of the Vin de Savoie AOC as well as the Vin de Pays d'Allobrogie zone but plantings were down to just 22 acres (9 hectares) in 2012. There have been some efforts to revive the variety with Michel Grisard of Domaine Prieuré St-Christophe in Fréterive increasing his planting to make a varietal style of the grape. Grisard, along with other local Savoie producers such as Domaine de Méjane and Domaine Saint-Germain have also been spearheading a local movement to have Persan replanted in the esteemed Princens vineyard of Saint-Jean-de-Maurienne.

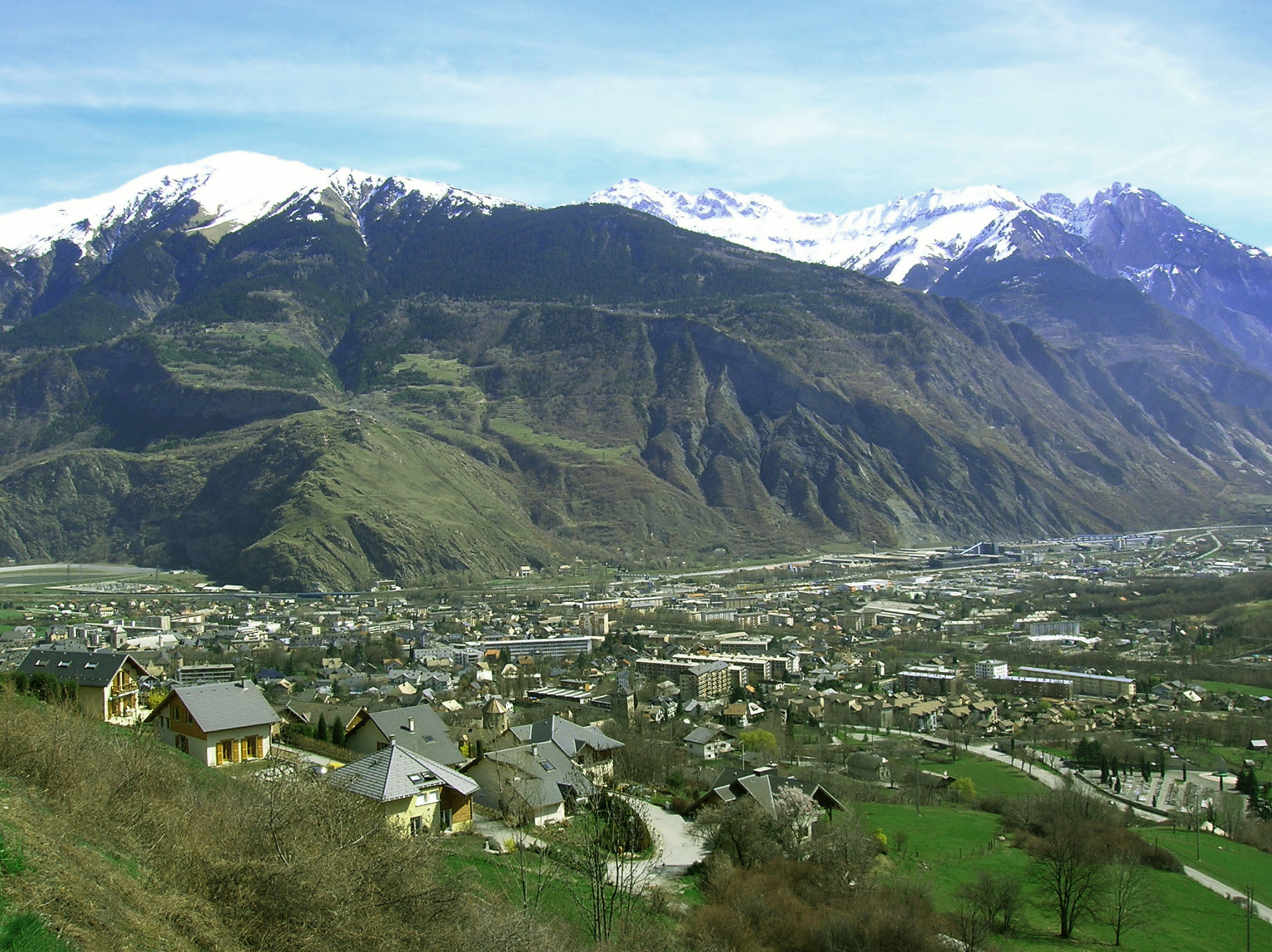
The Savoie commune of Saint-Jean de Maurienne where efforts are underway to replant Persan in the historic Princens vineyard.

Across the border from Savoie in Switzerland, more than 1500 vines of Persan were planted in a vineyard outside Geneva that should be in full production by the 2016 vintage.

In 2001, DNA testing confirmed that the local Bécuet grape growing in the Susa Valley of Piedmont around Pinerolo was, in fact, the Persan grape of Savoie. Today it is often blended with the local grape variety Avanà to make a wine known as Ramiè. Some varietal examples of Bécuet are also made in the province of Turin in the communes of Gravere and Giaglione.

== Confusion with and relationship to other varieties ==
Due to the similarities in synonyms it was long thought that Persan was the same grape as Étraire de la Dui which is also found in the Savoie wine region. In 1902, L. Rougier, an ampelographer writing for Pierre Viala and Victor Vermorel's catalog of grape varieties, determined that the two were separate varieties with Étraire de la Dui likely being an offspring of Persan. Over 100 years later, DNA testing conducted by Swiss geneticist José Vouillamoz "strongly suggested" that there was, indeed, a parent-offspring link between Persan and Étraire de la Dui but in what direction (i.e. who is the parent and who is the offspring) is not yet known.

Other varieties that Persan has been confused with over the years include Mondeuse noire, Syrah and Pinot noir. In 1876, French viticulturist Jules Guyot even speculated that Persan may have been a local mutation of the Burgundian Pinot noir that developed in Savoie. However, DNA testing has dismissed that theory.

Persan was used to crossed with Peloursin to create the red grape variety Joubertin.

== Synonyms ==
Over the years Persan has been known under a variety of synonyms including Aguyzelle, Aguzelle, Bâtarde, Bâtarde longue, Beccu (in Savoie), Becouet, Becuet (also spelled as Bécuet or Becuét in the Val di Susa region of Piedmont), Becuette (sometimes spelled as Bécuette), Begu, Berla'd Crava Cita, Berla Cita, Berlo Citto (in the Val Chisone region of Piedmont), Biquet, Bucuet, Cul de Poule, Étraire (in Isère), Étrière, Étris (in Isère), Guzelle, Moirans, Persan Noir, Petit Becquet, Posse de Chèvre, Pousse de Chèvre, Presan, Pressan, Princens (in Savoie), Prinsan, Prinssens, Rives, Sérine (in Isère), Sérinne pointue, Siranèze pointue, Siranne (in Isère) and Siranne pointue.
