= Rèze =

Variety of grape

Rèze is a white Swiss wine grape variety that is primarily found around the city of Sierre in the canton of Valais in southwest Switzerland. Here the variety is used to produce vin des glaciers—a sherry-style wine that utilizes a solera system of wine stored in larch wood or oak barrels that are never fully emptied with newer vintages being added to the barrels containing the older vintages.

Despite its historical use in the production of vin des glaciers, its plantings have nonetheless been declining over the last century and now the variety is almost extinction.

In the 21st century, DNA profiling determined that Rèze is likely one of the parent varieties to the Piedmont wine grape Cascarolo bianco and the Trentino wine grapes Nosiola and Groppello di Revò.

== Synonyms ==
Over the years Rèze has been known under a variety of synonyms including Petit Prié Tardif, Reize verte, Réze verte, Rèzi and Resi.
