= Avanà =

Variety of grape

Avanà is a red Italian wine grape variety that is grown in the Piedmont wine region of northwest Italy. Historically, the grape has also been grown in the Dauphiné and Savoie wine region of eastern France where it was known as Hibou noir and in the Valais region of Switzerland. The grape is most often used as a blending variety in the Denominazione di origine controllata (DOC) zones of Pinerolese, with Barbera, Persan, Freisa and Neretta Cuneese, and Valsusa, with Barbera, Dolcetto, Neretta Cuneese and other local red Piemontese varieties.

== History ==
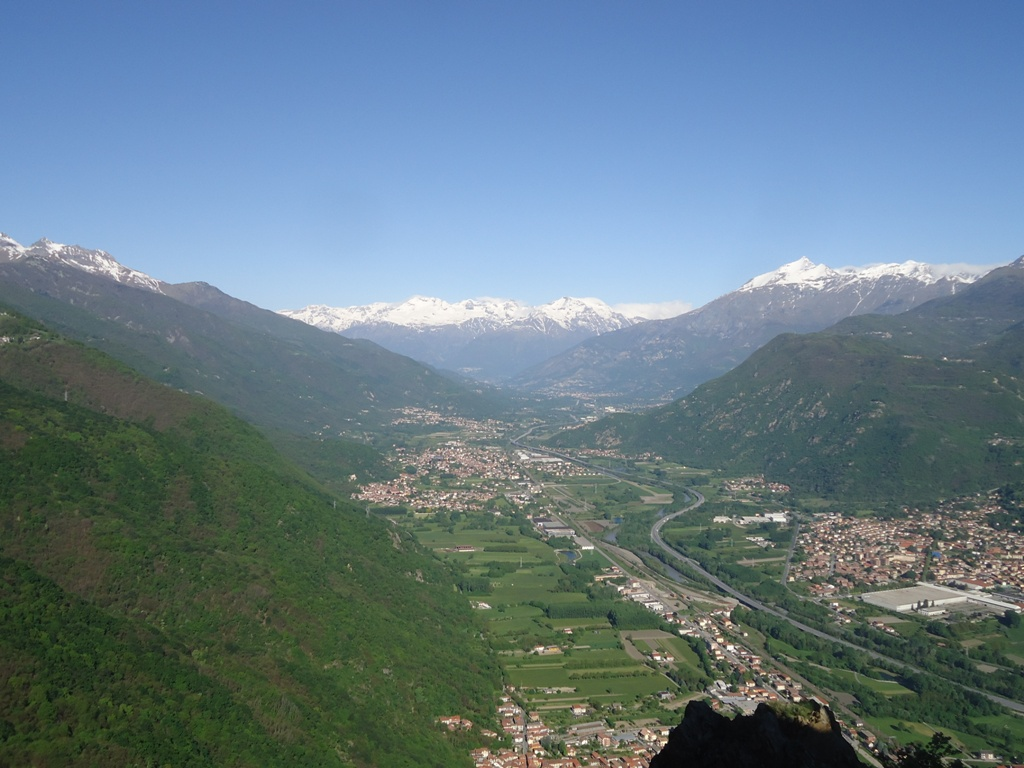
The Susa Valley, where Avanà has a long history of production.

Ampelographers believe that the first written mention of Avanà was under the synonym Avanato in the 1606 work of Italian agronomist Giovanni Battista Croce on the grapes of the Piedmont region. In the early 21st century, DNA analysis revealed that the Hibou noir grape was historically grown in what is today the Savoie region of France and Valais region of Switzerland was, in fact, the same Avanà grape that is still grown in the Susa Valley of Piedmont. From 1418 to 1713, Piedmont, Savoie and Valais were all part of the Duchy of Savoy and it is likely during this time that Avanà was introduced to each region though today the grape is mostly only found in Piedmont.

DNA analysis also revealed that Avanà has a close parent-offspring relationship with the Savoie wine grape Cacaboué. The Swiss wine grape Amigne also appears to be closely related to Avanà though the exact nature of the relationship (which can be anything from half-sibling to niece/nephew to grandparent/grandchild) is not yet known.

== Viticulture ==
Avanà is an early to mid-ripening grape variety that is known for given very highly irregular harvest yields from vintage to vintage. Among the viticultural hazards that the grape is most susceptible to is the fungal infection of powdery mildew.

== Wine regions ==
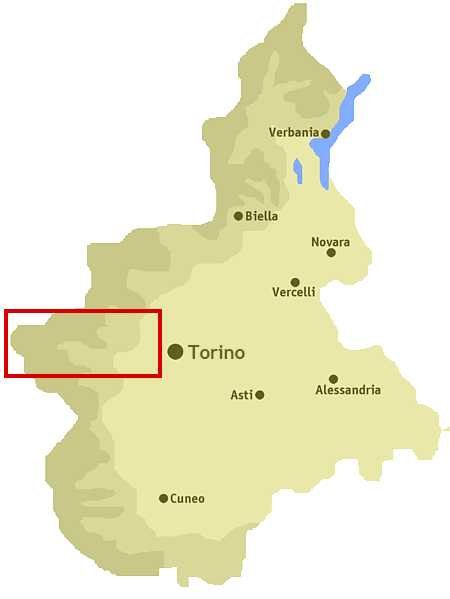
Location of the Susa Valley within Piedmont.

Today, Avanà is found almost exclusively in the Susa Valley region of Piedmont that links the city of Turin to the French wine region Savoie across the Alps. In 2000, there were 30 hectares (74 acres) of the grape variety in cultivation where it has been a permitted grape variety in the red blends of the Pinerolese (since 1996) and Valsusa (since 1997) DOCs.

=== DOC regulations ===
In the red wine only DOC of Pinerolese located in the provinces of Cuneo and Turin, Avanà grapes destined for DOC wine production must be limited to a harvest yield of 10 tonnes/hectare with the finished wines needing to attain minimum alcohol level of at least 10.5%. Wines labeled as just Pinerolese must contain a minimum of 50% of Barbera, Bonarda Piemontese, Nebbiolo and Neretta Cuneese with Avanà and other local red Piemontese varieties permitted to fill in the remainder of the blend.

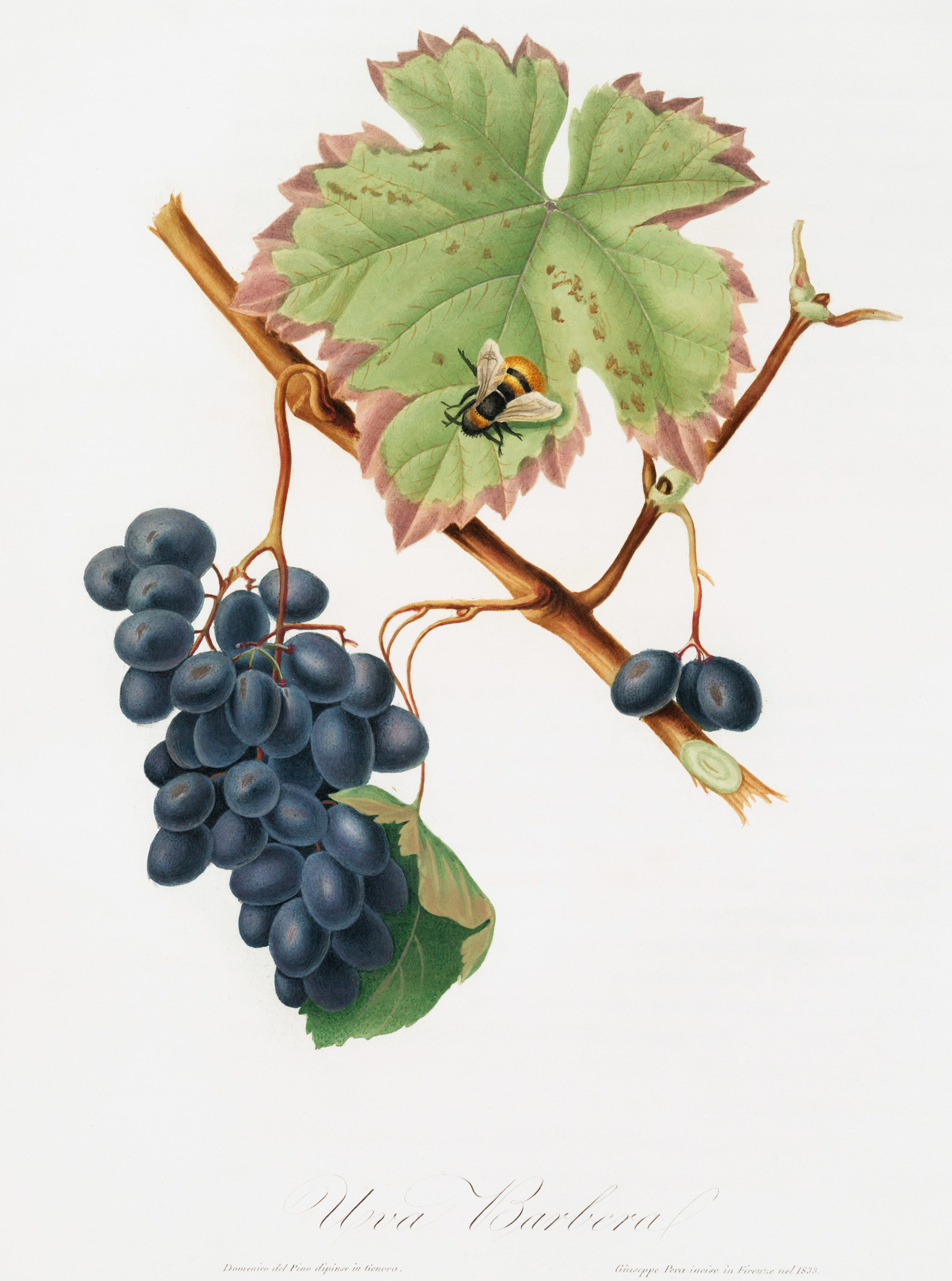
Barbera (pictured) is a common blending partner with Avanà.

For Pinerolese Ramie, Avanà must make up a minimum of 30% of the blend with Avarengo and Neretta Cuneese required to make up an additional minimum of 15% and 20% of the blend, respectively, with other red wine grapes permitted to account up to a maximum of 35%. Additionally, a varietal style of Avanà can be produced within the 80 hectares (200 acres) of the DOC provided that the grape makes up at least 85% of the wine.

The red wine only Valsusa DOC covers Avanà grown within 19 small rural communities between the villages of Almese and Exilles in the Susa Valley in the province of Turin. In 2000, there were only 9 hectares (22 acres) of grapes in production within the DOC. Here grapes are limited to a maximum harvest yield of 9 tonnes/ha with the finished wines needing to attain a minimum alcohol level of at least 11%. The blend for the DOC wines must contain a 60% minimum collectively of Avanà, Barbera, Dolcetto and/or Nebbiolo with other local red grape varieties permitted to fill in the remainder.

== Styles ==
According to Master of Wine Jancis Robinson, as a varietal, Avanà tends to produce light-bodied wines with moderate acidity levels and low tannins that are meant to be consumed young rather than cellared.

== Synonyms ==
Over the years, Avanà has been known under a variety of synonyms including: Alvana di Susa, Avana, Avana de Susa, Avana di Susa, Avana nero, Avanale, Avanas, Avanato, Avanè, Avane, Avenà, Avena, Avenai, Bibou, Davana, Eyholzer Roter, Guibou, Havana, Hibou, Hibou noir (in the Isère and Hautes-Alpes departments of France), Hivernais, Hyvernais, Luisant, Palofrais, Polafrais, Polofrais, Pometre, Promeche, Promere Raisin Cerise, Ribou and Vermaglio (in the town of Saluzzo in Piedmont).
