= Mosto =

Mosto may refer to:

- Mosto, a synonym for Avarengo, an Italian red wine grape variety
- Italian destroyer Antonio Mosto, an Italian naval ship
