= Cascarolo bianco =

Variety of grape

Cascarolo bianco is a white Italian wine grape variety that is grown primarily in the Piedmont wine region of northwest Italy. The grape has a long history in the region and was noted in 1606 by Giovanni Battista Croce, vineyard owner and official jeweler to Charles Emmanuel I, Duke of Savoy, as growing in the hills around Turin and producing wine of high esteem. It was once thought that Cascarolo bianco was the same variety as the Hungarian wine grape Fehér Gohér (also known as Augster Weisser) but DNA profiling in the early 21st century determined that the two grapes are unrelated. Today ampelographers believe that the grape is an offspring of the Swiss wine grape Rèze with DNA evidence suggesting some relationship with another white Piedmontese grape, Erbaluce.

Ampelographers believe that the name Cascarolo is derived from the Italian cascolare, meaning "to fall", which could be a reference to the susceptibility of the variety to the viticultural hazard of coulure which causes unfertilized grape flowers to develop into poorly formed berries that fall off the vine.

== History and relationship to other grapes ==
The Piedmont region where Cascarolo bianco is grown

Cascarolo bianco is a very old grape variety that has been growing in the Piedmont wine region of northwest Italy for several centuries. Wines made from the grape were once highly prized with the Cascarolo bianco wines from Turin being mentioned by Giovanni Battista Croce in 1606.

DNA profiling has shown that the grape is likely the offspring of the Swiss wine grape Rèze and an unknown second parent. That other parent maybe the Piedmontese grape Erbaluce which DNA analysis has shown to have some close relationship with Cascarolo bianco but the exact nature of that relationship is not yet known. In his 1887 handbook on ampelography, German ampelographer Hermann Goethe speculated that Cascarolo bianco was the same variety as the Hungarian wine grape Fehér Gohér (also known as Augster Weisser) but today DNA evidence has shown that the two grapes are unrelated.

== Wine regions ==
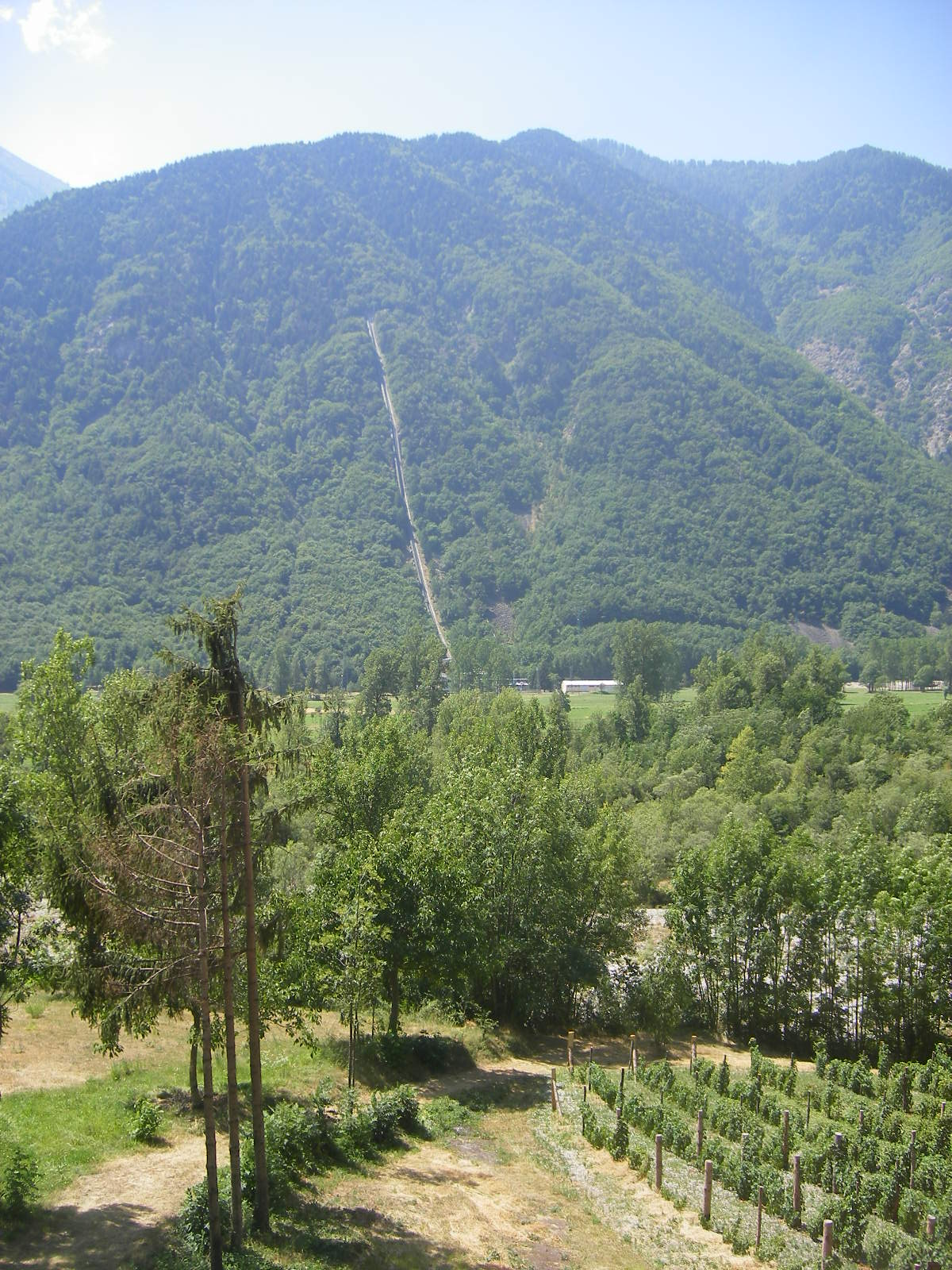
Today Cascarolo bianco is mostly planted in older vineyards nestled among the foothills of the Alps (vineyard in the western region of the Cuneo province pictured).

For many centuries Cascarolo bianco was widely planted throughout Piedmont, particularly around the communes of Chieri and Pinerolo in the province of Turin, Casale Monferrato in the province of Alessandria and Moncalvo in the province of Asti. However today the grape has very limited plantings and is found mostly in field blends from older vineyards found in the foothills of the Alps.

== Synonyms ==
Over the years, Cascarolo bianco has been known under a variety of synonyms including: Cascarala, Cascarecul, Cascarelbo and Cascarolo.
