= Grisa nera =

Variety of grape

Grisa nera is a red Italian wine grape variety that is grown in the Piedmont wine region of northwest Italy where it is used in both winemaking and as a table grape. The grape is most often used as a minor blending component with wines made from Barbera, Neretta Cuneese and Plassa.

== History ==
The Piedmont region where Grisa nera is found.

In the early 21st century, DNA profiling showed that Grisa nera had a parent-offspring relationship with another red Piedmontese wine grape, Avarengo, though it is not yet known which grape is the parent and which is the offspring. However, this strong relationship between two grapes that are grown almost exclusively in the Piedmont region strongly suggest that both varieties are native to Piedmont.

== Viticulture ==
Grisa nera is a mid to late ripening variety that is used for both wine and table grape production. The vine can be very vigorous, producing large foliage but often has low fertility and is generally low yielding. While Grisa nera has good resistance to most fungal diseases, such as downy and powdery mildew, it is susceptible to the viticultural hazard of coulure.

== Wine regions ==
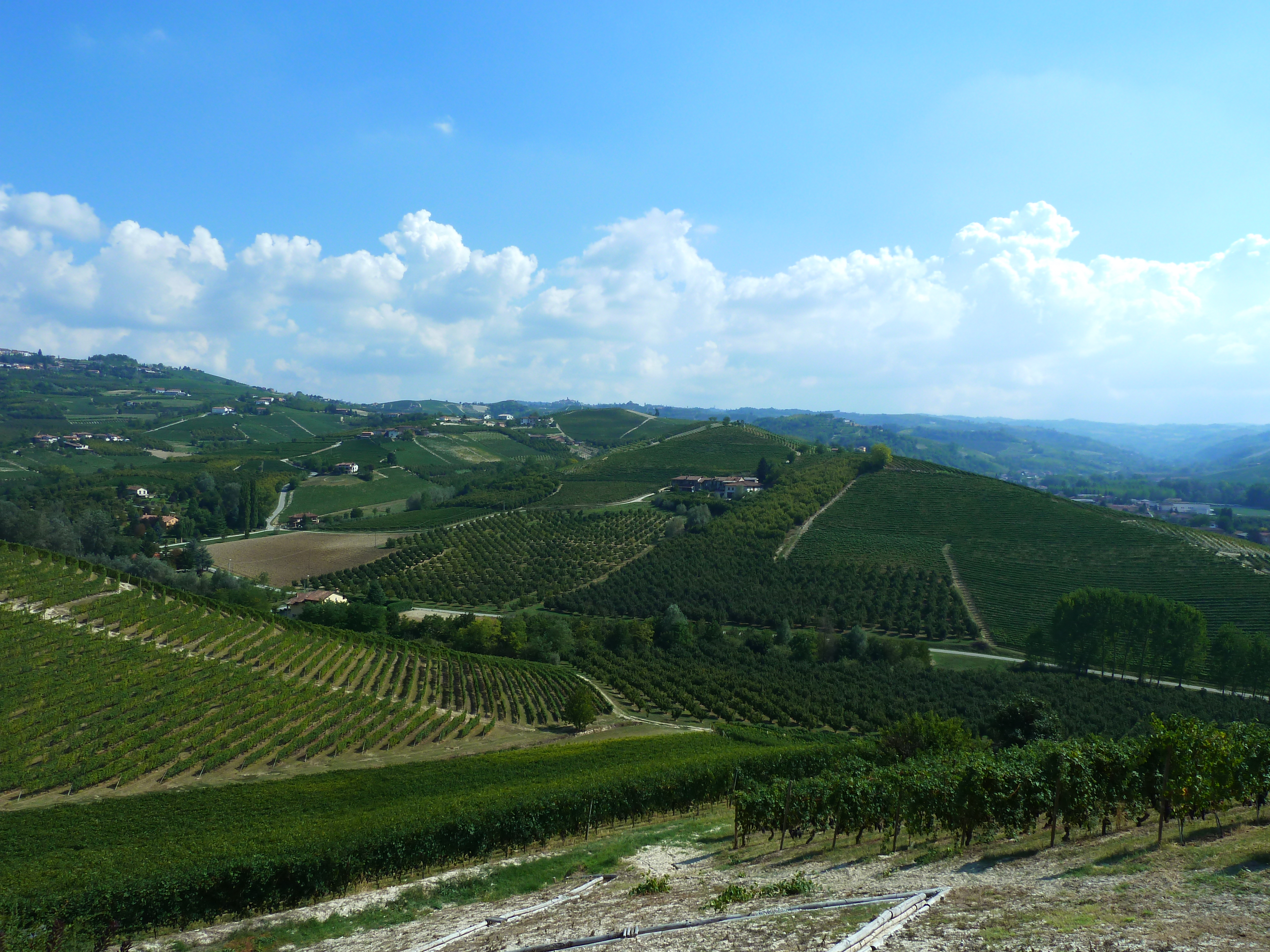
Some plantings of Grisa nera can be found in the province of Cuneo (pictured) inter-planted with other local Piedmontese grape varieties.

Grisa nera is almost exclusively found in the foothills of the Alps in the Piedmont wine region of Italy. Here it is grown around the town of Pinerolo in the province of Turin and along the lower reaches of the Susa Valley. A few plantings of Grisa nera can also be found in the province of Cuneo. Throughout Piedmont, the grape is most often found in the field blends in the vineyard and in the winery is often blended with other local Piedmontese wine grapes including Barbera, Neretta Cuneese and Barbera.

== Synonyms ==
Over the years, Grisa nera has been known under a variety of synonyms including: Bigia, Grigia, Grisa, Grisa di Cumiana (in Pinerolo) and Uva Bigia.
