= Plassa =

Variety of grape

Plassa (also known as Scarlattino) is a red Italian wine grape variety that is grown in the Piedmont wine region of northwest Italy where it was once historically used as a table grape but now is almost always used for winemaking. Here the grape is most often used as a minor blending component adding tannins to wines made from Barbera, Neretta Cuneese, Grisa nera and Chatus.

== History ==
Plassa is noted for the very thick skin of it grape berries which is a source tannins.

The name Plassa is derived from the word pellaccia which in the local Piedmontese dialect means "hard skin" and is a reference to the very thick grape skins of Plassa berries. Ampelographers believe that the grape is native to Piedmont region where it has been historically associated with the communes of Bibiana, Bricherasio, Campiglione-Fenile, Pinerolo and San Secondo di Pinerolo in the province of Turin.

The thick skin of Plassa allowed the grape to stay fresh after harvest, making it prized as a table grape, but over time it is used as a table grape wine and now its use is solely for wine production.

== Viticulture ==
Plassa is a mid to late ripening variety that can be very vigorous producing large foliage which may require canopy management to keep in check. The variety gets its name, Scarlattino, from the bright red color that the plant stems develop during the growing season. While Plassa has good resistance to most fungal diseases, such as downy and powdery mildew, due to its very thick skins it is susceptible to the viticultural hazard of millerandage and to infection from European grapevine moths.

== Wine regions ==
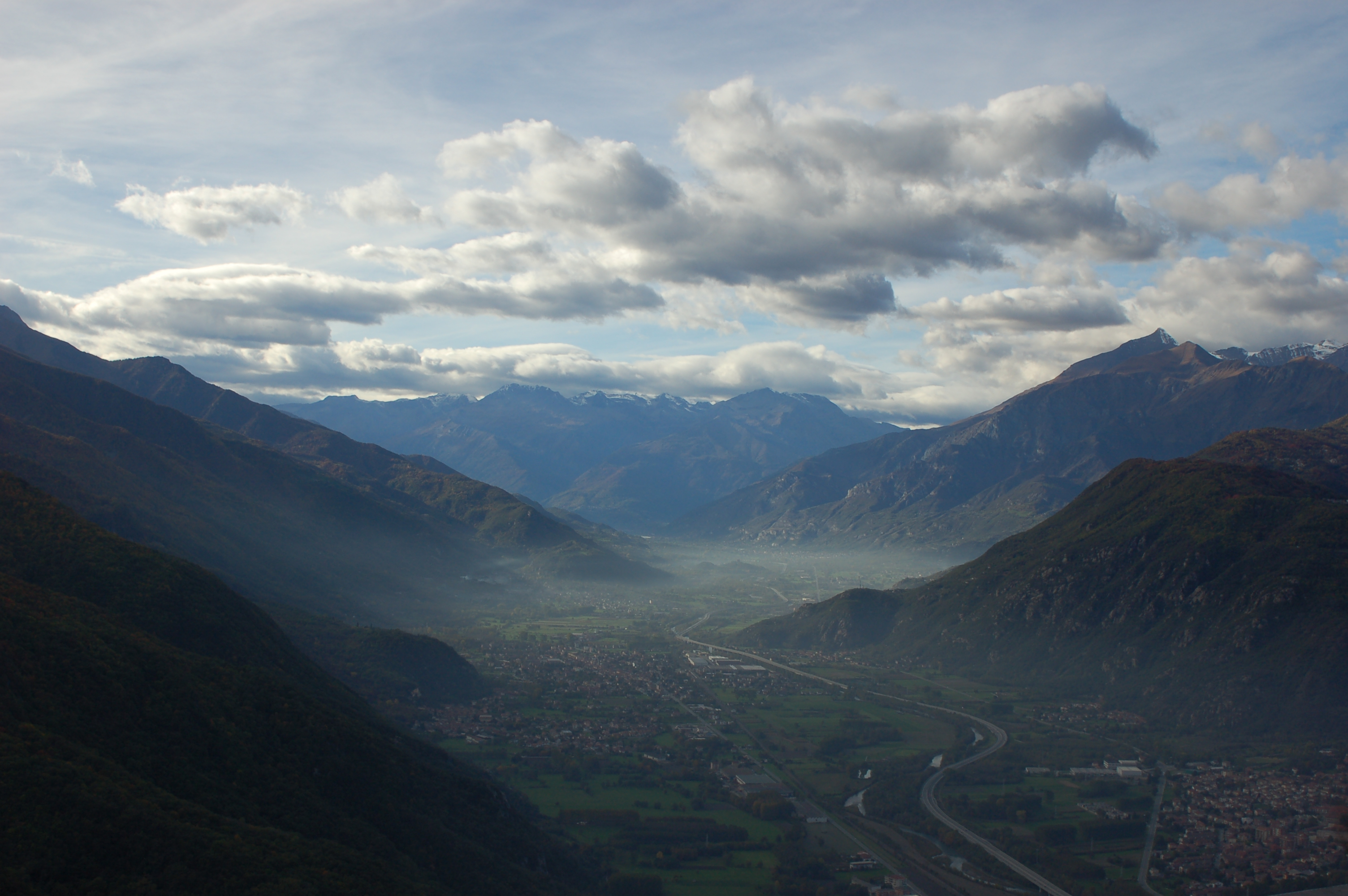
Plassa is grown along the Susa Valley (pictured) that runs through the province of Turin.

In 2000, there were 44 hectares (110 acres) of Plassa in Italy, almost exclusively found in the province of Turin in the Piedmont wine region where its grown along the Susa Valley and around the communes of Bibiana, Bricherassio, Campiglione-Fenile, Cumiana, Frossasco and Pinerolo. Here the grape is primarily used as a blending component, adding tannins to wines made from Barbera, Neretta Cuneese, Grisa nera, and Chatus.

== Synonyms ==
Over the years, Plassa has been known under a variety of synonyms including: Cheur dur, Cuor Duro, Palessa, Pelasina, Pelassa, Pellaccia, Pellacia, Scarlattin, Scarlattino, and Scarlattino Plassa.
