= Rossese bianco =

Variety of grape

Rossese bianco is a white Italian wine grape variety that is grown around the communes of Roddino and Sinio in the Langhe region of the province of Cuneo in Piedmont. While sharing the name Rossese with several Italian varieties (including Rossese di Dolceacqua, Grillo and Ruzzese), DNA profiling has shown that all these varieties have unique genetic profiles and appear to have no close relationship to each other.

Ampelographers believe that the name Rossese came from a description of the intense color of the Rossese berries with the many varieties that are known as Rossese having skin colors that range from deep red to pink to dark gold after veraison.

== History ==
All known plantings of Rossese bianco are found in the Cuneo province in Piedmont around the communes of Roddino and Sinio.

In 1596, Andrea Bacci of Sant'Elpidio a Mare, a winemaker who also served as a physician to Felice Peretti di Montalto before his elevation to Pope Sixtus V noted that a grape known as Rossese bianco or Roxeise had been producing wine of high quality and reputation since the 15th century. However, it is impossible to know if this grape is the Rossese bianco grape of Roddino and Sinio or one of the many other Italian wine grapes that have been known as Rossese.

== Styles and wines ==
According to Master of Wine Jancis Robinson, the rare varietal examples of Rossese bianco tend to be light bodied with fresh flavors. It is a currently a permitted variety in the Denominazione di origine controllata wines of Langhe.

== Synonyms ==
While many grape varieties share the name Rossese, as of 2013 there were no known synonyms for the Rossese bianco grown in Roddino and Sinio.
