= Terre del Barolo =

Italian cooperative winery

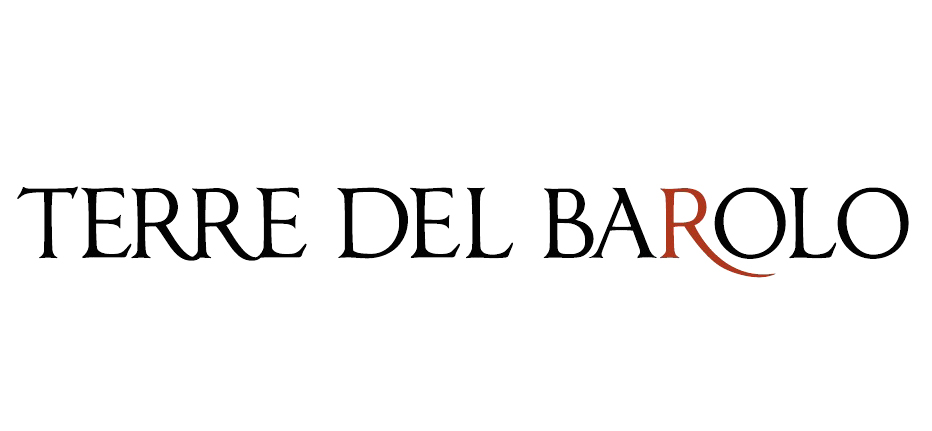

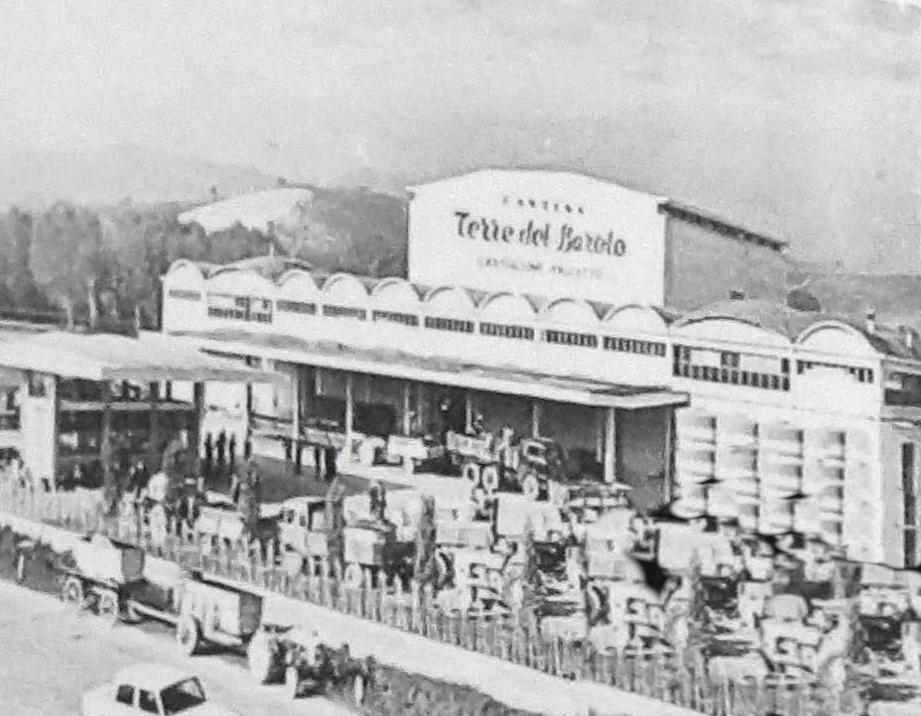
- Industry: Wine production
- Founded: 1958
- Founder: Arnaldo Rivera
- Headquarters: via Alba-Barolo, 8 12060 Castiglione Falletto (CN) - Italy
- Key people: Paolo Boffa (President)
- Products: wine

Terre del Barolo is a cooperative winery based in Castiglione Falletto, in the Langhe area of northern Italy, renowned for the production of the main Piedmontese wines. Founded in 1958, Cantina Terre del Barolo is one of the most historic cooperative wineries still active in Piedmont.

== History ==
=== Genesis of the project ===
The territory of Langhe has always been a land of renowned wines, however the first decades of the twentieth century were characterized by difficult periods: the two world wars, the phylloxera epidemic and periods of economic depression due also to a market of grapes characterized by more and more strong speculations to the detriment of winemakers.

The idea of founding a cooperative winery in Castiglione Falletto is due to the intuition of Arnaldo Rivera, son of winegrowers in the area. Already his father founded a cooperative winery in the twenties but didn’t have the hoped success, anyway Arnaldo Rivera had the mind to repeat the company. Before even developing the project to involve local winegrowers, as a primary school teacher of the country as it was, he proposed almost like a game to their students to set up a sort of cooperative of the hens with the purpose of financing the year-end school tour with the sale of the eggs. This didactic experiment, so-called “the hens' cooperative”, carried out as a capital for each student, was successful and at the end of the school year, its dissolution was unanimously approved with the consequent sale of all the hens. In 1958 Rivera succeeded in overcoming the widespread distrust of cooperative associations since in the first half of the twentieth-century various wine consortia had also failed due to a lack of dynamic market. While continuing his activities as an elementary teacher and mayor of Castiglione Falletto, the project of a new wine cooperative involved him in the development of local resources and helped to safeguard the interests of the wine sector in the area, avoiding further speculation. Rivera was able to convince many winegrowing friends in difficulty but also mayors of other municipalities and then public bodies and banks to obtain the necessary funding.

=== The foundation of Cantina Terre del Barolo ===
On December 8, 1958, with a deed of incorporation drafted in the hall of the Town Hall of Grinzane Cavour in front of the notary Italo Ferrero, Cantina Terre del Barolo was founded with headquarters in Castiglione Falletto and the founding members at the time of foundation, represented by President Arnaldo Rivera, were twenty-two. (Note: The founding members of the Terre del Barolo cooperative were: Battista Alessandria, Giuseppe Ardito, Pietro Bosco, Enrico Bosso, Luigi Brignone, Alfredo Castagno, Pietro Castagnotto, Giuseppe Destefanis, Enrico Fava, Giuseppe Molino, Angelo Moscone, Giovanni Negro, Francesco Porasso, Paolo Porello, Giovanni Rabino, Arnaldo Rivera, Francesco Rivera, Giuseppe Roddolo, Andrea Roggero, Luigi Roggero, Renzo Roggero, Giovanni Veglio.) The works for the construction of the plant, designed by the engineer Biagio Soave and the architect Elio Celato, left after in 1959 on land partly purchased by the diocese and partly by the peasants and, in the meantime, the members of the association rose to over three hundred. In January 1961 the first ordinary assembly met to approve the first balance sheet which amounted to Lire 187,915,461 with revenues of Lire 2,666,913.

=== Growth during the difficult seventies ===
In 1968 the budget of Cantina Terre del Barolo exceeded one billion lire and the plant was expanded to accommodate new oak barrels but also new spaces for the grapes provision, whose sale by the winegrowers partners no longer represented a problem as in the past. Despite the economic crisis of the early seventies, the cooperative winery began to be known by participating in various trade fairs in Alba but also in Turin, Milan, Genoa, Parma, Verona and was also organized a first distribution network. In 1970 the Terre del Barolo cooperative winery also received two Diplomas with a Gold Medal, following participation in the 2nd National Competition of Italian Wines held in Milan. In 1974 the Cantina Terre del Barolo reached almost five hundred members and, despite the less abundant vintages, production and sales were destined to rise.

=== The eighties ===
At the beginning of the eighties, the cooperative winery received in New York the prestigious American award “Italian Barrel Wine” for a 1979 Nebbiolo d'Alba decreed as one of the best Italian wines. The number of members settled at 550, with a budget that was close to seven billion lire. In 1983 the twenty-five year activity was celebrated and Arnaldo Rivera, in a speech during the ceremony said that «a social entity that acts democratically sharing the income in relation to the participation of members can be a winning idea, breaking down the prejudice that men are destined to be armed against each other in the name of individual privilege and egoism». In December 1986 Arnaldo Rivera resigned and after his death in 1987, took over Francesco Conterno who held the office of president until 1990, taking care to complete the process of renewal already started with Rivera, that included also the purchase of new equipments, the creation of an internal analysis laboratory and the modernization of the offices.

=== The cooperative from the nineties to today ===
Since 1990 Matteo Bosco became the new president of the cooperative and the members were reduced to about four hundred, although nevertheless achieving satisfying results about production and quality; important renovations and expansion of the cellar and refining rooms were also carried out. The flood of the Tanaro in 1994 damaged many municipalities and territories in the area, so the cooperative deliberated the granting of financial contributions in support of the most affected members. Since 2001, the cooperative has decided to set up an annual award to be awarded only to women distinguishing themselves for success in their professional field and the first woman to be awarded was Carla Fracci. In the following years, the Terre del Barolo Award was awarded to Luciana Littizzetto, Margherita Hack, Micol Fontana, Elena Sofia Ricci, Dacia Maraini and Enza Sampò. Under the leadership of the new president Paolo Boffa the Cantina Terre del Barolo in 2017, on the eve of its sixtieth anniversary, has commemorated its founder by creating a special selection of Barolo DOCG called ARNALDORIVERA.

== The wines ==
The cooperative winery mainly produces red wines produced exclusively from the Langhe grapes, respecting the DOC and DOCG regulations, including an organic line. The main wines are classified as Barolo, Nebbiolo, Barbera, and Dolcetto, to which is added a small production from the native Pelaverga and Nascetta wines. An Alta Langa DOCG "Metodo Classico" sparkling wine, a Barolo Chinato and a Barolo Grappa complete the range.

== Certifications ==
=== Quality ===
• BRC (GSF Global Standard Food) • ENI EN ISO 9001: 2008 • IFS (International Food Standard) • ISO 22000: 2005 • ISO 22005: 2008 • Biological

=== Environment ===
• ISO 14001: 04 • EMAS

== See also ==
- Arnaldo Rivera
- Barolo
- Langhe

== Bibliography ==
- Parusso, G. (2005). Alba il Novecento. Cuneo: Araba Fenice.
- Parusso, G. (2009). 50 anni insieme. Castiglione Falletto: Cantina Terre del Barolo.
