= Gamba di Pernice =

Red Italian wine grape variety

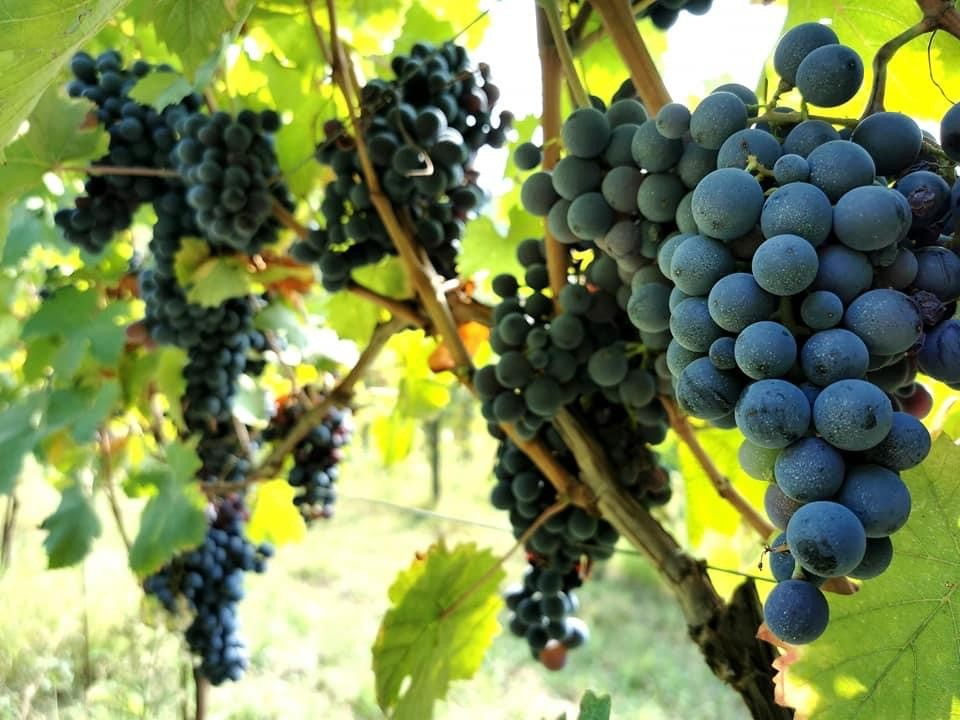
Gamba di pernice vines and grapes.

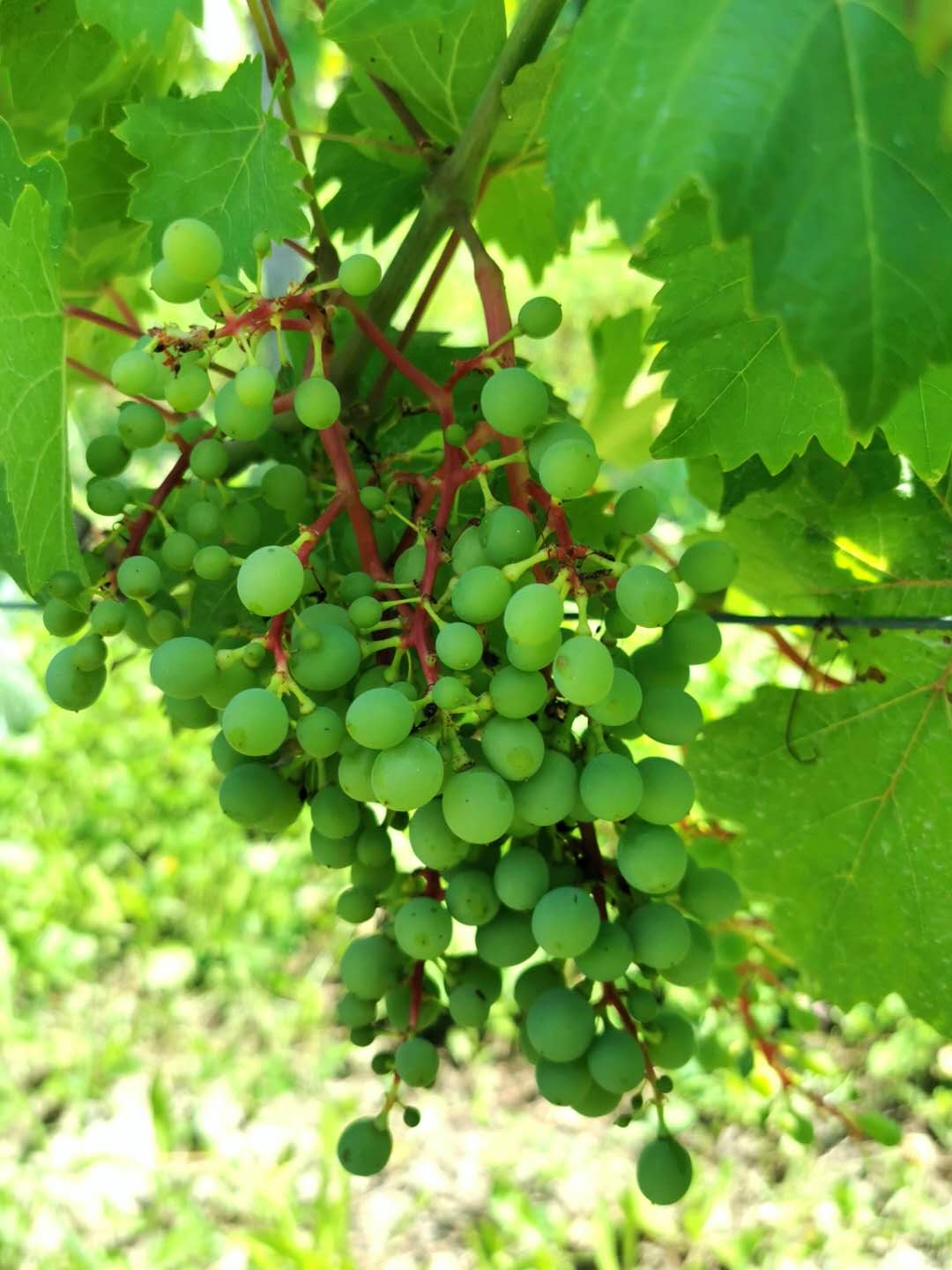
The unripe Gamba di Pernice bunch with the red colored stems

Gamba di Pernice, or the officially used name Gamba Rossa, is a red Italian wine grape variety from the Piedmont region. Translated from Italian, its name means "partridge leg" and is a reference to the red colored stalks of the vines. The grapes is mainly used for making DOC Calosso, a small volume red varietal wine which was granted Denominazione di Origine Controllata (DOC) status in 2011. The current DOC recognized area of production for the wine covers only about 10 hectares of vines in the municipalities of Calosso, Costigliole d'Asti and Castagnole Lanze in the Asti Province^{[1]}. Gamba di Pernice is therefore one of the lowest production varietal wines in Italy with its own DOC. Total production is around 30 000 bottles per year (2017) ^{[3]}. Although lightly colored, Gamba di Pernice wines have concentrated flavors with a spicy, herbal character and the ability to age well^{[2]}.

The Gamba di Pernice is one of varieties that survived the phylloxera at the end of the nineteenth century. It is reported to be related to the Neretto degli Alteni (or Verzuolo), a grape present in the Costigliole Saluzzo area^{[2]}. It was considered of secondary importance compared to the main commercial grapes in the area, but was rediscovered at the beginning of the 2000s by wine growers near Calosso.^{[5]}

== Viticulture ==
The Gamba di Pernice vines have medium size, pentagonal, hepta-lobate leaves with the red colored stalks. The blue-black, purple hued pruinose grapes sit in medium-sized, pyramid-shaped clusters with one or two well-developed wings. The bunch is compact with medium-large or large spheroidal berries. The productivity is rather high and constant with the harvest typically taking place in late September or early October^{[1]}

== Wine making ==
The practices in the cellar for Gamba di Pernice do not differ from the classic red wine making methods for other grapes with good phenolic richness. As it is an aromatic grape variety then fermentations are carried out for typically 10 days followed by maceration for 7–8 days including “cap punching” or “cap pumping over” processes in order to extract the phenolic compounds from skins and seeds. The wine making is generally kept in stainless steel tanks, but some producers use maturation in large wooden barrels or re-used barriques for typically 9–12 months.^{[3]}

== Wines ==
Young Gamba di Pernice wines have a bright medium ruby color and red berry aromas and medium bodied. The nose is often described as intense and elegant, initially floral (violet) and fruity and over time developing amber red hues and more spicy, peppery, tarry and balsamic aromas and flavors. The wines are medium bodied, balanced and refined and typically have good ageing potentials^{[5]}

Gamba di Pernice wines match most foods, from lighter white meat preparations to slow cooked, concentrated beef stews^{[5]}

== History ==
The first written mention of Gamba di Pernice is by Count Nuvolone in 1708. In the work Ampelography of the province of Alessandria (De Maria and Leardi in 1875) we find the first complete description of the vine and Dalmasso in 1909 describes it with the synonyms of "Gamba rossa" and "Pernicine". As per folklore the current cultivations of Gamba di Pernice can be traced back to a few 'stolen' buds by people from Moiso that brought them to the Cora di Canelli nursery, not far from Calosso in the beginning of the nineteenth century.^{[2]}

Gamba di Pernice was at risk of extinction at the end of the 20th century. Professor Albino Morando from the Oenological School of Alba and Professor Mannini of the University of Turin carried out the first scientific experiments with the Gamba di Pernice in 1990. Gamba di Pernice was found to be still growing around Calosso by local pioneering wine producers like Piero Bussi and Valter Bosticardo and grapes and wines were subjected to chemical and sensorial analysis at the then Experimental Institute for Oenology in Asti. In the early 2000s four vintages were evaluated for the agronomic and productive behavior of the vine by researchers both in the Calosso vineyard and in the field of grapevine germplasm of the C.N.R. in Grinzane Cavour. Further Anna Schneider and Stefano Raimondi collected historical information and identified the genetic profile of the grape variety by analyzing its micro-satellite markers. Finally in 2007 Gamba di Pernice was entered in the Italian National Register of Vine Varieties as “Gamba Rossa” and allowed its legal commercial cultivation. In 2011 it was awarded its own Denominazione di Origine Controllata as “Calosso DOC”. The ancient grape had been saved from extinction and brought back to commercial cultivation by a small group of scientists and wine growers. ^{[3]}.

== Calosso DOC ==
The production area of the Calosso DOC wine is located in the Province of Asti and includes the municipalities of Calosso, Castagnole delle Lanze and Costigliole D’Asti. Vineyard elevation has to be between 150 m (490 ft) and 450 m (1,475 ft) above sea level. The DOC has 4 categories officially using the “Gamba Rossa” name instead of “Gamba di Pernice” as explained in the table: ^{[4]}:

Calosso DOC	Calosso Riserva DOC	Calosso Riserva Vigna DOC	Calosso Passarà DOC
Dry red wine >90% Gamba Rossa grapes <10 % Red grapes suitable for cultivation in the Piedmont region. > 11.50% vol Alcohol Wine aged for at least 20 months Red wine with a ruby red color with orange reflections with aging smell, delicate, fragrant and harmonious, characteristic flavor.	Dry red wine >90% Gamba Rossa grapes <10 % Red grapes suitable for cultivation in the Piedmont region. >12.00% vol Alcohol Wine aged for at least 30 months Aged red wine with a ruby red color with orange reflections as it ages, a delicate, characteristic odor and a dry, harmonious and characteristic flavor	Dry red wine >90% Gamba Rossa grapes <10 % Red grapes suitable for cultivation in the Piedmont region. >12.00% vol Alcohol Wine aged for at least 30 months Aged red wine with a ruby red color with orange reflections with aging, delicate, characteristic odor and dry, harmonious, characteristic flavor. Certain winemaking practices are respected	Dry red wine >90% Gamba Rossa grapes <10 % Red grapes suitable for cultivation in the Piedmont region >14.00% vol Alcohol The grapes destined for the production of the Calosso Passarà DOC wine must undergo natural drying until they reach a sugar content of at least 13.5° Brix. Red wine with a ruby red color with orange reflections with aging, characteristic smell, intense and characteristic flavor, harmonious, warm.
