= Erbaluce =

Variety of grape

- Grape (Vitis)
- Color of berry skin: Blanc
- Species: Vitis vinifera
- Also called: See list of synonyms
- Origin: Italy
- Notable regions: Piedmont
- VIVC number: 3925

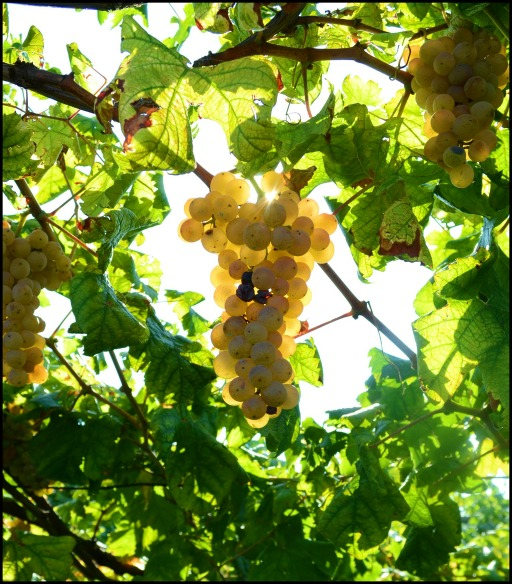
Erbaluce grapes ready for harvest

Erbaluce or Erbaluce bianca is a white Italian wine grape grown primarily in the Piedmont region around Caluso, in Canavese. In addition to dry table wines, it is used to make sweet wines with deep golden coloring, such as passito. The grape has a long history in the Piedmont region, with the first written record dating to 1606, and most likely originated in the alpine hills of northern Piedmont.

In the 21st century, DNA profiling determined that Erbaluce has a close genetic relationship with another Piedmontese wine grape, Cascarolo bianco, though the exact nature of that relationship is not yet known.

== Wines ==
Wines made from Erbaluce tend to be dry with noticeable acidity. While the grape's acidity makes it ideally suitable for sweet wine production, the dry wines need to have considerable amount of fruit in order to balance that acidity. Both the dry and sweet styles of Erbaluce tend to exhibit characteristic apple aromas and flavors. Since the 1990s, Piedmontese producers have been working on improving the quality of Erbaluce wines to compete with the whites of Cortese and Arneis.

Erbaluce di Caluso is a DOCG wine.

== Synonyms ==
Erbaluce is also known under the following synonyms: Alba Lucenti, Albaluce, Albe Lucenti, Ambra, Bianc Rousti, Bianchera, Bianco Rusti, Erba Luce, Erbaluce bianca, Erbalucente, Erbalucente bianca, Erbalus, Erbcalon, Greco Novarese, Repcalon, Trebbiano Gentile, Trebbiano Perugino, Trebbiano Verde dell'Umbria, Uva Rustia, Uva Rustica, and Vernazza di Gattinara.
