= Arnaldo Rivera =

Italian politician (1919–1987)

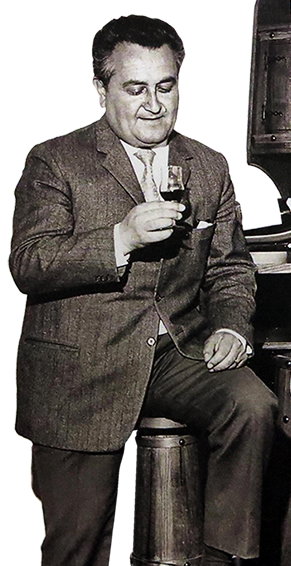
- Rivera in the 1960s
- Born: 13 December 1919; Castiglione Falletto, Piedmont, Italy
- Died: 10 January 1987 (aged 67); Castiglione Falletto, Piedmont, Italy
- Occupations: teacher, entrepreneur
- Known for: Founder of the Cantina Terre del Barolo

Arnaldo Rivera (1919–1987) was an Italian teacher, entrepreneur and partisan. For almost forty years he was the mayor and the primary school teacher of Castiglione Falletto, so 1958 he founded the Cantina Terre del Barolo, one of the oldest and largest cooperative wineries in Piedmont still active.

== Biography ==
=== The childhood, the war and the Resistance ===
Arnaldo Rivera was born in a family of winegrowers who produced Nebbiolo grapes in Rivera place, close to Castiglione Falletto. After the primary schools in Monforte d'Alba, he graduated at the Magistral Institute of Alba in 1939 and the following year he left to the military school of Bassano del Grappa, where he was enrolled in the Alpini with the rank of lieutenant and after Italy's entry into World War II he fought on the French front and later in Greece and Russia. He returned to Piedmont in 1943 and following the armistice of Cassibile he deserted the army and, with the name of "Arno", escaped to the mountains to join the 14th Garibaldi Brigade partisan in the Langhe, with which he participated in actions against the fascists of the X Mas who tried to reconquest Alba. The long and tortuous path of liberation led him to Turin, where he lived during the exciting days that preceded the Partisan uprising on 25 April 1945 which liberated the city, and few months later he received the proposal to take part in the National Association of Italian Partisans as a Provincial Secretary, but he preferred to return to his town, as desired by his own family.

=== Return to Castiglione Falletto and the teaching ===
In the autumn of 1949 Arnaldo Rivera began his activity as a primary school teacher in Castiglione Falletto. In 1951 he founded a civic list and was elected mayor, following also his political commitment as a former partisan and member of the ANPI. He was an appreciated local administrator because he dedicated himself to the development of the territory, still so strongly marked by the devastation of the war; one of its major achievements was the construction of the Langhe aqueduct, which also benefited the town of Castiglione Falletto. 1956 was the year of his marriage with Esther Rinaldi, who was also a teacher, but no children were born from their marriage.

=== Foundation of Cantina Terre del Barolo ===
In 1958 Arnaldo Rivera wanted to repeat the experience of his father, former founder of a small cooperative winery of local winegrowers, and founded the Cantina Terre del Barolo; while continuing his activities as a primary school teacher and mayor, this project assiduously assured him personally in the development of local resources. Rivera he succeeded in overcoming the widespread distrust of this form of cooperative associations since in the first half of the twentieth century some winegrower consortia had also failed due to a lack of dynamic market. Rivera's constant commitment thus contributed to convincing local winegrowers to participate in the company, safeguarding the interests of the wine sector in the area, threatened by a grapes market characterized by increasingly and strong speculations to the detriment of winemakers. On 2 June 1975 Arnaldo Rivera received the nomination of Commendatore della Repubblica conferred to him by the President of the Republic Giovanni Leone for merits in the field of the economy and in the commitment of public offices. Two years later he left teaching on reaching the age limits but he continued to hold the office of mayor and devoted himself more to the development of Cantina Terre del Barolo, achieving important results and positions of responsibility in various local organizations such as Asprovit and the Consortium of Barolo and Barbaresco, of which he became president in 1978. In 1980 in Verona, during the international edition of Vinitaly, Arnaldo Rivera received the "Gran Medaglia Cangrande" on the recommendation of the Councilor for Agriculture of the Piedmont Bruno Ferraris, a recognition that is awarded annually by the historic Veronese oenological event on the designation of regional administrations. In one of his speeches during the event organized in 1983 to celebrate the twenty-fifth anniversary of Cantina Terre del Barolo, Arnaldo Rivera said that: «a social entity that acts democratically sharing income in relation to the participation of members can be a winning idea, breaking down the prejudice that men are destined to be armed against each other in the name of individual privilege and egoism».

=== Death and commemoration ===
After thirty seven years at the head of the town of Castiglione Falletto and thirty in the presidency of the cooperative winery Terre del Barolo, Arnaldo Rivera died in the late evening of 10 January 1987 for a heart attack that hit him on the return from one of the many sessions of the board of Cantina Terre del Barolo. In 1990 the town of Castiglione Falletto inaugurated the new civic library "A. Rivera", dedicated to him, providing it with a catalog of over three thousand volumes, including a specific section dedicated to enology. In 2017, the Cantina Terre del Barolo has also commemorated its founder with a special selection of Barolo DOCG called ARNALDORIVERA.

=== Honors ===
Commendatore della Repubblica (Order of Merit of the Italian Republic)

«For merit towards the nation in the field of the economy and in the commitment of public offices and activities carried out for social purposes.», 2 June 1975

== See also ==
- Terre del Barolo
- Langhe

== Bibliography ==
- Adduci, N. (2014). Gli altri. Fascismo repubblicano e comunità del Torinese (1943–1945). Milano: Franco Angeli.
- Martini, E. (2016). Partigiani penne nere. Torino: Edizioni del Capricorno. ISBN 978-88-7707-288-7.
- Masera, D. (1971). Langa partigiana '43–'45. Parma: Guanda.
- Parusso, G. (2005). Alba il Novecento. Cuneo: Araba Fenice.
- Parusso, G. (2009). 50 anni insieme. Castiglione Falletto: Cantina Terre del Barolo.
