= Avarengo =

Variety of grape

Avarengo is a red Italian wine grape variety that is grown in the Piedmont wine region of northwest Italy where it is a permitted blending component in the Denominazione di origine controllata (DOC) wines of Pinerolese. Here the grape is usually blended with Avanà, Neretta Cuneese and other local red Piemontese varieties.

== History ==
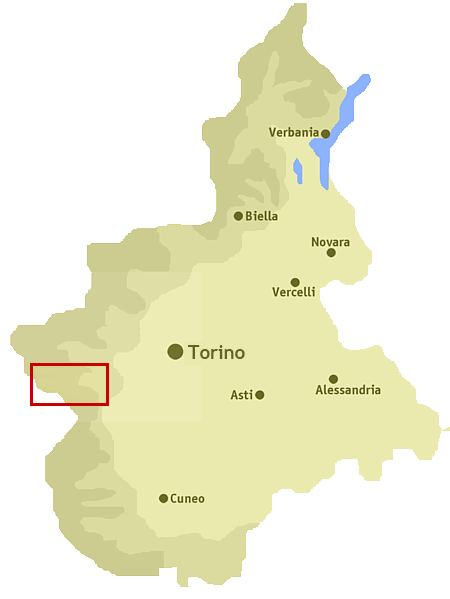
The Val Chisone region where Avarengo has a long history of production

Ampelographers believe that the name Avarengo is derived from the Latin avaro, which means "stingy" and is likely a reference to the vine's propensity to produce very low yields, even among young vines. The grape has had a long history growing in the Val Chisone region of the Cottian Alps and around the commune of Pomaretto in the Valle Germanasca with ampelographers believing that Avarengo likely originated somewhere between these areas.

Evidence for a Piemontese origin of Avarengo was further bolstered in the early 21st century when DNA analysis revealed a parent-offspring relationship with the old Piedmont wine and table grape, Grisa nera. Additional DNA research in 2011 suggest that Avarengo may also be closely related to the northern Piedmont grape variety Ner d'Ala.

== Viticulture ==
Avarengo is a mid-ripening grapevine that is noted for producing very low harvest yields.

== Wine regions ==
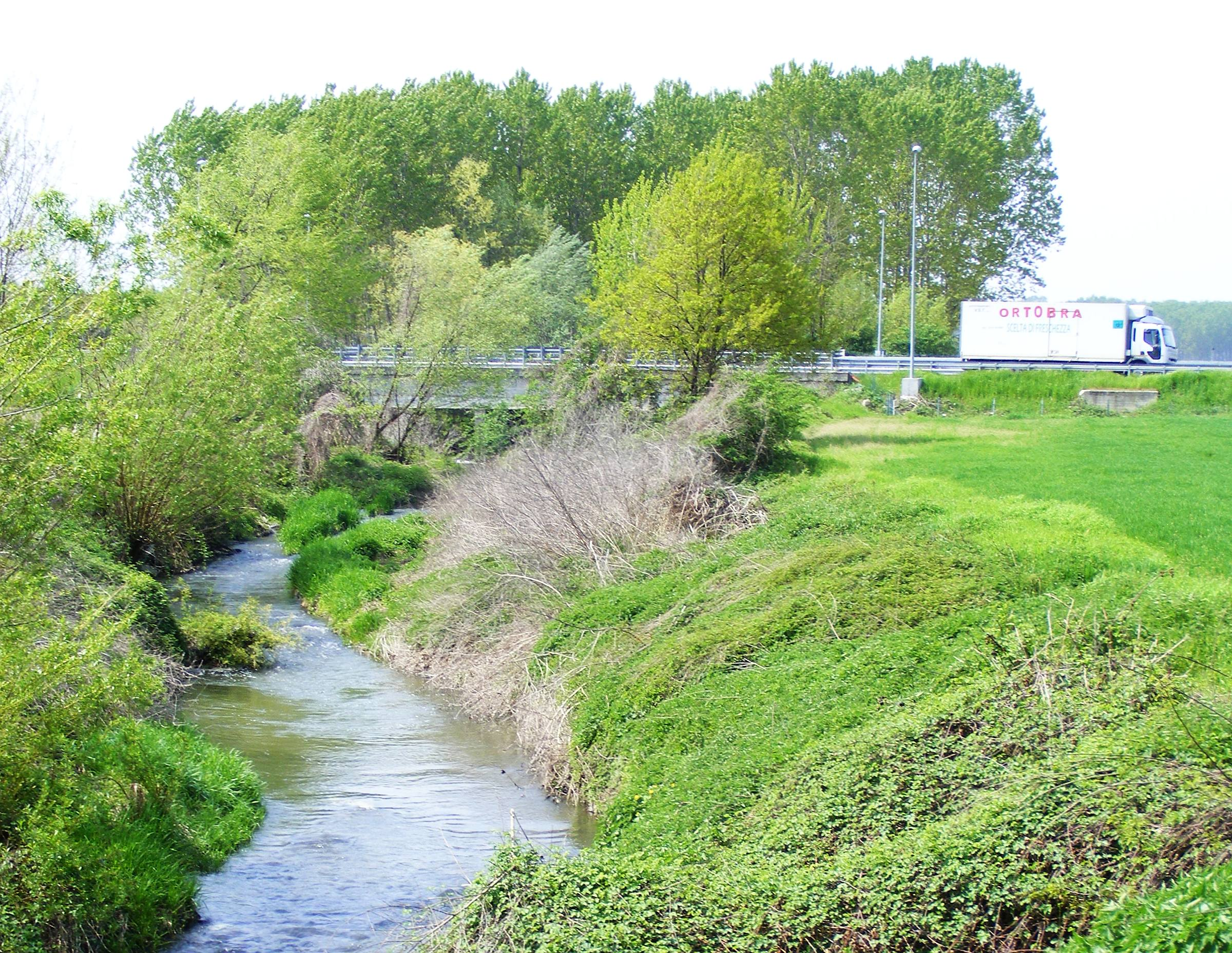
Today, Avarengo is still grown in the Pinerolese region (pictured) of Piedmont.

Over the past century, plantings of Avarengo have steadily decreased as the grape's reputation of being a low yielding variety has encouraged growers to move on to other varieties. In 2000, there were 1,680 hectares (4,200 acres) of the vine in production, most of it in the Pinerolese region between the commune of Pomaretto and the villages along the Chisone river valley in the province of Turin.

In the red wine only DOC of Pinerolese located in the provinces of Cuneo and Turin, Avarengo grapes destined for DOC wine production must be limited to a harvest yield of 10 tonnes/hectare with the finished wines needing to attain minimum alcohol level of at least 10.5%. Wines labeled as just Pinerolese must contain a minimum of 50% of Barbera, Bonarda Piemontese, Nebbiolo and Neretta Cuneese with Avarengo and other local red Piemontese varieties permitted to fill in the remainder of the blend. For Pinerolese Ramie, Avarengo must make up a minimum of 15% of the blend with Avanà and Neretta Cuneese required to make up an additional minimum of 30% and 20% of the blend, respectively, with other red wine grapes permitted to account up to a maximum of 35%.

== Styles ==
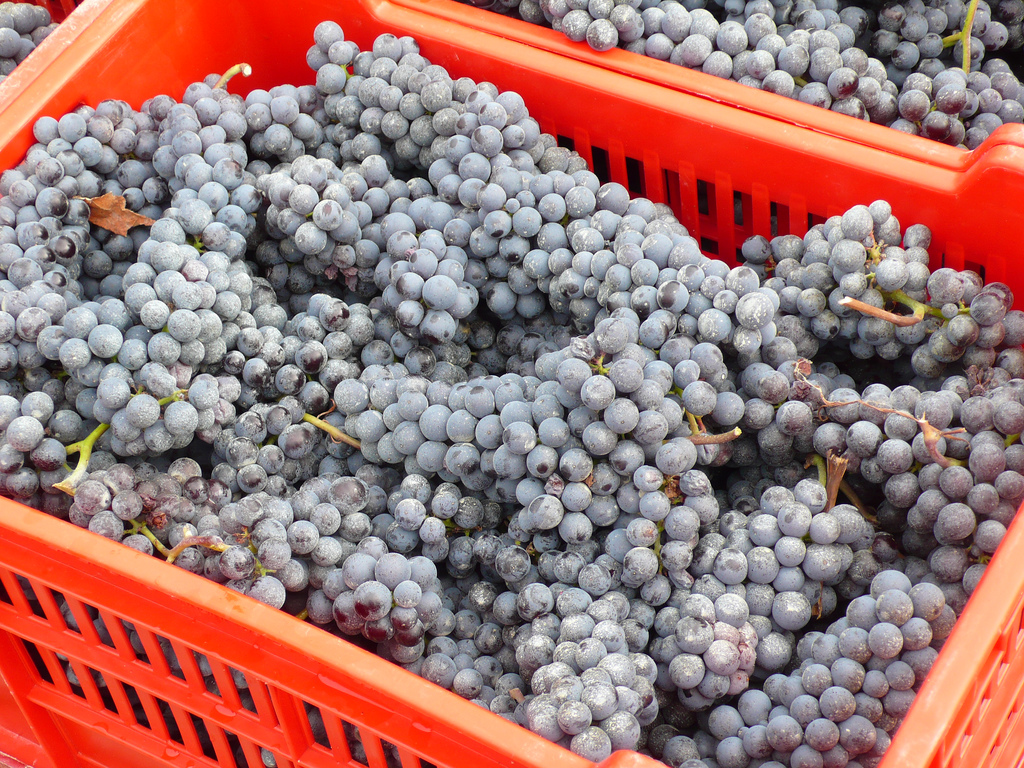
Within the Pinerolese DOC, Avarengo can be blended with Nebbiolo (pictured).

According to Master of Wine Jancis Robinson, as a varietal, Avarengo tends to produce pale-colored, light red wines that are highly aromatic with easy drinking, fresh fruit flavors.

== Synonyms ==
Over the years, Avarengo has been known under a variety of synonyms including: Amarene, Avarena, Avarenc, Avarene, Avarengo Comune, Avarengo Comune nero, Avarengo di Piemonte, Avarengo Fino, Avarengo Grosso, Avarengo Mezzano, Avarengo Piccolo, Avarengo Rama-Bessa, Avarengo Ramabessa, Avarengo Ramafessa, Boffera, Croassera, Mostera Ivrea, Mostera nera, Mosterce, Mostero, Mostero rosso, Mosto, Mostona, Mostosa, Mostoson, Mustèr (in the Canavese region), Muster, Riondasca, Riondosca, Riundasca (in the province of Biella) and Rondasca.
