= Castiglione Falletto =

- Comune
- Comune di Castiglione Falletto
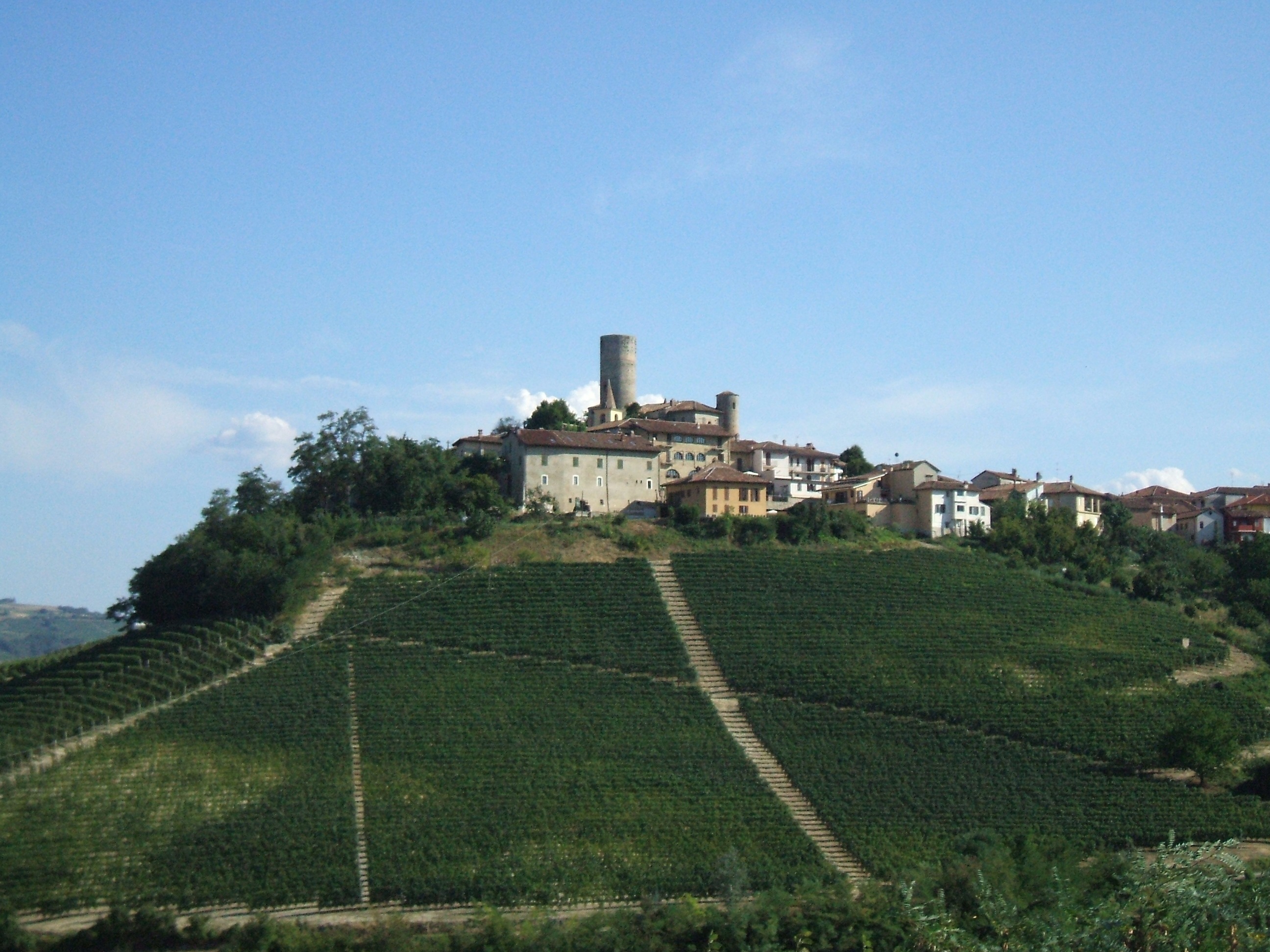

- Coat of arms

- Location within Italy Location within Piedmont
- Coordinates: 44°37′N 07°58′E
- Country: Italy
- Region: Piedmont
- Province: Cuneo (CN)
- Frazioni: Uccellaccio

Government
  - Mayor: Paolo Borgogno

Area
  - Total: 4.72 km^{2} (1.82 sq mi)
- Elevation: 350 m (1,150 ft)

Population (2016)
  - Total: 705
  - Density: 149/km^{2} (387/sq mi)
- Time zone: UTC+1 (CET)
  - Summer (DST): UTC+2 (CEST)
- Postal code: 12060
- Dialing code: 0173
- Website: http://www.comune.castiglionefalletto.cn.it/

Castiglione Falletto (Italian pronunciation: [kastiʎˈʎoːne falˈletto]) is a comune (municipality) in the Province of Cuneo in the Italian region Piedmont, located about 50 kilometres (31 mi) southeast of Turin and about 40 kilometres (25 mi) northeast of Cuneo.

Castiglione Falletto borders the following municipalities: Alba, Barolo, La Morra, Monforte d'Alba, and Serralunga d'Alba.

== See also ==
- Arnaldo Rivera
- Terre del Barolo

== Twin towns ==
- Muntelier, Switzerland
