= Étraire de la Dui =

Variety of grape

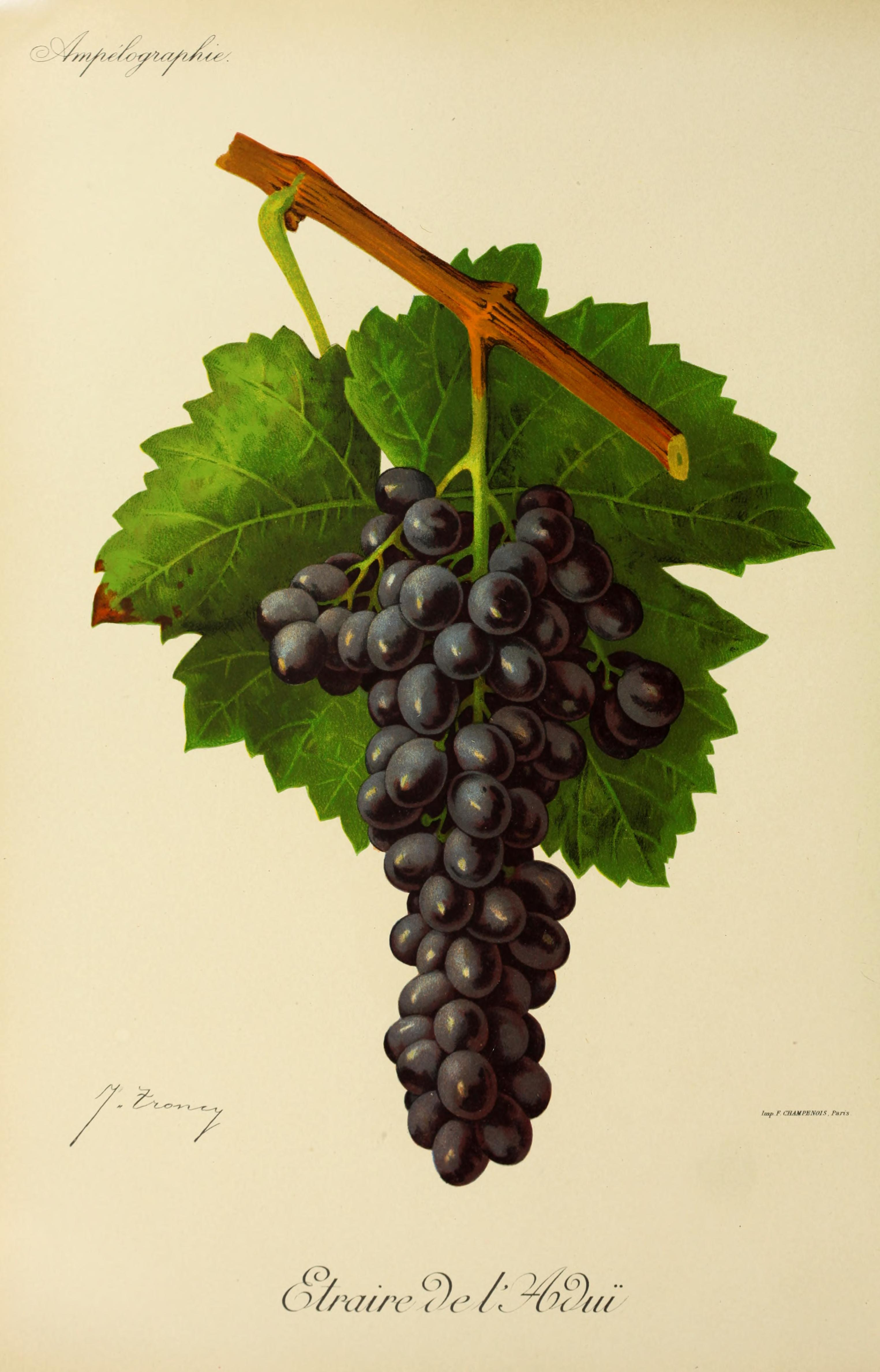

Étraire de la Dui (also known simply as Étraire) is a red French wine grape variety that was historically grown in the Rhone and Savoy wine regions. Its numbers were hit hard following the phylloxera epidemic and now only a few plantings remain in Savoy and the southeast fringes of the Rhone valley. According to wine expert Jancis Robinson, the grape produces a wine similar in style to Persan and can produce wine with aging potential.

== Synonyms ==
Various synonyms have been used to describe Étraire de la Dui and its wines including Beccu de l’Aduï, Betu, Étraire, Étraire de l’Adny, Étraire de l’Aduï, Étraire de la Dot, Étraire de la Dû, Étraire de la Duy, Gros persan and Grosse Étraire.
