= Piedmont wine =

Wines made in the Piedmont region of Italy

Piedmont
- Wine region
- Type: Italian wine
- Year established: 1966
- Years of wine industry: 1966-present
- Country: Italy
- Soil conditions: Calcareous marl, clay, sandstone, sand
- Grapes produced: 60% red varieties, 40% white varieties
- Varietals produced: Red: Nebbiolo, Barbera, Dolcetto, Grignolino, Freisa, Ruché; White: Arneis, Moscato Bianco, Cortese, Erbaluce, Chardonnay, Favorita
- Official designations: 5 DOCGs: Barolo, Barbaresco, Gavi, Asti Spumante, Moscato d'Asti; 45+ DOCs including Roero, Langhe, Monferrato; Several IGTs including Piemonte IGT

Location of Piedmont wine region in Italy

Piedmont wine is the range of Italian wines made in the region of Piedmont, in the northwestern corner of Italy. The best-known wines from the region include Barolo and Barbaresco. They are made from the Nebbiolo grape. These wines are ideal for storage and a well-aged Barolo for instance may leave a feeling of drinking velvet because the tannins are polished and integrated more and more into the wine. As the wine matures the colour becomes more brownish and rust-red.

Other popular grapes used for red wine production are Barbera and Dolcetto. Wine made with the Barbera grape is often fruity, with high acidity. It can be delicate with less tannin than wine made from the Nebbiolo grape. Dolcetto on the other side, is not, as the name indicates, sweet. Dolcetto means "little sweet one" (dolce is the Italian word for "sweet"). The grape gives fresh and dry red wines with some tannin. The wines made with the Dolcetto grape are typically consumed relatively young.

The sparkling wine Asti spumante is made from the Moscato grape. The majority of the area's winemaking take places in the provinces of Cuneo, Asti and Alessandria. The Brachetto is another variety used for making sweet and sparkling red wines.

While Turin is the capital of the Piedmont, Alba and Asti are at the heart of the region's wine industry. The winemaking industry of the Piedmont played a significant role in the early stages of the Risorgimento with some of the era's most prominent figures – such as Camillo Benso, conte di Cavour and Giuseppe Garibaldi – owning vineyards in Piedmont region and making significant contributions to the development of Piedmontese wines. The excessively high tariffs imposed by the Austrian Empire on the export of Piedmontese wines to Austrian controlled areas of northern Italy was one of the underlying sparks to the revolutions of 1848–1849.

== History ==
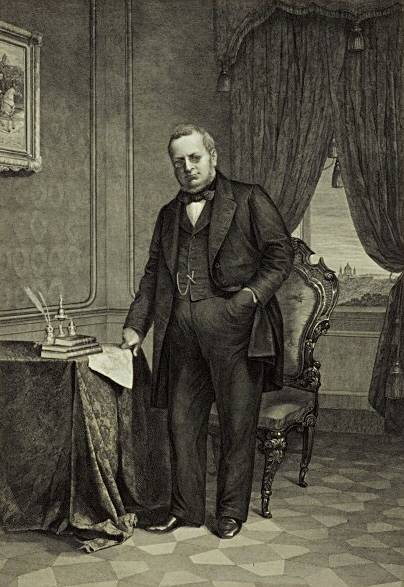
Camillo Benso, Count of Cavour was not only the first prime minister of the Kingdom of Piedmont-Sardinia during the Risorgimento, but also a prominent vineyard owner who introduced many French viticultural techniques to the region.

As in most of Italy, native vines are abundant in the land that the Ancient Greeks called Oenotrua (meaning "land of vines") and was subsequently cultivated by the Romans. With its close proximity, France has been a significant viticultural influence on the region, particularly Burgundy, which is evident today in the varietal styles of most Piedmontese wines with very little blending. One of the earliest mention of Piedmontese wines occurred in the 14th century when the Italian agricultural writer Pietro de Crescentius wrote his Liber Ruralium Commodorum. He noted the efforts of the Piedmontese to make "Greek style" sweet wines by twisting the stems of the grapes clusters and letting them hang longer on the vine to dry out. He also noted the changes with trellising in the region with more vines being staked close to the grounds rather than cultivated high among trees in the manner more common to Italian viticulture at the time. In the 17th century, the court jeweller of Charles Emmanuel I, Duke of Savoy earned broad renown for his pale red Chiaretto made entirely from the Nebbiolo grape.

During the Risorgimento (Italian unification) of the 19th century, many Piemontese winemakers and land owners played a pivotal role. The famous Italian patriot Giuseppe Garibaldi was a winemaker who in the 1850s introduced the use of the Bordeaux mixture to control the spread of oidium that was starting to ravage the area's vineyards. Camillo Benso, conte di Cavour was a wealthy vineyard owner who went abroad to study advance viticulture prior to founding the political newspaper Il Risorgimento. He was highly influential in the adoption of many French viticultural techniques among the Piemontese vineyards.

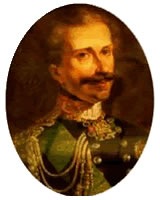
King Charles Albert of Sardinia

One of the early sparks of the Italian revolts against Austria was the act of the Austrian government to double the tariffs of Piemontese wines into the Austrian control lands of Lombardy, Emilia and the Veneto. This had a crippling effect on the Piemontese wine industry, essentially cutting them off from their main export market. In 1846, King Charles Albert of Sardinia spoke to the Piedmontese winegrowers at the meeting of the Agricultural Congress at Casale Monferrato where he assailed the Austrian oppression. By 1848, Piedmont was at war with Austria in one of the early events that eventually led to the unification of the Italian peninsula under the rule of Charles Albert's son Victor Emmanuel.

== Climate and geography ==
The Piedmont region is located in the foothills of the Alps forming its border with France and Switzerland. To the northwest is the Valle d'Aosta, to the east is the province of Lombardy with the Liguria region forming its southern border along the Apennines. In addition to the vast mountainous terrain, the Po Valley consumes a large area of available land-leaving only 30% of the region suitable for vineyard plantings. The valley and the mountains do contribute to the area's noted fog cover which aides in the ripening of the Nebbiolo ("Nebieu") grape (which gets its name from the Piedmontese word nebia meaning "fog").

Although the winemaking regions of the Piedmont and Bordeaux are very close in latitude, only the summertime temperatures are similar: the Piedmont wine region has a colder, continental winter climate, and significantly lower rainfall due to the rain shadow effect of the Alps. Vineyards are typically planted on hillsides altitudes between 490–1150 ft (150-400 metre). The warmer south facing slopes are mainly used for Nebbiolo or Barbera while the cooler sites are planted with Dolcetto or Moscato.

== Regions ==
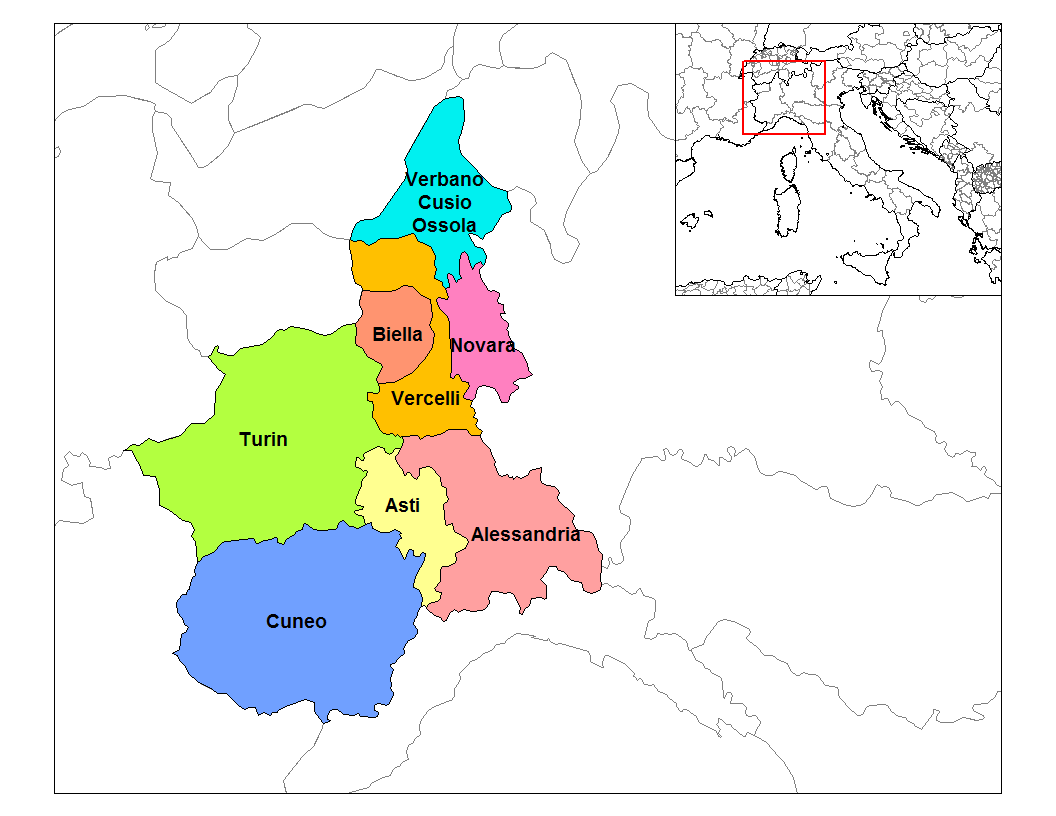
Provinces of Piedmont

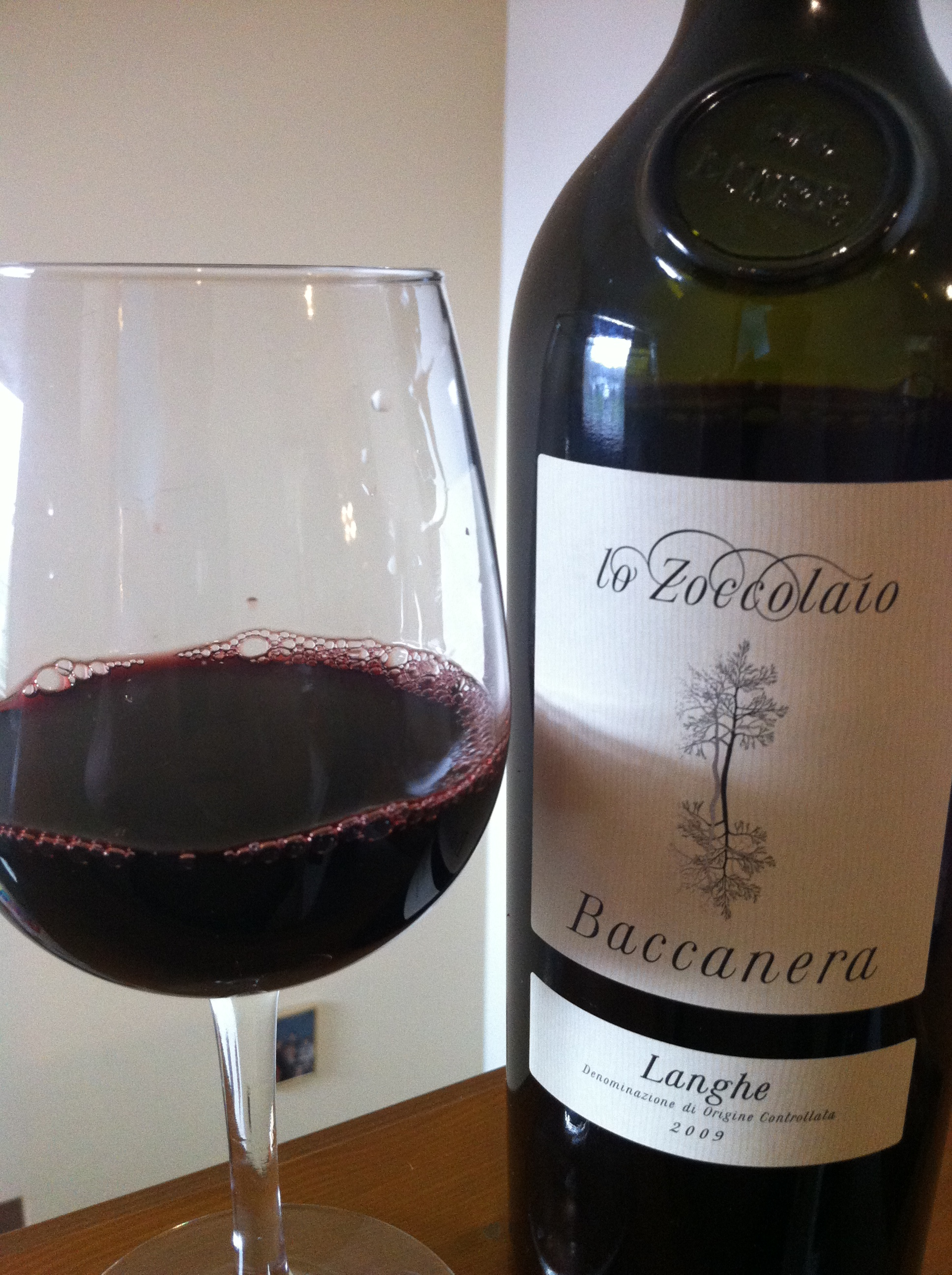
A Cabernet Sauvignon/Barbera blend from the Langhe DOC

The majority of the region's winemaking (about 90%) takes place in the southern part of Piedmont around the towns of Alba (in Cuneo), Asti and Alessandria. The Piemonte wine region is divided into five broad zones.

- Canavese – includes the areas around Turin such as Carema and Caluso
- Colline Novaresi – in the province of Novara
- Coste della Sesia – includes the area around Vercelli
- Langhe – includes the hill country around the city of Alba and the Roero.
- Monferrato – includes the areas around Asti and Alessandria

=== DOCs ===
The Piedmont region is home to 41 denominazione di origine controllata (DOC) and 19 denominazione di origine controllata e garantita (DOCG).

The 19 DOCG wines in Piedmont are:

- Alta Langa
- Asti
- Barbaresco
- Barbera d'Asti
- Barbera del Monferrato Superiore
- Barolo
- Brachetto d'Acqui, also called Acqui
- Ruchè di Castagnole Monferrato
- Canelli
- Cortese di Gavi, also simply called Gavi
- Dolcetto di Dogliani Superiore, also simply called Dogliani
- Dolcetto di Ovada Superiore, also simply called Ovada
- Dolcetto di Diano d'Alba, also simply called Diano d'Alba
- Erbaluce di Caluso, also simply called Caluso
- Gattinara
- Ghemme
- Nizza
- Roero, and Roero Arneis
- Terre Alfieri

== Grapes and wines ==
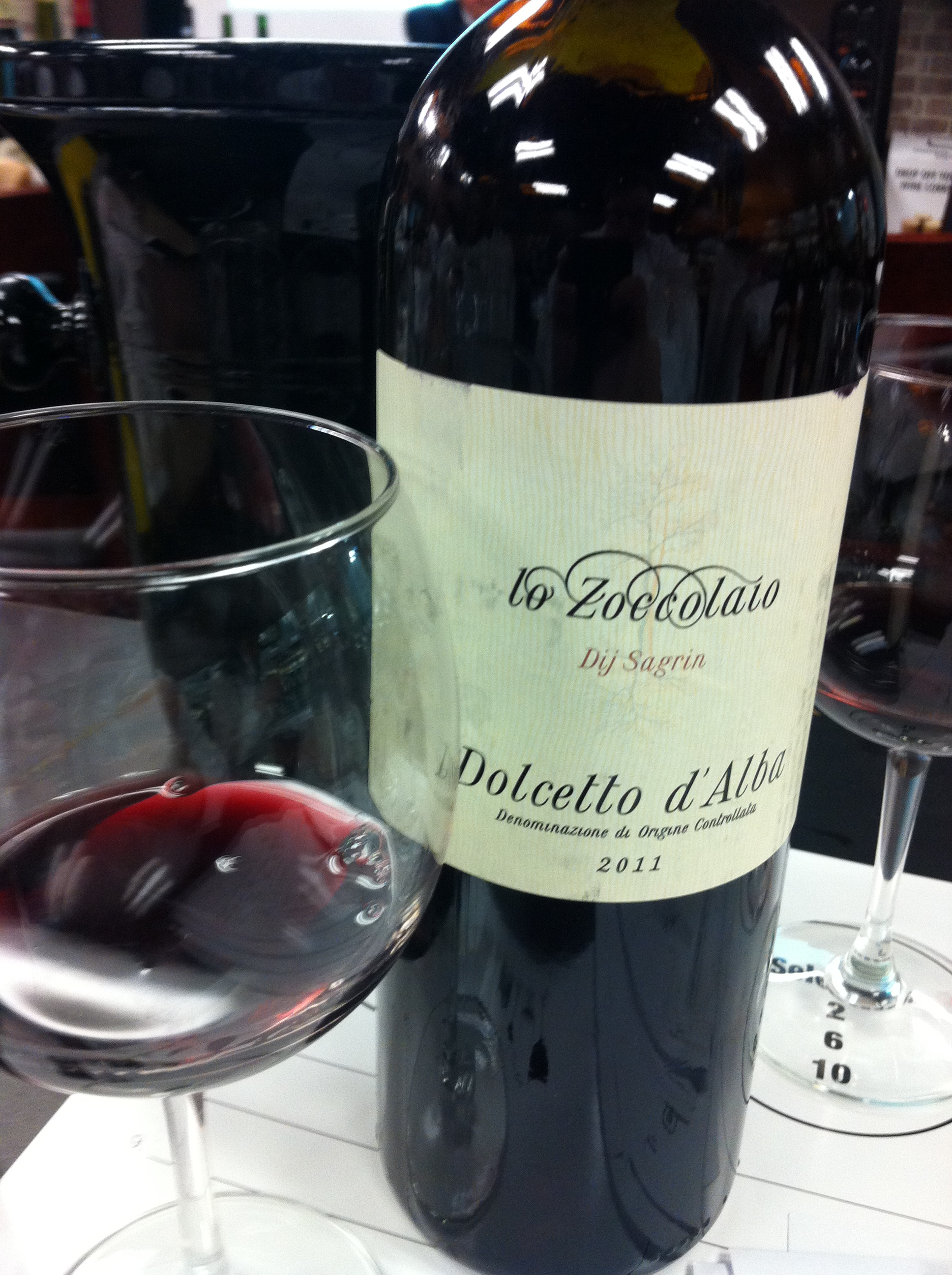
A Dolcetto d'Alba

Barbera is the most widely planted grape in the region, but Nebbiolo and Dolcetto account for a significant portion of the area's red wine production as well. With white wines, Moscato is the most prominent with its sparkling and frizzante style wines. Other notable white wines include styles made from the Cortese grape in Gavi as well as blends of Cortese with Arneis and Favorita from Colli Tortonesi and Alto Monferrato. Since the 1980s there has been growing numbers of experimental plantings with the international varieties of Cabernet Sauvignon, Chardonnay, Merlot, Pinot noir, Sauvignon blanc and Syrah. Other local or indigenous grapes include Baratuciat, Bonarda, Croatina, Erbaluce, Freisa, Gamba di Pernice, Grignolino, Grisa nera, Malvasia nera, Pelaverga, Plassa, Rossese bianco, Timorasso, Uvalino, Uva Rara and Vespolina.

The Piedmont produces more DOCG wines by volume than any other Italian wine region with nearly 84% of all the areas wine production falling under a DOCG designation. The area has no indicazione geografica tipica (IGT) classification, in contrast to Tuscany where IGT wines or Super Tuscans make up a significant portion of that region's wine production.

Some varietal style wines are made in the Piedmont region with the name of the grape and town both appearing on the label. Some DOC examples include Barbera d'Alba, Barbera d'Asti, and Dolcetto di Dogliani made entirely from the Barbera and Dolcetto grape respectively.

=== Barolo ===
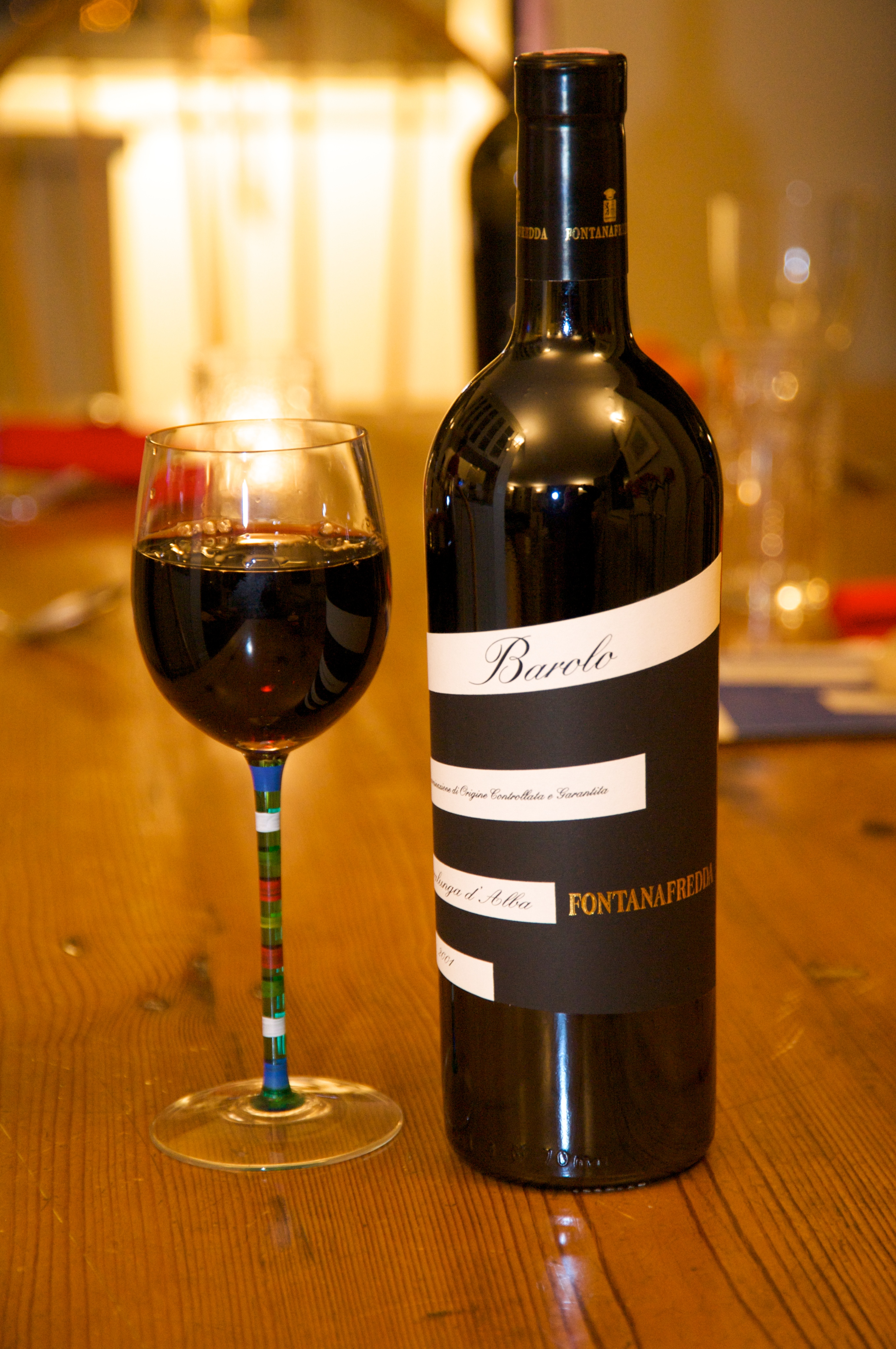
A Barolo from the Serralunga d’Alba region

In 1980, the wines of the Barolo region became one of the first Italian wines to receive DOCG status. Produced to the southwest of the town of Alba in the hills of the Langhe, Barolo is a big, tannic expression of the Nebbiolo grape. The soil of this area is a composition of clay and marl which helps to lessen the naturally high acidity of Nebbiolo. The Tanaro river flows through the heart of Barolo country and serves as a tempering influence on the region's summertime heat till harvest time in late October/mid November. A small wine region, extending over 7 miles in length and 5 miles at its widest point, Barolo produces about 500,000 cases of wine annually. Nearly 87% of the zone productions comes from vineyards in five communities: Barolo, Castiglione Falletto, La Morra, Monforte d'Alba, and Serralunga d'Alba. Wines from the Central Valley of La Morra and Barolo tend to be very perfumed and velvety with less tannins than other Barolos. The soil of the Central Valley itself is more clay based with increased levels of magnesium oxide and manganese. The wines from the Serralunga Valley are more full bodied and tannic and require aging of 12–15 years before they hit their peak. The soil of the Serralunga is heavy in sand, iron, limestone, phosphorus and potassium.

=== Barbaresco ===
Being produced from the same grape as Barolo and less than 10 miles apart, there are a lot of similarities that Barbaresco has with it neighboring wines but the slight maritime influence of the Tanaro river helps fashion distinctly different wines. Generally less tannic, Barbaresco tend to be more elegant and approachable in their youth. The Barbaresco DOCG regulation stipulates wines with minimum alcohol content of 12.5% and 2 years minimum aging in the winery for standard labels and 4 years minimum for riservas wines. Being an even smaller zone than Barolo, producers in the region produce a little more than 200,000 cases annually. The majority of Barbaresco production takes place in 3 communities: Barbaresco, Treiso and Neive. The soils in the Barbaresco zone are more uniform across the region which tends to produce a more consistent profile with the wines than what can be achieved across the widely different areas of Barolo.

=== Moscato d'Asti ===
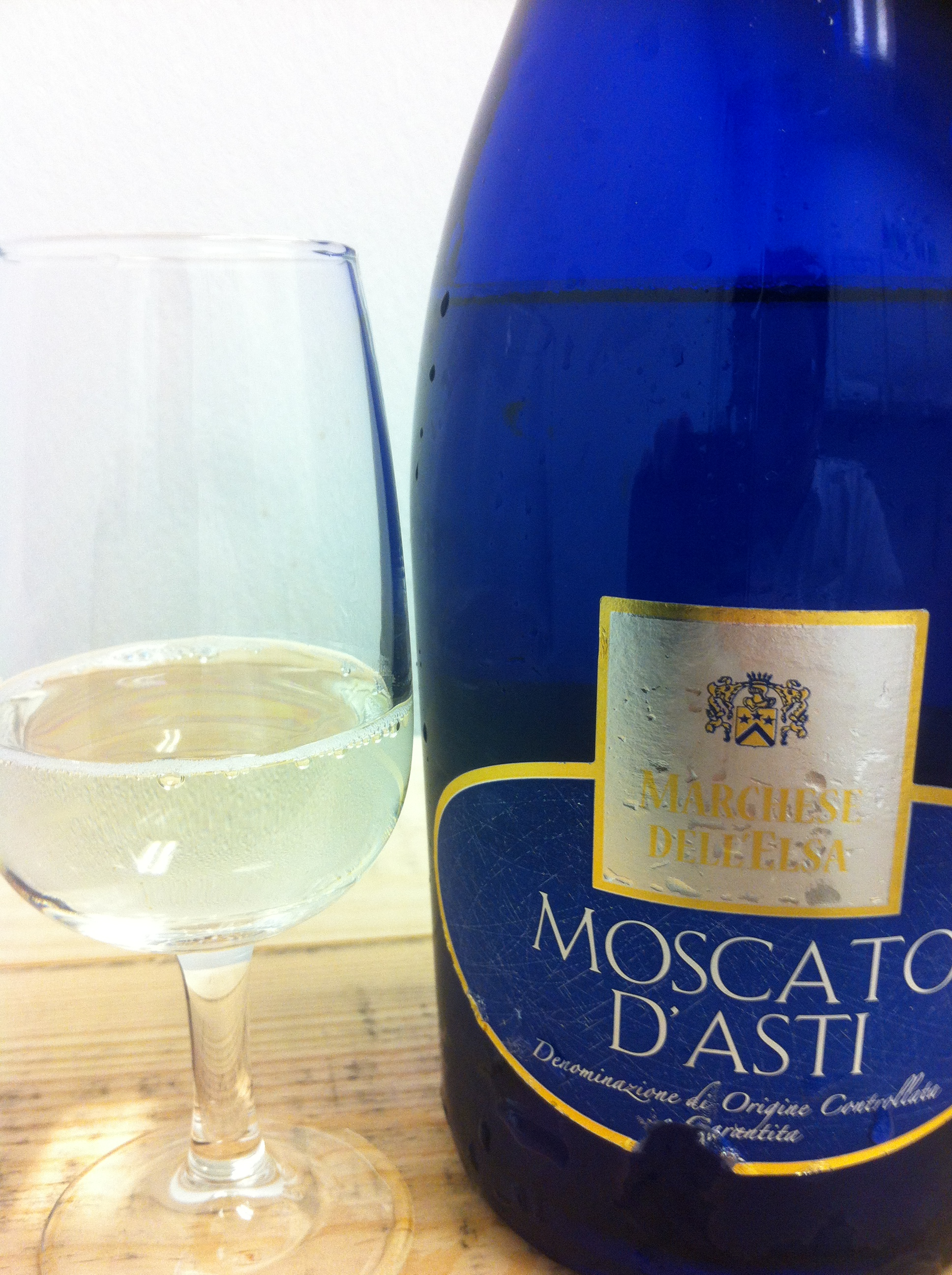
A Moscato d'Asti

The white wines made from the Moscato Bianco (also known as Muscat Blanc à Petits Grains) are most noted for their frizzante and sparkling spumante styles but some still wines are produced as well. Located northeast of Alba, the wines from the Asti region are known for their delicate light bodies, low alcohol content and slightly sweet nature. Like many sparkling wines, Asti are not vintage dated even though a majority of the grapes might all come from the same vintage year. The wines are typically at their peak between 1 and 2 years from their release.

=== Other wines ===
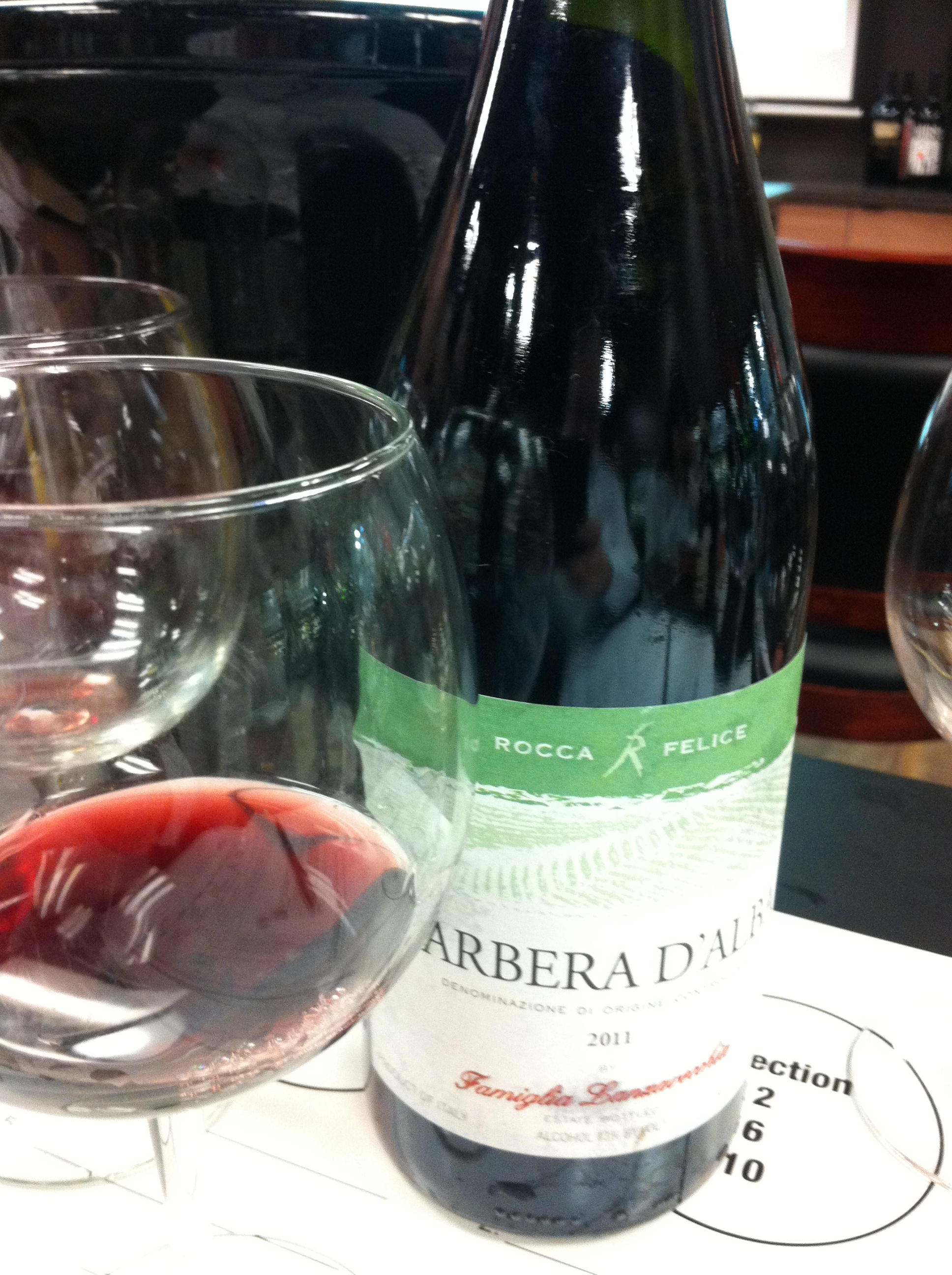
A Barbera d'Alba from Piedmont

The Barbera grape is the most widely planted variety in all of the Piedmont and makes a juicy, muscular red wine that is not as tannic as Barolo and Barbaresco. It is grown in nearly every major wine making region of the Piedmont but seems to do best in the southern part of the province of Asti in the Nizza DOCG zone. Some producers are experimenting with blending Barbera with Nebbiolo to combine the former's fruitiness with the later's structure. The light fruitiness of wines from the Dolcetto grape has caused some wine writers to describe it as the Italian version of Beaujolais. The wines have a sense of spiciness to them with little acid and tannins. They are able to be drunk relatively young and tend to be the every day drinking wines of the Piedmontese.

Up until the 1980s, when the wines of the Friuli-Venezia Giulia began to receive notice, the white wines of the Gavi region were touted as the best expression of dry Italian wine. Made primarily from the Cortese grape, these wines are noted for their dry, crisp acidity with citrus and mineral notes. The white wines made from the Arneis grape tend to be dry, vibrant and full body with notes of pears and apricots. Produced in the hills of the Roero to the northwest of Alba, the name Arneis means "rascal" in Piedmontese.

== See also ==
- Terre del Barolo
- Piedmontese cuisine
