= Mantonico bianco =

Variety of grape

Mantonico bianco is a white Italian wine grape variety grown in the Calabria wine region of southern Italy. The grape should not be confused with the similarly named Calabrian grape Montonico bianco or with Guardavalle, which is known as Mantonico in the province of Cosenza in Calabria. In the early 21st century, DNA profiling suggested that Mantonico bianco may be one of the parent varieties of the red Calabrian grape Gaglioppo which is also known as Mantonico nero.

Today Mantonico bianco is used to make both dry varietal and sweet passito-style dessert wines under several Calabrian Indicazione geografica tipica (IGT) designations. The grape is also potentially one of the permitted varieties in the Denominazione di origine controllata (DOC) wines of Bivongi and Donnici, however, the regulations for those DOCs do not differentiate between Mantonico bianco and Montonico bianco with the later most often being used in those wines.

== History and relationship to other grapes ==
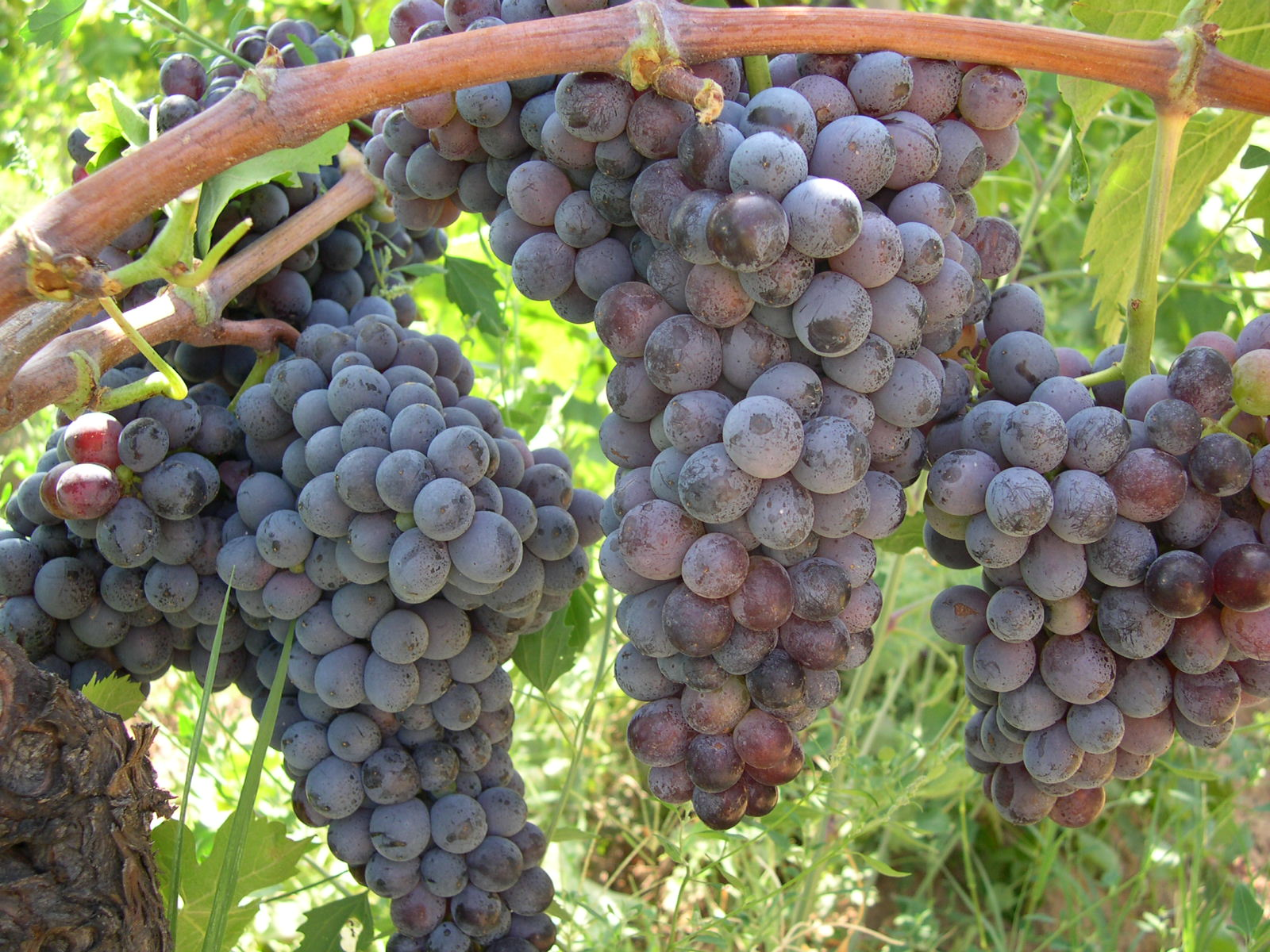
DNA evidence suggest that Mantonico bianco is one of the parent varieties to the red Calabrian wine grape Gaglioppo (pictured).

A Mantonico vine growing in Calabria was documented in the 1601 work of the Italian writer Girolamo Marafioti, who grew up in the commune of Polistena in Calabria, then part of the Kingdom of Naples. Ampelographers believe that this is the earliest mention of Mantonico bianco and that the grape is probably a native of the district of Locri in Reggio Calabria.

Over the years, Mantonico bianco has often been confused with other similarly named Calabrian grapes, including Montonico bianco and Guardavalle, which shares the synonym of Mantonico in the Cozenza province. It was also once thought that the grape was potentially a white-berried color mutation of one of the several varieties that are known as Mantonico nero, including Gaglioppo. While DNA analysis has shown that Mantonico bianco is not a color mutation, it has suggested a close relationship between the grape and Gaglioppo, with Mantonico bianco being potentially one of the parent varieties of the red Calabrian grape. Further DNA evidence suggests that Mantonico bianco may also be a parent variety of the Marchione grape of Apulia and the Sicilian grape Nerello Mascalese.

== Viticulture ==
Even in the very warm climate of southern Italy, Mantonico bianco is late ripening and often one of the last varieties to be harvested in a growing season. The grape has strong resistance to many viticultural hazards including downy and powdery mildew.

== Wine regions ==
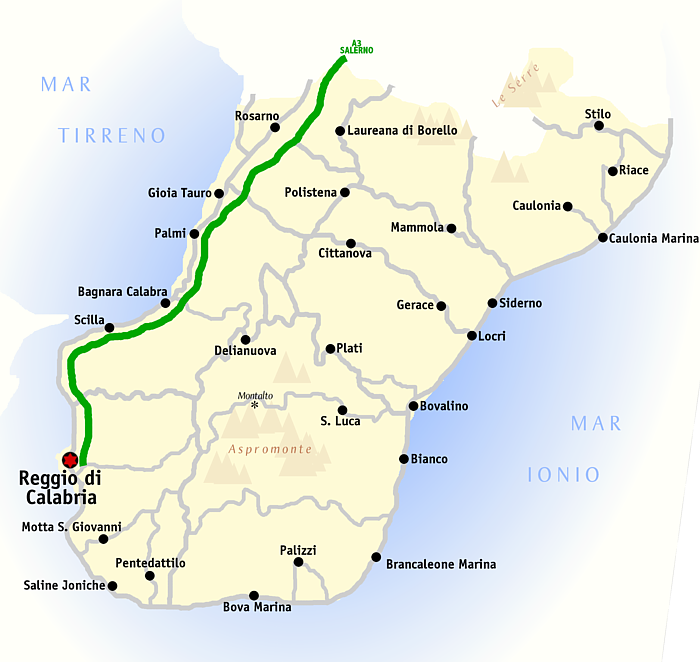
Most plantings of Mantonico bianco are found along the Ionian coast of Calabria in communes like Bianco.

Mantonico bianco is grown almost exclusively in Calabria with most plantings found along Calabria's coastline on Ionian Sea, particularly around the seaside communes of Bianco and Casignana. Here the grape is used in the production of IGT wines in both dry and passito-style wines either as a varietal or part of a blend.

Mantonico bianco can potentially be used in the DOC wines of Bivongi in the Vallata dello Stilaro of Reggio Calabria and Donnici on the La Sila plateau in the province of Cosenza but the DOC regulations do not differentiate Mantonico bianco from Montonico bianco with most producers using only the later variety in those wines.

== Styles ==
According to Master of Wine Jancis Robinson, Mantonico bianco has the potential to produce dry and sweet wines with a wide range of aroma profiles from floral to herbal to mineral with some examples having "exotic fruit" notes.

== Synonyms ==
Over the years, Mantonico bianco has been known under a variety of synonyms including: Mantonacu, Mantonica vera, Mantonico Maclugnese, Mantonico vero, Mantonicu Pizzutella, Mantonicu vera and Mantonacu Viru della Locride.
