= Magliocco =

Magliocco may refer to:

The primary name or synonym of several Italian wine grape varieties including:

- Magliocco Canino
- Magliocco Dolce
- Gaglioppo

Surname:

- Joseph J. Magliocco, wine and spirits industry executive
- Joseph Magliocco, Italian-American mobster
- Sabina Magliocco, American academic
- Karlha Magliocco, Venezuelan boxer

== See also ==
- Magliocca
- Malocchio
