= Montonico bianco =

Italian wine grape variety

Montonico bianco is a white Italian wine grape variety that is grown in the Calabria region of southern Italy. Ampelographers believe that the grape is likely of Greek origins and was transported to southern Italy by ancient Greek settlers. Though the variety has a long history in Calabria, its numbers have been slowly declining with 1100 hectares/2700 acres planted in the region by the end of the 20th century.

== Relationship to other varieties ==
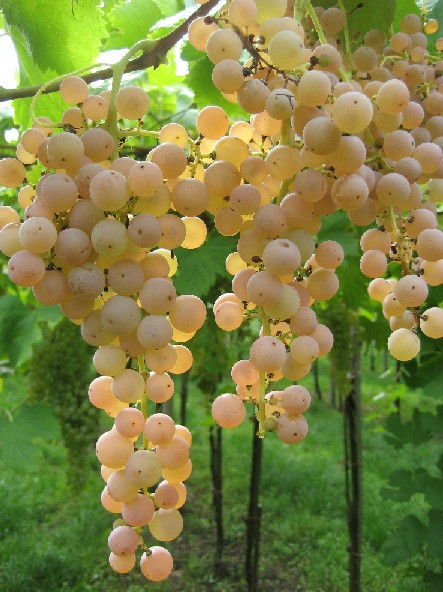
DNA evidence has shown Garganega (pictured) to be one of the parent varieties of Montonico bianco.

Recent DNA profiling has shown Garganega to be one of the parent varieties of Montonico bianco.

It is not yet clear if the grape is related to red Calabrian wine grape Gaglioppo that is also known as Mantonico/Montonico nero.

== DOC wines ==
Montonico bianco is a permitted grape variety in several Denominazione di origine controllata wines including the Bivongi DOC located on the slopes of Mount Consolino. Here Montonico makes up to 30-50% of the blend along with Greco bianco and Guardavalle with Ansonica and Malvasia bianca permitted to make up an additional 30-50% and other non-aromatic white grape varieties permitted up to 30%. Montonico grapes destined for DOC wine production must be harvested to a yield no greater than 12 tonnes/hectare with the finished wine needing to attain a minimum alcohol level of at least 10.5%.

In the Pollino DOC in southern Calabria, vineyards planted in the shadows of the Pollino massif can include Montonico bianco for blending with the Gaglioppo (Montonico nero) grape in the red wines of the DOC. While Gaglioppo makes up at least 60% of the blend and Greco nero allowed to make up to 40%, Montonico bianco is permitted up to 40% along with Guarnaccia bianca and Malvasia bianca. All other white grape varieties are limited to accounting for no more than 20% of the blend. Grapes are limited to yields of 11 tonnes/ha with the finished wines needing to reach at least 12% alcohol by volume.

== Synonyms ==
Over the years Montonico bianco has been known under a variety of synonyms including Bottato, Caprone, Ciapparone, Chiapparone, Coppa, Montanaro, Ognone, Racciapollona, Racciapollone, Raccipolluta, Roccipolluta, Roccipoluta, Trebbiano Marchigiano, Trebbiano Montanaro, Uva d'Oro di poggio delle rose, Uva di poggio delle rose, Uva Fermana, Uva Racciapoluta, Uva Roccipolluta and Uva Regno.
