= Magliocco Dolce =

Variety of grape

Magliocco Dolce (also known as Marsigliana nera) is a red Italian wine grape variety that is grown mostly in the Calabria region of southern Italy. In agricultural census counts, plantings of Magliocco Dolce are often grouped with the related, but distinct, red grape variety Magliocco Canino. Throughout history, numerous red southern Italian wine grape varieties have been variously known under the synonyms of "Magliocco" or "Magliocchi", most notably Gaglioppo, but recent DNA analysis has shown those grapes to be unrelated to Magliocco Dolce or Magliocco Canino.

== History ==
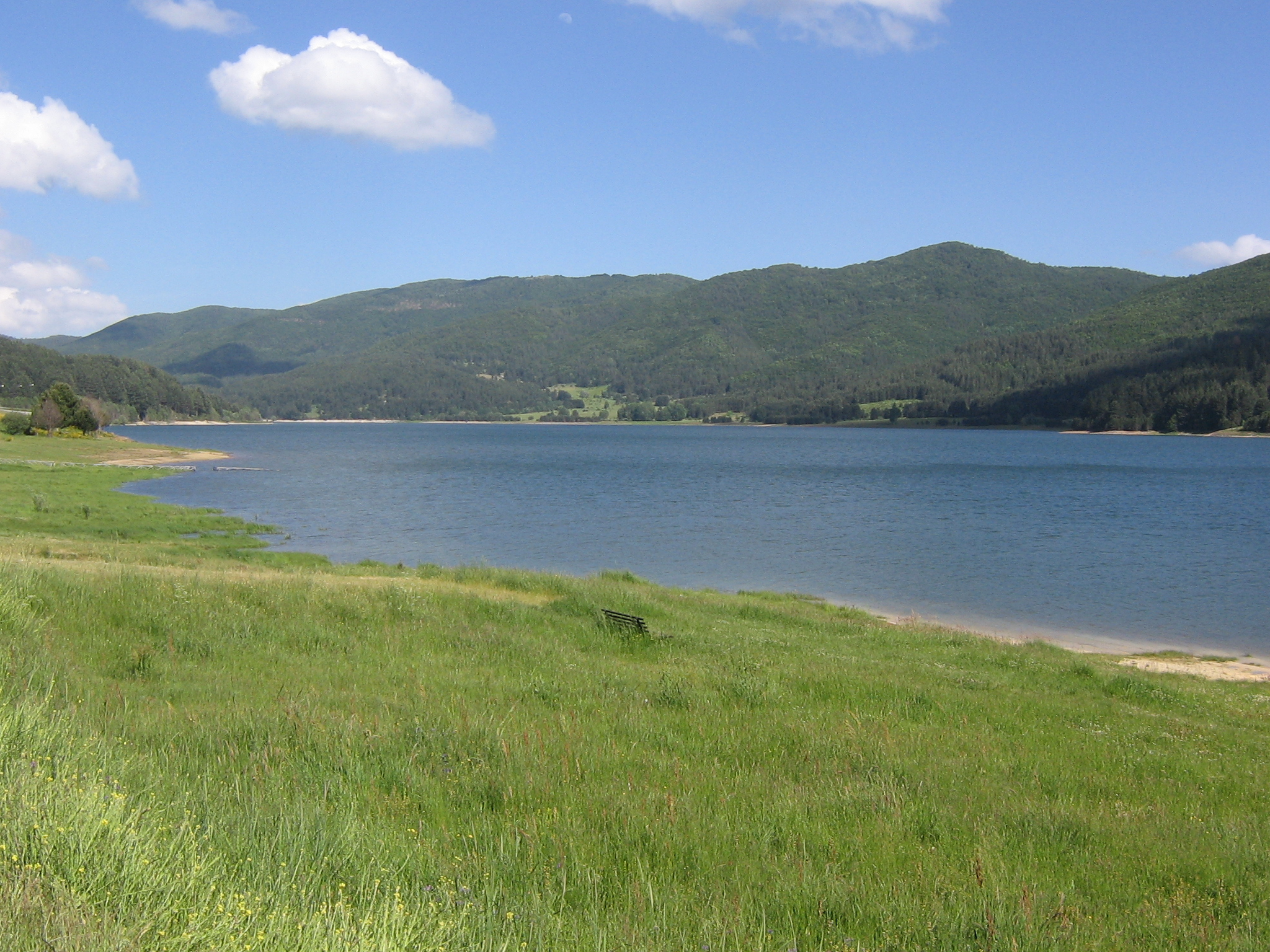
Lago Arvo on the La Sila plateau where Magliocco Dolce may have originated.

The first mention of a "Magliocca" grape dates to the late 15th century when it was documented growing in the Calabria region. Which grape this was is not yet known. Ampelographers have speculated that since the name Magliocco means "tender knot" in Greek that potentially Magliocco Dolce (or Magliocco Canino) could have originated in Greece. Additionally, Magliocco Dolce has been known under the synonym of Greco nero around the village of Lamezia Terme. DNA evidence in the early 21st century cast doubt on the validity of that theory, making it seem more likely that both grapes originated in southern Italy. The early synonym Arvino suggest that potentially Magliocco Dolce originated near Lago Arvo on the La Sila plateau that straddles the borders of the provinces of Catanzaro, Cosenza and Crotone in Calabria.

== Viticulture and confusion with other grapes ==
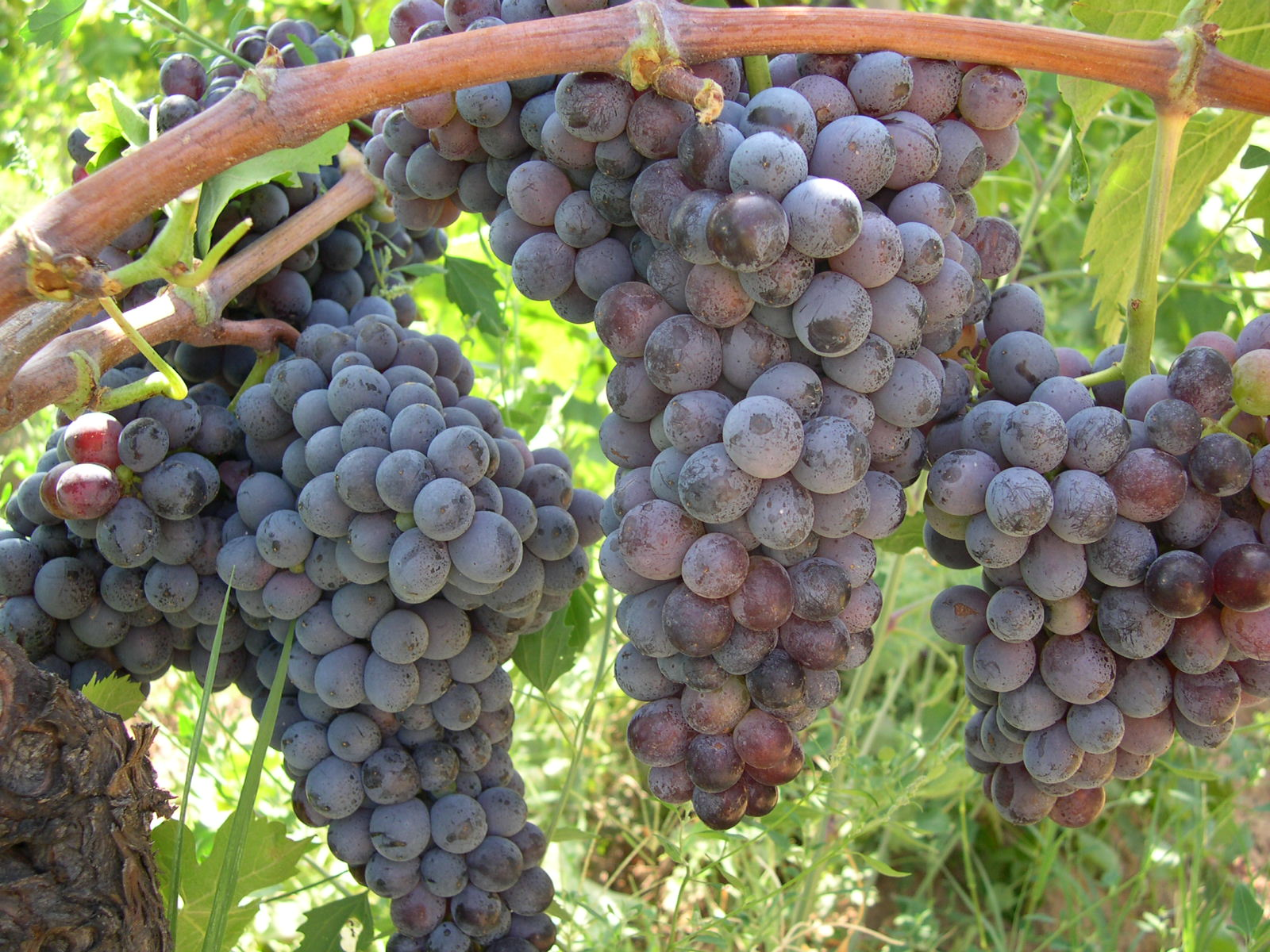
Gaglioppo, one of the grapes that Magliocco Dolce is often confused with.

Magliocco Dolce is a late ripening grape variety that tends to produce wines with high tannin levels due to the thick skins of its berries. Like Sangiovese and Savagnin, the grape variety is very prone to mutation with several clonal varieties of the grape found throughout Calabria.

Over the years, Magliocco Dolce has been confused with several other red Italian grape varieties including Gaglioppo, Magliocco Canino, Castiglione (particularly around Locride), Nerello Mascalese (in Sicily) and Nocera. In fact, the vineyard samples of Nocera planted at the University of California-Davis were identified in the early 21st century as actually being Magliocco Dolce.

== Wine regions ==
Most plantings of Magliocco Dolce can be found in northern and western Calabria in the provinces of Catanzaro, Cosenza and Crotone.

Today Magliocco Dolce is found almost exclusively in Calabria though the exact number of plantings of the grape variety is hard to determine because for many years the grape was often confused and inter-planted in field blends with other varieties. Even in the official 2000 census, plantings of Magliocco Canino and Magliocco Dolce were counted together though ampelographers believe that most of the Calabrian plantings in the provinces of Catanzaro, Cosenza and Crotone of the 616 acres (249 ha) reported are Magliocco Dolce.

== Synonyms ==
Over the years, Magliocco Dolce has been known under a variety of synonyms including: Arvino (in the provinces of Cosenza and Crotone), Catanzarese, Gaddrica (around the village of Longobardi), Greco nero (around the village of Lamezia Terme), Guarnaccia nera (around the village of Verbicaro), Lacrima Cristi nera (in the provinces of Cozenza and Reggio Calabria), Magliocco Tondo, Maglioccuni (around the village of Bivongi), Mangiaguerra (around the village of Ricadi near Capo Vaticano), Marcigliana, Marsigliana nera (around the village Lamezia Terme), Merigallo (around the village of Terravecchia), Nera di Scilla (around the village of Scalea) and Petroniere.
