= Nocera (grape) =

Variety of grape

- Grape (Vitis)
- Color of berry skin: Noir
- Species: Vitis vinifera
- Origin: Italy
- Notable regions: Sicily
- Notable wines: Faro
- Formation of seeds: Complete
- Sex of flowers: Hermaphrodite
- VIVC number: 8578

Nocera is a dark black Italian grape variety producing deeply colored, high acidity wines. It originates from the north eastern region of Sicily and is now also grown in Calabria. It is an allowed component of five DOC wines (Bivongi, Mamertino di Milazzo, Sicilia, Faro, and S. Anna di Isola Capo Rizzuto) as well as 15 IGT wines. It has good vigor but poor disease resistance.

== Synonyms ==
Barbe du sultan, Carricante nero, Nerelli, Nicera, Nocera de catane, Nocera di catania, Nocera mantonico, Nocera nera di milazzo, Nucera, Nucera niura

== See also ==
- List of Italian grape varieties
