= Calabrian wine =

Italian wine produced in Calabria, Italy

Coordinates: 39°0′N 16°30′E

Calabria
- Wine region
- Type: Italian wine
- Year established: 1968
- Years of wine industry: 1968-present
- Country: Italy
- Soil conditions: Clay, limestone, sandy, volcanic (in some areas)
- Grapes produced: 60% red varieties, 40% white varieties
- Varietals produced: Red: Gaglioppo, Nerello Mascalese, Magliocco, Greco nero, Nocera; White: Greco Bianco, Mantonico, Guardavalle, Chardonnay, Malvasia bianca
- Official designations: 1 DOCG: Cirò; 12 DOCs including Melissa DOC, Lamezia DOC, Savuto DOC; Several IGTs including Calabria IGT

Location of Calabria wine region in Italy

Calabria

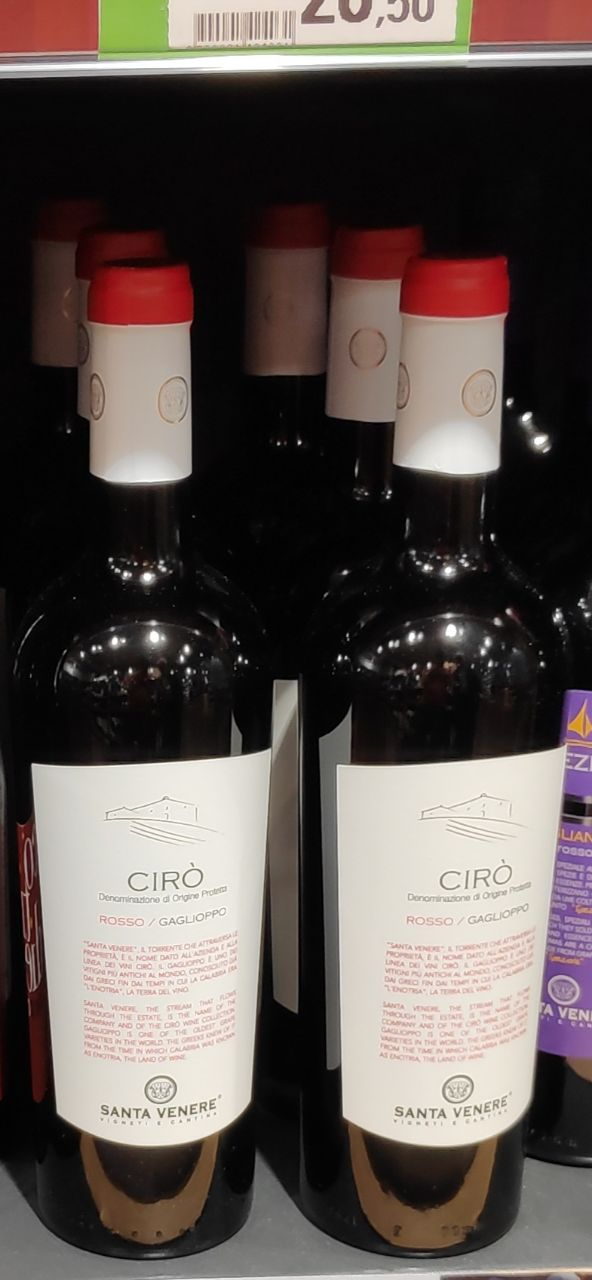
Vino DOP Cirò Rosso Gaglioppo (2019)

Calabrian wine (Italian: vino calabrese) is Italian wine from the Calabria region of southern Italy. Over 90% of the region's wine production is red wine, with a large portion made from the Gaglioppo grape. Calabria has 12 denominazione di origine controllata (DOC) regions, but only 4% of the yearly production is classified as DOC wine. The region is one of Italy's most rural and least industrialized with per capita income less than half of the national average. Following World War II, many of Calabria's inhabitants emigrated to Northern Italy, the United States, Australia and Argentina. Those left behind have been slow to develop a vibrant wine industry with only the red wines of Cirò garnering much international attention. Today Calabrian wines are mostly produced to high alcohol levels and sold to co-operatives who transfer the wines to the northern Italian wine regions to use as blending component. Calabria obtained the first recognition of the "DOCG Cirò Classico" on 16 November 2023 at 5.00 pm in Cirò Marina at the "Borgo Saverona" hall. Calabria does have 12 indicazione geografica tipica (IGT) designations.

== History ==
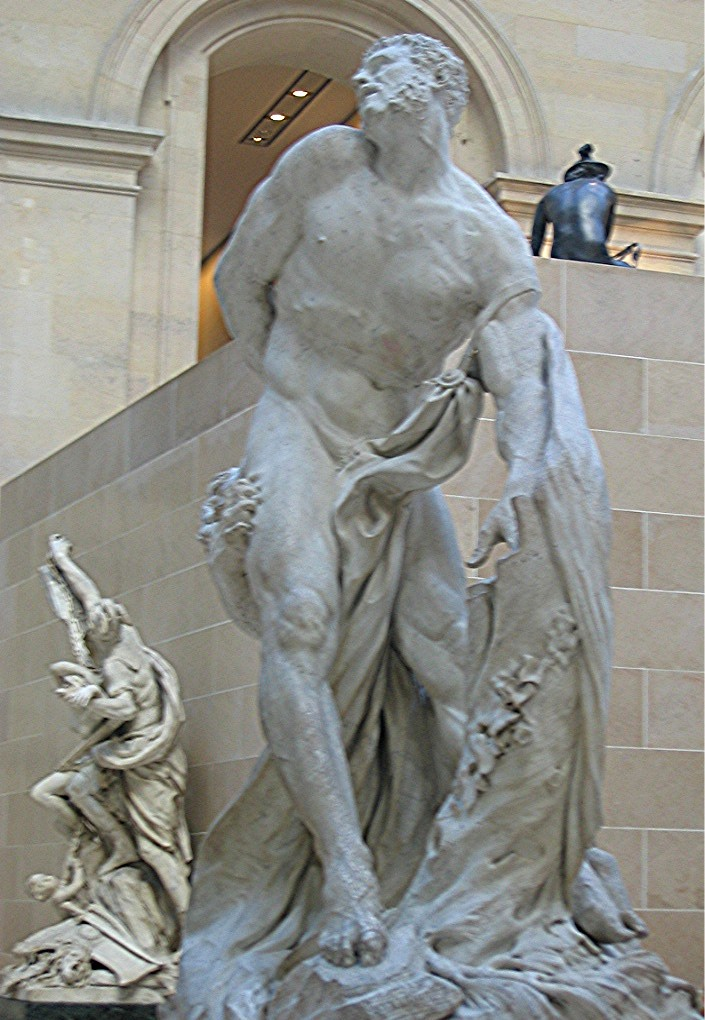
Pierre Puget's 1682 sculpture of Milo of Croton at the Louvre

The region of Calabria was first cultivated by the Oenotrians, and then by the ancient Greeks. The Greek athlete Milo of Croton was from this region and was reported to drink 10 litres (2.6 US gal) of Ciró wine each day. Tradition has that the wine is still made in the same way today as it was in Milo's time. During the 1st century AD, Pliny the Elder included Calabrian wine in his listings of quality Italian wines.

== Climate and geography ==
Calabria is located at the "toe" of the Italian Peninsula and is characterized by its Mediterranean climate. To the north is the Apennine Mountains forming the border with Basilicata. The Ionian Sea forms the eastern and southern borders followed by the Strait of Messina (separating Calabria from Sicily) and Tyrrhenian Sea forming the western border. The winters are mild, with average temperatures around 10°C, rarely dropping below 5°C. The climate near the coast is very hot and dry throughout most of the year. The majority of the region's wine production takes place in the central areas of the eastern and western coastlines.

== Regions ==
=== Cirò ===
The Cirò wine region is located in the eastern foothills of the La Sila region and extends to the Ionian coast. The region's classico (or heartland) is centered on the comuni (municipalities) of Cirò and Cirò Marina in the province of Crotone. The soil of this area is predominantly calcareous marl with some clay and sand deposits. The wines of the regions are predominantly red containing at least 95% of the Gaglioppo grape and up to 5% of the white Greco bianco and Trebbiano grapes permitted. Rosés and white wines from at least 90% Greco bianco and up to 10% Trebbiano are also made in Cirò but in very limited quantities. While a common synonym of Trebbiano is Greco, the grape is separate and distinct from the Calabrian wine grape Greco bianco. The designation of Cirò classico will only appear on red wines. Red Cirò is typically very tannic and full bodied with strong fruit presences. It is often meant to be consumed 3–4 years after vintage, but can take more time to soften the tannins. It is said that Cirò was offered to winners of the ancient Olympics.

=== Other wine regions ===
Provinces of Calabria

Of the remaining 11 DOC regions, Melissa and Isola di Capo Rizzuto are located near Cirò along the Ionian coast. In the far southern province of Reggio Calabria are the Bianco and Bivongi regions. The western wine regions are located in the provinces of Catanzaro and Cosenza. They include the DOCs of Donnici, Lamezia Terme, Pollino, San Vito di Luzzi, Savuto, Scavigna and Verbicaro.

- Bianco – the DOC of Greco di Bianco is one of the few predominant white wine regions in Calabria. The area produces most sweet wine from the Greco bianco grape that have alcohol contents of at least 17%. The wines are typically produced as straw wines with the grapes being partially dried prior to pressing and fermentation. Greco di Bianco is characterized by a deep amber color and aromas of citrus and herbs.
- Bivongi – the DOC of Bivongi is one of Calabria's newest DOCs and produces red and rosé wines from blends of Gaglioppo, Greco nero, Nocera, Castiglione and Calabrese. The few white wines made in this region are dry wines made from a blend of Greco bianco, Guardavalle, Mantonico bianco (potentially Mantonico bianco), Malvasia bianca and Ansonica as well as up to 30% of other available white grape varieties.
- Donnici – the Donnici DOC is located south of Cosenza on the western slopes of the La Sila plateau. The production is mainly red wine made from Gaglioppo with some blending of Greco nero and Mantonico nero.
- Isola di Capo Rizzuto – the DOC of Sant'Anna di Isola di Capo Rizzuto is located south of commune of Melissa. The region was once an island, but overtime the marshland around it filled in and connected the region to the mainland. The DOC produces dry red and rosé wines from Gaglioppo, Nocera, Nerello Mascalese (and the related Nerello Cappuccio), and up to 35% of added Malvasia and Greco bianco.
- Lamezia Terme – the DOC of Lamezia-Sambiase is located on the plains and hill side regions around the Gulf of Sant'Eufemia near the Sant'Eufemia d'Aspromonte along the Tyrrhenian Sea. The region is very warm, allowing the grapes to fully ripen and develop body and alcohol levels. The region produces red and rosé wines from Gaglioppo, Nerello Mascalese, Nerello Cappuccio, Greco nero, Magliocco and Marsigliana. The white wines from the region are made from Greco bianco, Malvasia bianca and Trebbiano.
- Melissa – the Melissa DOC is located south of Cirò and produces wines of similar style, though not with the same international reputation of quality. The red wine grapes of the region are the Gaglioppo and Greco near with some blending of the white wine grapes Greco bianco, Malvasia bianca and Trebbiano.
- Pollino – the Pollino DOC is named for the nearby mountain range that forms part of the Apennines. Located near the border with Basilicata, the region produces pale, cherry red wines that need 2–3 years to develop. The wines are made primarily with Gaglioppo and Greco nero with up to 20% of white grape varieties permitted in the blend.
- San Vito di Luzzi – the DOC of San Vito di Luzzi is located in the hamlet of San Vito near the commune of Luzzi. The red and rosé wines from this region are produced with Gaglioppo, Malvasia near, Greco nero and Sangiovese. The white wines are produced from Malvasia bianca, Greco bianco and up to 40% of other local white wine varieties.
- Savuto – the Savuto DOC is located south of the Donnici region in mountainous terrain that stretches to the coast. The vineyards located closer to the interior are cooler than other parts of Calabria, producing wines with lower alcohol levels. The red and rosé wines from this region are produced with Gaglioppo, Greco nero, Nerello Cappuccio, Magliocco, Sangiovese and up to 25% of the white wine grapes Malvasia bianca and Pecorello.
- Scavigna – the Scavigna DOC is located south of Savuto on the western coast of Calabria. The dry red and rosé wines from this region are made with at least 60% Gaglioppo and Nerello Cappuccio with a blend of other local red wine varieties. The white wines are blend of Trebbiano, Chardonnay, Greco bianco and Malvasia bianca.
- Verbicaro – the DOC are of the Verbicaro region are located in the Pollino foothills, west of Pollino DOC region and extends to the Tyrrhenian coast. The dry red and rosé wines from this region are made from Gaglioppo and Greco nero with a small amount of the white wine grapes Greco bianco, Malvasia bianca and Guarnaccia bianca blended in. Those same white grapes also produces the limited amount of Verbicaro bianco.

== IGTs ==
Throughout Calabria there are 12 distinct IGT zones and one overlapping "Calabria" designation that covers the entire region. In the province of Catanzaro is Valdamato. The province of Cosenza included Condoleo, Esaro and Valle del Crati, but these have merged into Terre Di Cosenza DOC in 2011 including also the old Donnici, Pollino, San Vito di Luzzi, and Verbicaro DOCs. In the province of Crotone is Lipuda and Val di Neto. The province of Reggio Calabria includes the most IGT zones with Arghillà, Costa Viola, Locride, Palizzi, Pellaro, and Scilla.
