= Magliocca =

Magliocca is a surname. Notable people with the surname include:

- Gerard Magliocca (born 1973), American law professor
- Joe Magliocca, Canadian politician

== See also ==
- Magliocco
