= Marchioni =

Marchioni is an Italian surname. Notable people with the surname include:

- Ambrogio Marchioni (1911–1995), Italian archbishop and Vatican diplomat
- Elisabetta Marchioni (or Marchionni; XVIII century), Venetian painter
- Julián Marchioni (born 1993), Argentine footballer
- Nicolò Marchioni (or Melchioni; 1662–1752), Italian violin maker based in Bologna
- Paul Marchioni (born 1955), French footballer
- Vinicio Marchioni (born 1975), Italian actor

== See also ==
- Marchione
- Marchionne
