= Magliocco Canino =

Variety of grape

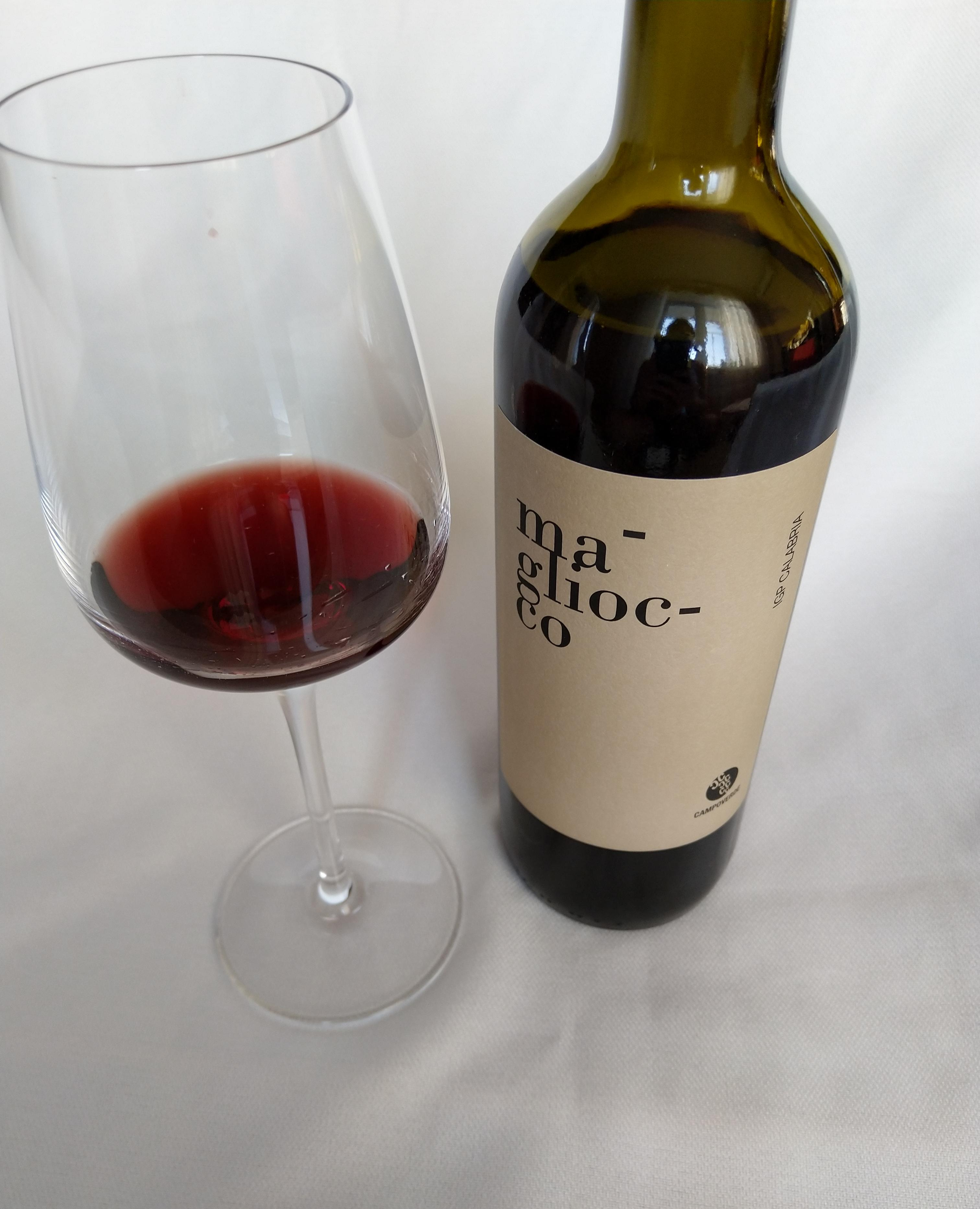
Wine from Magliocco Canino grapes.

Magliocco Canino is a red Italian wine grape variety that is predominantly grown in the Calabria region of southern Italy. It is often used as a blending grape, often with Gaglioppo of which the varieties are often confused. In the late 20th century there was just over 1,500 hectares (3,700 acres) of Magliocco Canino planted.

== Synonyms ==
Various synonyms have been used to describe Magliocco Canino and its wines, including Gaglioppo, Magliocco, Magliocco ovale and Magliuacculu.
