= List of Italian IGT wines =

A list of the Italian IGT (indicazione geografica tipica) wines, in alphabetical order by region. Note that IGT wines are not produced in Piedmont and Aosta Valley.

== Wines of the Abruzzo ==
- Alto Tirino (Bianco in the styles normale, Frizzante and Passito; Rosato in the styles normale, Frizzante and Novello; Rosso in the styles normale, Frizzante, Passito and Novello) produced in the province of L'Aquila.
- Colli Aprutini (Bianco in the styles normale, Frizzante and Passito; Rosato in the styles normale, Frizzante and Novello; Rosso in the styles normale, Frizzante, Passito and Novello) produced in the province of Teramo.
- Colli del Sangro (Bianco in the styles normale, Frizzante and Passito; Rosato in the styles normale, Frizzante and Novello; Rosso in the styles normale, Frizzante, Passito and Novello) produced in the province of Chieti.
- Colline Frentane (Bianco in the styles normale, Frizzante and Passito; Rosato in the styles normale, Frizzante and Novello; Rosso in the styles normale, Frizzante, Passito and Novello) produced in the province of Chieti.
- Colline Pescaresi (Bianco in the styles normale, Frizzante and Passito; Rosato in the styles normale, Frizzante and Novello; Rosso in the styles normale, Frizzante, Passito and Novello) produced in the province of Pescara.
- Colline Teatine (Bianco in the styles normale, Frizzante and Passito; Rosato in the styles normale, Frizzante and Novello; Rosso in the styles normale, Frizzante, Passito and Novello) produced in the province of Chieti.
- del Vastese or Histonium (Bianco in the styles normale, Frizzante and Passito; Rosato in the styles normale, Frizzante and Novello; Rosso in the styles normale, Frizzante, Passito and Novello) produced in the province of Chieti.
- Terre di Chieti (Bianco in the styles normale, Frizzante and Passito; Rosato in the styles normale, Frizzante and Novello; Rosso in the styles normale, Frizzante, Passito and Novello) produced in the province of Chieti.
- Valle Peligna (Bianco in the styles normale, Frizzante and Passito; Rosato in the styles normale, Frizzante and Novello; Rosso in the styles normale, Frizzante, Passito and Novello) produced in the province of L'Aquila.

== Wines of Apulia ==
- Daunia (Bianco in the styles normale, Frizzante and Passito; Rosato in the styles normale and Frizzante; Rosso in the styles normale, Frizzante, Passito and Novello) produced in the province of Foggia.
- Murgia (Bianco in the styles normale, Frizzante and Passito; Rosato in the styles normale and Frizzante; Rosso in the styles normale, Frizzante, Passito and Novello) produced in the province of Bari.
- Puglia (Bianco in the styles normale, Frizzante and Passito; Rosato in the styles normale and Frizzante; Rosso in the styles normale, Frizzante, Passito and Novello) produced throughout the region of Apulia.
- Salento (Bianco in the styles normale, Frizzante and Passito; Rosato in the styles normale and Frizzante; Rosso in the styles normale, Frizzante, Passito and Novello) produced in the provinces of Brindisi, Lecce and Taranto.
- Tarantino (Bianco in the styles normale, Frizzante and Passito; Rosato in the styles normale and Frizzante; Rosso in the styles normale, Frizzante, Passito and Novello) produced in the province of Taranto.
- Valle d'Itria (Bianco in the styles normale, Frizzante and Passito; Rosato in the styles normale and Frizzante; Rosso in the styles normale, Frizzante, Passito and Novello) produced in the provinces of Bari, Brindisi and Taranto.

== Wines of Basilicata ==
- Basilicata (Bianco in the styles normale and Frizzante; Rosato in the styles normale and Frizzante; Rosso in the styles normale, Frizzante and Novello) produced throughout the region of Basilicata.

== Wines of Calabria ==
- Arghillà (Rosato in the styles normale and Novello; Rosso in the styles normale and Novello) produced in the province of Reggio Calabria.
- Calabria (Bianco in the styles normale, Frizzante and Passito; Rosato; Rosso in the styles normale, Frizzante, Passito and Novello) produced throughout the region of Calabria.
- Condoleo (Rosato in the styles normale and Novello; Rosso in the styles normale and Novello) produced in the province of Cosenza.
- Costa Viola (Bianco; Rosato in the styles normale and Novello; Rosso in the styles normale and Novello) produced in the province of Reggio Calabria.
- Esaro (Bianco; Rosato in the styles normale and Novello; Rosso in the styles normale and Novello) produced in the province of Cosenza.
- Lipuda (Bianco in the styles normale and Frizzante; Rosato in the styles normale and Frizzante; Rosso in the styles normale, Frizzante and Novello) produced in the province of Crotone.
- Locride (Bianco; Rosato; Rosso in the styles normale and Novello) produced in the province of Reggio Calabria.
- Palizzi (Rosato; Rosso in the styles normale and Novello) produced in the province of Reggio Calabria.
- Pellaro (Rosato; Rosso in the styles normale and Novello) produced in the province of Reggio Calabria.
- Scilla (Rosato; Rosso in the styles normale and Novello) produced in the province of Reggio Calabria.
- Val di Neto (Bianco in the styles normale, Frizzante and Passito; Rosato in the styles normale and Frizzante; Rosso in the styles normale, Frizzante and Passito) produced in the province of Crotone.
- Valdamato (Bianco in the styles normale, Frizzante and Passito; Rosato in the styles normale and Frizzante; Rosso in the styles normale, Frizzante, Passito and Novello) produced in the province of Catanzaro.
- Valle del Crati (Bianco in the styles normale and Passito; Rosato; Rosso in the styles normale, Passito and Novello) produced in the province of Cosenza.

== Wines of Campania ==
- Falanghina del Beneventano (Bianco in the styles normale, Frizzante, Amabile and Passito; Rosato in the styles normale, Frizzante and Amabile; Rosso in the styles normale, Frizzante, Amabile, Passito and Novello) produced in the province of Benevento.
- Campania (Bianco in the styles normale, Frizzante, Amabile and Passito; Rosato in the styles normale, Frizzante, Passito, Liquoroso and Novello; Rosso in the styles normale, Frizzante, Passito, Liquoroso and Novello) produced throughout the region of Campania.
- Catalanesca del Monte Somma (Bianco in the styles normale and Passito) produced in the province of Napoli.
- Colli di Salerno (Bianco in the styles normale, Frizzante, Amabile and Passito; Rosato in the styles normale, Frizzante and Amabile; Rosso in the styles normale, Frizzante, Amabile, Passito and Novello) produced in the province of Salerno.
- Dugenta (Bianco; Rosato; Rosso in the styles normale and Novello) produced in the province of Benevento.
- Epomeo (Bianco in the styles normale and Passito; Rosato in the styles normale, Frizzante and Amabile; Rosso in the styles normale, Frizzante, Amabile, Passito and Novello) produced throughout the administrative territories of the communes lying within the island of Ischia in the province of Napoli.
- Paestum (Bianco in the styles normale, Frizzante, Amabile and Passito; Rosato in the styles normale, Frizzante and Amabile; Rosso in the styles normale, Frizzante, Amabile, Passito and Novello) produced in the province of Salerno.
- Pompeiano (Bianco in the styles normale, Frizzante, Amabile and Passito; Rosato in the styles normale, Frizzante and Amabile; Rosso in the styles normale, Frizzante, Amabile, Passito and Novello) produced throughout the administrative territory of the province of Napoli, excluding the island of Ischia.
- Roccamonfina (Bianco in the styles normale, Frizzante, Amabile and Passito; Rosato in the styles normale, Frizzante and Amabile; Rosso in the styles normale, Frizzante, Amabile, Passito and Novello) produced in the province of Caserta.
- Terre del Volturno (Bianco in the styles normale, Frizzante, Amabile and Passito; Rosato in the styles normale, Frizzante and Amabile; Rosso in the styles normale, Frizzante, Amabile, Passito and Novello) produced in the province of Caserta. Wines specifying the grape variety Asprinio may also be produced in the style Frizzante.

== Wines of Emilia-Romagna ==
- Bianco di Castelfranco Emilia (Bianco in the styles normale and Frizzante) produced in the provinces of Bologna and Modena.
- Emilia (Bianco in the styles normale and Frizzante; Rosato in the styles normale and Frizzante; Rosso in the styles normale, Frizzante and Novello) produced in the provinces of Ferrara, Modena, Parma, Piacenza, Reggio Emilia and in that part of the province of Bologna to the left of the river Sillaro.
- Fortana del Taro (Rosso in the styles normale, Frizzante and Novello) produced in the province of Parma.
- Forlì (Bianco in the styles normale and Frizzante; Rosato in the styles normale and Frizzante; Rosso in the styles normale, Frizzante and Novello) produced in the province of Forlì-Cesena.
- Modena or Provincia di Modena, produced in the province of Modena. The grape variety must be stated as one of:
  - Lambrusco (Bianco in the styles normale and Frizzante; Rosato in the styles normale and Frizzante; Rosso in the styles normale, Frizzante and Novello)
  - Malbo gentile (Rosso in the styles normale, Frizzante and Novello)
  - Trebbiano (Bianco in the styles normale and Frizzante)
- Ravenna (Bianco in the styles normale and Frizzante; Rosato in the styles normale and Frizzante; Rosso in the styles normale, Frizzante and Novello) produced in the province of Ravenna.

== Wines of Friuli-Venezia Giulia ==
- Alto Livenza (Bianco in the styles normale and Frizzante; Rosato in the styles normale and Frizzante; Rosso in the styles normale, Frizzante and Novello); an inter-regional IGT produced in the provinces of Pordenone (Friuli-Venezia Giulia) and Treviso (Veneto).
- delle Venezie N.B. Promoted to DOC in 2017 with the latest modification in 2021 (Bianco in the styles normale and Frizzante; Rosato in the styles normale and Frizzante; Rosso in the styles normale, Frizzante and Novello); an inter-regional IGT produced in the provinces of Gorizia, Pordenone, Trieste and Udine (Friuli-Venezia Giulia), Trento (Trentino-Alto Adige), Belluno, Padova, Rovigo, Treviso, Venezia, Verona and Vicenza (Veneto).
- Venezia Giulia (Bianco in the styles normale and Frizzante; Rosato in the styles normale and Frizzante; Rosso in the styles normale, Frizzante and Novello) produced in the provinces of Gorizia, Pordenone, Trieste and Udine.

== Wines of the Lazio ==
- Civitella d'Agliano (Bianco in the styles normale and Frizzante; Rosato in the styles normale and Frizzante; Rosso in the styles normale, Frizzante and Novello) produced throughout the administrative territory of the commune of Civitella d'Agliano in the province of Viterbo.
- Colli Cimini (Bianco in the styles normale, Frizzante and Novello; Rosato in the styles normale and Frizzante; Rosso in the styles normale, Frizzante and Novello) produced in the province of Viterbo.
- Frusinate or del Frusinate (Bianco in the styles normale and Frizzante; Rosato in the styles normale and Frizzante; Rosso in the styles normale, Frizzante and Novello) produced in the province of Frosinone.
- Lazio (Bianco in the styles normale and Frizzante; Rosato in the styles normale and Frizzante; Rosso in the styles normale, Frizzante and Novello; Passito) produced throughout the region of Lazio.

== Wines of Liguria ==
- Colline del Genovesato (Bianco in the styles normale and Frizzante; Rosato in the styles normale and Frizzante; Rosso in the styles normale and Frizzante) produced in the province of Genova.
- Colline Savonesi (Bianco in the styles normale, Frizzante and Passito; Rosato; Rosso in the styles normale and Novello) produced in the province of Savona.
- Golfo dei Poeti or Golfo dei poeti La Spezia (Bianco in the styles normale and Frizzante; Rosato; Rosso in the styles normale, Frizzante and Novello; Passito) produced in the province of La Spezia.

== Wines of Lombardy ==
- Alto Mincio (Bianco in the styles normale, Frizzante and Passito; Rosato in the styles normale and Frizzante; Rosso in the styles normale, Frizzante, Passito and Novello) produced in the province of Mantova.
- Benaco Bresciano (Bianco in the styles normale and Frizzante; Rosso in the styles normale and Novello) produced in the province of Brescia.
- Bergamasca (Bianco; Rosato; Rosso in the styles normale, Moscato and Novello) produced in the province of Bergamo.
- Collina del Milanese (Bianco in the styles normale, Frizzante and Passito; Rosato in the styles normale and Frizzante; Rosso in the styles normale, Frizzante and Novello) produced in the provinces of Lodi, Milano and Pavia.
- Montenetto di Brescia (Bianco in the styles normale and Frizzante; Rosso in the styles normale and Novello) produced in the province of Brescia.
- province of Mantova (Bianco in the styles normale, Frizzante and Passito; Rosato in the styles normale and Frizzante; Rosso in the styles normale, Frizzante, Passito and Novello) produced in the province of Mantova.
- province of Pavia (Bianco in the styles normale and Frizzante; Rosato in the styles normale and Frizzante; Rosso in the styles normale, Frizzante and Novello) produced in the province of Pavia.
- Quistello (Bianco in the styles normale and Frizzante; Rosato in the styles normale and Frizzante; Rosso in the styles normale, Frizzante and Novello) produced in the province of Mantova.
- Ronchi di Brescia (Bianco in the styles normale, Frizzante and Passito; Rosso in the styles normale and Novello) produced in the province of Brescia.
- Sabbioneta (Bianco in the styles normale and Frizzante; Rosato in the styles normale and Frizzante; Rosso in the styles normale, Frizzante and Novello) produced in the province of Mantova.
- Sebino (Bianco Passito; Rosso in the styles normale and Novello) produced in the province of Brescia.
- Terrazze Retiche di Sondrio (Bianco; Rosato in the styles normale and Frizzante; Rosso in the styles normale and Novello) produced in the province of Sondrio.
- Valcamonica (Bianco in the styles normale and Passito; Rosso in the styles normale, where one of the following grape varieties may be indicated: Marzemino or Merlot)

== Wines of the Marche ==
- Marche (Bianco in the styles normale and Frizzante; Rosato in the styles normale and Frizzante; Rosso in the styles normale, Frizzante and Novello) produced throughout the region of Marche.

== Wines of Molise ==
- Rotae (Bianco in the styles normale, Frizzante and Passito; Rosato in the styles normale and Frizzante; Rosso in the styles normale, Frizzante and Novello) produced in the province of Isernia.
- Osco or Terre degli Osci (Bianco in the styles normale, Frizzante and Passito; Rosato in the styles normale and Frizzante; Rosso in the styles normale, Frizzante and Novello) produced in the province of Campobasso.

== Wines of Piedmont ==
No IGT wines are produced in Piedmont.

== Wines of Sardinia ==
- Barbagia (Bianco in the styles normale and Frizzante; Rosato in the styles normale and Frizzante; Rosso in the styles normale, Frizzante and Novello) produced in the province of Nuoro.
- Colli del Limbara (Bianco in the styles normale and Frizzante; Rosato in the styles normale and Frizzante; Rosso in the styles normale, Frizzante and Novello) produced in the provinces of Sassari, Olbia-Tempio and Nuoro.
- Isola dei Nuraghi (Bianco in the styles normale and Frizzante; Rosato in the styles normale and Frizzante; Rosso in the styles normale, Frizzante and Novello) produced throughout the region of Sardegna
- Marmilla (Bianco in the styles normale and Frizzante; Rosato in the styles normale and Frizzante; Rosso in the styles normale, Frizzante and Novello) produced in the provinces of Cagliari and Oristano.
- Nurra (Bianco in the styles normale and Frizzante; Rosato in the styles normale and Frizzante; Rosso in the styles normale, Frizzante and Novello) produced in the province of Sassari.
- Ogliastra (Bianco in the styles normale and Frizzante; Rosato in the styles normale and Frizzante; Rosso in the styles normale, Frizzante and Novello) produced in the provinces of Cagliari and Nuoro.
- Parteolla (Bianco in the styles normale and Frizzante; Rosato in the styles normale and Frizzante; Rosso in the styles normale, Frizzante and Novello) produced in the province of Cagliari.
- Planargia (Bianco in the styles normale and Frizzante; Rosato in the styles normale and Frizzante; Rosso in the styles normale, Frizzante and Novello) produced in the provinces of Nuoro and Oristano.
- Provincia di Nuoro (Bianco in the styles normale and Frizzante; Rosato in the styles normale and Frizzante; Rosso in the styles normale, Frizzante and Novello) produced in the province of Nuoro.
- Romangia (Bianco in the styles normale and Frizzante; Rosato in the styles normale and Frizzante; Rosso in the styles normale, Frizzante and Novello) produced in the province of Sassari.
- Sibiola (Bianco in the styles normale and Frizzante; Rosato in the styles normale and Frizzante; Rosso in the styles normale, Frizzante and Novello) produced in the province of Cagliari.
- Tharros (Bianco in the styles normale and Frizzante; Rosato in the styles normale and Frizzante; Rosso in the styles normale, Frizzante and Novello) produced in the province of Oristano.
- Trexenta (Bianco in the styles normale and Frizzante; Rosato in the styles normale and Frizzante; Rosso in the styles normale, Frizzante and Novello) produced in the province of Cagliari.
- Valle del Tirso (Bianco in the styles normale and Frizzante; Rosato in the styles normale and Frizzante; Rosso in the styles normale, Frizzante and Novello) produced in the province of Oristano.
- Valli di Porto Pino (Bianco in the styles normale and Frizzante; Rosato in the styles normale and Frizzante; Rosso in the styles normale, Frizzante and Novello) produced in the province of Cagliari.

== Wines of Sicily ==
- Camarro (Bianco in the styles normale and Frizzante; Rosato in the styles normale and Frizzante; Rosso in the styles normale, Frizzante and Novello) produced in the province of Trapani.
- Colli Ericini (Bianco in the styles normale and Frizzante; Rosato in the styles normale and Frizzante; Rosso in the styles normale and Frizzante) produced in the province of Trapani.
- Fontanarossa di Cerda (Bianco in the styles normale and Frizzante; Rosato in the styles normale and Frizzante; Rosso in the styles normale, Frizzante and Novello) produced throughout the administrative territory of the commune of Cerda in the province of Palermo.
- Salemi (Bianco in the styles normale and Frizzante; Rosato in the styles normale and Frizzante; Rosso in the styles normale, Frizzante and Novello) produced throughout the administrative territory of the commune of Salemi in the province of Trapani.
- Salina (Bianco in the styles normale and Frizzante; Rosato in the styles normale and Frizzante; Rosso in the styles normale, Frizzante and Novello) produced throughout the administrative territory of the Isole Eolie in the province of Messina.
- Sicilia (Bianco in the styles normale, Frizzante and Liquoroso; Rosato in the styles normale and Frizzante; Rosso in the styles normale, Frizzante, Liquoroso and Novello) produced throughout the region of Sicilia.
- Valle Belice (Bianco in the styles normale and Frizzante; Rosato in the styles normale and Frizzante; Rosso in the styles normale, Frizzante and Novello) produced in the province of Agrigento.

== Wines of Tuscany ==
- Alta Valle della Greve (Bianco; Rosato; Rosso in the styles normale and Novello) produced in the province of Firenze.
- Colli della Toscana Centrale (Bianco in the styles normale and Frizzante; Rosato; Rosso in the styles normale and Novello) produced in the provinces of Arezzo, Firenze, Pistoia, Prato and Siena.
- Maremma Toscana (Bianco in the styles normale and Frizzante; Rosato; Rosso in the styles normale and Novello) produced in the province of Grosseto.
- Toscano or Toscana (Bianco in the styles normale, Frizzante and Abboccato; Rosato in the styles normale and Abboccato; Rosso in the styles normale, Abboccato and Novello) produced throughout the region of Toscana.
- Val di Magra (Bianco; Rosato; Rosso in the styles normale and Novello) produced in the province of Massa Carrara.

== Wines of Trentino-Alto Adige/Südtirol ==
- Atesino delle Venezie (Bianco in the styles normale and Frizzante; Rosato in the styles normale and Frizzante; Rosso in the styles normale, Frizzante and Novello); produced in the province of Trento.
- delle Venezie N.B. Promoted to DOC in 2017 with the latest modification in 2021 (Bianco in the styles normale and Frizzante; Rosato in the styles normale and Frizzante; Rosso in the styles normale, Frizzante and Novello); an inter-regional IGT produced in the provinces of Trento (Trentino-Alto Adige), Gorizia, Pordenone, Trieste and Udine (Friuli-Venezia Giulia), Belluno, Padova, Rovigo, Treviso, Venezia, Verona and Vicenza (Veneto).
- Mitterberg or Mitterberg zwischen Gfrill und Toll or Mitterberg tra Cauria and Tel (Weiss, or Bianco, in the styles normale and Frizzante; Rosé o Rosato in the styles normale and Frizzante; Rot, or Rosso, in the styles normale, Frizzante and Novello) produced in the province of Bolzano.
- Vallagarina (Bianco in the styles normale and Frizzante; Rosato in the styles normale and Frizzante; Rosso in the styles normale, Frizzante and Novello); an inter-regional IGT produced in the provinces of Trento (Trentino-Alto Adige) and Verona (Veneto).
- Vigneti delle Dolomiti or Weinberg Dolomiten (Weiss, or Bianco, in the styles normale and Frizzante; Rosé o Rosato in the styles normale and Frizzante; Rot, or Rosso, in the styles normale, Frizzante and Novello) produced in the provinces of Bolzano and Trento.

== Wines of Umbria ==
- Allerona (Bianco in the styles normale, Frizzante, Passito and Novello; Rosato in the styles normale, Frizzante and Novello; Rosso in the styles normale, Frizzante, Passito and Novello) produced in the province of Terni.
- Bettona (Bianco in the styles normale and Frizzante; Rosato in the styles normale and Novello; Rosso in the styles normale and Novello) produced throughout the administrative territory of the commune of Bettona in the province of Perugia.
- Cannara (Rosso in the styles normale and Passito) produced throughout the administrative territories of the communes of Bettona, Bevagna and Cannara in the province of Perugia.
- Narni (Bianco in the styles normale, Frizzante and Passito; Rosato in the styles normale and Novello; Rosso in the styles normale, Passito and Novello) produced in the province of Terni.
- Spello (Bianco; Rosato; Rosso) produced throughout the administrative territory of the commune of Spello in the province of Perugia.
- Umbria (Bianco in the styles normale, Frizzante, Passito and Novello; Rosato in the styles normale, Frizzante and Novello; Rosso in the styles normale, Frizzante, Passito and Novello) produced throughout the region of Umbria.

== Wines of the Valle d'Aosta ==
No IGT wines are produced in the Valle d'Aosta.

== Wines of the Veneto ==
- Alto Livenza (Bianco in the styles normale and Frizzante; Rosato in the styles normale and Frizzante; Rosso in the styles normale, Frizzante and Novello); an inter-regional IGT produced in the provinces of Treviso (Veneto) and Pordenone (Friuli-Venezia Giulia).
- Colli Trevigiani (Bianco in the styles normale and Frizzante; Rosato in the styles normale and Frizzante; Rosso in the styles normale, Frizzante and Novello); produced in the province of Treviso.
- Conselvano (Bianco in the styles normale and Frizzante; Rosato in the styles normale and Frizzante; Rosso in the styles normale, Frizzante and Novello); produced in the province of Padova.
- delle Venezie N.B. Promoted to DOC in 2017 with the latest modification in 2021 (Bianco in the styles normale and Frizzante; Rosato in the styles normale and Frizzante; Rosso in the styles normale, Frizzante and Novello); an inter-regional IGT produced in the provinces of Belluno, Padova, Rovigo, Treviso, Venezia, Verona and Vicenza (Veneto), Gorizia, Pordenone, Trieste and Udine (Friuli-Venezia Giulia) and Trento (Trentino-Alto Adige).
- Marca Trevigiana (Bianco in the styles normale and Frizzante; Rosato in the styles normale and Frizzante; Rosso in the styles normale, Frizzante and Novello); produced in the province of Treviso.
- Provincia di Verona (Bianco in the styles normale and Frizzante; Rosato in the styles normale and Frizzante; Rosso in the styles normale, Frizzante and Novello); produced in the province of Verona.
- Vallagarina (Bianco in the styles normale and Frizzante; Rosato in the styles normale and Frizzante; Rosso in the styles normale, Frizzante and Novello); an inter-regional IGT produced in the provinces of Verona (Veneto) and Trento (Trentino-Alto Adige).
- Veneto (Bianco in the styles normale, Frizzante, Amabile and Passito; Rosato in the styles normale, Frizzante and Amabile; Rosso in the styles normale, Frizzante, Amabile, Passito and Novello) produced throughout the region of Veneto.

== See also ==
- List of Italian DOC wines
- List of Italian DOCG wines
- Italian wine
