= Joseph J. Magliocco =

American businessman (born 1957)

- Born: October 14, 1957 (age 68)
- Other name: Joe
- Education: Harvard Law School, J.D. (1982); Yale College, B.A. (1979) summa cum laude
- Occupations: Lawyer, businessman
- Known for: Wine and Spirits Products
- Spouse: Allison Fillmore Magliocco (m. 2005–2021)
- Children: Matthew T. Magliocco
- Parents: Tony Magliocco (father); Josephine Magliocco (mother)
- Website: www.josephjmagliocco.com

Joseph J. Magliocco (born October 14, 1957) is an American wine and spirits industry executive who has developed creative and newsworthy wine and spirits products. His work has been written about in publications like Financial Times, Food & Wine, Fortune, GQ, Maxim, New York Magazine, Robb Report, The Chicago Tribune, Courier Journal, The Los Angeles Times, The New York Times, The New Yorker, The Oakland Tribune, The San Francisco Chronicle, USA Today, Wine Enthusiast, and other notable publications.

== Education ==
After going to Berkeley and Poly Prep in New York City for grammar and high school, Magliocco matriculated at Yale College. After graduating from Yale in the spring of 1979, Magliocco studied law and in 1982 received a degree from Harvard Law School.

== Career ==
After his admission to the New York State Bar in 1983, Magliocco began a career in the wine and spirits industry.

In the 1990s, with "brown" spirits in decline and rye, America's first whiskey, on the verge of extinction, Magliocco teamed up with former Austin Nichols president Dick Newman to resurrect Michter's, a whiskey brand that traces its legacy back to America's first whiskey company.

== Other work ==
Magliocco was a speaker for the Traphagen Distinguished Alumni Speakers Series (TDASS) at Harvard University in April 2011. This series invites Harvard Law School alumni back to campus to speak informally with students about their careers.
