= Marchione =

Marchione is an Italian surname. Notable people with the surname include:

- Carlo Marchione (born 1964), Italian classical guitarist
- Frankie Grande Marchione (born 1983), American YouTuber and television host
- Kathy Marchione (born c. 1955), American politician
- Margherita Marchione (1922–2021), American Roman Catholic nun, writer, teacher and apologetic

== See also ==
- Marchioni
- Marchione Guitars, an American guitar manufacturing company
