= Verbicaro =

Verbicaro Greek: Berbekáris
- Comune
- Comune di Verbicaro
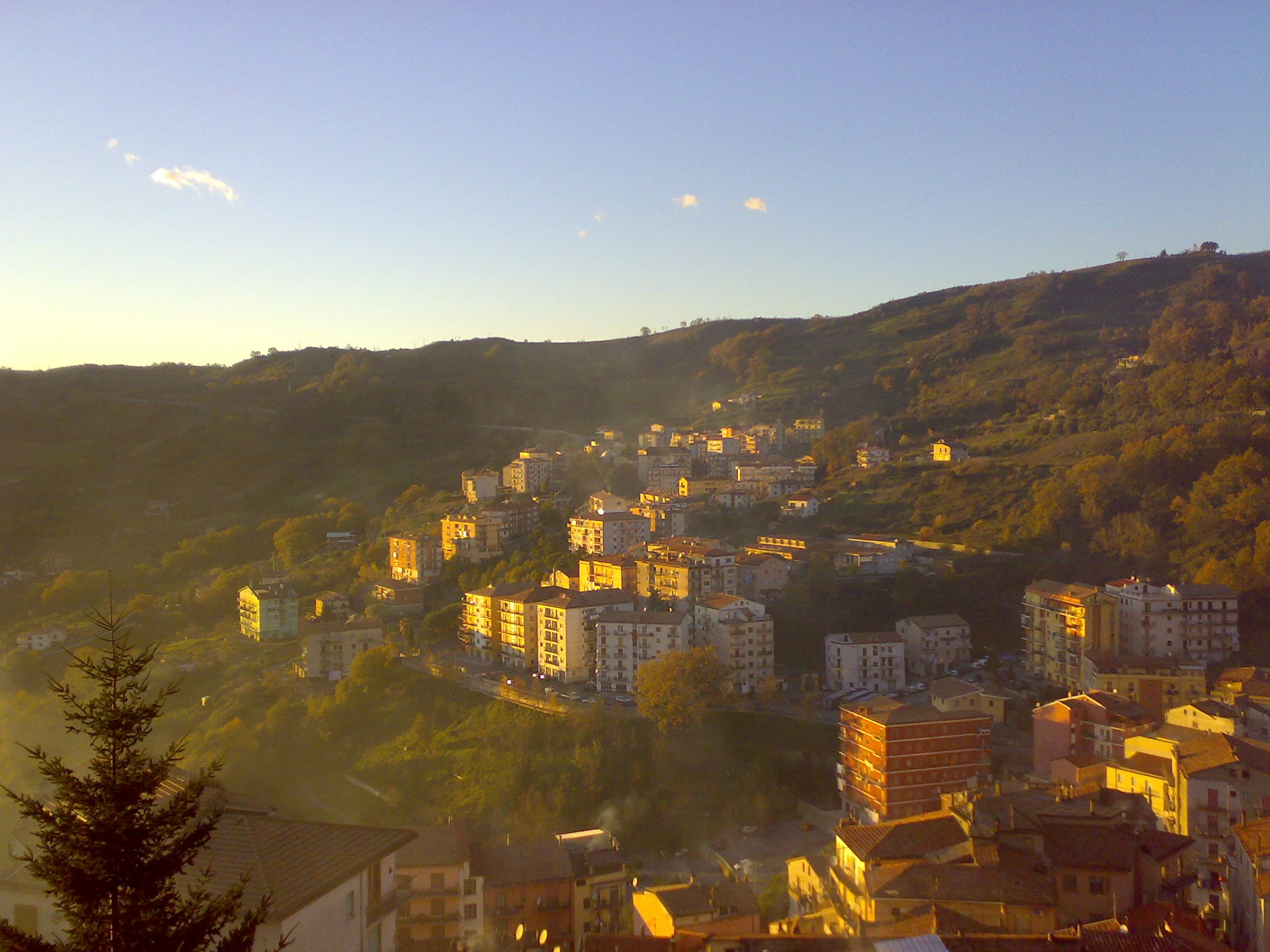

- Location within Italy Location within Calabria
- Coordinates: 39°45′N 15°55′E
- Country: Italy
- Region: Calabria
- Province: Cosenza (CS)
- Frazioni: San Francesco

Government
  - Mayor: Felice Spingola

Area
  - Total: 32.64 km^{2} (12.60 sq mi)
- Elevation: 428 m (1,404 ft)

Population (31 May 2016)
  - Total: 3,037
  - Density: 93.05/km^{2} (241.0/sq mi)
- Demonym: Verbicaresi
- Time zone: UTC+1 (CET)
  - Summer (DST): UTC+2 (CEST)
- Postal code: 87020
- Dialing code: 0985
- Patron saint: Our Lady of Graces
- Saint day: 2 July
- Website: Official website

Verbicaro (Calabrian: Vruvëcàrë) is a town and comune in the province of Cosenza in, Calabria, southern Italy.

== International relations ==
Verbicaro is twinned with Oberstenfeld, Germany
