= Indicazione geografica tipica =

Italian wine classification

Indicazione geografica tipica (Italian: [indikatˈtsjoːne dʒeoˈɡraːfika ˈtiːpika]) is the third of four classifications of wine recognized by the government of Italy. Created to recognize the unusually high quality of the class of wines known as Super Tuscans, IGT wines are labeled with the locality of their creation. However, they do not meet the requirements of the stricter DOC or DOCG designations, which are generally intended to protect traditional wine formulations such as Chianti or Barolo. It is considered broadly equivalent to the former French vin de pays classification (which is now generally protected as protected geographical indication; French: indication géographique protégée) under EU law. Wines from the Aosta Valley, where the French language is co-official, may state Vin de pays on the label in place of Indicazione geografica tipica. This classification is seen to be a higher quality wine than vino da tavola.

In 2022, Italy's National Wine Committee and Agricultural Ministry granted Abruzzo's wines a unique IGT, Terre d’Abruzzo.

== See also ==
- List of Italian IGT wines
- Geographical indications and traditional specialities in the European Union
- Traditional food
