= Gaglioppo =

Variety of grape

- Grape (Vitis)
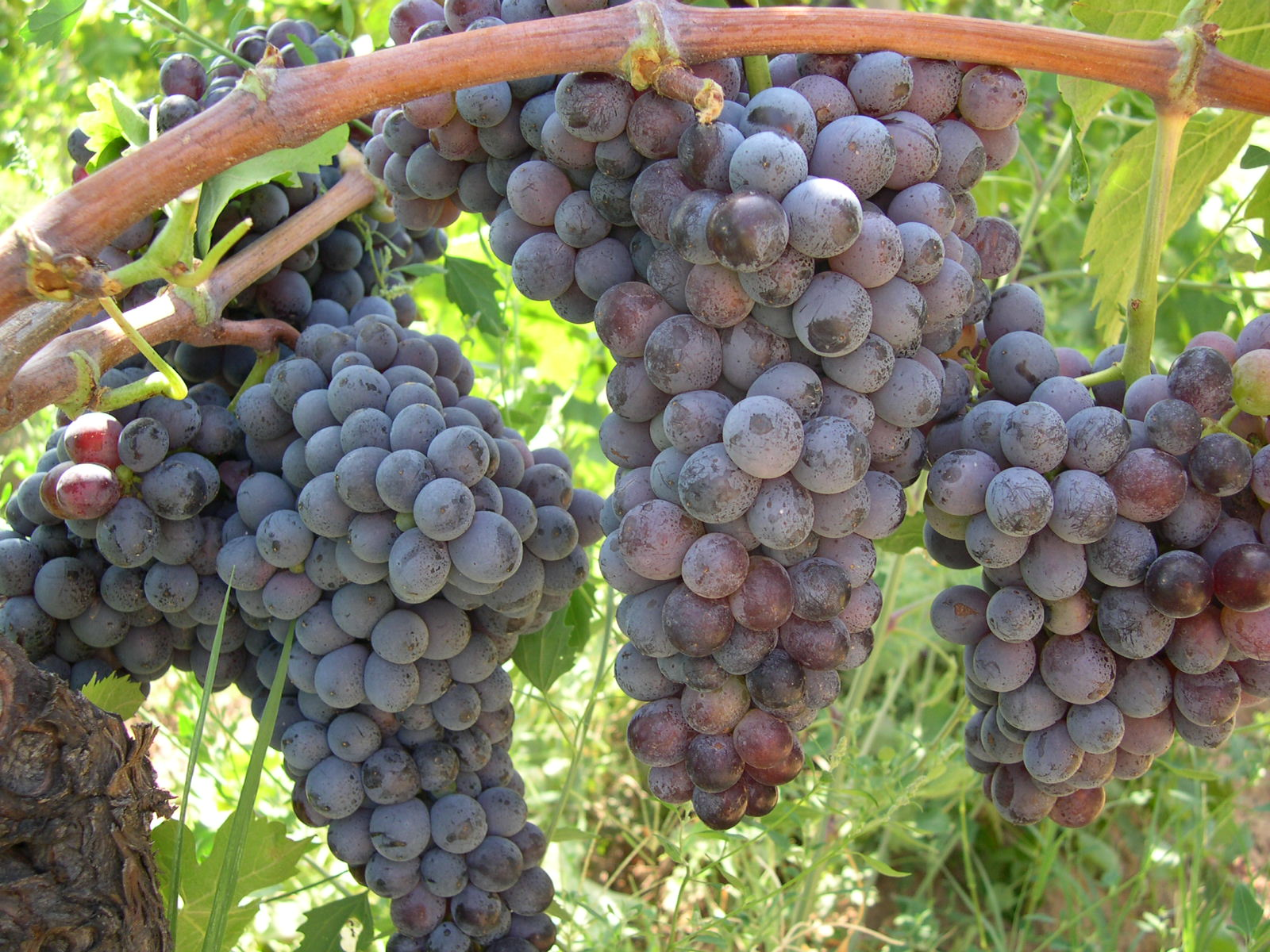
- Color of berry skin: Noir
- Species: Vitis vinifera
- Origin: Italy
- Notable regions: Calabria
- VIVC number: 4306

Gaglioppo is a red wine grape that is grown in southern Italy, primarily around Calabria. The vine performs well in drought conditions but is susceptible to oidium and peronospora. The grape produces wine that is full-bodied, high in alcohol and tannins with a need for considerable time in the bottle for it to soften in character. It is sometimes blended with up to 10% white wine.

== Origin ==
Gaglioppo has previously been thought to be of Greek origin, but recent studies using DNA profiling instead indicate an Italian origin. The grape is believed to be an offspring of the Calabrian wine grape Mantonico bianco. It was previously claimed that it was introduced to southern Italy around the same time as the Aglianico vine.

An Italian study published in 2008 using DNA typing showed a close genetic relationship between Sangiovese on the one hand and ten other Italian grape varieties on the other hand, including Gaglioppo. It is therefore likely that Gaglioppo is a crossing of Sangiovese and another, so far unidentified, grape variety.

== Synonyms ==
Gaglioppo is also known under the synonyms Aglianico di Cassano, Arvino, Gaglioppa, Gaglioppa nera, Gaglioppo di Ciro, Gaglioppo nero, Gaglioppo Paesano, Gagliuoppo, Gaioppo, Galaffa, Galloffa, Galloppo, Galloppolo, Galoffa, Lacrima di Cosenza, Lacrima nera, Lancianese, Latifolia, Maghioccu nero, Magliocco, Magliocco Antico, Magliocco Dolce, Magliocco Tondo, Magliocolo nero, Maioppa, Mantonico nero, Montonico nero, and Uva Navarra.
