= Denominazione di origine controllata =

Quality assurance label for Italian wine products

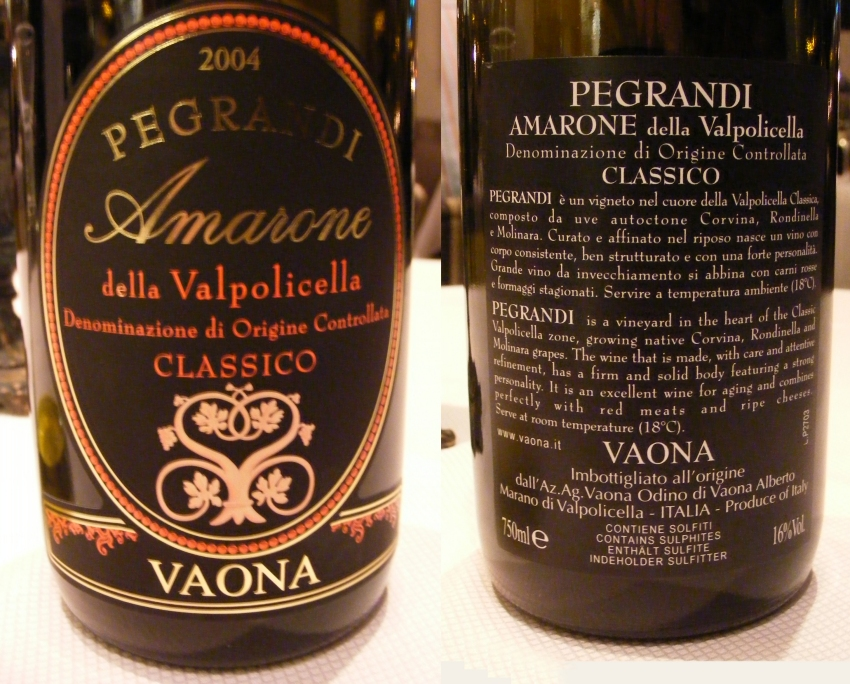
Labels of the Italian wine Amarone della Valpolicella Classico 2004 from the Pegrandi vineyard produced by Vaona. The label indicates that this is a DOC class wine from the Classico region of Valpolicella.

The following four classifications of wine constitute the Italian system of labelling and legally protecting Italian wine:

- Denominazione di origine (DO, rarely used; Italian: [denominatˈtsjoːne di oˈriːdʒine]; 'designation of origin');
- Indicazione geografica tipica (IGT; Italian: [indikatˈtsjoːne dʒeoˈɡraːfika ˈtiːpika]; 'indication of geographical typicality');
- Denominazione di origine controllata (DOC; Italian: [denominatˈtsjoːne di oˈriːdʒine kontrolˈlaːta]; 'controlled designation of origin'); and
- Denominazione di origine controllata e garantita (DOCG; Italian: [denominatˈtsjoːne di oˈriːdʒine kontrolˈlaːta e ɡɡaranˈtiːta]; 'controlled and guaranteed designation of origin').

The system was introduced in 1963 shortly after the Treaty of Rome established Italy as a founding member of the European Economic Community, and was modelled on the extant French appellation d'origine contrôlée (AOC) laws. It was overhauled in 1992 to match new European Union law on protected designation of origin, introducing the more general denominazione di origine protetta (DOP) designation for foods and agricultural products, including wines. Further EU reforms to harmonise agricultural policy in 2008 meant that designations used in member states, and thus Italian designations, were registered with the EU by the end of 2011, with subsequent new denominations or elevations approved by the EU.

== Indicazione geografica tipica (IGT) ==
Indicazione geografica tipica was created in 1992 to recognize the unusually high quality of the class of wines known as Super Tuscans, and to be broadly equivalent to the French vin de pays designation, official in Italy's Aosta Valley, where French is an official language. IGT wines are labelled with the locality of their creation, but do not meet the requirements of the stricter DOC or DOCG designations, which are generally intended to protect traditional wine formulations such as Chianti or Barolo. Since 2008 both IGT and vin de pays are equivalent to the EU protected geographical indication (PGI) designation, and many producers have switched to using the Italian translation, Indicazione geografica protetta (IGP). This classification is seen to be a higher quality wine than vino da tavola ('table wine').

== Denominazione di origine controllata (DOC) ==
The denominazione di origine controllata classification was created to be roughly equivalent to the French appellation d'origine contrôlée (AOC). It requires that a wine satisfy a defined quality standard and be produced within the specified region. Unlike IGT, the DOC definitions will usually specify additional more stringent rules regarding permitted grape varieties, harvest yields, minimum ageing including use of barrels, minimum alcohol content, and other factors. Wines labelled DOC or DOCG must be sold in bottles holding no more than 5 litres (170 US fl oz). Historically the DOC status has been used to classify other food products such as cheeses, olive oil and vinegar, but the denominazione di origine protetta (DOP) is now used instead.

Since the 2008 EU reforms, both the DOC and DOCG wine classifications are protected in the EU as protected designation of origin (PDO), which in Italy generally is indicated in Italian: denominazione di origine protetta (DOP). They may however still be referred to as DOC/DOCG, or in Bolzano, where German is an official language, kontrollierte Ursprungsbezeichnung, as well as in the Aosta Valley, where French is an official language, dénomination d'origine contrôlée.

== Denominazione di origine controllata e garantita (DOCG) ==
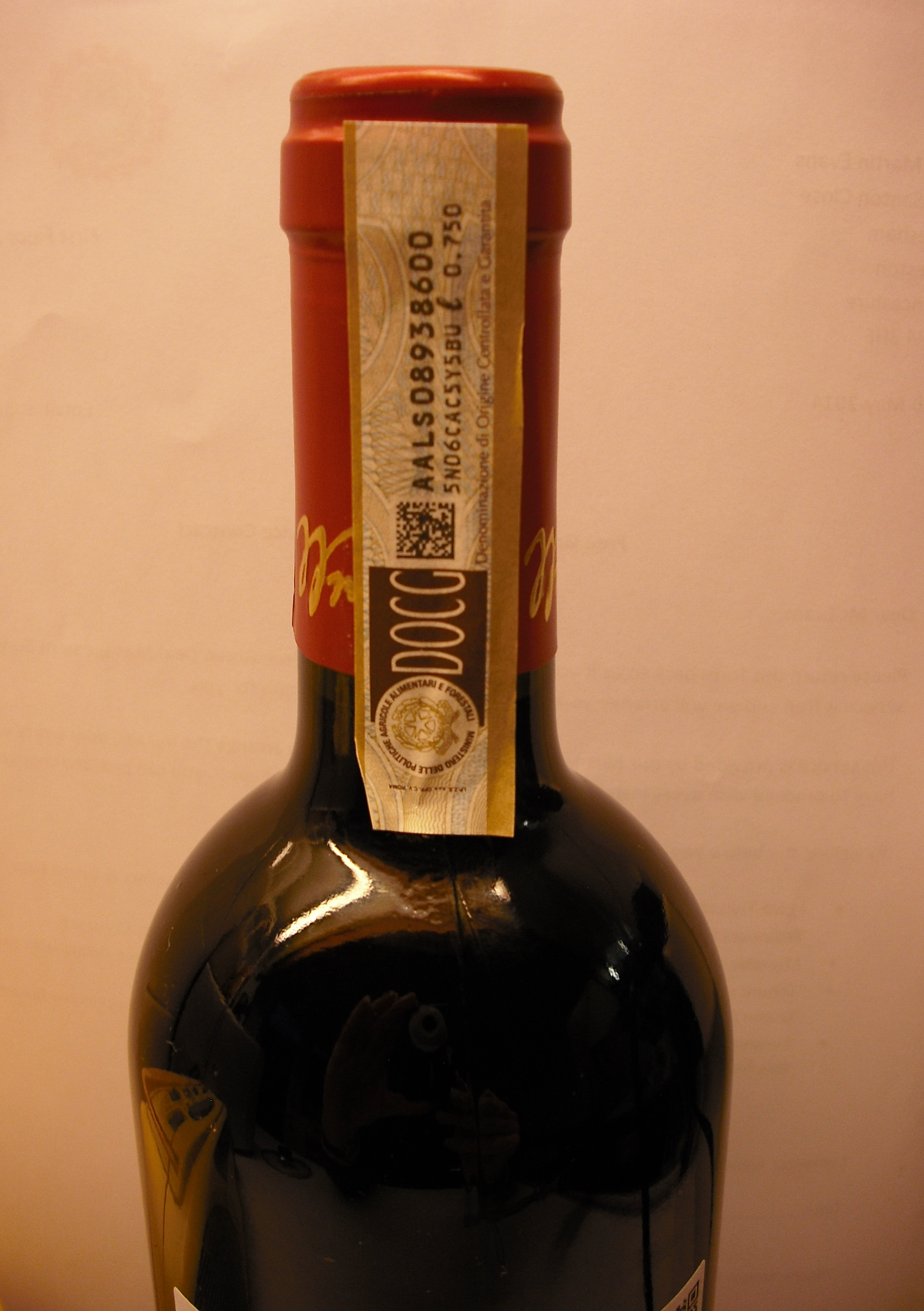
A paper strip denoting DOCG on a bottle of 2012 Barbera d'Asti

Denominazione di origine controllata e garantita is intended to be a superior classification to DOC, and is the highest classification in Italy. All DOCG wines from each producer are analysed and tasted by a government-licensed judgement panel before being bottled. Once approved, the wines are "guaranteed" with a numbered governmental seal across the cap or cork, to prevent later manipulation. Where the DOCG classification represents a refinement of an existing DOC wine, the rules for the DOCG wine usually require more stringent quality controls. These controls are usually some combination of a lower proportion of blending grapes, lower yields, higher minimum alcohol, longer ageing requirements, and so on.

The need for a DOCG identification arose when the DOC designation was, in the view of many Italian food industries, given too liberally to different products. A new, more restrictive identification was then created as similar as possible to the previous one so that buyers could still recognize it, but qualitatively different. The three original DOCGs were Brunello di Montalcino, Vino Nobile di Montepulciano, and Barolo, all approved by a presidential decree in July 1980, followed by Barbaresco three months later.

For wines produced in Bolzano, where German is an official language, DOCG may be written as Kontrollierte und garantierte Ursprungsbezeichnung.

For wines produced in the Aosta Valley, where French is an official language, DOCG may be written as Dénomination d'origine contrôlée et garantie.

In 2010–2011 many new DOCG classifications were created or elevated from DOC, in the rush to register them before the EU reform deadline. This has had the effect of potentially diluting the importance of the DOCG classification.

== Other label rules ==
Italian legislation additionally regulates the use of qualifying terms for wines. Classico ('classic') is reserved for wines produced in the region where a particular type of wine has been produced "traditionally". For Chianti Classico, this traditional region is defined by a 1932 decree. Riserva ('reserve') may be used only for wines that have been aged at least two years longer than normal for a particular type of wine.

== See also ==
- Geographical indications and traditional specialities in the European Union
- List of Italian DOCG wines
- List of Italian DOC wines
- List of Italian IGT wines
- List of Italian food and drink products with protected status
- Traditional food
