= Baratuciat =

Variety of grape

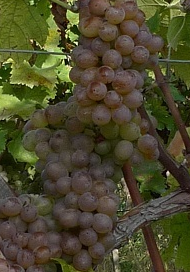
Baratuciat grapes hanging on the vine near harvest.

Baratuciat is a white Italian wine grape variety that is grown in the Piedmont wine region of northwest Italy. For most of its history, Baratuciat was used mainly as a table grape with some limited use for wine production with sweet late-harvest dessert wines. On 23 June 2008 the grape was officially added to the Italian registry of wine grape varieties.

In the Piedmontese language, the name Baratuciat is similar to the term used in the local dialect to denote cat's testicles, which ampelographers theorize may be a reference to the morphological shape of the grape's berries or to the characteristic "Sauvignon blanc-like" aromas of the grape, and wine made from it, which can be similar to a cat's litter box and elderflowers.

Today, Baratuciat is found almost exclusively in the province of Turin, particularly in the Susa Valley, where it is found in the villages of Almese, Buttigliera Alta, Rosta, Rubiana and Villar Dora.

== History ==
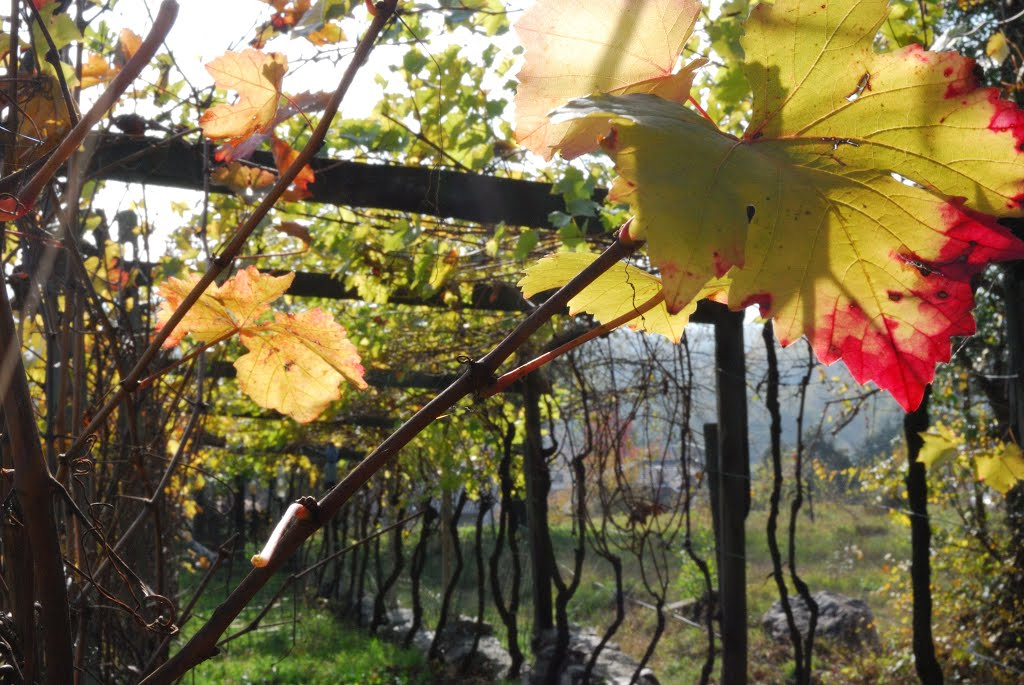
Baratuciat grapes growing in a pergola.

Unlike many Piemontese varieties, Baratuciat does not have a long history of wine production use in Piedmont with only written records in the twentieth and twenty-first century describing its use for both table grape and winemaking. Ampelographers believe that the name Baratuciat is derived from the term used in the local Piemontese dialect for the testicles of cats.

== Viticulture ==
Baratuciat is a mid-ripening grape variety that can be very vigorous and prone to producing a large canopy and high yields if not kept in check by winter pruning, green harvesting and canopy management techniques throughout the growing season. The grape tends to be a high acid variety that lends itself well to balancing the sugars in the production of sweet, late-harvest dessert wines.

Baratuciat berries tend to be small with very thick skins that are prone to infection by botrytis bunch rot. While for some grape varieties, such as Sauvignon blanc, Furmint and Sémillon, growing in some wine regions, such as Sauternes in Bordeaux and the Tokaj wine region of Hungary, the development of "noble rot" can be desirable in the production of dessert wines. But in the case of Baratuciat, the presence of Botrytis cinerea is usually considered a viticultural hazard.

== Wine regions ==
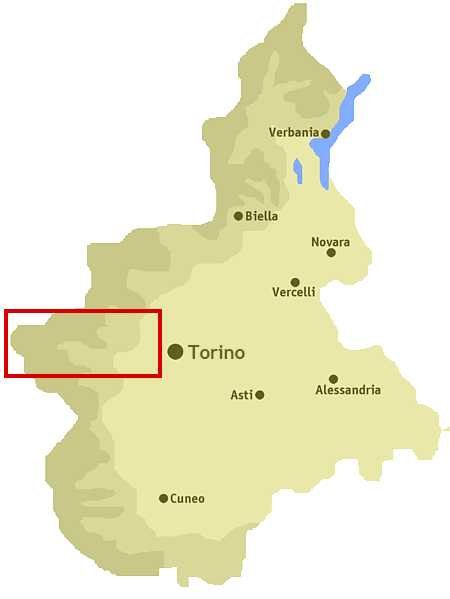
Location of the Susa Valley where Baratuciat is grown.

Baratuciat was only added to the official registry of Italian grape varieties in 2008 which means that plantings of the variety were not counted during the 2000 census. However, ampelographers believe that the grape is almost exclusively grown in the Susa Valley located within the province of Turin. The villages of Almese, Buttigliera Alta, Rosta, Rubiana and Villar Dora have the most significant plantings of Baratuciat with one winery in Almese cultivating the grape on a commercial scale since the early 21st century. Wine critics are watching the development of plantings of the variety within the (currently) red wine only Denominazione di origine controllata (DOC) of Valsusa, noting that the grape has "potential" in this region.

A 2011 study by the University of Adelaide in Australia, documented 2 hectares (4.9 acres) of the grape variety being cultivated in 2010 which ranked it as the 1124th most cultivated wine grape variety in the world.

== Styles ==
According to Master of Wine Jancis Robinson, Baratuciat tends to produce very "Sauvignon blanc-like" wines with high levels of acidity and characteristic elder flower and "cat box" aromas. Like many white Italian wine varieties, the grape can also have some slight bitter notes on the finish. Throughout most of its history, the grape was mainly used as an eating variety on the table with some limited use for late harvest wines.

== Synonyms ==
Over the years, Baratuciat has also been known by or with the synonyms of Bertauciat and Bertacuciàt.
