= Caprie =

Caprie Ciàvrie (Piedmontese) Ciàvrie (Arpitan)
- Comune
- Comune di Caprie
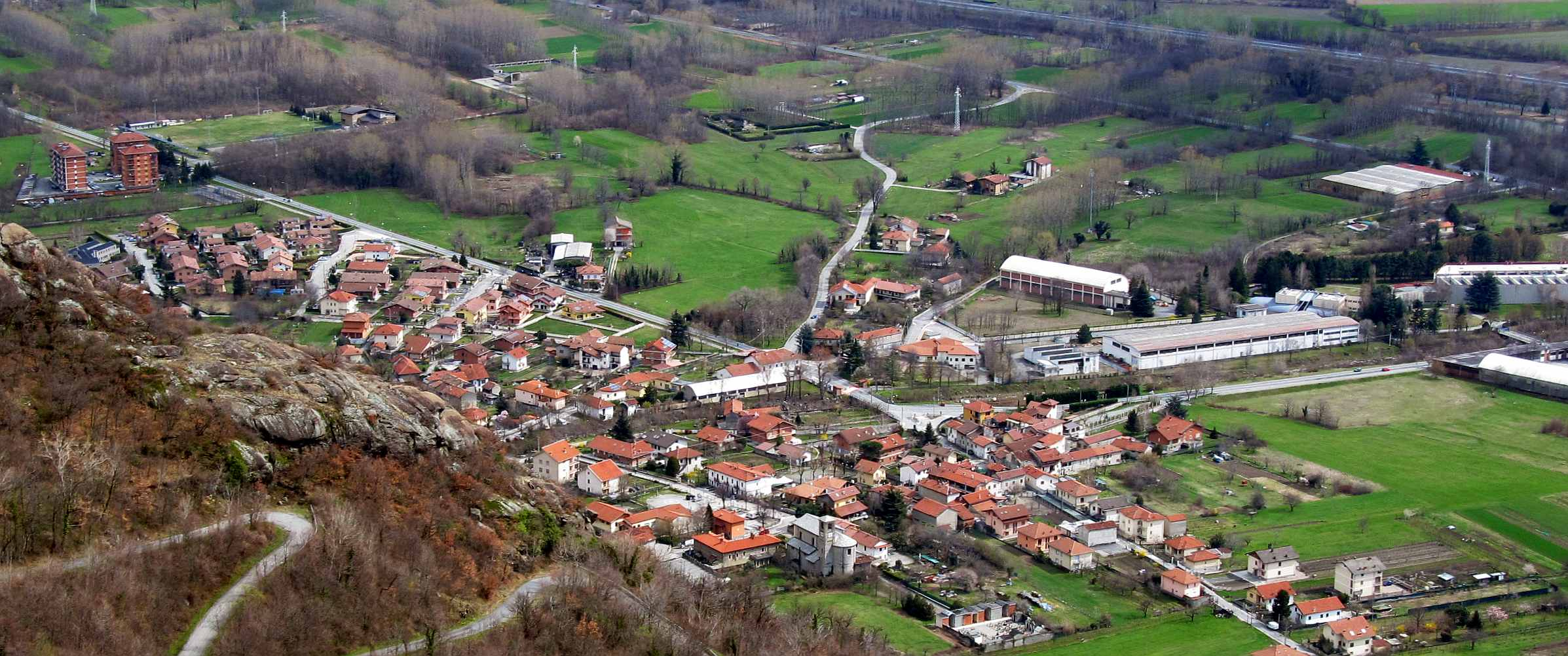

- Location within Italy Location within Piedmont
- Coordinates: 45°7′N 7°19′E
- Country: Italy
- Region: Piedmont
- Metropolitan city: Turin (TO)
- Frazioni: Celle, Novaretto, Campambiardo, Peroldrado

Government
  - Mayor: Gian Andrea Torasso

Area
  - Total: 16.41 km^{2} (6.34 sq mi)
- Elevation: 375 m (1,230 ft)

Population (1 January 2017)
  - Total: 2,091
  - Density: 127.4/km^{2} (330.0/sq mi)
- Demonym: Capriesi
- Time zone: UTC+1 (CET)
  - Summer (DST): UTC+2 (CEST)
- Postal code: 10040
- Dialing code: 011
- Website: Official website

Caprie (Piedmontese and Arpitan: Ciàvrie) is a comune (municipality) in the Metropolitan City of Turin in the Italian region Piedmont, about 35 kilometres (22 mi) west of Turin. Caprie borders the following municipalities: Condove, Rubiana, Villar Dora, Sant'Ambrogio di Torino, and Chiusa di San Michele.
