= Lombard locks =

- Chiuse longobarde
- Interactive map of Lombard locks
- 45°06′N 7°19′E
- Type: Linear fortification
- Periods: 7th century
- Location: Chiusa di San Michele, Piedmont, Itay

History
- Event: Charlemain's conquest of the Lombard kingdom

Site notes
- Condition: Exact location uncertain

The Lombard locks were fortification systems that were built at the mouth of valleys on the Italian side of the Alps in ancient times to prevent the invasion of the Po Valley by forces from the rest of Europe.

Inherited and consolidated by the Lombards, the Lombard locks were located at the mouth of the Susa valley in the region of the present-day municipality of Chiusa di San Michele.

The alpine locks (Latin: clusae langobardorum) were seldom stone walls; more usually they were sets of minor defensive structures which were arranged to reinforce existing natural obstacles.

They are famed for the victory of the Franks led by Charlemagne at the beginning of his Italian campaign against the Lombard king Desiderius in 773, which was recounted by Alessandro Manzoni in Adelchi (Act II, scene III). Charlemagne's army met the fortifications of Desiderius, but his scouting forces found an alternate route and attacked the defenders from the east. The route Charlemagne used is now a hiking trail known locally as the Path of the Franks. A plaque commemorating the event has been placed in the centre of Conte Verde castle in the village of Condove (Turin).

== Archeology ==
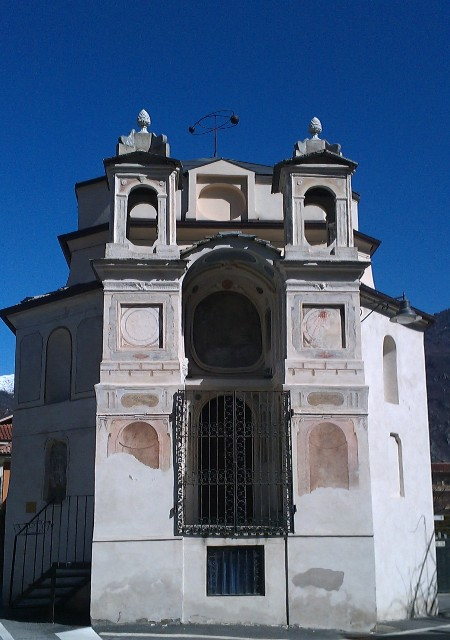
The deconsecrated chapel of St Joseph, now a planetarium, in Chiusa San Michele. On the lower floor are archaeological remains that are thought to be early medieval fortifications

The town of Chiusa di San Michele has always been identified as the site of the fortifications. The reason for this is the topography of the Susa Valley, which is at its narrowest point of its lower section, specifically along a south-north line running from the hamlet of Borgo Pracchio di Chiusa di San Michele on the south side of the valley, to the area of the Conte Verde Castle in the municipality of Condove on the north side.

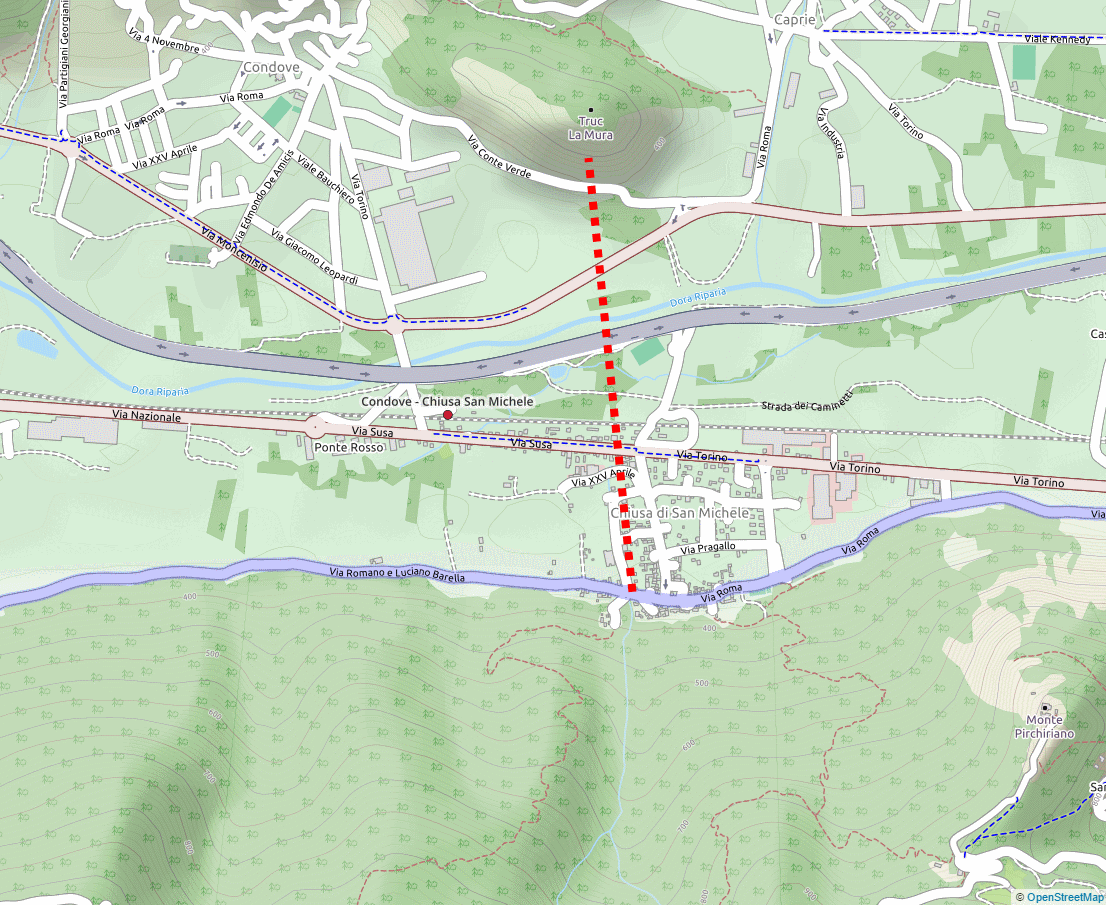
The natural bottleneck between Condove and Chiusa San Michele (Turin is to the east)

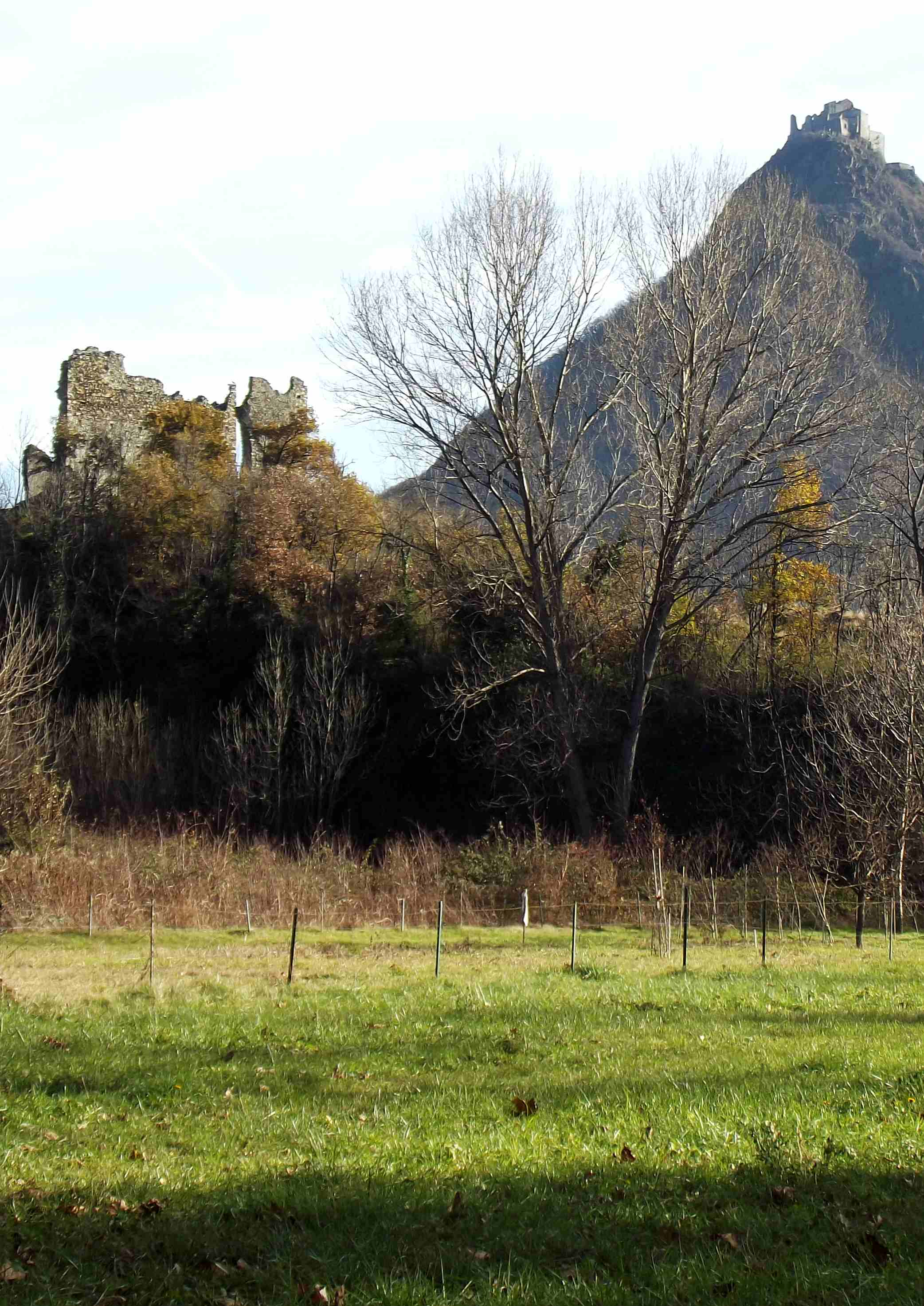
Conte Verde castle (Castrum Capriarum) near Condove (Turin Italy), with St Michael's Abbey on top of Mount Pirchiriano in the background

While some structures built along the Praocchio brook in Chiusa di San Michele have traditionally been regarded as Lombard, their origin is unclear. There is some evidence of fortification along this imaginary line, but near the central Piazza della Repubblica, has raised the doubts of archaeologists. In a room below a deconsecrated chapel, known as St. Joseph's, ancient walls have been found, of uncertain date, but which may hint at an early medieval fortification, possibly a tower with four corner turrets. It is a square room, with chamfered corners on the four corners suggesting small turrets two metres in diameter.
