= Rubiana =

Rubiana Rubiana (Arpitan) Rubian-a (Piedmontese)
- Comune
- Comune di Rubiana
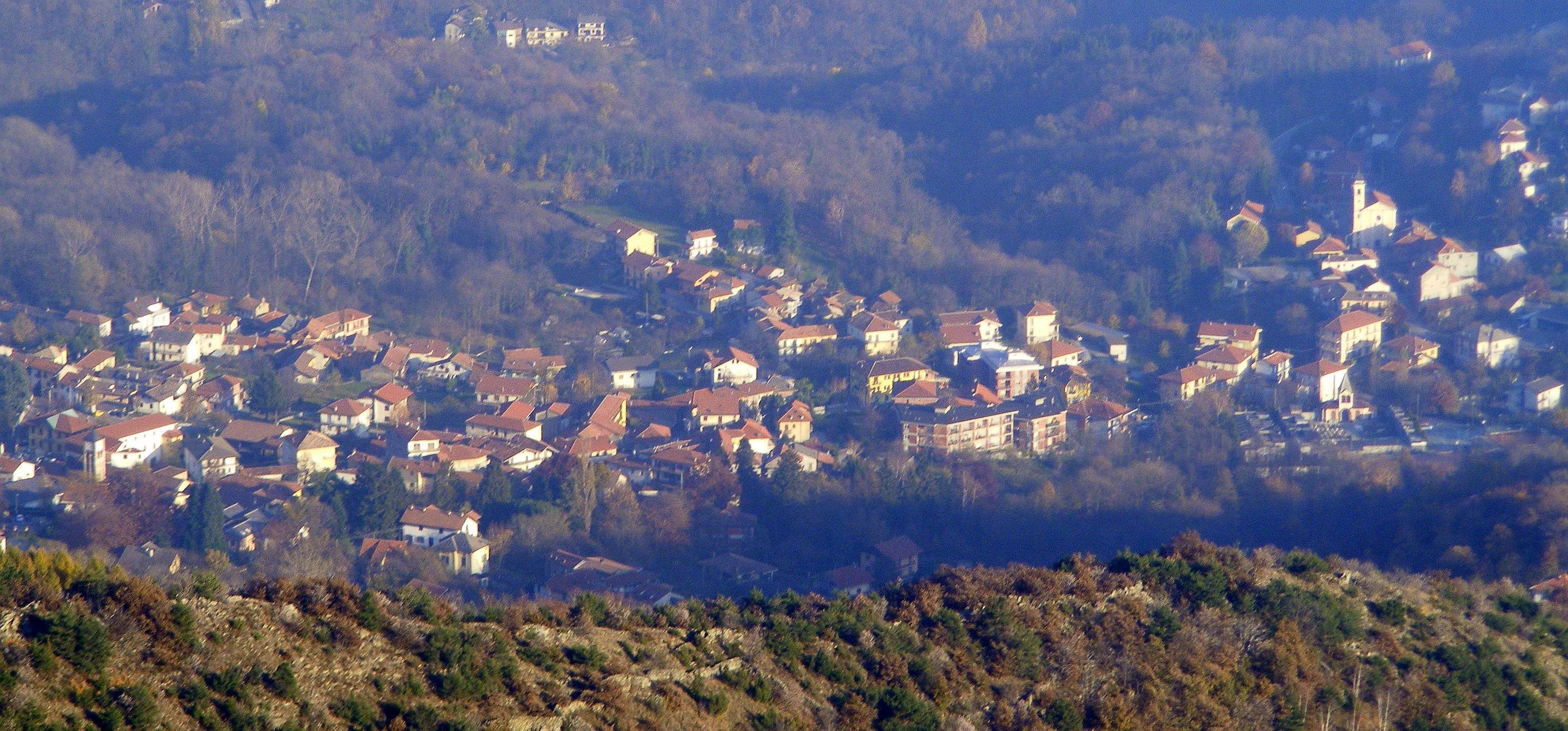

- Location within Italy Location within Piedmont
- Coordinates: 45°8′N 7°23′E
- Country: Italy
- Region: Piedmont
- Metropolitan city: Turin (TO)
- Frazioni: Mompellato, Favella

Government
  - Mayor: Gianluca Blandino

Area
  - Total: 26.8 km^{2} (10.3 sq mi)
- Elevation: 700 m (2,300 ft)

Population (31 December 2010)
  - Total: 2,399
  - Density: 89.5/km^{2} (232/sq mi)
- Demonym: Rubianesi
- Time zone: UTC+1 (CET)
  - Summer (DST): UTC+2 (CEST)
- Postal code: 10040
- Dialing code: 011
- Website: Official website

Rubiana (Arpitan: Rubiana, Piedmontese: Rubian-a) is a comune (municipality) in the Metropolitan City of Turin in the Italian region Piedmont, located about 25 kilometres (16 mi) northwest of Turin.

The municipality of Rubiana contains the frazioni (subdivisions, mainly villages and hamlets) Mompellato and Favella.

Rubiana borders the following municipalities: Viù, Condove, Val della Torre, Caprie, Villar Dora, and Almese.
