= Franco Fuschi =

Italian serial killer and self-confessed contract killer

- Born: 1945; Padua, Province of Padua, Italy
- Died: 25 April 2009 (aged 63–64); San Michele Prison, Alessandria, Province of Alessandria, Italy
- Convictions: Murder x11 Slander
- Penalty: Life imprisonment x2 plus 8 years imprisonment

Details
- Victims: 11–30+
- Span of crimes: 1977 – 1994 (confirmed)
- Country: Italy (confirmed); Pakistan, Japan and Egypt (confessed)
- State: Turin
- Date apprehended: 1995

Franco Fuschi (1945 – 25 April 2009) was an Italian serial killer, former soldier and self-proclaimed contract killer. He confessed to and was later convicted of eleven robbery-motivated killings in the Province of Turin from 1977 to 1994, and additionally claimed responsibility for other politically motivated killings in Italy and abroad, most of which remain uncorroborated.

For his confirmed crimes, Fuschi was sentenced to life imprisonment, which he served until his death in 2009.

== Early life ==
Born in Padua in 1945, Fuschi enlisted in the Italian Navy as a young man, and went on to serve in its special operations unit, the CONSUBIN, for nineteen years. At the end of his service, he moved to the Susa Valley in 1972, where he married Emilia Artesiano from Piedmont. In order to make a living, he worked as a farmer and did small jobs as an electrician in Mattie.

By the mid-1970s, Fuschi started stealing various items from isolated or abandoned cottages on the outskirts of Turin. Eventually, he would start killing witnesses to these thefts in order to prevent being caught.

== Murders ==
=== Initial murders ===
Fuschi's first confirmed murder occurred on 10 November 1977 – while he was observing a house in Piossasco that he intended to rob, he was accidentally spotted by the occupants, who immediately started screaming. In an attempt to scare them off, he fired a bullet at the house, but it ricocheted and hit the homeowner's sister, 37-year-old Maria Rosa Carpinello, who died on the spot.

Two years later, on 8 December 1979, Fuschi and unnamed accomplice were skulking around a farmhouse in rural Volpiano when they were spotted by 50-year-old farmer Antonio Ferrero Giacominetto. The man grabbed a pitchfork and attempted to confront the pair when they passed by his yard, but Giacominetto was shot in the chest by Fuschi, with the hit proving to be fatal.

When the farmer's body was found, the villagers assumed that he had died of a heart attack, as nobody at the time noticed the bullet hole. The sole person to consider the death suspicious was Giacominetto's sister, Maria, who had seen blood on her brother's body. However, her request for an autopsy was denied and he was then buried, with only rumors suggesting that something else had happened. The case was only reexamined following Fuschi's arrest nearly two decades later.

=== 1980s ===
On 11 February 1984, 48-year-old businessman Giacomo Lea, the owner of an shop selling agricultural machinery in Savona, was watching television with his wife and two daughters at their villa in Moncalieri when they were disturbed by their dog's constant barking. Insistent on checking out what's wrong, Lea went out on the porch to see what was going on, whereupon he was shot three times in the chest. His alarmed wife got a gun and returned fire at the assailant, but the mysterious figure ran away. Lea was then driven to a hospital, but later succumbed to his injuries. Initially, police suspected that Lea was the victim of a local robbery gang, but this theory was later ruled out.

On the evening of 12 June 1985, Fuschi stabbed to death 32-year-old Ivo Asteggiano, a native of Mondovì who lived in Chieri. A teacher at a middle school in Santena, Asteggiano was stabbed three times as he exited his home: his last words, addressed to his girlfriend who had come to open the door, were "they beat me up". An attempted robbery gone wrong was initially ruled out, since nothing had been stolen from Asteggiano's wallet.

On 27 May 1987, Fuschi was burning some brushwood near a corn field in None, an act that attracted the ire of 43-year-old Massimo Mantovani, a business mediator that lived in the area. After exchanging insults, he challenged the man to fight it out on the dirt road, which Mantovani accepted. However, when he approached, Fuschi grabbed his gun and shot him in the chest, before proceeding to shoot him in the head. This alerted Mantovani's wife, who managed to catch a glimpse of the killer before he slipped away into the darkness, describing him as a robust man in his fifties.

On 12 July of that same year, Fuschi was attempting to steal some items from a metal carpentry shed in Carmagnola when he was spotted by a man named Matteo Osella. Osella immediately notified his neighbor, 46-year-old craftsman Gabriele Racca, and the two men went to confront the thief. Upon seeing them, Fuschi fled towards a nearby corn field, with the two men chasing after him. Fuschi then pulled out his gun and shot at them, killing Racca and severely injuring Osella, who survived his injuries.

In the aftermath of this crime, news reports immediately suspected that the killer was the same man who committed a similar crime two years prior. On 12 October 1985, 56-year-old pensioner Giovanni Peiretti heard noises coming from his garden and stumbled across Fuschi, who was in the process of stealing two fishing rods and a battery-powered radio from Peiretti's neighbor. Peiretti attempted to confront him, but was instead shot to death by Fuschi, who fled into the night. The local carabinieri initially believed that the killer in that case might be a gypsy, so they combed through local encampments for potential suspects, but their search proved fruitless.

Many years later, Fuschi confessed to the Asteggiano murder, claiming that it had been "commissioned by the secret service." Asteggiano's father reported that a few days before his son's murder, Ivo had mentioned an attempt to bribe an important, but unspecified person. This lead was investigated, but also ruled out. Fuschi's explanation of a contract killing was not believed, and it was instead suggested that the murder was the result of a botched robbery. Besides Asteggiano's murder, Fuschi claimed the murders of Lea and Mantovani had been carried out on the orders of Mario Ferraro, a SISMI colonel who died by apparent suicide in 1995.

=== 1990s ===
Fuschi's latter murders became distinguished due to their apparent randomness and utter senselessness, with the first such act being the 24 November 1990 murder of 27-year-old Giorgio Sedita in Rivalta di Torino. On that night, Sedita was working at his father-in-law's factory, where he lived with his wife, Antonella. At some point, he heard somebody firing at a nearby halogen lamp, after which a frightened Sedita grabbed a Flobert gun he owned, intent on scaring off the shooter. However, as he confronted the man and loaded pellets into the gun, he was shot three times in the spleen and heart, dying on the spot. Due to the unusual nature of the murder, there was speculation that this was not a botched burglary, but an intentional murder carried out by either a madman or somebody who was doing something illegal and wanted to eliminate witnesses.

This was then followed up by the murder of 28-year-old Lorenzo Bertini, an employee at the Turin Airport living in Grosso Canavese. On 18 March 1991, while testing the silencer on his .22-caliber pistol, Fuschi alerted some dogs belonging to Bertini, who went to the balcony to check out what was going on. At that time, Fuschi fired a shot at the lamp, but instead struck Bertini in the chest, killing him instantly.

On 25 May 1992, Fuschi attempted to steal something from a house in Poirino, but was confronted by the homeowner, 27-year-old Stefano Francese. He attempted to run away, but the younger Francese caught up to him and started fighting with him. In the middle of the brawl, Fuschi managed to take out his gun and shoot the young man in the heart, killing him instantly.

His last confirmed victim was 37-year-old Nicola "The Coachbuilder" Lo Prete, a criminal with ties to the 'Ndrangheta who threatened to expose Fuschi for his involvement in an illegal arms trade deal involving Lo Prete's brother Giuseppe. In order to get rid of him, on 21 July 1994, Fuschi lured Nicola to an isolated location near Villar Dora, where he shot the man in the back of the head. The body was later found by a prostitute who serviced clients in the area. Initially, the carabinieri considered this to be a murder tied to the 'Ndrangheta, as their Turin branch had recently began having disputes over who should take over operations in the area.

=== Arrest and confessions ===
In 1995, Fuschi was arrested for his involvement in the illegal arms trade deal. While detained at the Prosecutor's Office in Turin, he alleged that he worked for SISDE and began to tell of his supposed dealings with Ferraro and the hundreds of weapons he had trafficked. In January 1996, completely spontaneously, he started confessing to various murders committed across Turin, at least eleven of which were found to be credible.

The remainder of his claims, however, were treated with skepticism. In total, Fuschi claimed to be responsible for more than 30 murders, including some committed in countries where he worked as a diver – these alleged killings occurred in Karachi, Pakistan; Tokyo, Japan and Port Said, Egypt. In regards to his supposed exploits in Italy, he claimed to be the assassin of banker Roberto Calvi; to have participated in the Piazza Fontana bombing and to have carried explosives used in the Gioia Tauro Massacre and the Italicus Express bombing. He also claimed to be responsible for several bombings committed along the Turin-Lyon line.

On 19 April 1996, after naming Mario Ferraro as the instigator for the murders, he locked himself in a bathroom at the Turin Prosecutor's Office and attempted to shoot himself in the head. The bullet passed through his head from side to side, but did not kill him, and Fuschi miraculously survived.

== Trial, imprisonment and death ==
Fuschi's trial began in November 1998. All journalists and investigators involved in the case received intimidating letters and death threats, in which they were threatened to end up like the victims. The judges disregarded Fuschi's elaborate claims about participating in the various terrorist bombings, and instead charged him with slandering both himself and the secret services. In 1999, Fuschi was convicted of eleven murders and sentenced to two life terms, as well as an additional eight years imprisonment for the slander charges. The sentence was upheld on appeal in January 2000.

During his incarceration, Fuschi studied gardening, and enjoyed reading books from Leonardo Sciascia, as well as some unnamed writers from South America.

On the night of 24–25 April 2009, Fuschi was found dead at the San Michele Prison in Alessandria. Given his multiple health problems, including a severe form of epilepsy and the recent removal of a stomach tumor, it was suggested that his death was the result of a heart attack. Another possible hypothesis suggested that he committed suicide. Curiously, days prior to his death, Fuschi had asked to be transferred to another prison, but did not have time to explain the reasons why to his lawyer Savino Bracco. To date, the exact cause of death has not been ascertained.

== List of victims ==
Date of attack	Identity	Age	Location
10 November 1977	Maria Rosa Carpinello	37	Piossasco
8 December 1979	Antonio Ferraro Giacominetto	50	Volpiano
11 February 1984	Giacomo Lea	48	Moncalieri
12 June 1985	Ivo Asteggiano	32	Chieri
12 October 1985	Giovanni Peiretti	56	Carmagnola
27 May 1987	Massimo Mantovani	43	None, Piedmont
12 July 1987	Gabriele Racca	46	Carmagnola
24 November 1990	Giorgio Sedita	27	Rivalta di Torino
18 March 1991	Lorenzo Bertini	28	Grosso Canavese
25 May 1992	Stefano Francese	26	Poirino
21 July 1994	Nicola Lo Prete	37	Villar Dora

== See also ==
- List of serial killers by country
