= Mocchie =

- Frazione
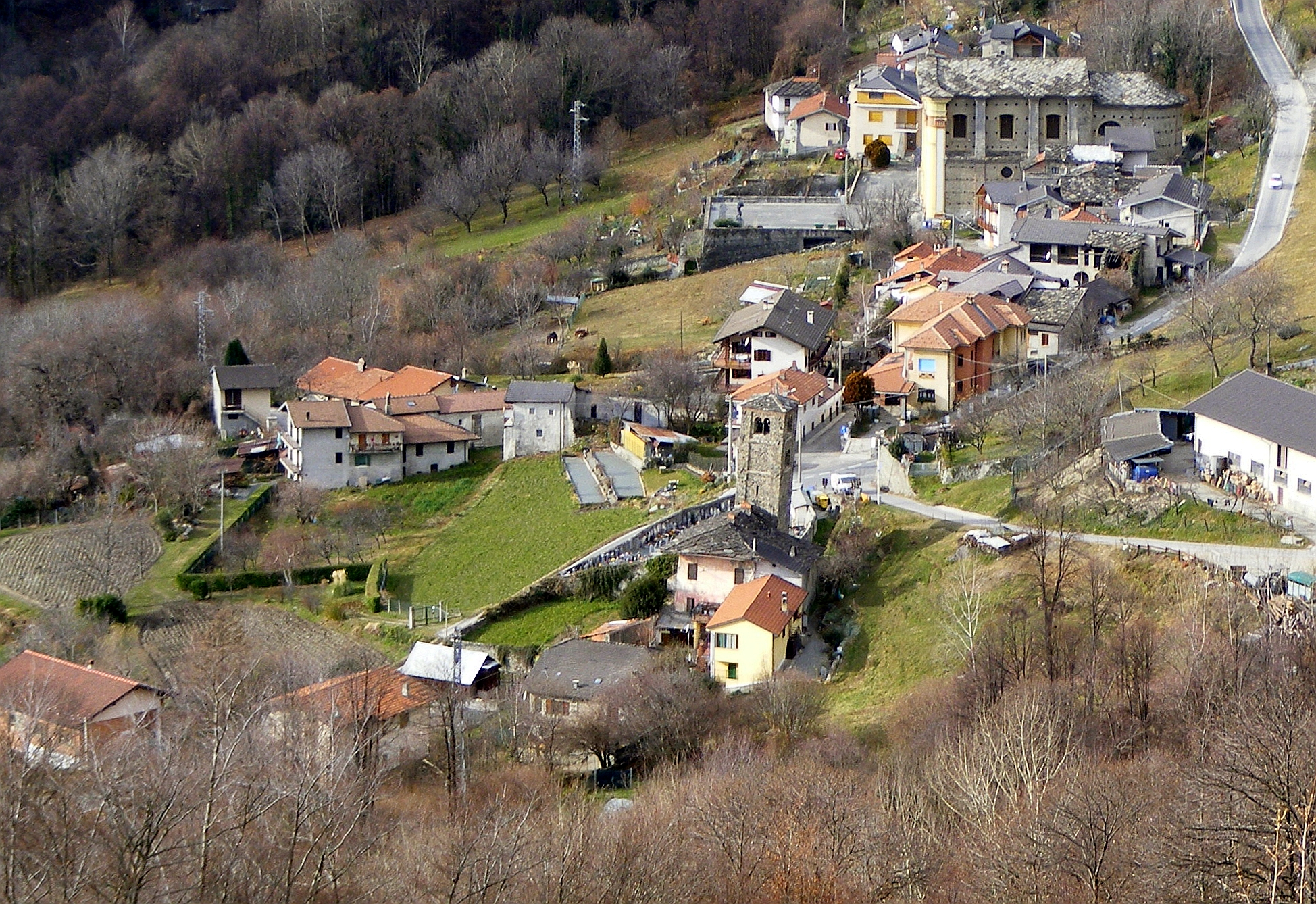
- Panoramic view

- Location of Mocchie in Italy
- Coordinates: 45°08′10″N 7°17′31″E
- Country: Italy
- Region: Piedmont
- Province: Turin (TO)
- Comune: Condove
- Elevation: 792 m (2,598 ft)
- Time zone: UTC+1 (CET)
  - Summer (DST): UTC+2 (CEST)
- Postal code: 10055
- Dialing code: (+39) 011

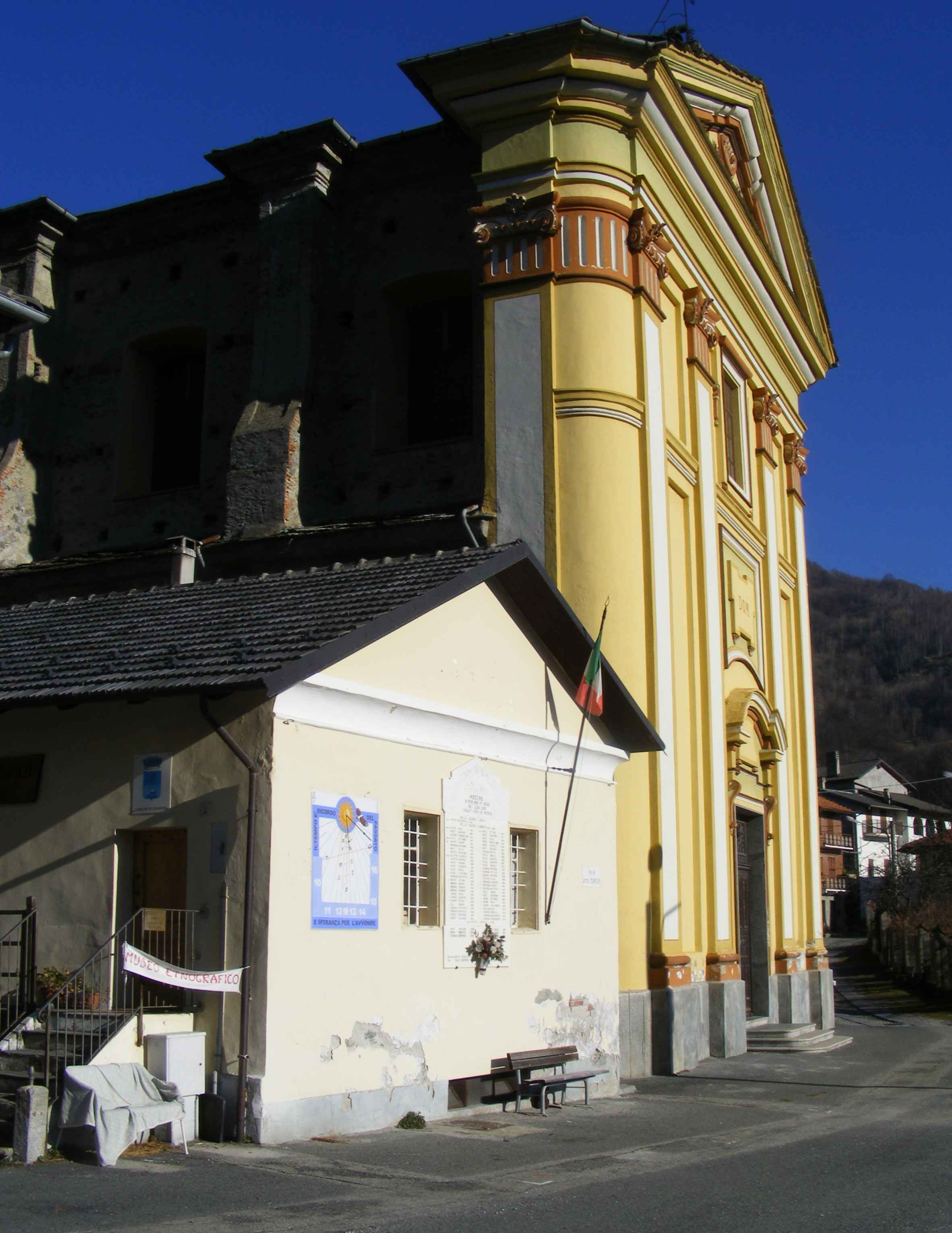
Saint Saturnino's parish church

Mocchie is a frazione of Condove, in Piedmont, northern Italy.

It is a mountain borough located several km north-west from the centre of Condove, along the provincial road nr. 200 leading to Frassinere.

Since July the 8th 1936 Mocchie was a separate comune (municipality), which also encompassed several small villages as Bonaudi, Bellafughera, Castellazzo, Pralesio and Moni.
