= Frassinere =

- Frazione
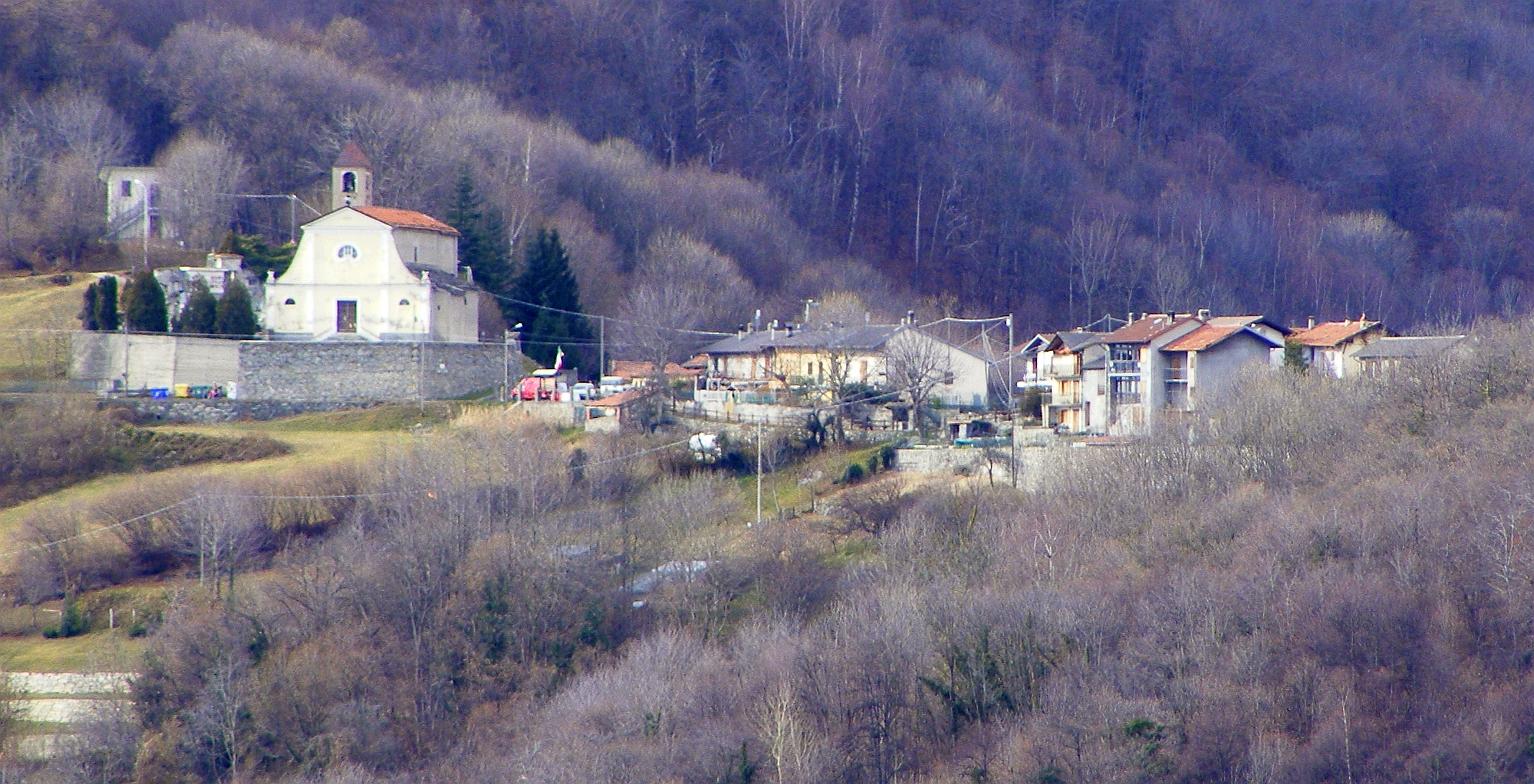
- Panoramic view

- Location of Frassinere in Italy
- Coordinates: 45°07′57″N 7°16′37″E
- Country: Italy
- Region: Piedmont
- Province: Turin (TO)
- Comune: Condove
- Elevation: 984 m (3,228 ft)
- Time zone: UTC+1 (CET)
  - Summer (DST): UTC+2 (CEST)
- Postal code: 10055
- Dialing code: (+39) 011

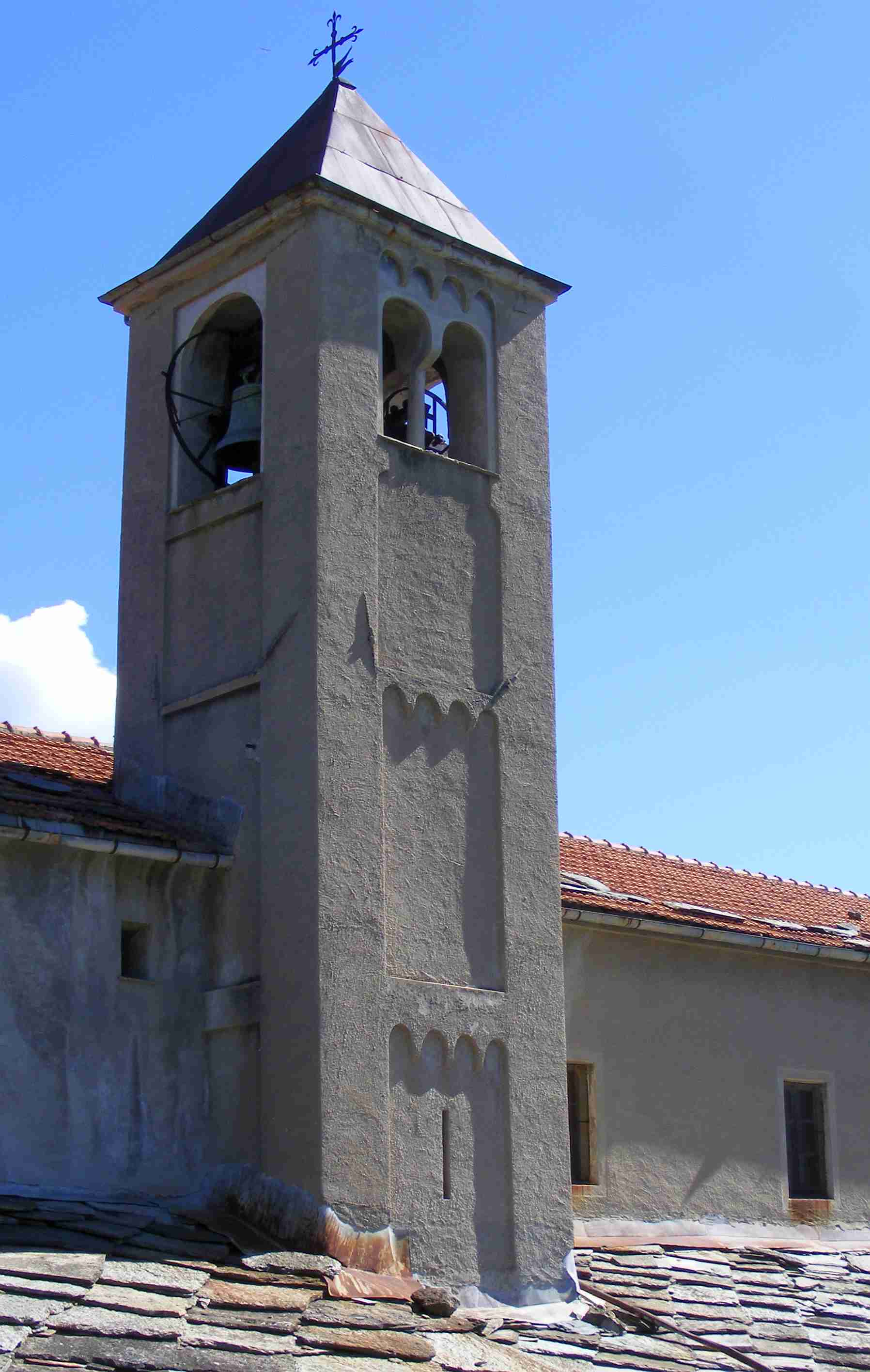
The Roman church tower of Saint Stephan's parish church

Frassinere is a frazione of Condove, in Piedmont, northern Italy.

It is a mountain borough located several km north-west from the centre of Condove, at the end of the provincial road nr. 200 starting from Condove and passing through to Mocchie.

Since 8 July 1936 Mocchie was a separate comune (municipality), which also encompassed several small villages as Alotti, Sinati, Molette, Reno, Mogliassi, Bar and Maffiotto.
