= Villar Dora =

Villar Dora Vilà (Arpitan)
- Comune
- Comune di Villar Dora
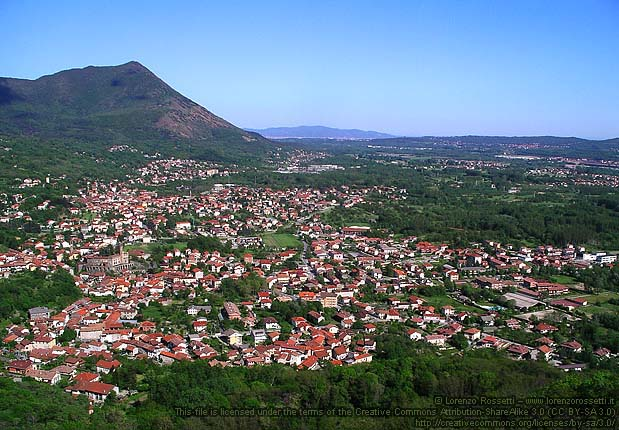
- View of Villar Dora

- Location within Italy Location within Piedmont
- Coordinates: 45°7′N 7°23′E
- Country: Italy
- Region: Piedmont
- Metropolitan city: Turin (TO)
- Frazioni: Andruini, Baratta, Bert, Borgionera, Bosio, Calliero, Cordonatto, Giorda, Merlo, Montecomposto, Richetto, Torre del colle, Vindrola

Government
  - Mayor: Mauro Carena

Area
  - Total: 5.6 km^{2} (2.2 sq mi)
- Elevation: 367 m (1,204 ft)

Population (9 October 2011)
  - Total: 2,951
  - Density: 530/km^{2} (1,400/sq mi)
- Demonym: Villardoresi
- Time zone: UTC+1 (CET)
  - Summer (DST): UTC+2 (CEST)
- Postal code: 10040
- Dialing code: 011
- Patron saint: Saints Vincent and Anastasius, Saint Roch
- Saint day: 22 January, 16 August
- Website: Official website

Villar Dora (Arpitan: Vilà) is a comune (municipality) in the Metropolitan City of Turin in the Italian region Piedmont, located about 25 km (16 mi) west of Turin.

Villar Dora borders the following municipalities: Rubiana, Caprie, Almese, Sant'Ambrogio di Torino, and Avigliana.

== Twin towns and sister cities ==
Villar Dora is twinned with:

- Lanslebourg-Mont-Cenis, France
