= Almese =

Almese Almèis (Piedmontese) Almèis (Arpitan)
- Comune
- Comune di Almese
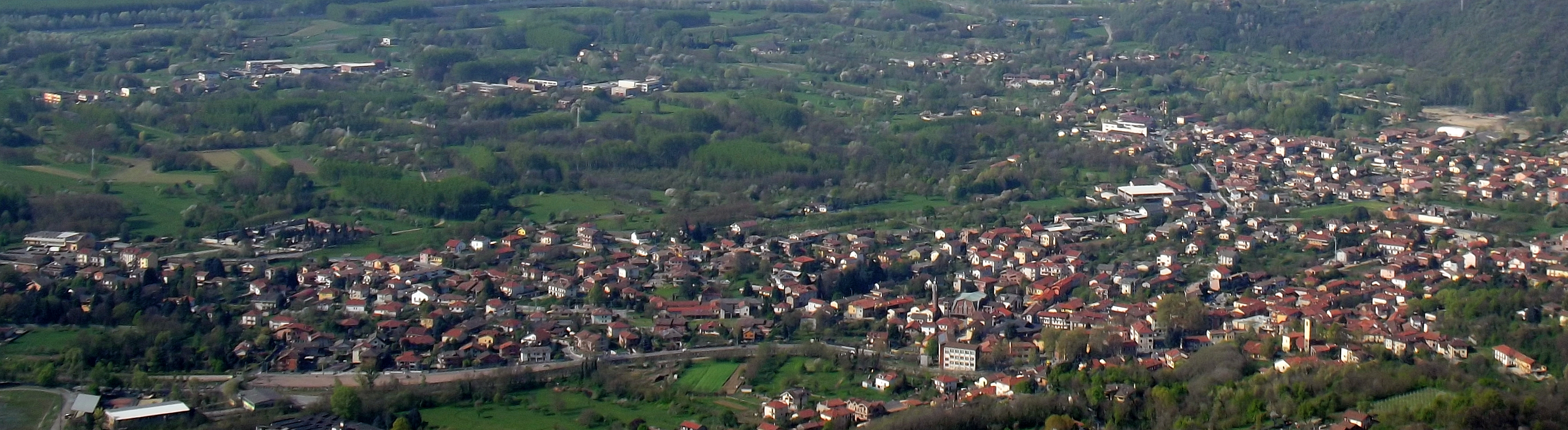
- View of Almese

- Coat of arms

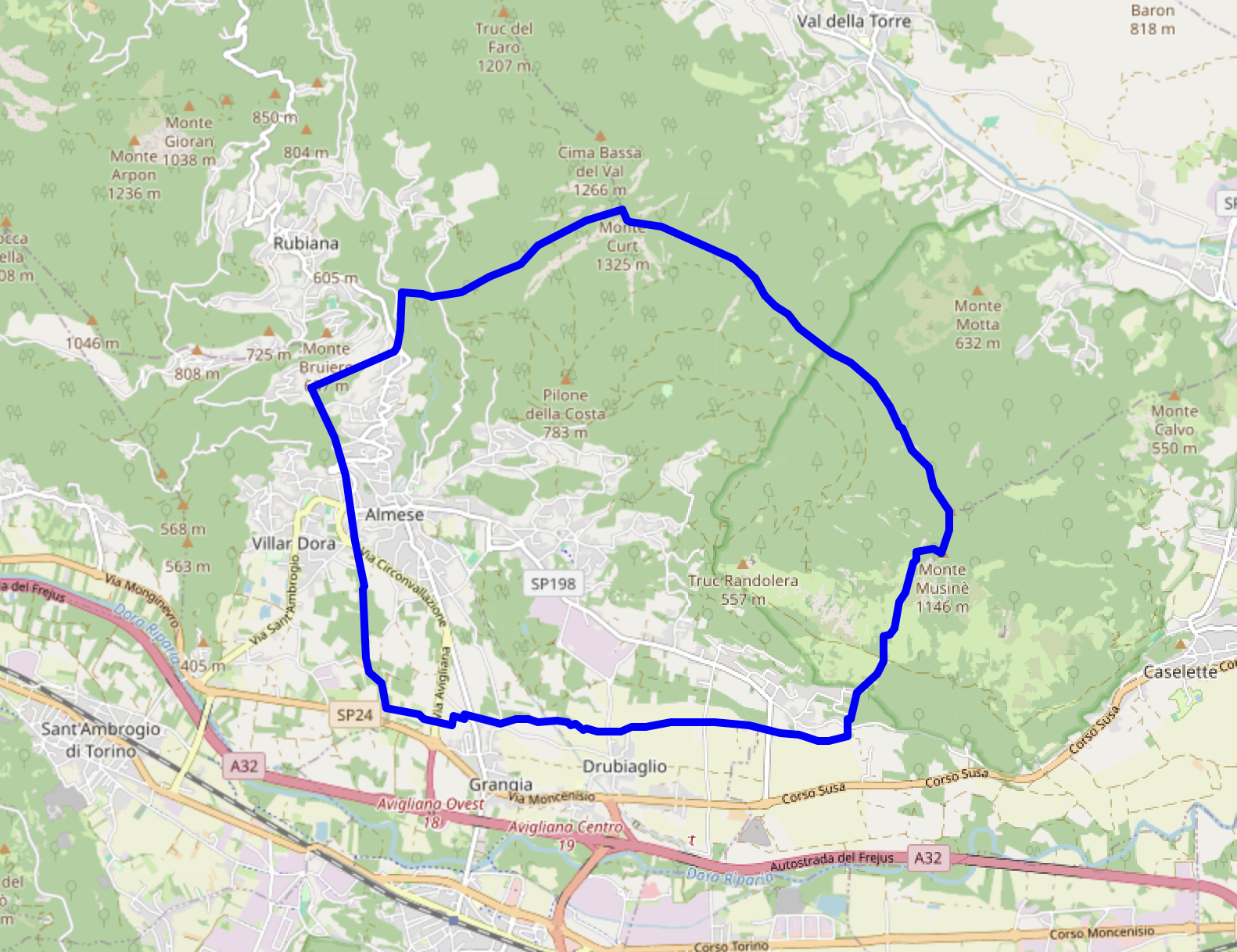

- Location of Almese in Italy Almese (Piedmont)
- Coordinates: 45°7′N 7°24′E
- Country: Italy
- Region: Piedmont
- Metropolitan city: Turin (TO)
- Frazioni: Malatrait, Milanere, Rivera

Government
  - Mayor: Ombretta Bertolo

Area
  - Total: 17.88 km^{2} (6.90 sq mi)
- Elevation: 364 m (1,194 ft)

Population (1 January 2017)
  - Total: 6,423
  - Density: 359.2/km^{2} (930.4/sq mi)
- Demonym: Almesino(i)
- Time zone: UTC+1 (CET)
  - Summer (DST): UTC+2 (CEST)
- Postal code: 10040
- Dialing code: 011
- Patron saint: Name of Mary
- Saint day: 12 September
- Website: Official website

Almese (Piedmontese and Arpitan: Almèis) is a comune (municipality) in the Metropolitan City of Turin in the Italian region Piedmont, located in the lower Val di Susa, about 27 kilometres (17 mi) west of Turin.

== Twin towns – sister cities ==
Almese is twinned with:

- Szczyrk, Poland
