= Condove =

Condove Condòve (Piedmontese) Kundòve (Arpitan)
- Comune
- Comune di Condove
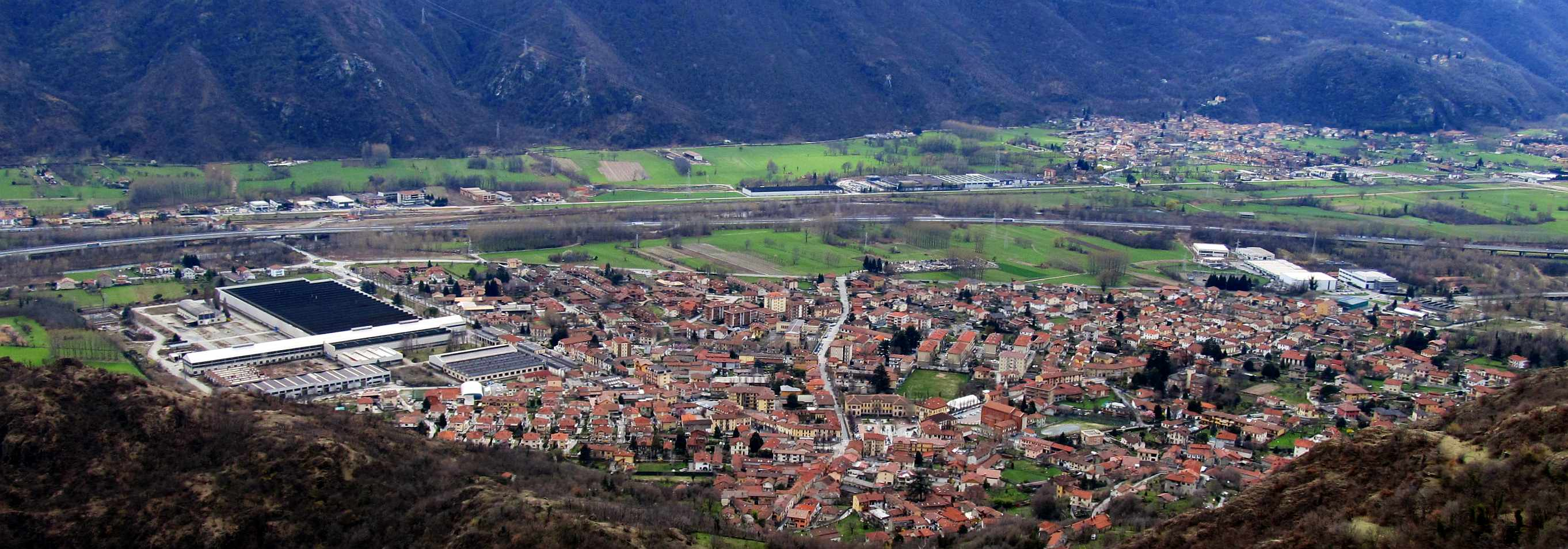
- Panorama from truc del Serro

- Location within Italy Location within Piedmont
- Coordinates: 45°7′N 7°19′E
- Country: Italy
- Region: Piedmont
- Metropolitan city: Turin (TO)
- Frazioni: Airassa, Alotti, Arronco, Audani, Bellafugera, Bertolere, Bigliasco, Boina, Bonaudi, Borla, Borlera, Braide, Breri, Calcina, Campo dell'Alpe, Camporossetto, Cascina, Castellazzo, Chiambeiretto, Chiampasso, Chiandone, Coletto, Colombatti, Combe, Cordole, Crosatto, Cugno, Dravugna, Fornacchia, Frassinere, Gagnor, Garneri, Gazzina Inferiore, Gazzina Superiore, Gerbi, Giagli, Girardi, Grange, Grangetta, Grattasole, Laietto, Liaj, Listelli, Maffiotto, Magnoletto, Magnotti, Miloro, Mocchie, Mogliassi, Molere, Mollette, Muni, Oliva, Poisatto, Pralesio Inferiore, Pralesio Superiore, Prarotto, Pratobotrile, Prato del Rio, Ravoire, Reno Inferiore, Reno Superiore, Rocca, Rosseno, Sigliodo Inferiore, Sigliodo Superiore, Sinati, Sinette, Trait, Tugno, Vagera, Vayr, Vianaudo, Vigne, Villa, Ville, Volpi

Government
  - Mayor: Emanuela Sarti

Area
  - Total: 71.3 km^{2} (27.5 sq mi)
- Elevation: 376 m (1,234 ft)

Population (30 November 2017)
  - Total: 4,622
  - Density: 64.8/km^{2} (168/sq mi)
- Demonym: Condovesi
- Time zone: UTC+1 (CET)
  - Summer (DST): UTC+2 (CEST)
- Postal code: 10055
- Dialing code: 011
- Website: Official website

Condove (Piedmontese: Condòve, Arpitan: Kundòve) is a comune (municipality) in the Metropolitan City of Turin, in the Piedmont region of northwestern Italian. It is located in the Val di Susa, approximately 30 kilometres (19 mi) west of Turin.
