= Pecorino (grape) =

Variety of grape

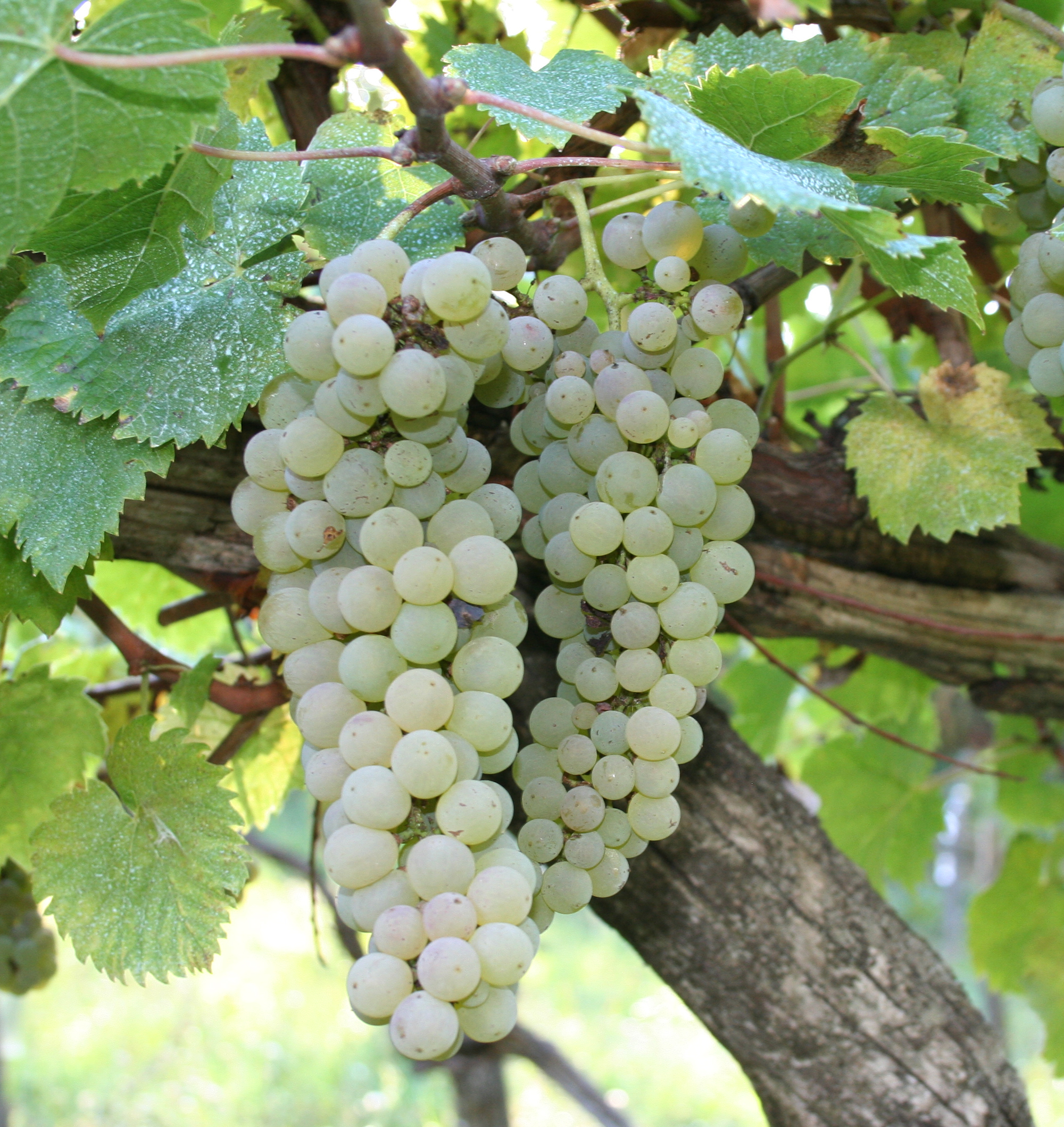
Pecorino of Arquata del Tronto

Pecorino is a white Italian wine grape variety that grows in the Marche, Abruzzo, Tuscany, Umbria and Lazio regions of Italy. Ampelographers believe that the grape is likely native to Marche, where the soil destined for this cultivation increases every year. This grape variety is used to produce the DOCG (denominazione di origine controllata e garantita) wines, like the Offida Pecorino DOCG, and the DOC (denominazione di origine controllata) wines, like the Falerio dei Colli Ascolani, the Colli Maceratesi and the Falerio dei Colli Ascolani.

Today, more than 20 qualities of wine are derived from this grape.

== History ==
Native of Arquata del Tronto in the Ascoli Piceno province in the Marche. Ampelographers believe that Pecorino is a very old variety that, originated by Benedictine monks cross as a wild grapevine growing in Arquata del Tronto that was eventually domesticated for wine production. The name is direct link between the Pecorino grape and pecorino cheese. Ampelographers believe that the grape's name derives from the Italian word pecorino.

Starting in the late 19th century, Count Gallo, the leading local winemaker, began to associate the term Pecorino with Verdicchio Bastardo Bianco di Arquata, both to distinguish it from the Verdicchio of the same name and because the term Bastardo was considered a negative term at the time.

In 1903, the agronomist Salvatore Mondini published "Foreign Wine Grape Varieties Cultivated in Italy," a leading technical text of the time. In this volume, Mondini describes a well-established viticultural tradition in the province of Ascoli Piceno, and specifically in the Arquata del Tronto area, comparing Pecorino to Riesling.

In the Province of Ascoli Piceno, according to information kindly provided by the local agricultural department, a grape variety called Pecorino has been cultivated for a very long time in the mountains of Arquata. It is a Riesling, and produces an abundant and regarded product.

Rhine Riesling wines in the province of Ascoli Piceno are excellent, and with a little aging, they can become refined. Commendatore Tranquilli also noted that Riesling grapes can be successfully blended with red wines, resulting in a product with a spicy and lively character, well-received by consumers who appreciate these qualities.

In the province of Perugia, Riesling was introduced with the aim of improving the production of local white wines. Grafting Riesling onto several low-yielding vines, the graft took very well, immediately producing vigorous shoots, bearing a few small bunches from the very first year.

In the ancient times, Romans considered central Italy as very important for wine production, especially processed from this grape. This cultivation is widely documented from the second part of the 19th century. In the documented history, in the year 1526 anyone who damaged the vineyards of the Pecorino grape in the territory of Arquata del Tronto had to pay a fine of 10 coins, according to the government local laws called the Statuti di Norcia (Umbria region).

In 1876, the Ministry of Agriculture, Industry and Commerce published an exhaustive list of variety of the grapes growing on the Italian soil; the list identified the areas of Pesaro, Ancona, Macerata and Teramo as the specific areas where mostly Pecorino grape was being grown.

== Viticulture ==
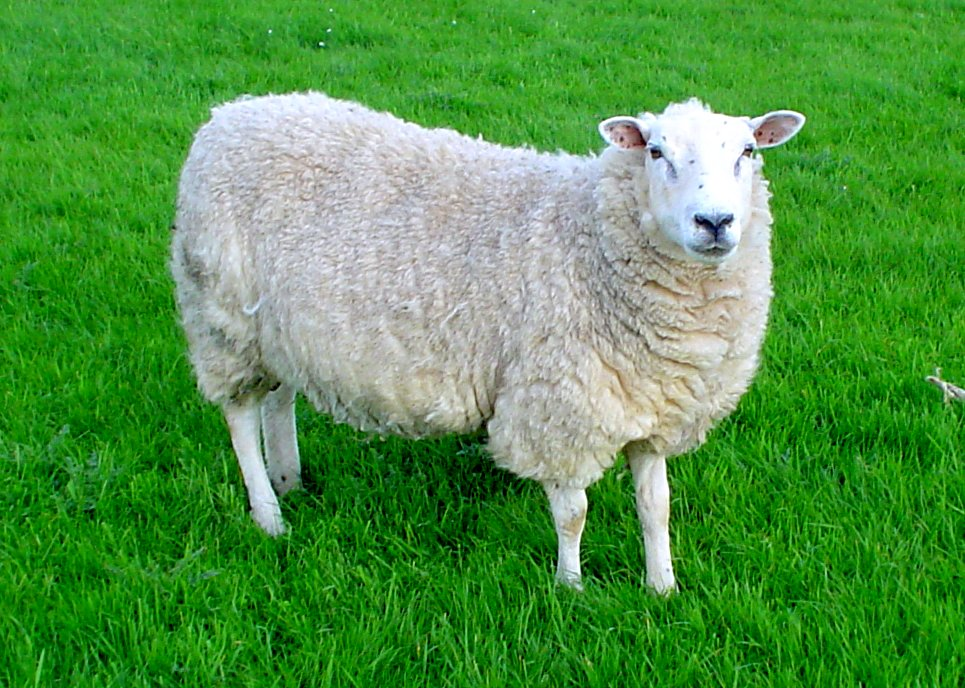
According to local legend, pecorino gets its name because sheep (pecora) are known to eat the grapes.

Pecorino is an early ripening variety that tends to naturally produce low yields even without severe winter pruning. The variety does not have many viticultural hazards with a strong resistance to downy and powdery mildew.

== Wine regions ==
In 2000 there were 87 hectares (210 acres) of Pecorino planted in Italy, mostly in the Arquata del Tronto region of the province of Ascoli Piceno, in Marche. In the 1980s, Guido Cocci Grifoni was the first producer to begin widely using Pecorino in his Offida DOC wines and introduced the variety to nearby Ripatransone. Today it is still a permitted variety in the Marche DOC wines of Falerio dei Colli Ascolani, Colli Maceratesi and Offida.

The "baptism" of Pecorino d'Abruzzo took place in 1997, when Luigi Cataldi Madonna inserted the grape variety's name on the label for the first time, with an initial production of about 2,000 bottles from a vineyard covering 8,000 square meters. This act had a decisive impact on the recognition and spread of Pecorino, significantly contributing to its rediscovery and enhancement within the regional wine context. Regarding this choice, Cataldi Madonna stated: "Nomina sunt numina - giving a name means giving it an identity".

Within a few years, the grape variety experienced significant growth. According to updated data, there are approximately 1,260 hectares of Pecorino vineyards in Abruzzo, producing annually 218,560 quintals of grapes and over 18 million bottles. The widespread cultivation highlights how Abruzzo has become the chosen territory for this grape, now considered one of the most interesting white grape varieties in central Italy.

In addition to be grown in Marche, plantings of Pecorino can also be found in the provinces of Chieti, Pescara and Teramo, where it is used in the sparkling wines of Controguerra and in several indicazione geografica tipica (IGT) wines of the region. Plantings can also be found in Liguria, Lazio, Tuscany and Umbria.

=== DOC regulations ===
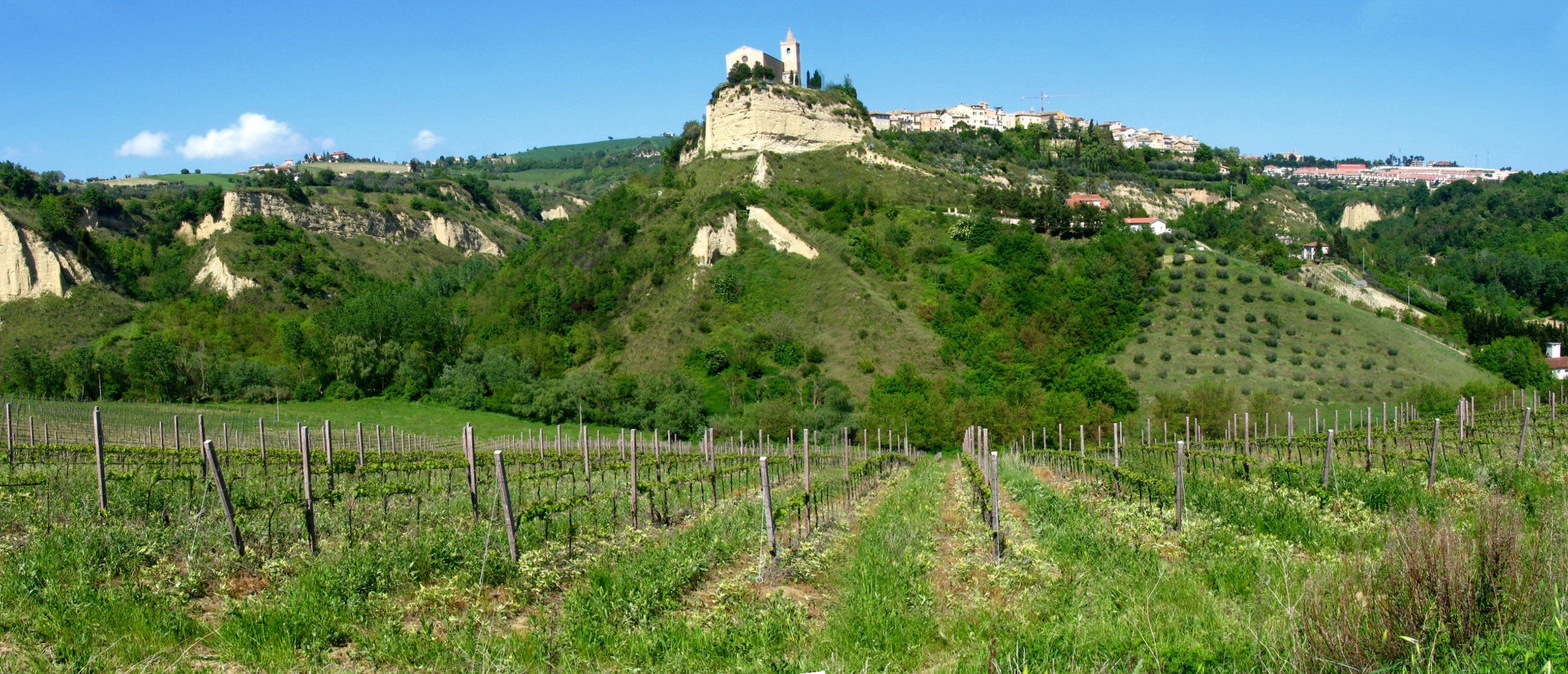
The Offida DOC, where Pecorino can be made as a varietal wine

In the commune of Macerata in the Marche, Pecorino can be included in the Maceratino-based white wines of the Colli Maceratesi DOC provided that it doesn't collectively exceed more than 30% of the blend along with Trebbiano, Verdicchio, Malvasia, Chardonnay, Sauvignon blanc, Grechetto and Incrocio Bruni 54. The wine can be made in a still, sparkling spumante or as passito dessert wine. Any Pecorino destined for DOC wines must be harvested at a yield no greater than 15 tonnes/hectare with the finished wine in all styles needing to attain a minimum alcohol level of at least 11%.

In Controguerra, up to 30% of Pecorino in combination with Verdicchio and Chardonnay can be used in the Trebbiano-based sparkling wines of the DOC. Grapes are limited to a harvest yield of no more than 14 tonnes/hectare with the finished wine needing a minimum alcohol level of 11%.

Within the Falerio dei Colli Ascolani DOC, up to 25% Pecorino can be used along with Pinot blanc, Passerina, Verdicchio and Malvasia (itself limited to no more than 7%) in the Trebbiano-based wines of the region. Grapes in this white-wine only Marche DOC are limited a maximum yield of 14 tonnes/ha with the a minimum alcohol level for the finished wine of at least 11.5%.

Offida DOCG In Offida, Pecorino can be made as a varietal provided it makes up at least 85% of the blend with other local, non-aromatic grapes permitted to fill in the remainder. Here grapes are limited to a yield of 10 tonnes/ha with the finished wines have an alcohol level of at least 12%. However, unlike Passerina which is also grown in the DOCG, Pecorino is not currently permitted to be used in the DOC's Vin Santo style wine.

== Synonyms and confusion with other grapes ==
Over the years Pecorino has been known under a variety of synonyms, including: Arquitano, Biancuccia, Bifolchetto, Bifolco, Bifolvo, Dolcipappola, Dolcipappolo, Forcese, Forconese, Iuvino, Juvino, Lanzesa, Moscianello, Mosciolo, Mostarello, Norcino, Pecorella, Pecorello, Pecorello di Rogliano, Pecori, Pecorina, Pecorina Aquitanella, Pecorina Arquatanella, Pecorino Bianco, Pecorino de Arquata, Pecorino di Arquata, Pecorino di Osimo, Piscianello, Piscianino, Promotico, Sgranarella, Stricarella, Striccarella, Trebbiano Viccio, Uva Cani, Uva degli Osti, Uva Dell'occhio Piccola, Uva Delle Donne, Uva Delle Peccore, Uvarella, Uvina, Vecia, Verdicchio Bastardo Bianco, Vissanello and Vissanello bianco.

Pecorino is sometimes confused with the Calabrian wine grape Greco bianco because Greco is often called Pecorello bianco.
