= Verdicchio =

Variety of grape

- Grape (Vitis)
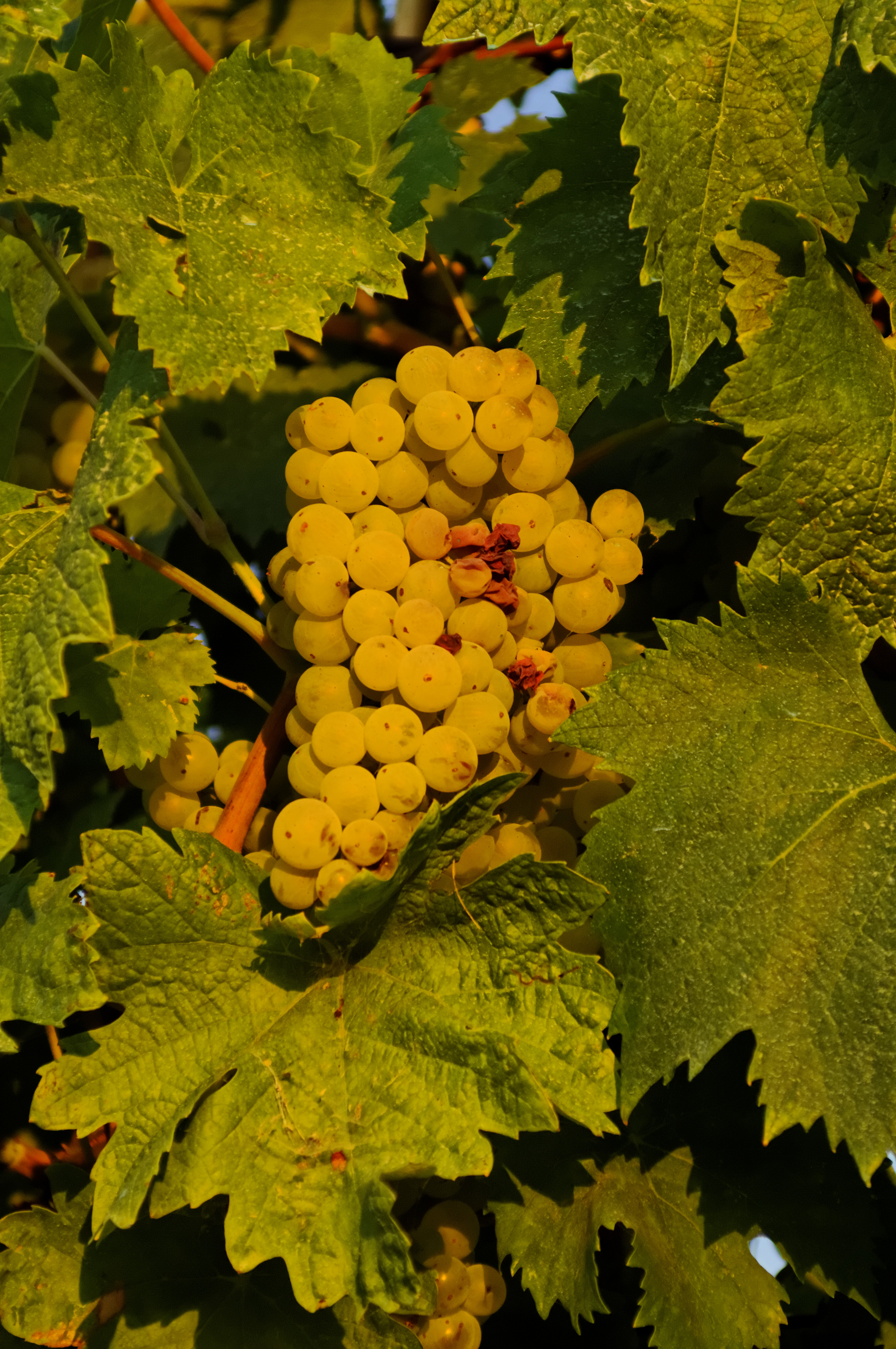
- Verdicchio grapes ripening in late August, Marche region, Italy
- Color of berry skin: White
- Species: Vitis vinifera
- Also called: Boschera bianca, Giallo, Maceratese, Maggiore, Trebbiano verde; more synonyms
- Origin: Italy
- Notable regions: Marche; Umbria; Lazio
- Notable wines: DOC wines: Verdicchio dei Castelli di Jesi, Verdicchio di Matelica, Esino, Colli Pesaresi
- VIVC number: 12963

Verdicchio (/vɛərˈdiːkioʊ/, also US: /vɜːrˈ-, -kjoʊ, vɛərˈdɪkioʊ/, Italian: [verˈdikkjo]) is a white Italian wine grape variety grown primarily in the Marche region of central Italy. The name Verdicchio derives from verde (or "green") and refers to the slight green/yellow hue that wines made from the grape can have.

Verdicchio is the principal grape behind two denominazione di origine controllata (DOC) wines produced in the provinces of Macerata and Ancona, Verdicchio di Matelica and Verdicchio dei Castelli di Jesi. In addition to producing still wines, Verdicchio grapes are also used to make sparkling wine and straw wine.

== History ==
Verdicchio has had a long history in the Marche region of central Italy with documents noting its presence there since at least the 14th century. Despite its sensitivity to climate conditions and propensity to produce variable yields of variable quality wine, Verdicchio was a very popular planting in central Italy with an estimated 65,000 hectares planted in the mid-1980s. These figures made Verdicchio the 15th most planted variety of any grape in the world, ahead of well-known varieties like Chardonnay, Pinot noir, Sauvignon blanc and Sangiovese.

While ampelographers believe that Verdicchio is probably indigenous to the Marche, there appears to be a genetic relation to Trebbiano and Greco grape varieties. In particular, the clones of Trebbiano grown in Lombardy and Soave show very close similarities to Verdicchio while genetic evidence has shown that Greco was probably an ancestor vine to nearly all of Italy's native white grape varieties.

== Wine regions ==
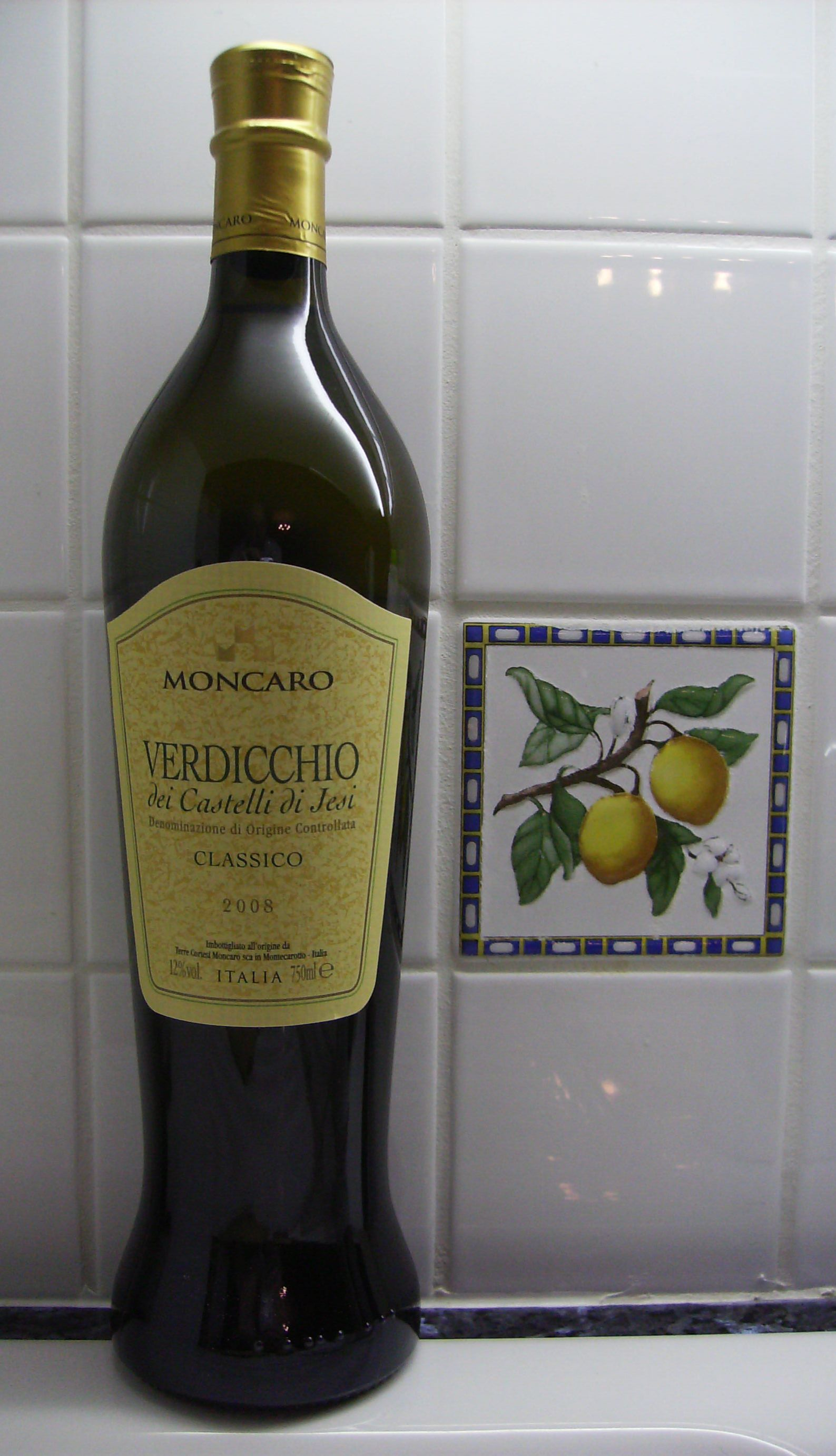
Verdicchio dei Castelli di Jesi in the classic Anfora bottle, a DOC wine from Marche, Italy

While Verdicchio is widely grown throughout the Marche, Umbria and Lazio regions, it is most often encountered in the DOC wines of Verdicchio di Matelica and Verdicchio dei Castelli di Jesi. Castelli di Jesi, located around the commune of Iesi in the Ancona province, is the larger of the two areas and tends to produce a higher volume of wine. In Matelica, located in the nearby province of Macerata, the yields for Verdicchio are more restricted under DOC regulation with the best vineyard locations situated along hillsides of the Esino Valley.

=== DOC regions ===
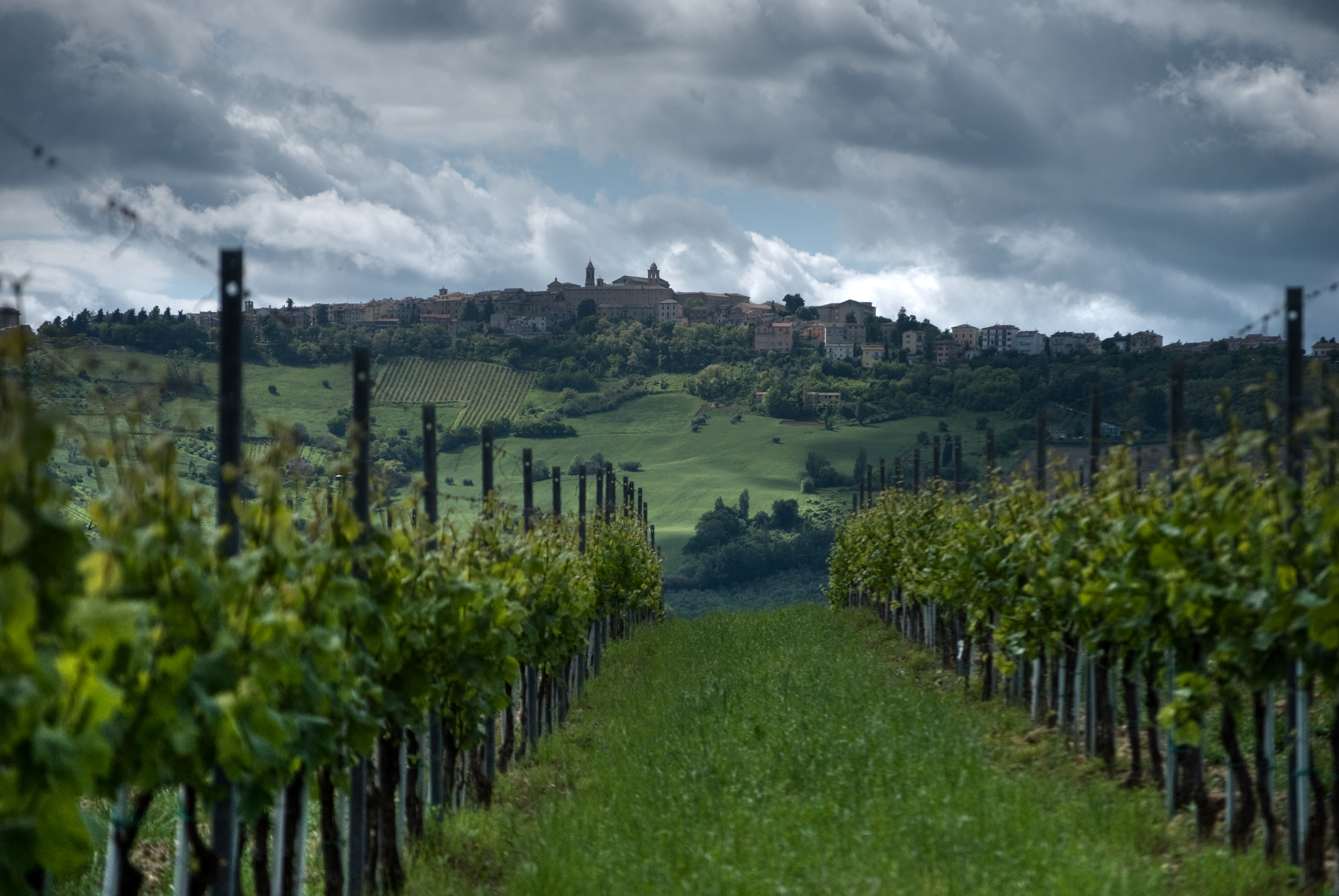
Verdicchio vines growing in Cupramontana (AN)

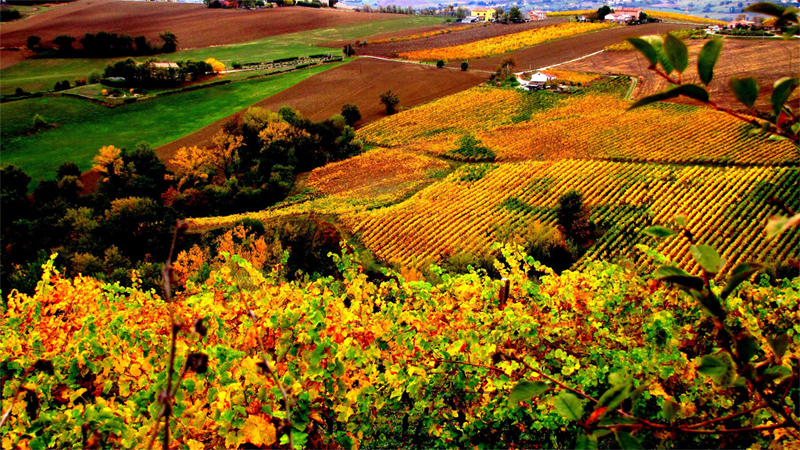
Verdicchio vines growing in Montecarotto (AN)

The following is a list of DOCs that include Verdicchio as a permitted grape variety, along with other grapes that may be included in the blend in varying percentages that are regulated under the DOC label. The wines for which Verdicchio must account for a majority of the blend are in bold.

- Cerveteri DOC (Lazio) – primarily Trebbiano, Romagnolo, Moscato Giallo and Malvasia with up to 15% of Verdicchio permitted along with Friulano, Bellone and/or Bombino.
- Circeo DOC (Lazio) – primarily Trebbiano with up to 15% of Verdicchio permitted along with other local white varieties.
- Colli Maceratesi DOC (Marche) – primarily Maceratino with up to 30% of Verdicchio permitted along with Chardonnay, Sauvignon blanc, Incrocio Bruni, Pecorino (grape), Trebbiano, Malvasia and Grechetto. In addition to the still wine, Verdicchio is permitted in the blend of the spumante and passito wines as well.
- Colli Martani DOC (Umbria) – primarily Trebbiano and/or Grechetto with up to 15% of Verdicchio permitted in these varietally labeled wines along with Garganega and Malvasia.
- Colli Perugini DOC (Umbria) – primarily Trebbiano with between 15 and 35% of Verdicchio and/or Grechetto and Garganega.
- Colli Pesaresi DOC (Marche) – can be made primarily of Verdicchio but can also be blended with Biancame, Pinot gris, Pinot noir (w/o any maceration prior to fermentation), Riesling Italico, Sauvignon blanc, Pinot blanc, Chardonnay and Trebbiano.
- Colli del Trasimeno DOC (Umbria) – primarily Trebbiano with up to 40% of Verdicchio permitted along with Verdello, Malvasia and Grechetto.
- Controguerra DOC – primarily Trebbiano and Passerina with up to 25% of Verdicchio permitted along with other local white varieties. In the sparkling spumante, Verdicchio, Pecorino and Chardonnay are blended with Trebbiano.
- Esino DOC (Marche) – 50–100% Verdicchio with other local white varieties permitted up to 50%.
- Falerio dei Colli Ascolani DOC (Marche) – primarily Trebbiano with up to 15% of Verdicchio permitted along with Passerina, Malvasia, Pinot blanc and Pecorino.
- Lacrima di Morro d'Alba DOC (Marche) – primarily Lacrima (grape), a red wine, with up to 15% of Verdicchio permitted.
- Marino DOC (Lazio) – primarily Malvasia and Trebbiano with up to 10% of Verdicchio permitted along with other local white varieties.
- **Verdicchio dei Castelli di Jesi DOC** (Marche) – a minimum of 85% Verdicchio with Trebbiano and Malvasia permitted to fill in the remaining portions of wine. In addition to a still version both a sparkling spumante and sweet passito style are produced in the DOC from Verdicchio.
- **Verdicchio di Matelica DOC** (Marche) – a minimum of 85% Verdicchio with Trebbiano and Malvasia permitted to fill in the remaining portions of wine. In addition to a still version a spumante and a passito style are produced in the DOC from Verdicchio.

== Wine styles ==
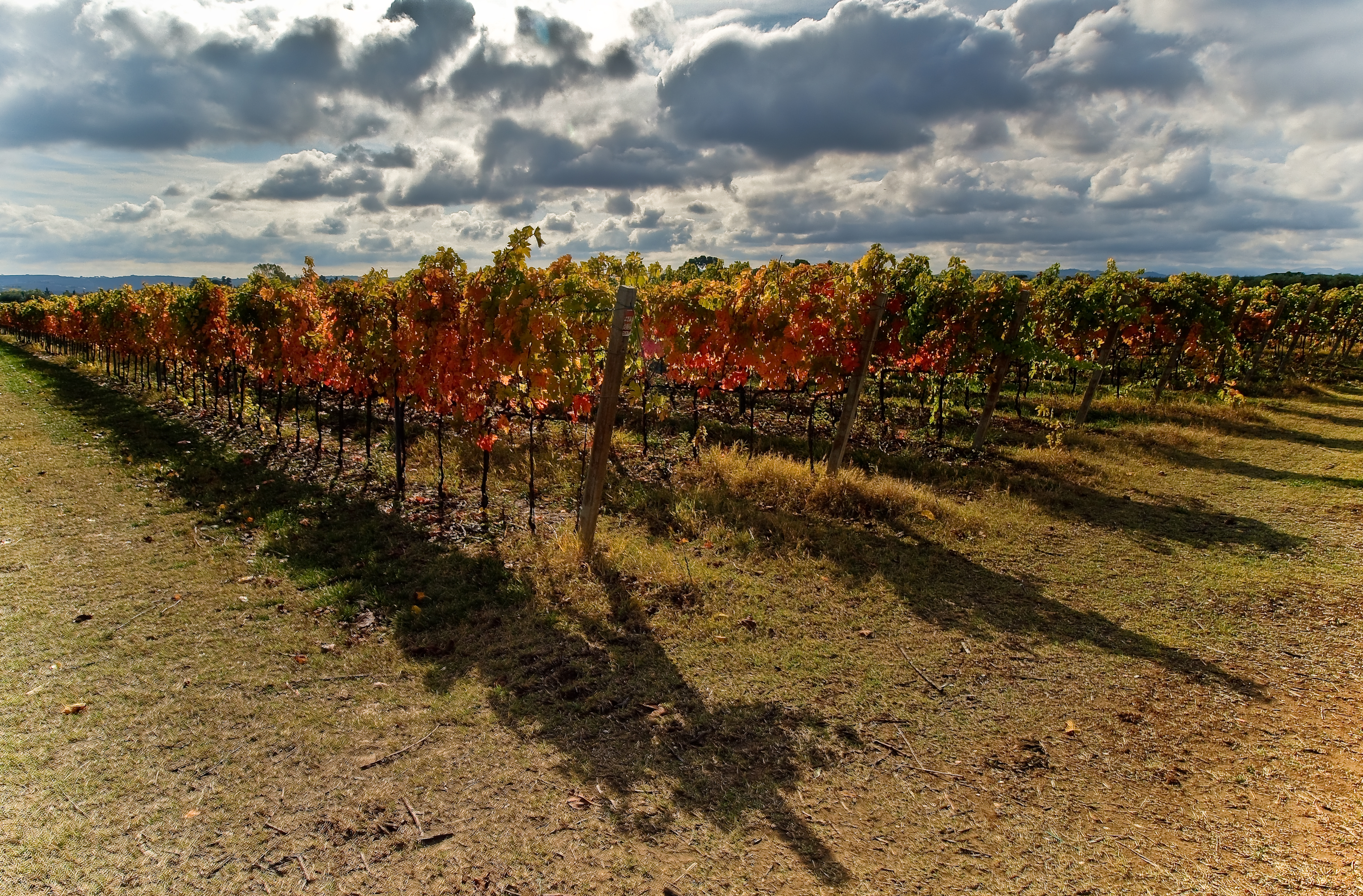
Verdicchio vines in late October, nearing harvest

Verdicchio can produce wines that are virtually colorless with noticeably high acidity that can come across on the palate with citrus notes. According to wine expert Jancis Robinson, well made examples from favorable vintages can have flavors of lemons and slight bitter almond notes. Robinson also notes that the naturally high acidity of the grape makes it a good base cuvée variety for producing sparkling wine.

According to Oz Clarke, the quality of Verdicchio wines has improved since the later half of the 20th century as producers limit yields even beyond DOC regulation to produce fuller flavored grapes that can better balance its high acidity. Clarke goes on to note that the subtlety of Verdicchio flavors allows it to pair very well with a variety of foods.

== Clonal variation and plantings ==
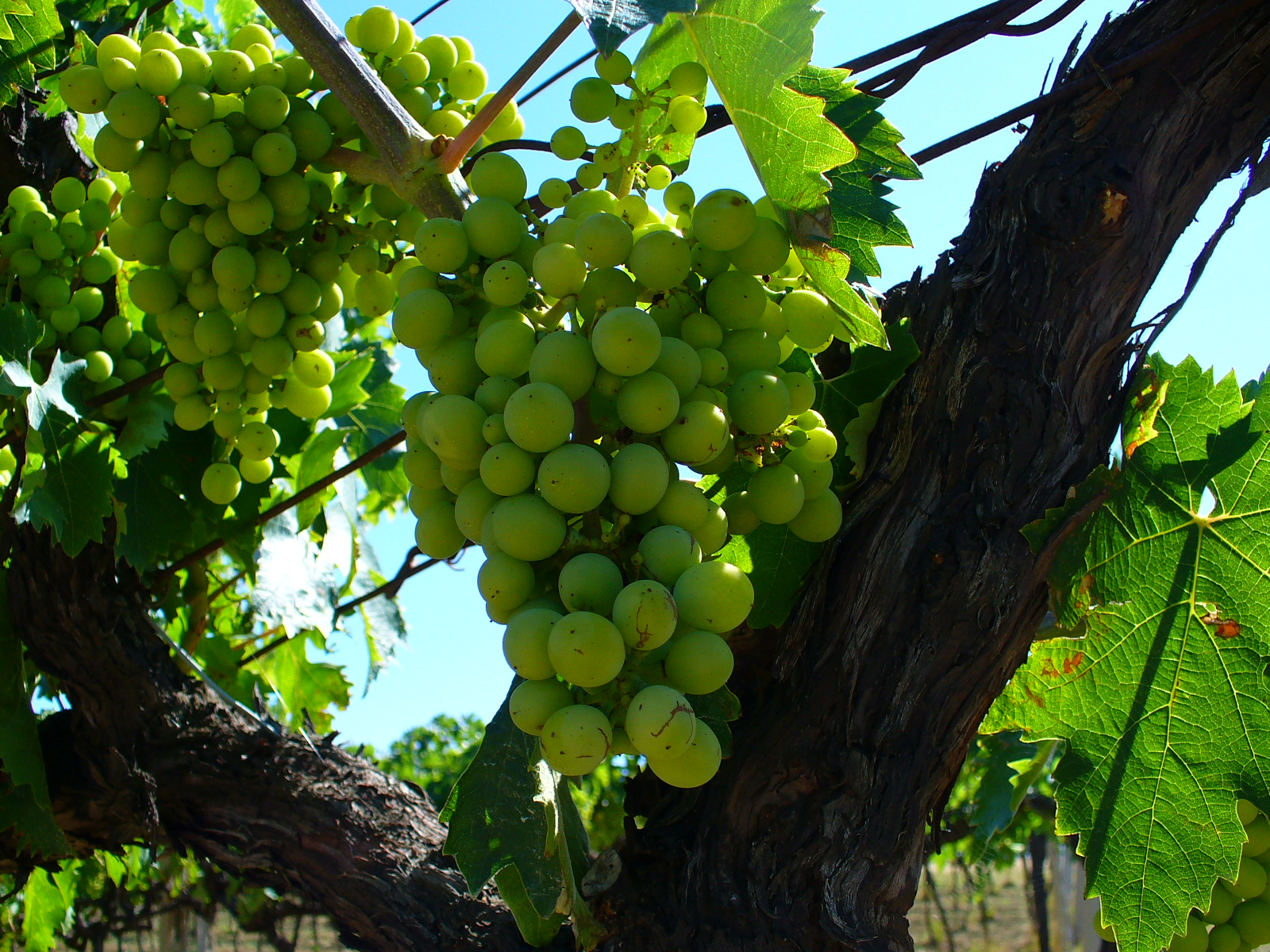
Verdicchio shares several synonyms with Trebbiano (pictured) and the two varieties can sometimes be confused for each other.

The Verdicchio grapevine is very susceptible to clonal mutations with several sub-varieties of the grape known to exist in central Italy under various synonyms (see section below). Like with many varieties of Italian wine grapes, this makes an exact cataloging of the number of plantings difficult. In her book, Jancis Robinson's Guide to Wine Grapes, Robinson reports in 1996 that there were nearly 10,000 acres (4,000 ha) of Verdicchio found mostly in the provinces along the Adriatic coast. That number is dramatically reduced from the number of plantings of Verdicchio in the mid-1980s when there was an estimated 65,000 hectares (all in Italy). However, some wine experts, including Jancis Robinson, speculate that it is likely that some of those plantings were actually Trebbiano.

== Synonyms ==
Over the years Verdicchio and its wines have been known under various synonyms, including Boschera bianca, Giallo, Maceratese, Maggiore, Marchigiano, Mazzanico, Niuivres, Peloso, Peverella, Peverello, Peverenda, Peverise bianco, Pfeffer, Pfeffertraube, Terbiana, Torbiana, Trebbiano di Lugana, Trebbiano di Soave, Trebbiano verde, Trebbiano Veronese, Turbiana, Turbiana Moscato, Turbiano, Turviana, Uva Aminea, Uva Marana, Verdello duro persico, Verdicchio bianco, Verdicchio Dolce, Verdicchio Doratel, Verdicchio Doratello, Verdicchio Giallo, Verdicchio Marchigiano, Verdicchio Marino, Verdicchio Peloso, Verdicchio Scroccarello, Verdicchio Seroccarello, Verdicchio Straccione, Verdicchio Stretto, Verdicchio Verdaro, Verdicchio verde, Verdicchio Verzaro, Verdicchio Verzello, Verdone, Verzaro and Verzello verde.

== See also ==
- List of Italian grape varieties
