= Verdicchio (grapes) =

Verdicchio is the name or synonym of several wine and grape varieties including:

- Verdicchio, from the Marche region
- Verdicchio Bastardo bianco, another name for Pecorino
- Verdicchio Femmina, another name for Verdeca
- Verdicchio Giallo, another name for Verdea
- Verdicchio Marina, another name for Maceratino
- Verdicchio nera, another name for Greco nero
