= Bianchello del Metauro =

Italian controlled wine origin in Marche

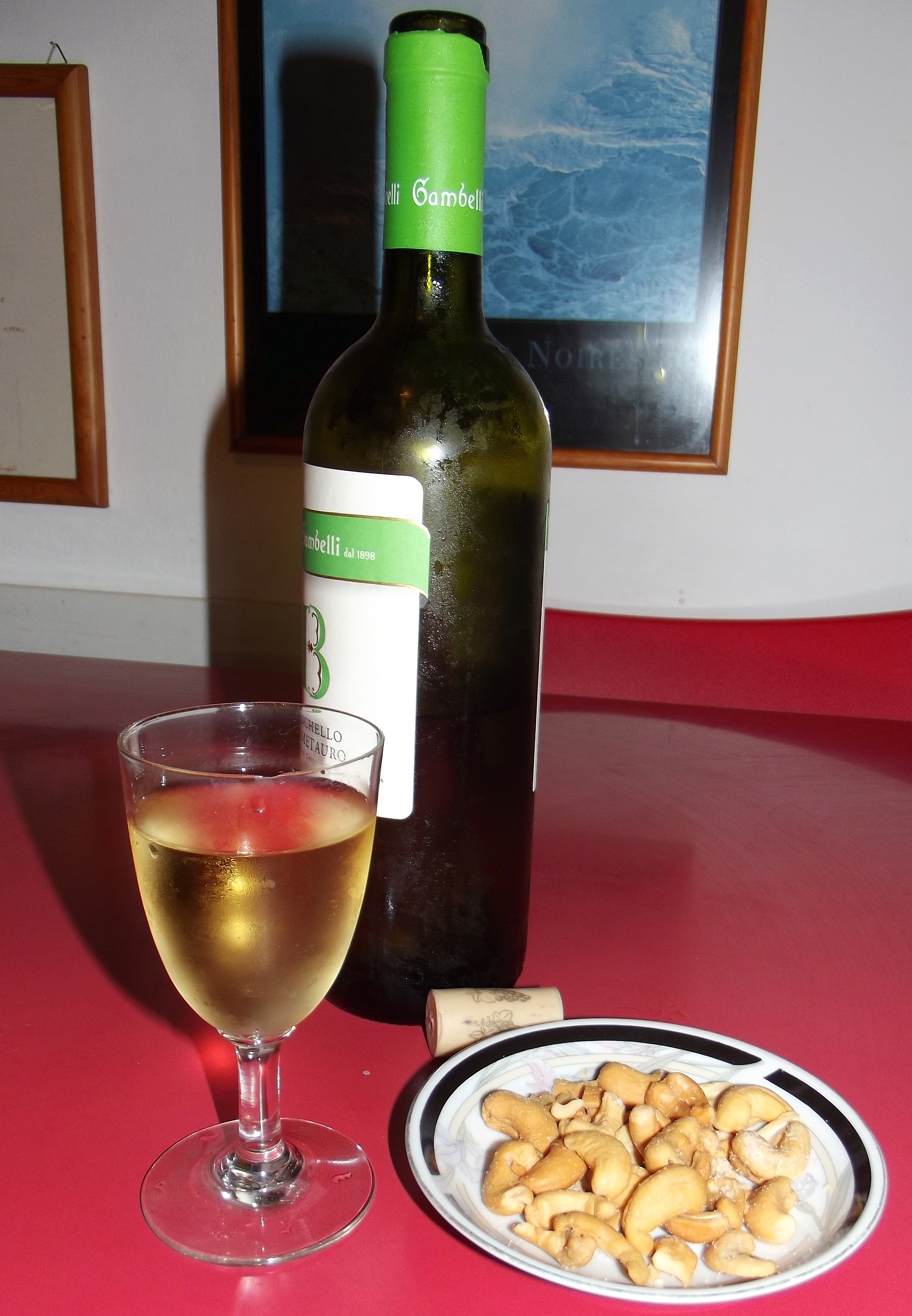
A bottle of Bianchello del Metauro

Bianchello del Metauro is a denominazione di origine controllata wine made in the province of Pesaro and Urbino, in the region of Marche, Italy. The DOC was created in 1969.

== Geography ==
The region lies on the eastern coast of Italy, close to Pesaro, and encompassing the towns of Fano and Senigallia. The wine region completely lies within two larger DOCs: Colli Pesaresi and Falerio dei Colli Ascolani, and shares its southern part with the Lacrima di Morro d´Alba DOC.

The wine region consists of hills running west to east along the Metauro River, in northern Marche. The soil is mostly sandy clay.

== History ==
According to legend, the Roman army defeated a Carthaginian force led by Hannibal's brother, Hasdrubal, due to the vast consumption of Bianchello wine prior to the battle.

== Wine ==
Bianchello del Metauro is unique because it is made almost completely with the Bianchello (also known as Biancame or Biancuccio) grape. According to the regulations for the DOC, Bianchello must consist of at least 95% of the blend.
