= Spoletino =

Spoletino may refer to:

- Trebbiano, grape variety
- Grechetto, grape variety
