= Drupeggio =

Variety of grape

Drupeggio (also known as Canaiolo bianco) is a white Italian wine grape variety that is grown in the Central Italy wine regions of Tuscany and Orvieto. The grape is often confused for the white Tuscan variety Vernaccia di San Gimignano, which is also known under the synonym Canaiolo bianco and may be counted as one and the same in field blends.

Drupeggio is a permitted variety in several Denominazione di origine controllata (DOC)s including Orvieto in Umbria where it is usually blended with Trebbiano, Verdello, Grechetto and Malvasia Toscana and in the red and rosé wines of Barco Reale di Carmignano where it can blended with Sangiovese and Cabernet Sauvignon. It is also a permitted variety for use in Vin Santo production but the grape's limited ability to raisin sufficiently for use in straw wine production makes its appearance in these Italian dessert wines very rare.

== History ==
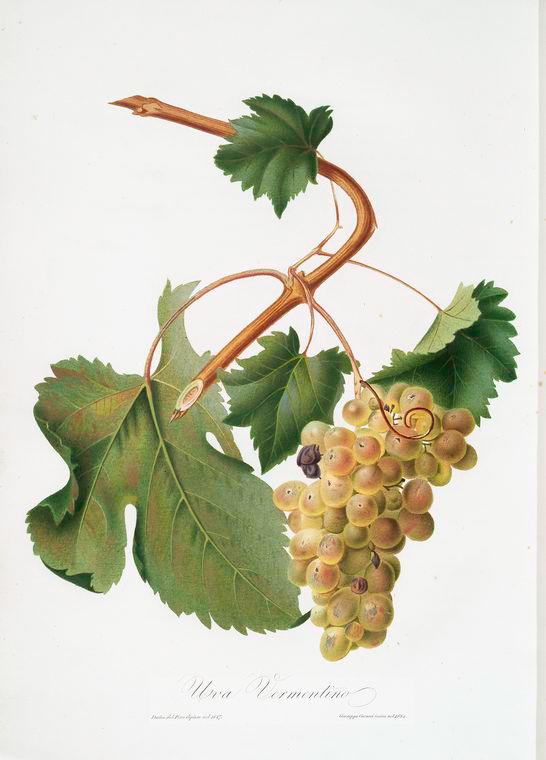
Vermentino, one of the white grape varieties that Drupeggio is often confused for in Tuscany.

The first recorded mention of Drupeggio was in Tuscany under it is synonym Canaiolo bianco where it was recorded being used in wine production as early as 1817. Unlike the pink-skinned grape variety Canaiolo rosa, Canaiolo bianco is not a color mutation of the red Tuscan wine grape Canaiolo that can be used in the blended wines of Chianti. The exact origins of the variety is not known but DNA profiling completed in 2011 show that at least six different white grape varieties growing in Tuscany have been variously labeled as being Canaiolo bianco—the most notable being the Vernaccia di San Gimignano variety that is widely used in the Denominazione di Origine Controllata e Garantita (DOCG) of the same name. Other varieties that are sometimes confused with Drupeggio include Vermentino and the virtually extinct Tuscan variety of Zuccaccio.

== Viticulture ==
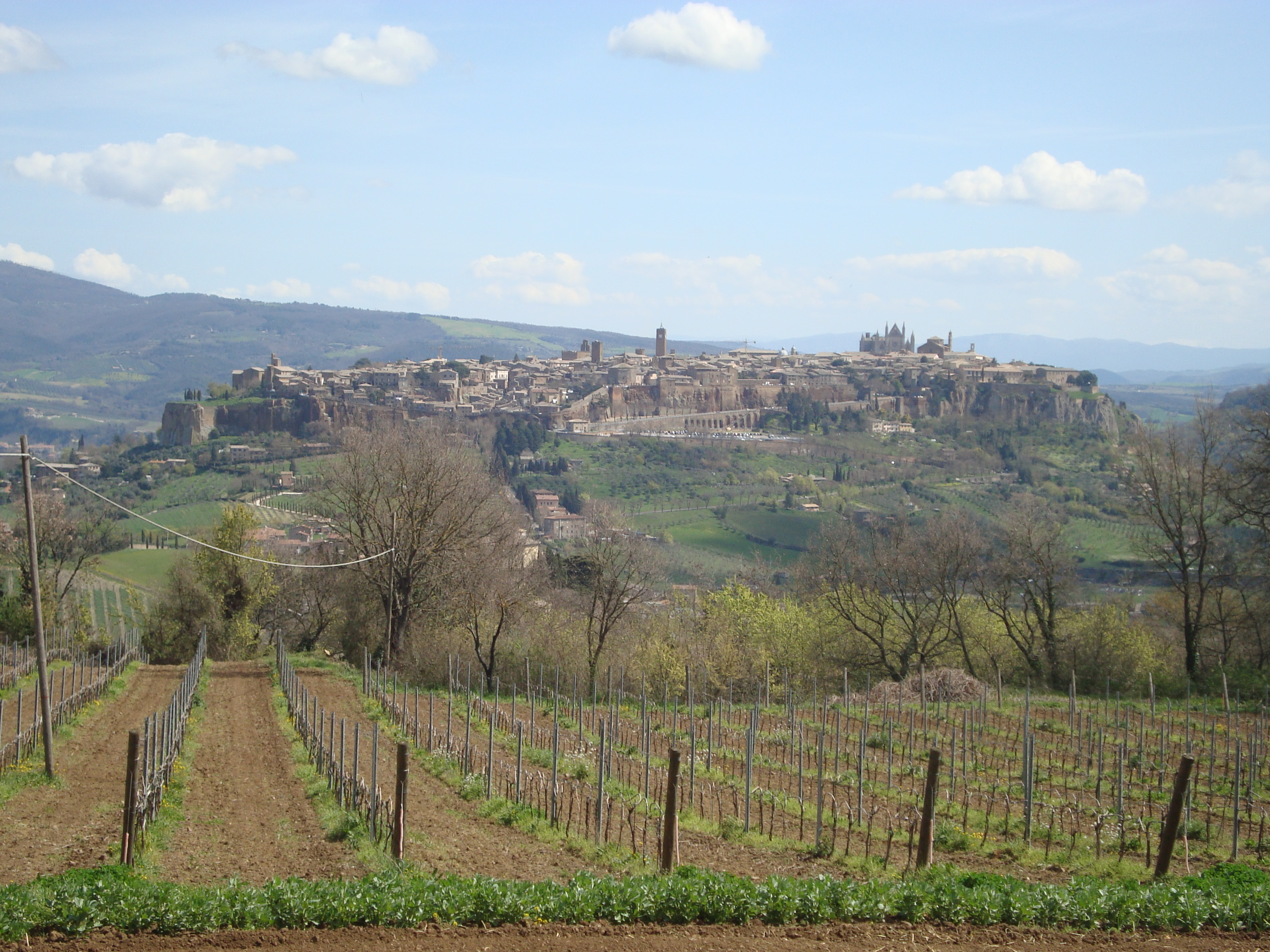
The Orvieto region in Umbria where Drupeggio is grown.

Drupeggio is a mid to late ripening grape variety. With relatively thick skins for a white grape variety, Druppeggio berries tend not to raisin very easily which makes it use in the production of passito or straw wines, such as Vin Santo, very rare even though it is a permitted variety in several DOCs for the dessert wine. While several grape varieties, particularly in Tuscan, are known under the synonym of Canaiolo bianco, the clone Canaiolo bianco ARSIAL-CRA 402 is the only official clone of Canaiolo bianco that is actually Drupeggio.

== Wine regions ==
Drupeggio is almost exclusively found in its home land of Italy where it is planted across the central part of the region from the Molise and Marche of eastern Italy to the Lazio, Umbria and Tuscan regions in the west. Due to its confusion with other grape varieties, particularly Vernaccia di San Gimignano in Tuscany, it is difficult to get an exact number of plantings with the 2000 census reporting 674 hectares (1,670 acres) and likely including some of the "other" Canaiolo biancos in the total.

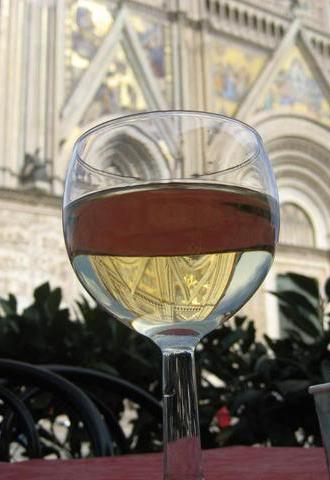
A glass of Orvieto wine.

The vast majority of "true" Drupeggio plantings are found in the Umbria region where it can be an important blending variety in the wines of Orvieto. Here Drupeggio, along with Grechetto and Malvasia Toscana, can make up to 20-30% of the blend along with Trebbiano (50-65%) and Verdello (15-25%). Outside of Umbria, it is found in the provinces of Firenze, Grosseto and Pistoia where it is permitted to be blended with Malvasia and Trebbiano in several Tuscan DOCs. In the Carmignano region, up to 10% of Drupeggio is permitted to be used in the red and rosé wines of the "declassified" DOC of Barco Reale where it may be blended with Sangiovese, Cabernet Sauvignon, Canaiolo nero, Trebbiano and Cabernet Franc.

== Synonyms ==
Over the years, Drupeggio has been known under a variety of synonyms including: Bottaio bianco (in Tuscany), Cacinello, Cacciumo (in the province of Campobasso in Molise, Canaiolo bianco, Canajola, Canina (in the province of Ascoli Piceno in the Marche), Drupeccio (in Orvieto), Lupeccio, Trupeccio (in Orvieto), Uva dei Cani (in Ascoli Piceno) and Volpicchio (in Tuscany).
