= Colli Maceratesi DOC =

Italian controlled red wine origin in Marche

Colli Maceratesi is a denominazione di origine controllata wine made in the province of Macerata, in the Italian region of Marche. The DOC was created in 1975, and allows white and red wines.

== Geography ==
The region lies on the eastern coast of Italy, surrounding the town of Macerata. It also encompasses the towns of Sforzacosta, Pollenza, Corridonia and Tolentino.

== The Maceratino grape ==
Like many wines of the Marche, Colli Maceratesi uses an obscure local Italian grape in its blend: Maceratino. This rare grape must comprise at least 80% of the blend. Up to 20% Trebbiano Toscano, Verdicchio, Malvasia Toscana and/or Chardonnay is also allowed.

The red blend must comprise at least %50% Sangiovese, with the remaining 50% allotted to any combination of Cabernet Franc, Cabernet Sauvignon, Ciliegiolo, Lacrima, Merlot and/or Montepulciano.

The red wine of this appellation is called Colli Maceratesi Rosso and must comprise at least 50% of the Sangiovese grape with the remaining 50% from Cabernet Franc, Cabernet Sauvignon, Ciliegiolo, Lacrima Merlot and Montepulciano.
