= Vin Santo =

Italian dessert wine

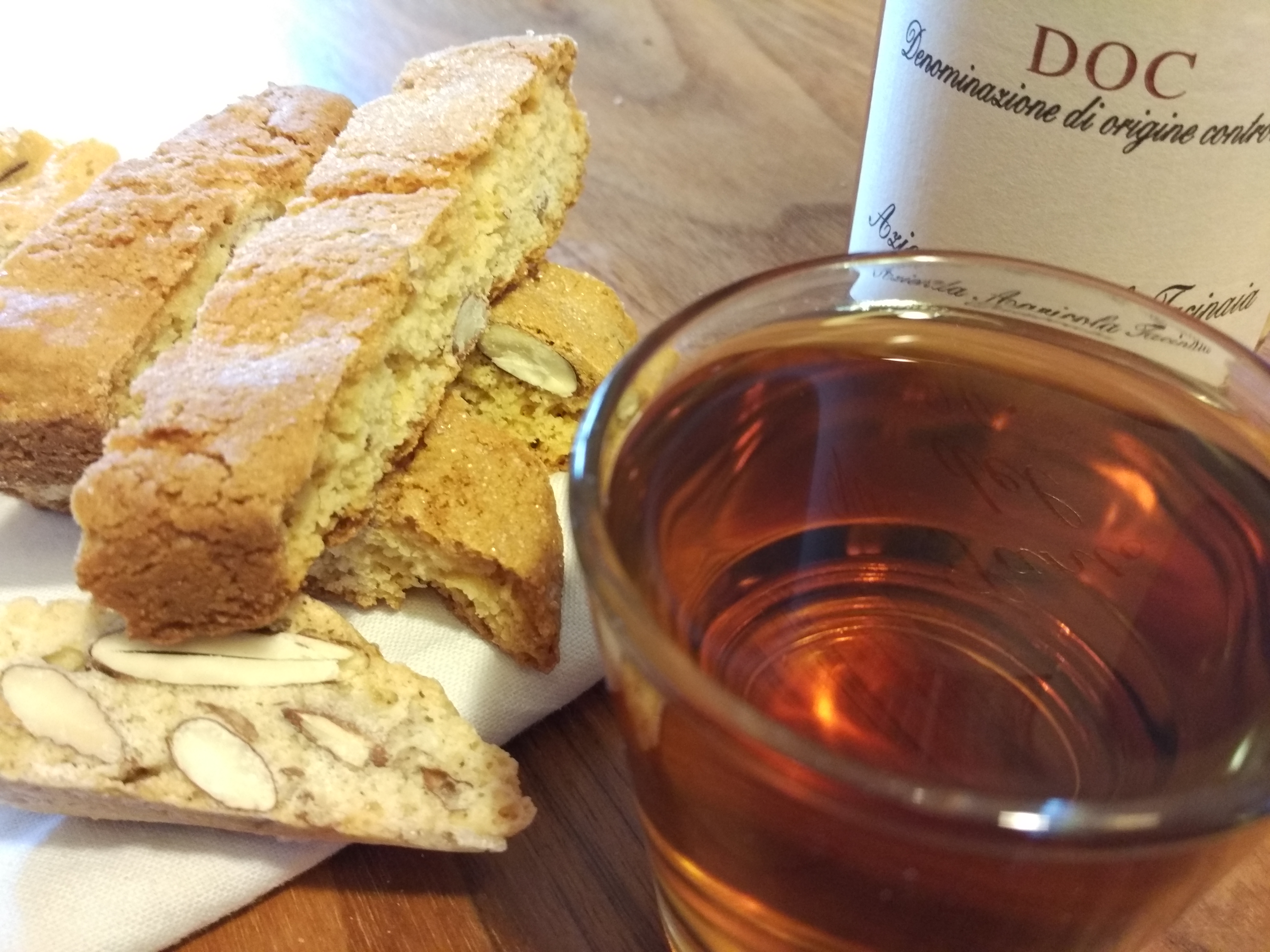
- A glass of Vin Santo with its characteristic amber colour and cantuccini
- Type: Dessert wine
- Region of origin: Tuscany, Italy

Vin Santo (Italian: [vin ˈsanto]; lit. 'Holy Wine') is a style of Italian dessert wine. Traditional in Tuscany, these wines are often made from white grape varieties such as Trebbiano and Malvasia, although Sangiovese may be used to produce a rosé style known as "Occhio di Pernice" or eye of the partridge. The wines may also be described as straw wines since they are often produced by drying the freshly harvested grapes on straw mats in a warm and well ventilated area of the house (however, several producers dry the grapes by hanging on racks indoors). Although technically a dessert wine, a Vin Santo can vary in sweetness levels from bone dry (like a Fino Sherry) to extremely sweet. While the style is believed to have originated in Tuscany, examples of Vin Santo can be found throughout Italy and it is an authorised style of wine for several denominazione di origine controllata (DOC) and indicazione geografica tipica (IGT).

== Origins of the name ==
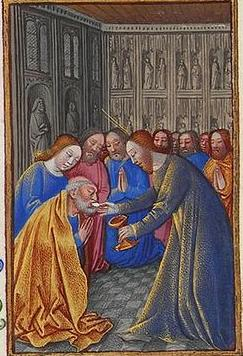
The most probable origin of the name Vin Santo was from the wine's use and association with the sacrament of the Eucharist.

Although the style of making wine from dried grapes has been around almost as long as wine has been made, there are many theories on how the particular name Vin Santo or "holy wine" came to be associated with this style of wine in Italy. The most probable origin was the wine's historic use in the Catholic Mass, where sweet wine was often preferred. One of the earliest references to a vinsanto wine comes from the Renaissance era sales logs of Florentine wine merchants who widely marketed the strong, sweet wine in Rome and elsewhere. Eventually the term vinsanto became almost an umbrella name for this style of wine produced elsewhere in Italy. When the Greek island of Santorini came under rule of the Ottoman Empire, the ruling Turks encouraged the island's wine production of a sweet dessert wine made from dried grapes. Over the next few centuries, this wine became known as Vin Santo and was widely exported to Russia, where it was used in the Eucharist by the Russian Orthodox Church.

Another claim is that when the island of Santorini was ruled by Venice, packages sent from the island were labelled "Santo" to denote their origin, while their contents were labelled "Vin"; thus the term Vinsanto was born.

Other, probably apocryphal, stories on the name's origin attribute its naming to the work of a 14th-century friar from the province of Siena who would use the leftover wine from Mass to cure the sick. The miraculous healing became associated with the santo or "holy" wine and the name Vin Santo was allegedly born. Another 15th-century story involves John Bessarion, a patriarch of the Greek Orthodox Church. According to legend, at the Ecumenical Council of Florence of 1439 a local Florentine wine called Vin Pretto ('pure wine') was served. After trying the wine, Bessarion is said to have liked it and remarked that it was like Xanthos, alluding to the famous straw wine of Thrace (although some sources said he described the wine as Xantho or "yellow"). The Florentine locals thought they heard the patriarch describe the wine as Santo and they accordingly started promoting the wine as a "holy wine". Another oft-cited theory for the name association is the tradition of starting fermentation around All Saints' Day and bottling the wine during Easter week.

== Production methods ==
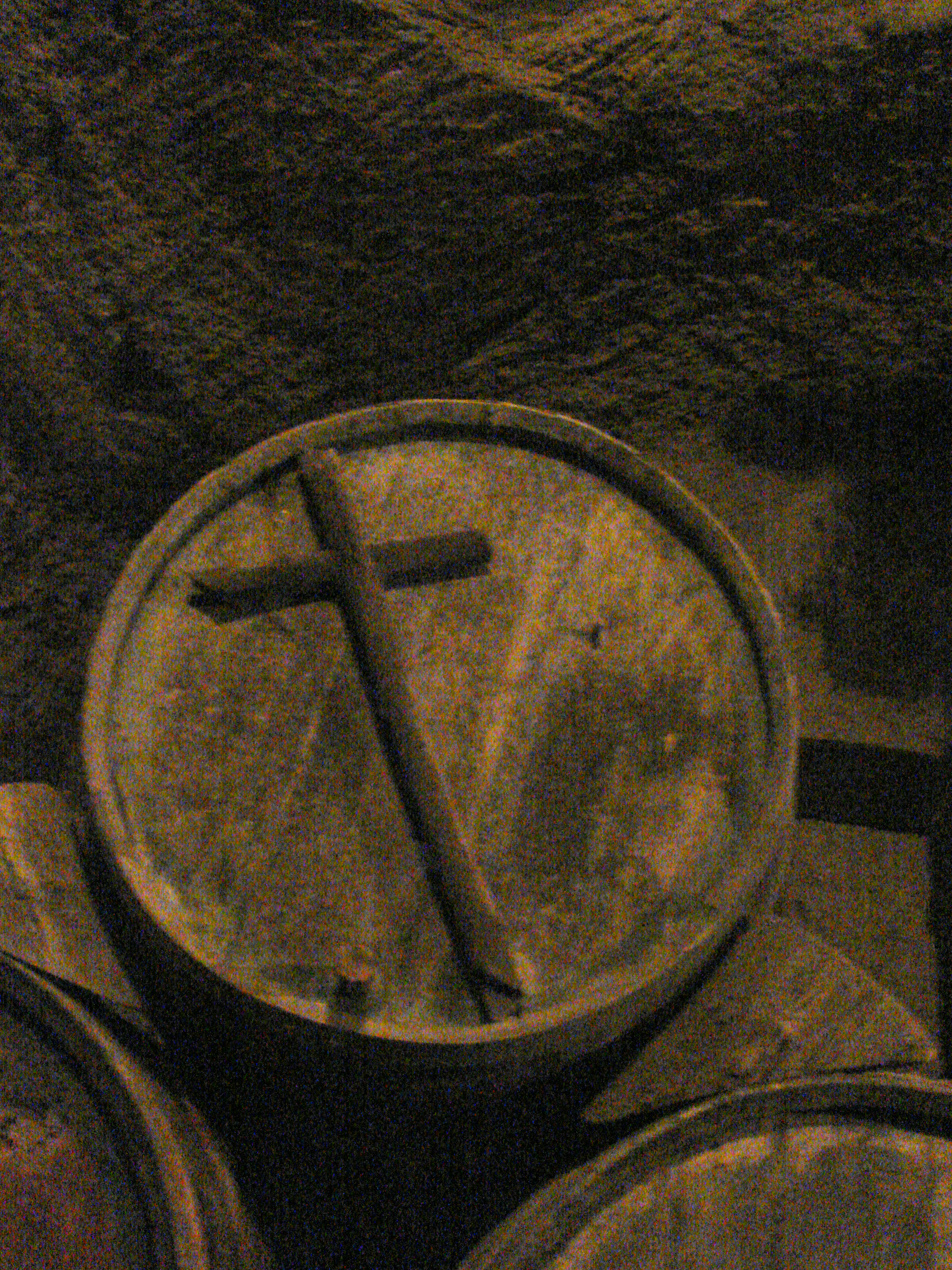
Barrels used for the ageing of Vin Santo are often marked with the Christian cross.

After the grapes destined for Vin Santo are harvested in September or October, they are laid out on straw mats, often under rafters or staircases. They are kept in warm, well ventilated rooms that allow the moisture in the grape to evaporate. This process of desiccation allows the sugars in the grape to be more concentrated. The longer the grapes are allowed to dry and desiccate, the higher the resulting residual sugar levels will be in the wine. Depending on the style of wine desired, the grapes may be crushed and the fermentation process started after a few weeks or not till late March. Producers may use a starter culture of yeast known as a madre that includes a small amount of finished Vin Santo from previous years production. It is believed that this older wine can help jump start the fermentation process and also add complexity to the wine.

After fermentation the grapes are then aged in small oak barrels. In many DOC regions, the wines are required to age for at least 3 years though it is not uncommon for producers to age their wines for 5 to 10 years. Traditionally the barrels were made of chestnut instead of oak, which contributed high amounts of wood tannins and was very porous which promoted excessive evaporation in the barrel. Under this same traditional style of winemaking, a large ullage or air space would emerge in the barrel and oxidation took place. This gave the wine its characteristic amber, but also flavours and traits that may be characterised as wine faults. Towards the end of the 20th century, more producers began switching to oak barrels while maintaining the tradition of not topping up the barrels and filling in the ullage space. This angel's share still produces some level of oxidation, though not as severe as the style was historically made. Modern winemaking technique also calls for more temperature control and keeping the wine in rooms with a consistent temperature that promotes more fresh flavours in the wine and fewer faults.

Some producers will still use non-oak barrels, such as chestnut, juniper and cherry wood and may even blend batches of Vin Santo aged in different wood barrels together. This has the potential of giving the wines more layers of complexity in much the same way that vinegar producers in the Emilia-Romagna region use different wood types to add complexity to their vinegar. As a fall back, if their wines become too oxidised or do not develop the way the producer wishes, some Vin Santo may be intentionally converted into vinegar that is very desirable in the culinary market.

== Wine styles ==
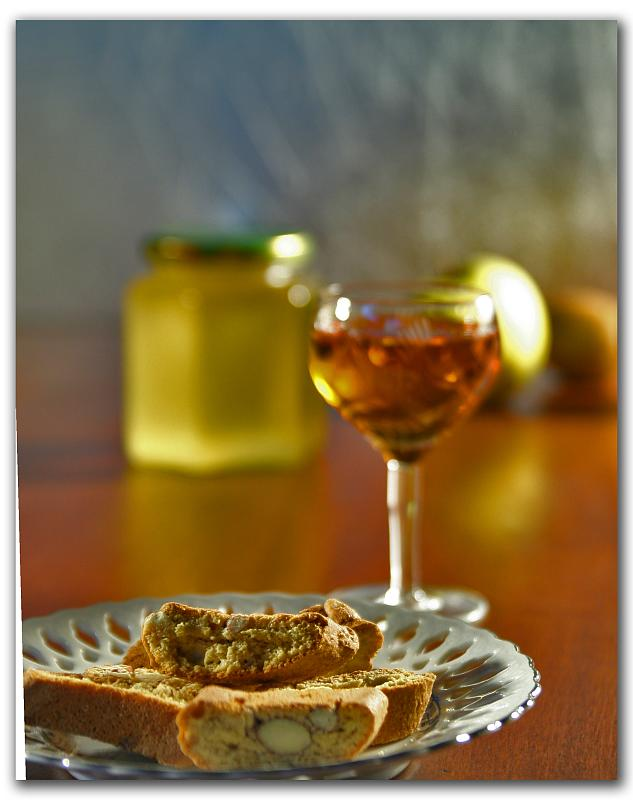
Vin Santo is traditionally paired with biscotti (cantuccini) for dipping into the wine.

The styles, colour, sweetness and quality of Vin Santo can vary widely depending on the grape varieties and production methods used to make the wine. While white grapes, such as Trebbiano and Malvasia in Tuscany, are most widely used, red grape varieties (such as Sangiovese) can be used to produce a rosé style wine. When red grape varieties are used, the wine is often labelled as Occhio di Pernice, which has its own DOC classification in several regions of Italy. The wines can be made to fit any style of sweetness levels from bone dry, almost Fino Sherry-like, to extremely sweet and on par with the botrytised wines of France and Germany. The wines can even be fortified with grape spirit added during fermentation, such as Port. These fortified examples are usually labelled as Vin Santo Liquoroso.

The colour of wine Vin Santo can range from a pale to dark amber to even neon orange. The flavours typical of Vin Santo often include nutty or raisin notes with honey and cream attributes. In Italy it is traditionally served with biscotti (cantuccini) that may be dunked into the wine.

== Wine regions ==
For most of the 20th century, Vin Santo was often sold as basic vino da tavola ('table wine') due to Italian wine authorities' difficulties in classifying the many different styles of the wine. Today most of the major Italian wine producing regions have their own DOCs for specific Vin Santo wines produced in those areas. While the style is traditionally associated with Tuscany, examples can be found on the international wine market from throughout Italy. In the autonomous province of Trento, a dried straw wine made from the Nosiola grape is popularly labelled as Vino Santo. A noticeable difference between the Trentino and Tuscan examples is that the Trentino wines are usually less oxidised due to the wines regularly being "topped up" to prevent a large ullage.

=== Tuscan DOCs ===
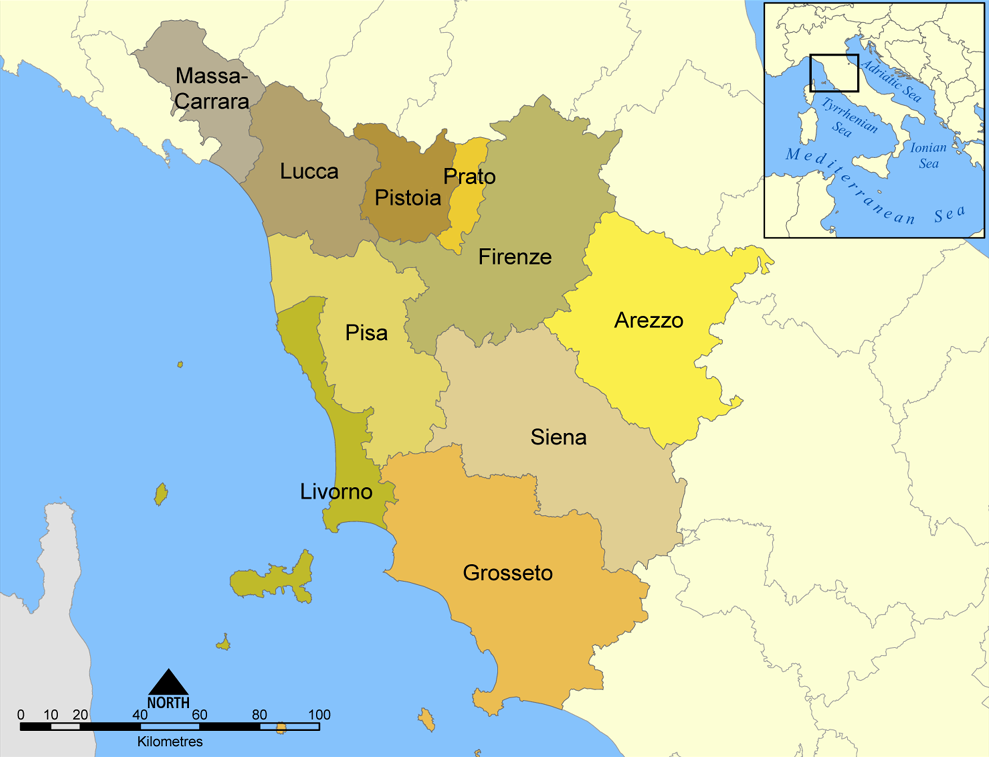
While Vin Santo wines are produced throughout Italy, the vast majority of production takes place in the provinces of Tuscany.

Partial list of Tuscan DOC regions that are permitted to produce a Vin Santo style wine.

- Bianco dell'empolese in Tuscany, located near the town of Empoli along the River Arno. The wine must have a minimum alcohol content of 11% and be composed of at least 80% Trebbiano with the remaining 20% composed of local white grape varieties. The wine must be aged for at least 3 years before it can be released on the market.
- Bianco Pisano di San Torpe DOC in Tuscany, located in the valleys of the province of Pisa. The wine must have a minimum alcohol content of 16% and be composed of at least 75% Trebbiano with other local red and white grape varieties permitted to fill in the remaining 25%. The wine must be aged in wood barrels for at least 4 years prior to release.
- Bianco della Valdinievole DOC in Tuscany, located near the villages of Montecatini and Pescia. The wine must have a minimum alcohol content of at least 17% and be composed of at least 70% Trebbiano. Malvasia, Canaiolo bianco and Vermentino may composed up to 25% with other local white grape varieties permitted to fill in the remaining 5%. The wines must be aged for a minimum of 3 years in wood barrels prior to release.
- Cortona DOC in Tuscany, located around the town of Cortona, near the border with Umbria. Both a regular Vin Santo and Occhio di Pernice style are permitted in this DOC region. The wines must have a minimum alcohol level of 11% with the regular Vin Santo composed of at least 85% Sangiovese with other local grape varieties permitted to fill in the remaining 15%. The wine must be aged for at least 3 years prior to release, with wines aged for at least 4 years permitted to bear the Riserva. For Occhio di Pernice, the wine must be composed of at least an 80% blend of Sangiovese and Malvasia with other local grape varieties permitted to fill in the remaining 20%. The ageing requirements for this style of wine in the Cortona DOC is one of the longest for any style of Vin Santo with a required 8 years of ageing needed before the wine can be released on the market.
- Monteregio di Massa Marittima DOC in Tuscany, located in the northwest of the region this is one of Tuscany's most internationally known areas for Vin Santo. Several styles of Vin Santo are permitted here, including Occhio di Pernice and Amabile with a minimum alcohol level of 11%. For regular and Amabile Vin Santo the wine must be composed of at least 70% Trebbiano and Malvasia bianco with other local white grape varieties permitted to fill in the remaining 30%. The wine must be aged for at least 3 years prior to release, with wines aged for a minimum of 4 years permitted to be labelled as Riserva. For Occhio di Pernice the wine must be composed of 50–70% Sangiovese, 10–50% of Malvasia nera and no more than 30% of other local red grape varieties with no white grape varieties permitted at all. The wine must be aged for at least 3 years prior to release.
- Montescudaio DOC in Tuscany, located around the city of Volterra. The wines must have a minimum alcohol level of at least 17% and be composed of 70–85% Trebbiano, 15–30% blend of Malvasia and Vermentino with a maximum of 10% for other local white grape varieties.
- Pomino DOC in Tuscany, located around the commune of Rufina. Both red and white styles of Vin Santo are produced at a variety of sweetness levels ranging from Secco (dry), Amabile (slightly sweet) to Dolce (very sweet) with a minimum alcohol level of 15.5%. The white styles are made from a 60–80% blend of Chardonnay and Pinot blanc, up to 30% Trebbiano and up to 15% of other local white grape varieties. The reds can be composed of 60–75% Sangiovese, 15–25% blend of Canaiolo, Cabernet Sauvignon, and Cabernet Franc, 10–25% of Merlot and up to 15% of other local red grape varieties. Both the red and white styles of Vin Santo must be aged a minimum of 3 years in wood prior to release.
- San Gimignano DOC in Tuscany, the boundary of this DOC overlaps with those for the DOCG wine Vernaccia di San Gimignano. Both a regular white Vin Santo and an Occhio di Pernice are permitted with minimum alcohol levels of at least 11.5%. Regular Vin Santo must be composed of at least 50% Malvasia, 30% Trebbiano, up to 20% Vernaccia and up to 10% of other local grape varieties. The Occhio di Pernice must be composed of 70–100% Sangiovese with other local red grape varieties permitted to fill in the remaining 30%. Both styles need to be aged for at least 3 years prior to release.
- Sant'Ántimo DOC in Tuscany, the boundary of this DOC overlaps with those of the DOCG wine Brunello di Montalcino. Both a white and Occhio di Pernice style are permitted with a minimum alcohol level of 11.5%. For the white styles a blend of Trebbiano and Malvasia bianco must compose at least 70% of the wine with other local white grape varieties permitted to fill in the remaining 30%. The Occhio di Pernice styles are made from 50 to 70% Sangiovese, 30–50% Malvasia nera and up to 20% of other local red grape varieties. Both styles of wines must be aged for at least 3 years with the wines that have received at least 4 years of ageing permitted to label themselves as Riserva.
- Val d'Arbia DOC in Tuscany, this DOC includes some of the Chianti zone that extends into the province of Siena. The wine must have a minimum alcohol level of 17% and be aged for at least 3 years in wood. The wine is composed of 75–85% Trebbiano, 15–25% Malvasia and up to 15% of other local white grape varieties.
- Vin Santo di Montepulciano DOC in Tuscany, like the Sant'Ántimo DOC the boundaries for this DOC overlaps with those of Brunello di Montalcino but with different restrictions on wine production. The white Vin Santo must be composed of a blend of at least 70% Grechetto, Trebbiano and Malvasia with other local white grape varieties permitted to fill in the remaining 30%. The wine is then aged for a minimum of 3 years with those aged for at least four permitted to be labelled as Reserva. The Occhio di Pernice is composed of at least 50% Sangiovese with other local grape varieties permitted to fill in the rest of the blend. The wine is aged for a minimum of 8 years prior to release.

=== Chianti DOCs ===
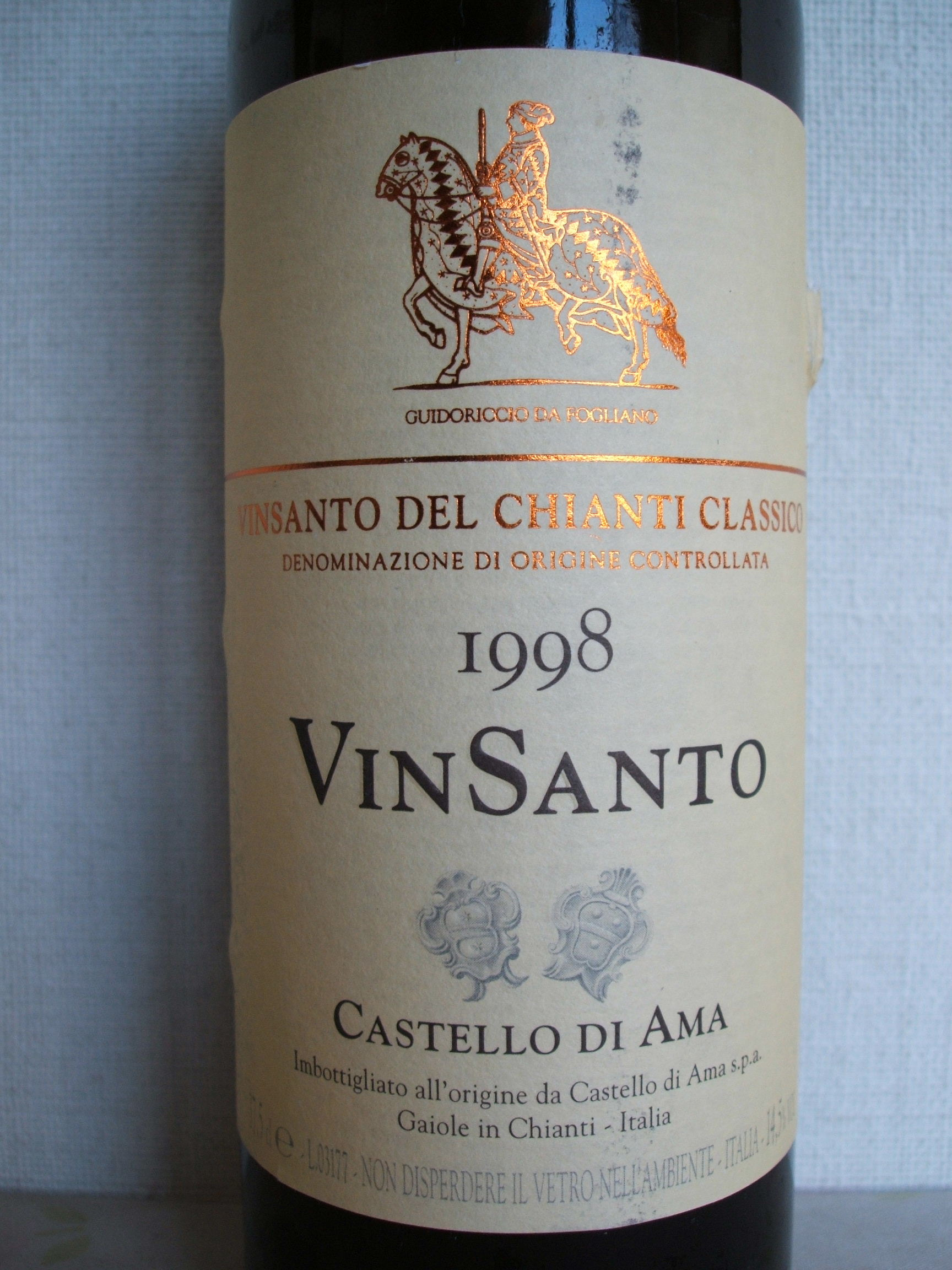
A bottle of Vin Santo Chianti Classico DOC by Castello di Ama

There are two main DOC regions that cover the production of Vin Santo in the Chianti zone. The Vin Santo del Chianti DOC overlaps with the entire Chianti zone and includes nearly every style and sweetness level of Vin Santo produced in Tuscany. Most of the Vin Santo that is sold on the international wine market is produced under this DOC designation. As with red Chianti wine, several village are permitted to add their names on the wine label as sub-zones. These sub-zones are Rufina, Montalbano, Colli-Fiorentini, Colline-Pisani, Colli-Aretini, Colli-Senesi and Montespertoli. White Vin Santo must have a minimum 16% alcohol level and is composed of at least a 70% blend of Trebbiano and Malvasia with other local white grape varieties permitted to make up the remaining 30%. The Occhio di Pernice style must have a minimum alcohol level of 17% and is composed of 50–100% Sangiovese with other local white or red grape varieties permitted to make up to 50% of the remaining amount. The wines are to be aged a minimum of 3 years prior to release with wines aged for at least 4 years eligible to be labelled as Riserva styles.

The Colli dell'Etruria Centrale DOC is located within the geographical boundaries of the Chiant zones this DOC is a "catch-all" designations for alternative styles of wines that would otherwise not qualify for anything above vino da tavola. There are three distinct styles of Vin Santo that can be produced under the Colli dell'Etruria Centrale DOC label-Occhio di Pernice, Abboccato and Amabile (also known as Secco). The first style, Occhio di Pernice, is a pale rosé style wine made from at least 50% Sangiovese with a mix of local red and white grape varieties permitted to fill in the remaining 50%. The wine must have a minimum alcohol level of at least 10.5% and be aged for at least 3 years prior to release. The Amabile and Abboccato styles related to their sweetness level with Abbocato designating a slightly sweet (or "off dry") style and Amabile designating a wine that is sweeter but not quite as sweet as something that would be labelled as Dolce. These wines must have a minimum alcohol level of 15% and be aged for at least 3 years prior to release. If a Vin Santo is aged for 4 years, it qualifies to be labelled as Riserva wine. Both the Amabile and Abboccato wines must be composed of at least a 70% blend of Trebbiano and Malvasia with local grape varieties permitted to fill in the remaining 30%.

=== Related DOCs ===
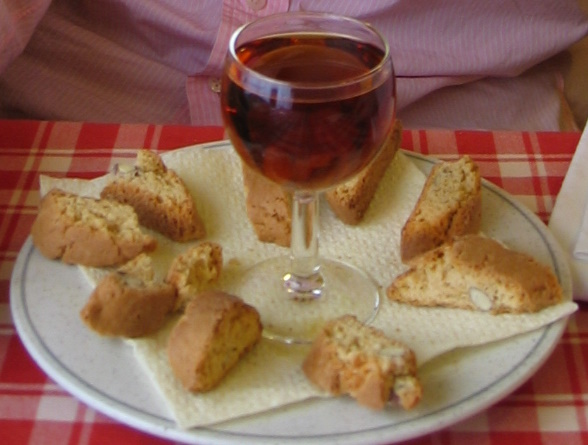
Vin Santo is served with dessert, generally traditional biscuits.

Offida DOC in Marche, includes 19 comuni within the region but only 2 are allowed to produce Vin Santo. The wine must have a minimal alcohol content of 12% and be aged for at least 3 and half years prior to release. The wine must be composed of at least 85% of Passerina with the remaining 15% coming from local white grape varieties. Trentino DOC is a large province wide DOC covering the whole autonomous province of Trento. The Vino Santo sub-zone (not to be confused with Vin Santo wine) covers the Valle dei Laghi area, using 100% Nosiola grapes air-dried for up to 6 months when they become affected by noble rot. Vinification takes up to 3 years to reach 12–13% abv. Most producers age the wine for 7–10 years but the minimum is 3 years.

== See also ==
Media related to Vin Santo at Wikimedia Commons

- List of dips
