= Biancame =

Variety of grape

Biancame is a white Italian wine grape variety that is grown in the Marche and Emilia-Romagna regions of Italy. Here it is an important component in the Denominazione di origine controllata (DOC) wines of Bianchello del Metauro and Colli di Rimini.

== History ==
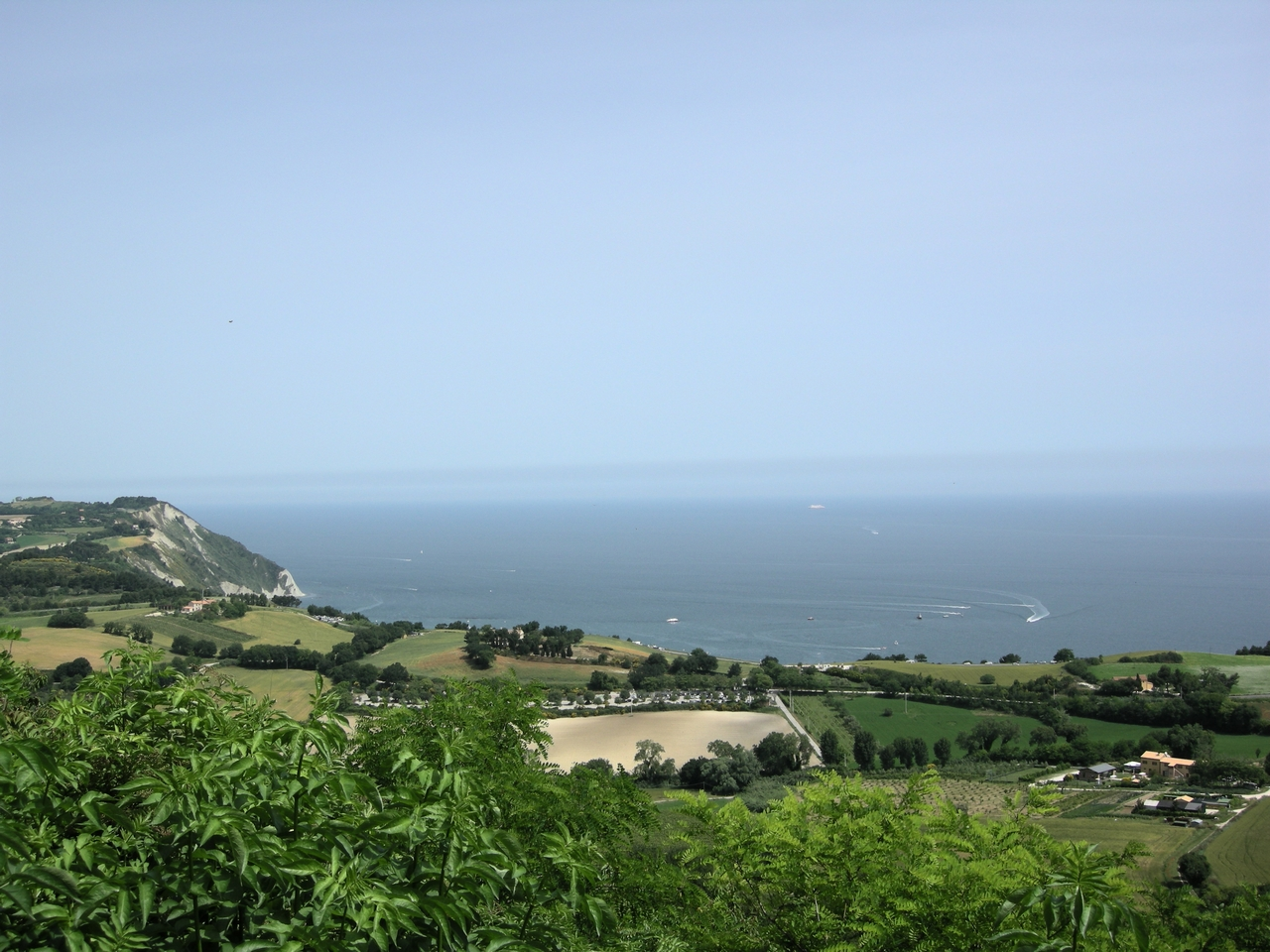
Vineyards near Ancona in the Marche region where Biancame is believed to have originated in.

Ampelographers believe that Biancame likely originated in the Marche region of east-central Italy. The origins of the name Biancame is not yet known but the grape may have also been known as Morbidella in the past and has been frequently confused with other grape varieties that share similar synonyms and features.

== Viticulture ==
Biancame is a mid to late-ripening grapevine that can be vigorous and prone to produce large canopies of leaves that need to be managed in the vineyard.

== Wine regions ==
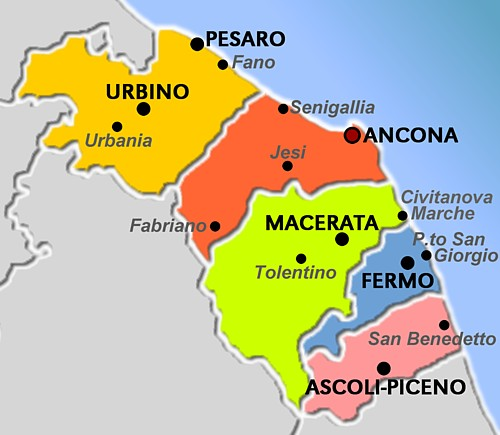
Today, most plantings of Biancame can be found in the provinces of Ancona, Ascoli Piceno and Pesaro and Urbino in Marche.

In 2000, there were 2,080 hectares (5,100 acres) of Biancame planted in Italy. The majority of plantings are found in the Marche provinces of Ancona, Ascoli Piceno and Pesaro and Urbino as well as the Emilia-Romagna province of Forlì-Cesena.

== Wines ==
According to Master of Wine Jancis Robinson, Biancame tends to produce delicate white wines with fruity flavors and floral aromas. The grape is the primary component in the Marche DOC wine of Bianchello del Metauro produced in the province Pesaro and Urbino. While the wine can be 100% varietal Biancame, up to 5% of Malvasia bianca Lunga (known locally as Malvasia Toscana), can also be included.

Likewise, Biancame can be a varietal or blending component in the white DOC wine of Colli di Rimini produced in the province of Rimini in Emilia-Romagna. Here Biancame must make up at least 85% of the blend with Pignoletto, Chardonnay, Riesling Italico, Sauvignon blanc, Pinot blanc and Müller-Thurgau permitted to collectively fill in the remaining 15%.

== Synonyms and confusion with other grapes ==
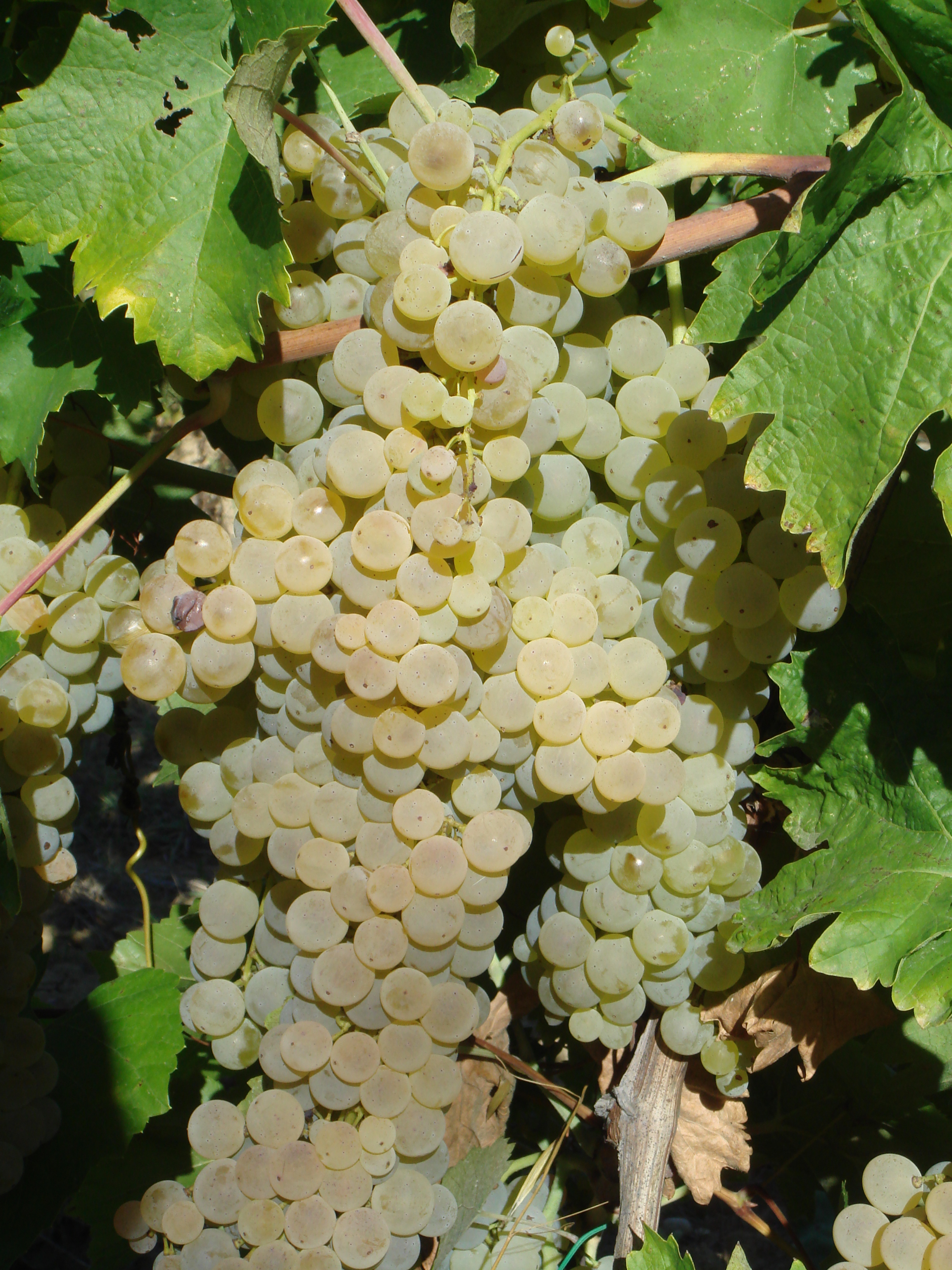
Due to both similarities in synonyms and appearance, Biancame is often confused for Trebbiano (pictured).

Over the years, several varieties have been known under the synonym of Biancame including Malvasia di Sardegna, Trebbiano Toscano and Albana. In addition to being confused with these varieties due to the naming similarities, Biancame has also been confused for the Marche grape Passerina as well as Trebbiano due to similarities in the grapevine's appearances.

While there are no official synonyms for the Biancame grape of Marche and Emilia-Romagna listed in the Vitis International Variety Catalogue (VIVC), wine experts Jancis Robinson, Julia Harding and José Vouillamoz note that Morbidella has been possibly used as a synonym for Biancame in the past.
