= Orvieto DOC =

Italian controlled wine origin in Umbria and Lazio

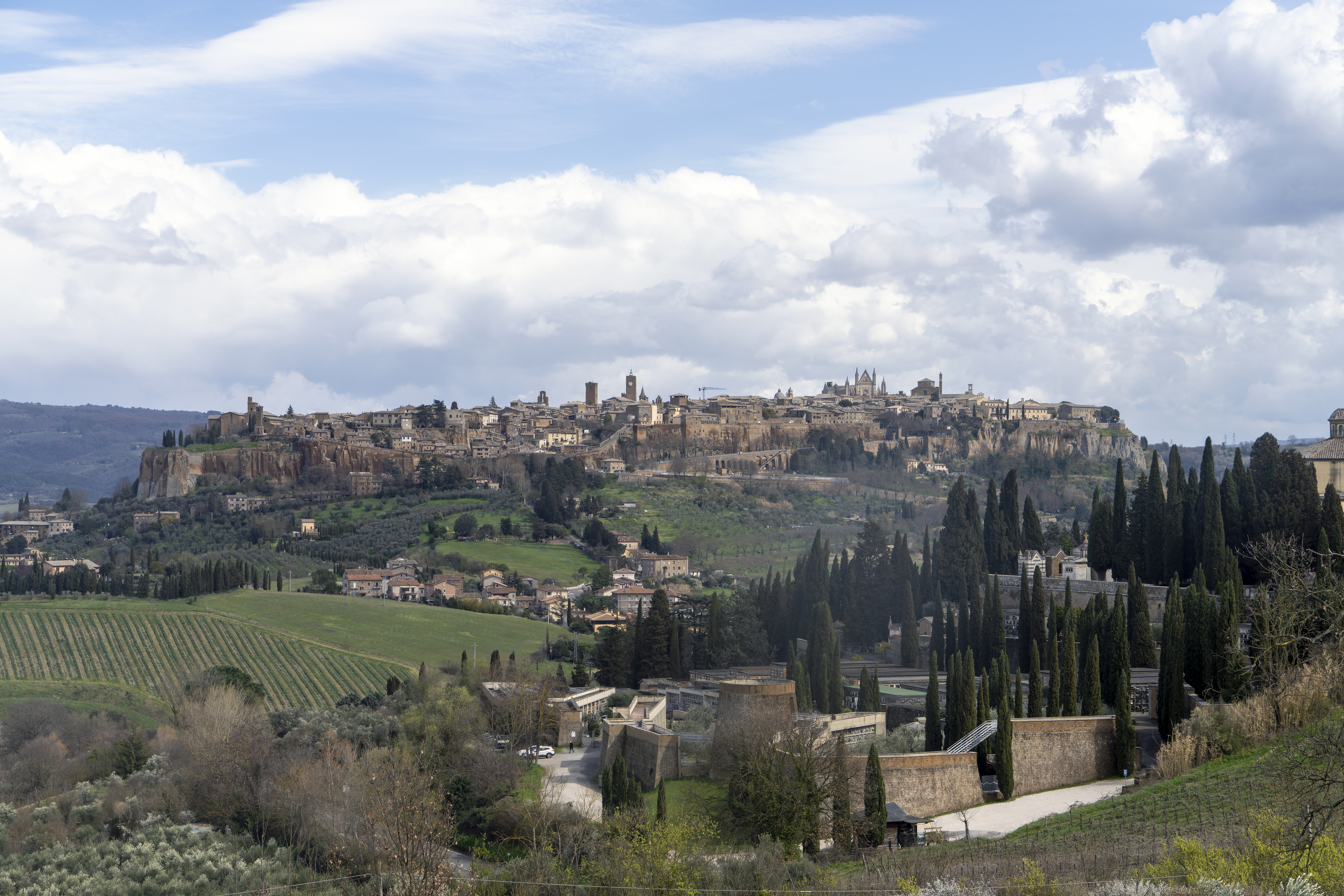
The comune of Orvieto

Orvieto is an Italian wine region located in Umbria and Lazio, centered on the comune of Orvieto. It is primarily known for its white wines made from a blend of mostly Grechetto and Trebbiano, which is sold under the Denominazione di origine controllata (DOC) Orvieto and Orvieto Classico. Blended red wine and eight varietal reds are sold under the Rosso Orvietano DOC. The region has been producing wine since the Middle Ages, when Orvieto wine was known as a sweet, golden-yellow wine. Today's white Orvieto is dry, but a semi-sweet style, known as Orvieto Abboccato, and dolce (sweet), are also produced in small quantities.

== Geography ==
The Orvieto zone is in the province of Terni in the south-western corner of Umbria. It extends southward into the Viterbo province of Lazio and north to the border between Terni and the province of Perugia. The Orvieto Classico region is characterised by tufa, limestone and volcanic soil.

== History ==
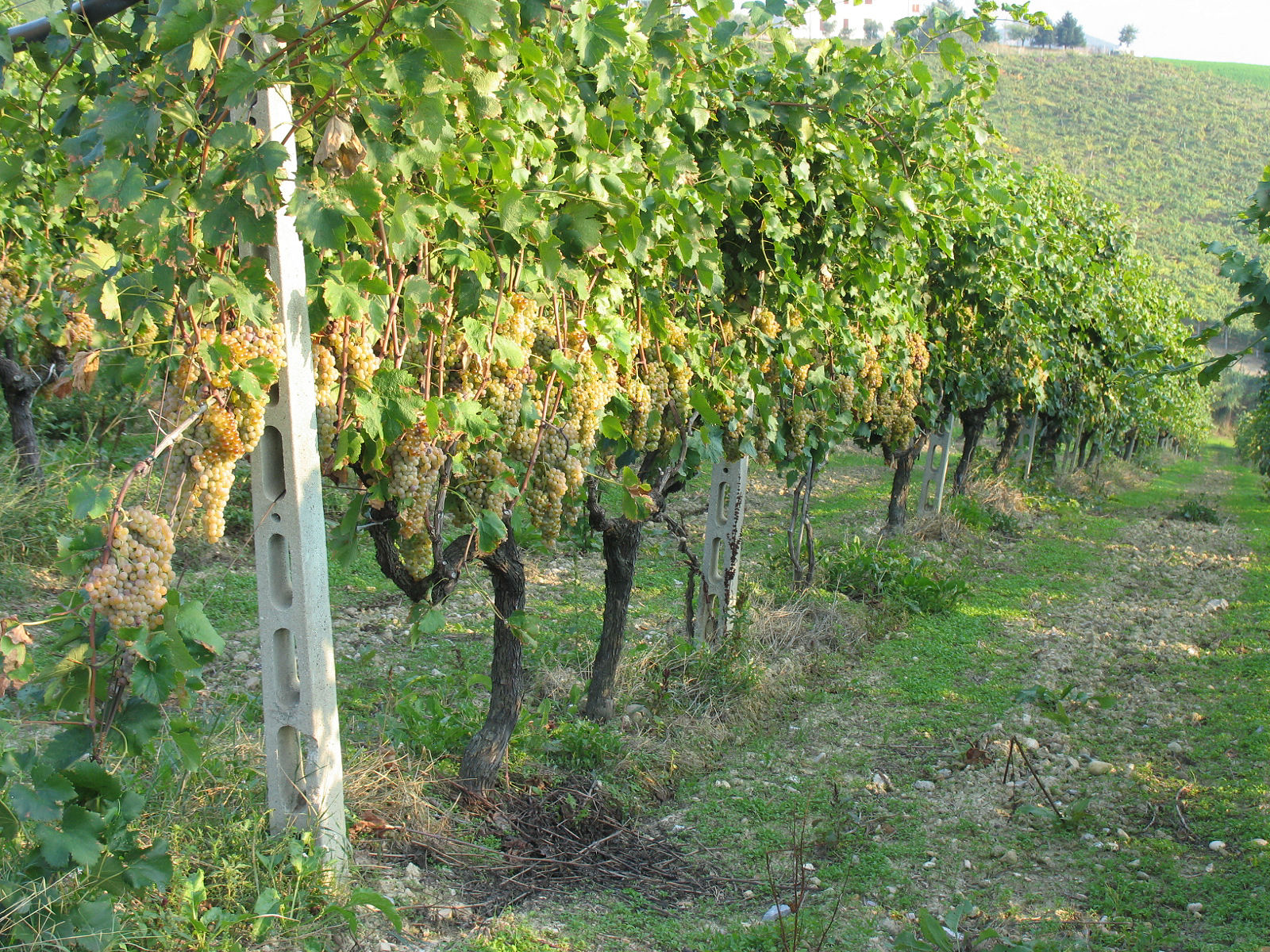
Trebbiano grapes

Viticulture was introduced to the Orvieto region by the early Etruscans, who carved out cellar-like caves from volcanic soil that could house wine production with long, cool fermentation and produced the type of sweet wine that was popular in the ancient world. From the Middle Ages to the mid-20th century, the Orvieto region was known for the sweet dessert wine made with the noble rot, Botrytis cinerea. Unlike most botrytized wine, such as Sauternes, where the grapes are introduced to the Botrytis cinerea fungus while they are on the vine, the grapes of Orvieto were exposed to the fungus after harvest, when they packed into crates and barrels and stored in humid grottoes carved out of the tufa stone. Made primarily from the Trebbiano sub-variety Procanico, which produces smaller berries than the Trebbiano used in Tuscan wines, these sweet wines were deep gold in color, described by the poet Gabriele d'Annunzio as "the sun of Italy in a bottle". While the production of fully botrytized wine is rare, in ideal vintage years some producers will make a sweet muffato from partially botrytized grapes.

== Wine ==
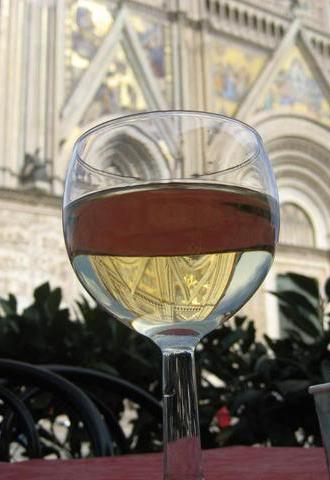
A glass of white Orvieto wine near the Duomo di Orvieto

White Orvieto is composed primarily of Grechetto and Trebbiano and a blend of Malvasia, Drupeggio, Verdello and Canaiolo bianco grapes. Grechetto is valued for the fruitiness and weight that it brings to the wine; some of the most highly rated examples of Orvieto have a high concentration of Grechetto. The wine today is radically different from the historical sweet Orvieto, with off-dry and sweet wines accounting for less than five percent of total production. In addition to the traditional grape varieties listed, some Orvieto producers have begun experimenting with non-DOC Vino da Tavola wines made from Riesling and Sauvignon blanc.

According to Joseph Bastianich and David Lynch, the Orvieto wine production tends to be divided into two camps: estates which make traditional neutral and Trebbiano-dominated wines, and estates which take advantage of the liberal DOC blending policy and use as much of other permitted grapes as possible. Under the Orvieto DOC regulations, wines may contain 40% to 60% Trebbiano Toscano, 15% to 25% Verdello, and up to 20% maximum of Grechetto, Canaiolo bianco (Drupeggio) and/or Malvasia Toscana for the remainder.

=== Rosso Orvietano ===
The Rosso Orvietano DOC covers the entire Orvieto zone and is used for the blended red wines made from Aleatico, Barbera, Cabernet Franc, Cabernet Sauvignon, Canaiolo, Cesanese, Ciliegiolo, Colorino, Dolcetto, Merlot, Montepulciano, Pinot nero and Sangiovese. Red varietal wines are also permitted under their DOC as long as they contain at least 70% of Aleatico, Cabernet Franc, Cabernet Sauvignon, Canaiolo, Ciliegiolo, Merlot, Pinot nero and Sangiovese. The advent of the Indicazione Geografica Tipica (IGT) classification has given Orvieto producers the ability to experiment with non-DOC wines and sell them under one of Umbria's IGT classifications.
