= Morro d'Alba =

- Comune
- Comune di Morro d'Alba
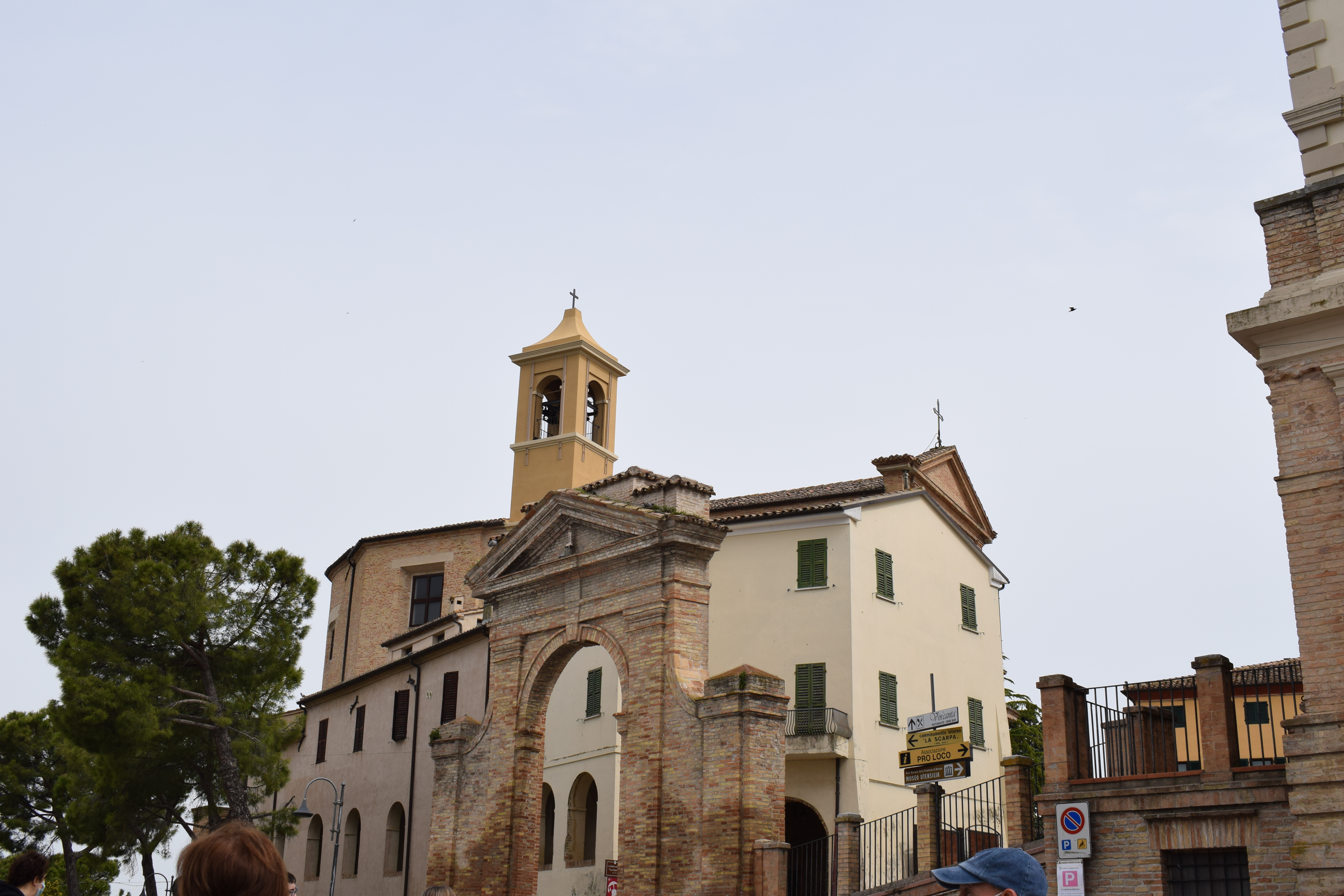
- The old town of Morro d'Alba

- Coat of arms

- Location within Italy Location within Marche
- Coordinates: 43°36′N 13°13′E
- Country: Italy
- Region: Marche
- Province: Ancona (AN)
- Frazioni: Santa Maria, Sant'Amico

Government
  - Mayor: Enrico Ciarimboli

Area
  - Total: 19.46 km^{2} (7.51 sq mi)
- Elevation: 199 m (653 ft)

Population (08 August 2025)
  - Total: 1,793
  - Density: 92.14/km^{2} (238.6/sq mi)
- Demonym: Morresi
- Time zone: UTC+1 (CET)
  - Summer (DST): UTC+2 (CEST)
- Postal code: 60030
- Dialing code: 0731
- Website: Official website

Morro d'Alba is a hilly Italian comune (municipality) in the province of Ancona (Marche region), located about 12 kilometres (7.5 mi) northwest of Jesi. It is known for giving its name to the DOC red wine Lacrima di Morro d'Alba.

Bordered by Belvedere Ostrense (AN), Monte San Vito (AN), San Marcello (AN), and Senigallia (AN), this medieval village is officially recognized as one of I Borghi più belli d'Italia. It sits nestled in the Marche countryside, in an area historically renowned for the abundant natural springs.

== See also ==
- Lacrima di Morro d'Alba
- Lacrima (grape)
