= Lacrima di Morro d'Alba =

Italian controlled red wine origin in Marche

Lacrima di Morro d'Alba, also known as Lacrima di Morro, is an Italian denominazione di origine controllata (DOC) red wine produced in the province of Ancona, made from the rare autochthonous Lacrima grape variety. The DOC was created in 1985 and it is one of the most important productions of the Marche region.

== History ==
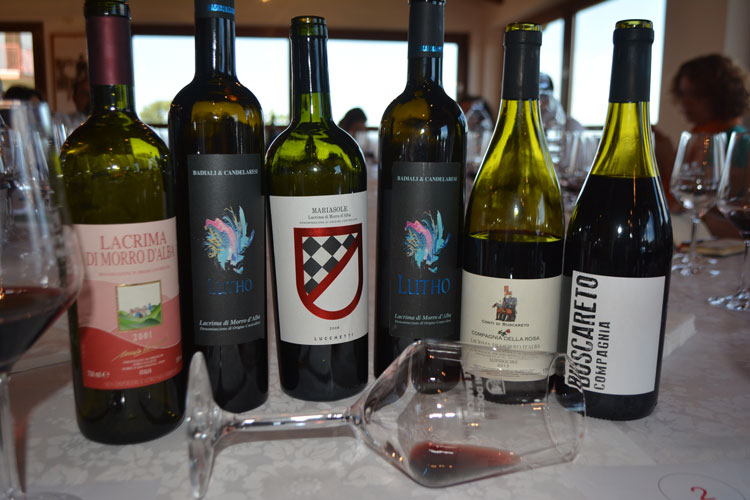
Bottles of Lacrima di Morro d'Alba red wine

The origins of Lacrima di Morro d'Alba are closely intertwined with those of its namesake grape variety. According to local tradition, the wine's history dates back to at least 1167: legend states that Frederick Barbarossa stayed at the Castle of Morro d'Alba during the Siege of Ancona and became an admirer of the beverage produced from the Lacrima grape, reportedly requisitioning local supplies for his court. Formal scientific documentation regarding the variety first appeared in the 19th century. These ampelographic records attributed the cultivar generically to the region of Marche, though they failed to identify a specific point of origin, which remains unknown to this day. Historically, this grape enjoyed a significantly wider distribution across the Italian Peninsula, particularly throughout the Middle Adriatic corridor. However, the cultivation area underwent a dramatic contraction during the 20th century. Due to extensive uprooting and the substitution of Lacrima with more high-yielding or international varieties—a trend that persisted until the early 1980s—the contemporary production zone is now highly restricted and localized almost exclusively within the province of Ancona.

== Geography and terroir ==
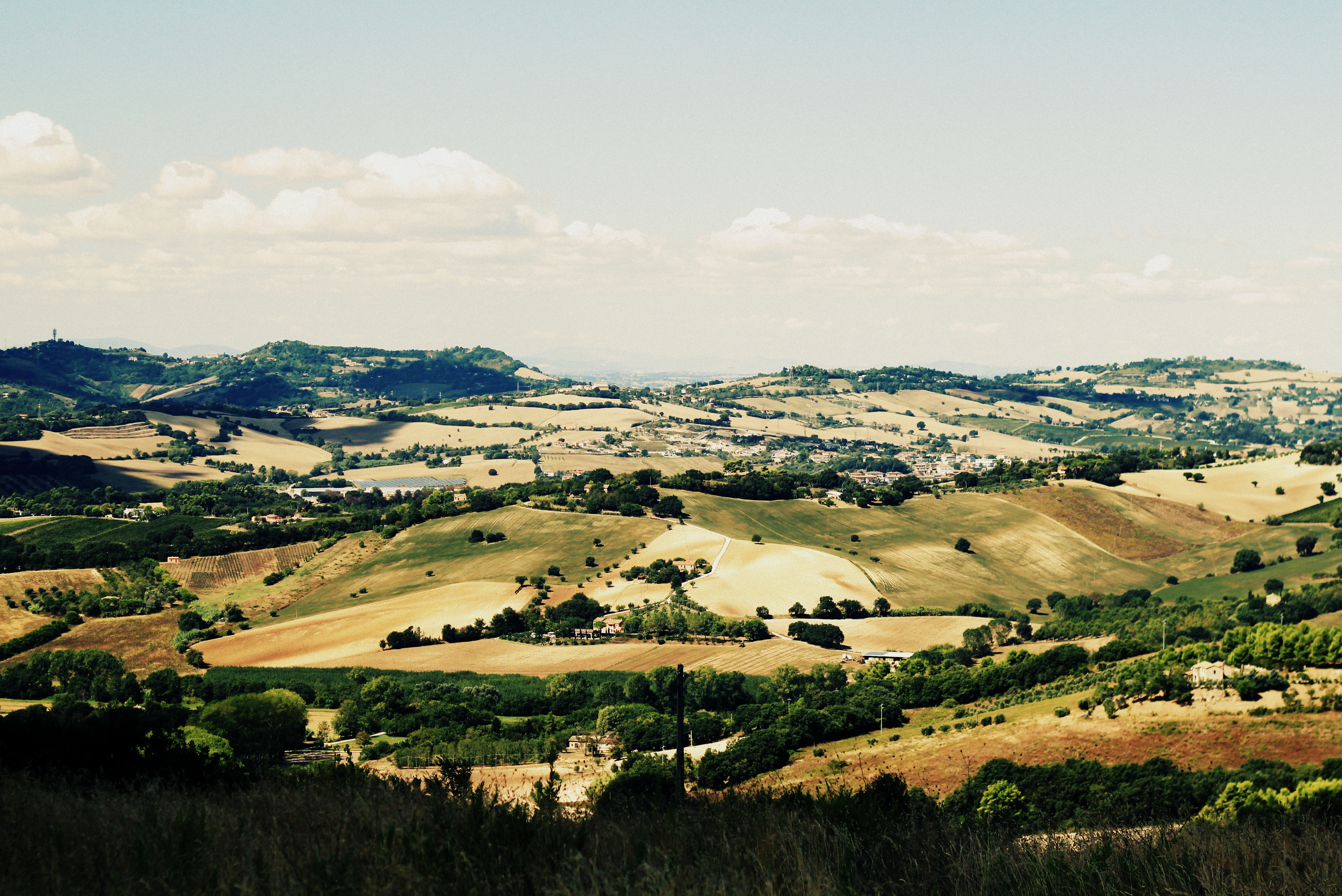
Typical agricultural landscape of the Ancona hinterland

The wine is produced exclusively in a small group of hilltop municipalities within the province of Ancona, in the central Italian region of Marche: Morro d'Alba, Monte San Vito, San Marcello, Belvedere Ostrense, Ostra, and Senigallia. In the case of Senigallia, production is restricted, excluding valley floors and slopes directly facing the sea. The boundaries of the denomination, located on average no more than 25 km from the Adriatic Sea, fall within a temperate climate zone, characterized by warm summers and annual precipitation ranging between 700 and 800 mm. The soils, situated at elevations between 150 and 250 meters above sea level, are notably deep and particularly rich in fine clays and limestone. These pedological conditions are considered ideal for high-quality viticulture, as they allow for optimal water retention and mineral complexity in the grapes.

== The Lacrima grape ==
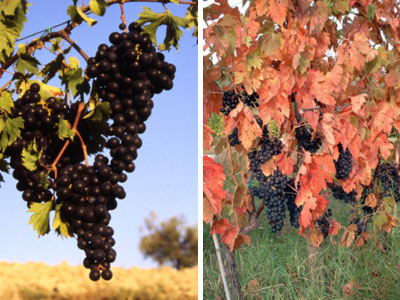
Lacrima grape

Lacrima is an ancient autochthonous grape, seldom found outside the anconetano, and is genetically related to Aleatico and Muscat Blanc. The wine is produced by only a limited number of estates. The most widely accepted etymology of the name, which was a subject of past debate, is believed to derive from a specific physiological trait of the grape: at peak maturity, the berry's skin tends to rupture, exuding small droplets of juice that resemble tears (lacrime in Italian).

== DOC regulations ==
The production process for Lacrima di Morro d'Alba DOC is governed by strict regulations designed to preserve the integrity of the grape's aromatic heritage. According to the disciplinare di produzione, the ampelographic base must consist of at least 85% Lacrima grapes. The remaining 15% may include non-aromatic black grapes authorized for cultivation within the Marche region. The planting density must not fall below 2,200 vines per hectare, with a maximum permitted grape yield of 10 tonnes per hectare. These parameters ensure an optimal concentration of volatile compounds and anthocyanins within the berries. Due to the fragility of the skins and the high terpene content of the variety, vinification is primarily conducted "in red" using techniques aimed at protecting the primary olfactory profile: fermentation and maceration occur at controlled temperatures (generally not exceeding 22–25°C) to extract floral notes of rose and violet while avoiding the excessive extraction of harsh tannins, which are naturally low in this cultivar. Stainless steel tanks are preferred to maintain aromatic freshness, although the use of wood barrels is permitted for more structured versions.

The designation includes three main variants, distinguished by aging periods and chemical-physical characteristics:

- Base: Characterized by freshness and immediate drinkability; it must have a minimum alcohol content of 11.50% vol.
- Superiore: Requires a more rigorous selection and a longer maturation period. It cannot be released for consumption before 1 September of the year following the harvest and must reach a minimum alcohol content of 12.50% vol.
- Passito: Obtained from grapes subjected to natural or controlled drying (appassimento); it features a significant sugar concentration and a minimum total alcohol content of 15.00% vol.

The minimum non-reducing extract (dry extract) is set at 20.0 g/l for the base version and 22.0 g/l for the Superiore, reflecting the structure and density of the finished product.

According to Joseph Bastianich, Lacrima di Morro d'Alba is a red wine similar to Dolcetto that may, in the future, reach the same international importance as more established national wines.

== Organoleptic characteristics ==
Lacrima di Morro d'Alba stands out on the international wine scene for its unique sensory profile, defined as "semi-aromatic". It is characterized by a prominent floral imprint and a balanced phenolic structure. The wine exhibits a deep ruby red color, with evident and persistent purple hues. The chromatic intensity is high, due to the abundance of anthocyanins found in the grape skins, which often give the liquid a visual density that is nearly opaque. Upon olfactory examination, Lacrima expresses a bouquet of extreme vigor and clarity. The dominant notes are attributable to flowers, specifically rose (thanks to the abundant geraniol content) and violet, followed by fruity hints of forest berries such as wild strawberry, cherry, and raspberry. In certain selections or the Superiore classification, more complex nuances of marasca cherry, balsamic notes, and occasionally blackcurrant emerge. On the palate, the wine is medium-bodied with notable smoothness. The tannins are generally fine and silky, never excessively aggressive. The acidity is well-balanced, contributing to an easy-drinking character, while the finish is characterized by a long aromatic persistence that mirrors the floral sensations perceived on the nose.

== See also ==
- Lacrima (grape)
- Morro d'Alba
