= Falerio dei Colli Ascolani =

Italian controlled white wine origin in Marche

Falerio dei Colli Ascolani is a denominazione di origine controllata white wine made in the Italian region of Marche. The DOC was created in 1975.

== Geography ==
The region lies on the eastern coast of Italy, encompassing the towns of Civitanova Marche, San Benedetto del Tronto, and Ascoli Piceno. The wine region is one of the southernmost DOCs in the Marche.

== History ==
The name of the DOC can be traced back to Roman times, and is named after the ancient Roman city of Faleria, which is now the modern day commune of Falerone.

== The Passerina and Pecorino grapes ==
Falerio dei Colli Ascolani, like many wines of the Marche, is unique in its use of rare local Italian varietals that are seldom found anywhere else, here the Passerina and Pecorino grape varietals. The blend requires a minimum of 20% and a maximum of 50% Trebbiano Toscano, 10% to 30% Passerina, 10% to 30% Pecorino and up to 20% other white varietals.
