= Maceratino =

Variety of grape

- Grape (Vitis)
- Color of berry skin: White
- Species: Vitis vinifera
- Origin: Italy
- VIVC number: 7023

Maceratino is a white Italian wine grape variety that is grown predominantly in the Marche along the Adriatic coast of Italy. Ampelographers believe the grape may have some relation to Greco and Verdicchio, as evidence by the several overlapping synonyms, but no definitive link has been proven. For most of the 20th century, and into the 21st century, plantings of Maceratino have been declining and becoming increasingly rare.

White wines from Colli Maceratesi DOC must use at least 80 per cent Maceratino in the blend.

== Synonyms ==
Various synonyms have been used to describe Maceratino and its wines, including Aribona, Bianchetta, Bianchetta Montecchiese, Greco, Greco ad acini piccoli, Greco bianco delle Marche, Greco Castellano, Greco delle Marche, Greco Fino, Greco Maceratino, Greco Montecchiese, Maceratese, Matelicano, Montecchiese, Ribona, Uva Stretta, Verdicchio Marina, Verdicchio Marino, Verdicchio Sirolese and Verdicchio Tirolese.
