= Verdello (grape) =

Variety of grape

Verdello is a white Italian wine grape variety that is grown mostly in the Umbria region of central Italy where it plays a minor role as a blending grape in several Denominazione di Origine Controllata (DOC) wines, including Orvieto. Despite similarities in their names, the Italian Verdello grape has no close genetic relationship with the Portuguese wine grape Verdelho that is grown on the islands of Madeira and Azores. However, like the Portuguese grape, Verdello's name likely comes from the dark green color of its berries before veraison.

== History ==
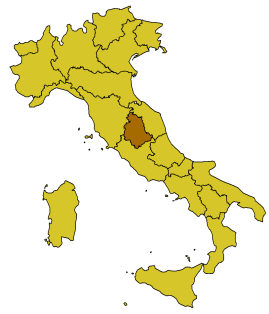
The Umbria region of central Italy where Verdello has been growing since at least the late 19th century.

Ampelographers believe that Verdello is indigenous to the Umbria region where it has been recorded growing in the Orvieto region since at least 1894. The grape's name is likely derived from the green color of the hard, immature berries throughout the growing season before the period of veraison.

Despite the similarities in their names, Verdello has no known relationship with the Portuguese wine grape Verdelho. In Spain, the grape called Verdello is in fact the Portuguese Verdelho.

== Viticulture ==
Verdello is a late-ripening grape variety that tends to maintain very high acidity levels throughout harvest. The grape tends to have moderate resistance to the viticultural hazard of downy mildew but is much more sensitive to infection from botrytis bunch rot and powdery mildew.

== Wine regions ==
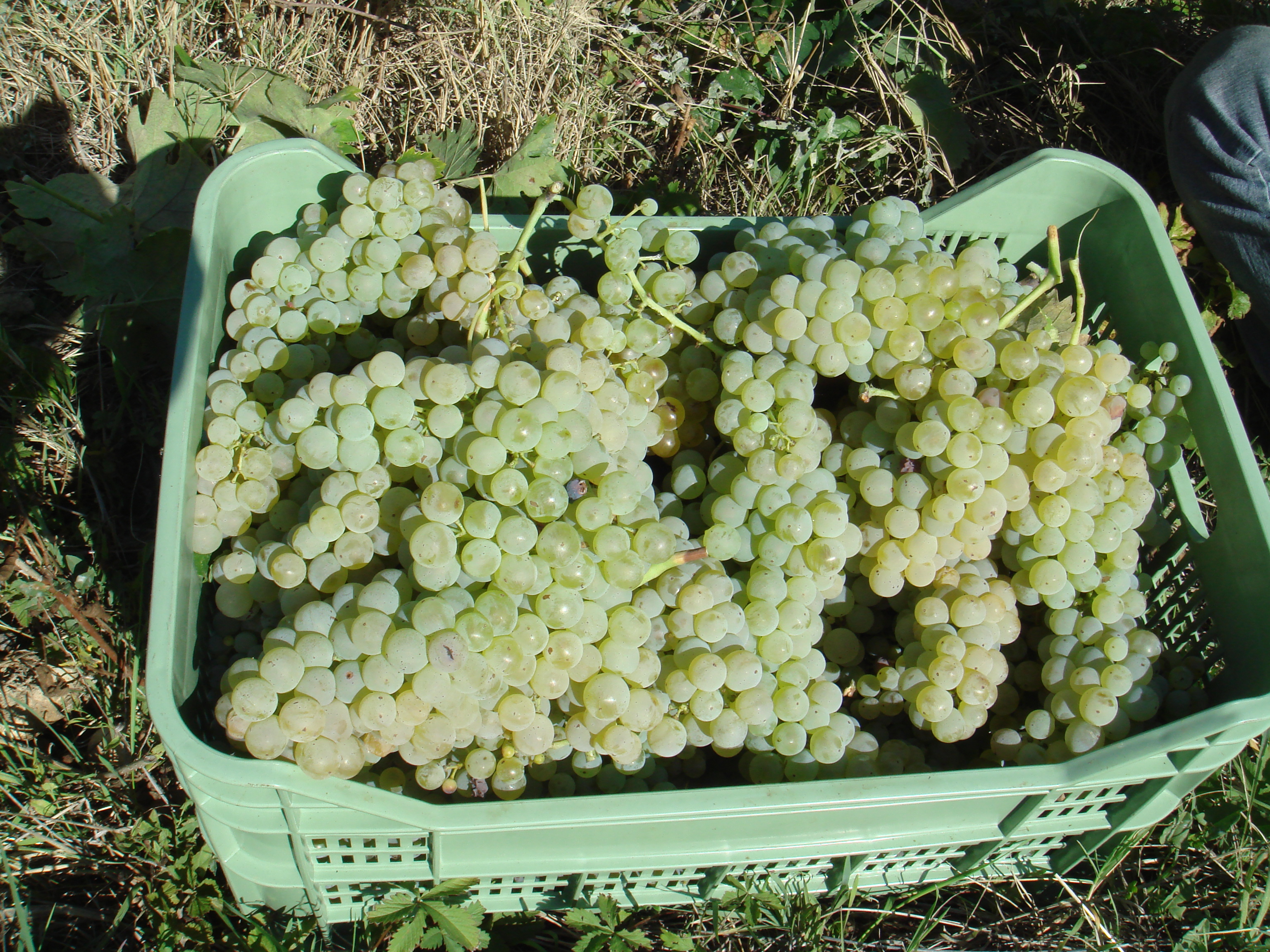
In both Umbria and Tuscany, Verdello is usually blended with Trebbiano (pictured).

In 2000, there were 678 hectares (1,680 acres) of Verdello planted in Italy which was nearly a 50% drop from planting totals in 1970. The vast majority of these plantings are found in the Umbria region though there are some isolated plantings in Tuscany where the grape is a permitted variety in the Bianco di Pitigliano DOC where it is blended with Trebbiano. In Umbria, the grape is also often blended with Trebbiano and is used as a minor blending variety, contributing acidity, to the Colli Amerini DOC and the Indicazione Geografica Tipica (IGT) wines of the region. It is also sometimes used as part of the pass for traditional method sparkling wine.

In the Orvieto DOC, the grape is a minor blending component (up to a maximum of 20-30% depending on the rest of the blend) in the white wine of the region that is based mostly on Trebbiano and Grechetto.

== Synonyms ==
Over the years, Verdello has also been known under the synonym Verdetto.
