= Lacrima (grape) =

Variety of grape

- Grape (Vitis)
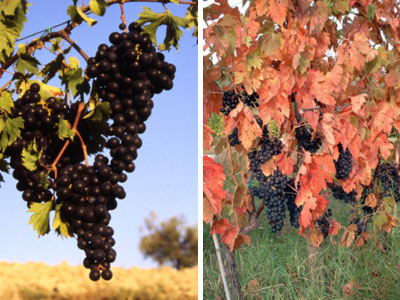
- Lacrima grapes
- Color of berry skin: Black
- Species: Vitis vinifera
- Origin: Italy
- Notable regions: Marche
- Notable wines: Lacrima di Morro d'Alba
- VIVC number: 6618

Lacrima is a rare, semi-aromatic red wine grape variety native to the Marche region of central Italy. It is grown almost exclusively within the Lacrima di Morro d'Alba DOC area, specifically around the municipality of Morro d'Alba in the province of Ancona. The name (meaning "tear" in Italian) derives from its thick but fragile skin, which tends to crack, allowing tear-like drops of juice to "weep" from the berry. Lacrima is notoriously difficult to cultivate and susceptible to disease. After facing near-extinction in the 20th century, the cultivar was revived and granted DOC status in 1985. The grape produces deeply pigmented, purple-hued wines renowned for their intense aromatic profile, featuring characteristic notes of violet and rose petals. This distinctive floral scent is attributed to a high concentration of the terpene geraniol. Typically low in tannins, Lacrima wine is generally best consumed young.

== Genetics ==
Genetic analysis of the germplasm conducted in 2021 revealed an ancestral link to Aleatico, a semi-aromatic grape variety of Tuscan origin, which is itself a descendant of Muscat Blanc. Lacrima is believed to be the result of a spontaneous cross between Aleatico and an ancient, now-extinct grape variety known as Nera Rada.

== See also ==
- Lacrima di Morro d'Alba
- List of Italian grape varieties
- Morro d'Alba
