= Passerina (grape) =

Variety of grape

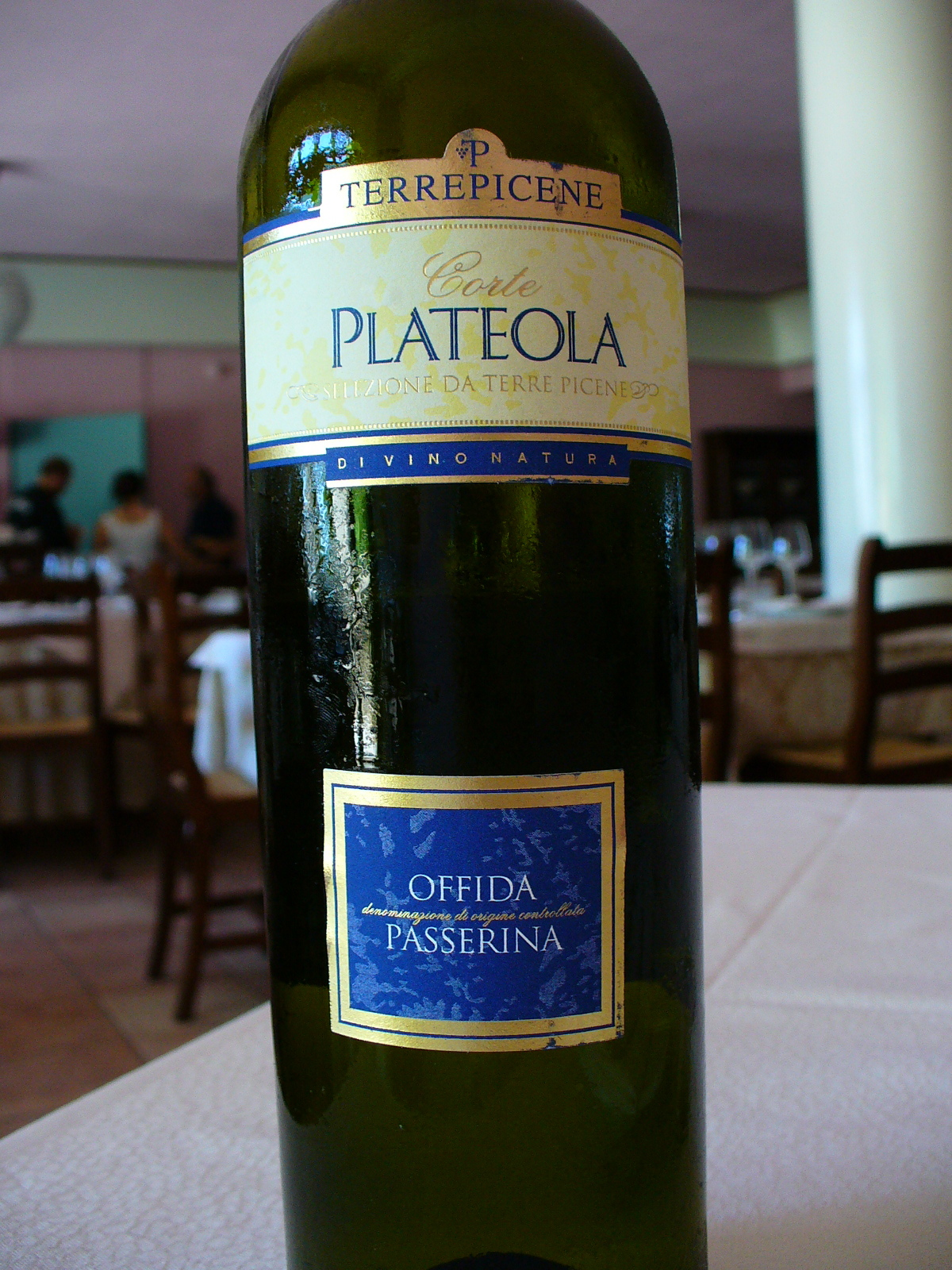
A bottle of Passerina from the Offida DOC in the Marche

Passerina is both a rare local white grape that is found in the Italian region of Marche, and a DOC for wines of the same name. Many researchers have studied its identity, so to boast an extensive bibliography and a high number of citations of the grapes on the most famous treatises of ampelography. However, its origins remain uncertain. Known by various names, such as "Pagadebito Gentile", "Campolese" and "Uva Passera", the term "Passerina" is attributed to those grapes that have small berries often devoid of seeds. Passerina is used in some Marche wine blends, including the DOC Falerio dei Colli Ascolani.

== Grape qualities ==
Passerina has large berries, high yields and a long ripening period. It makes appealing wines with clear, focused fruit.
