= Grechetto =

Variety of grape

- Grape (Vitis)
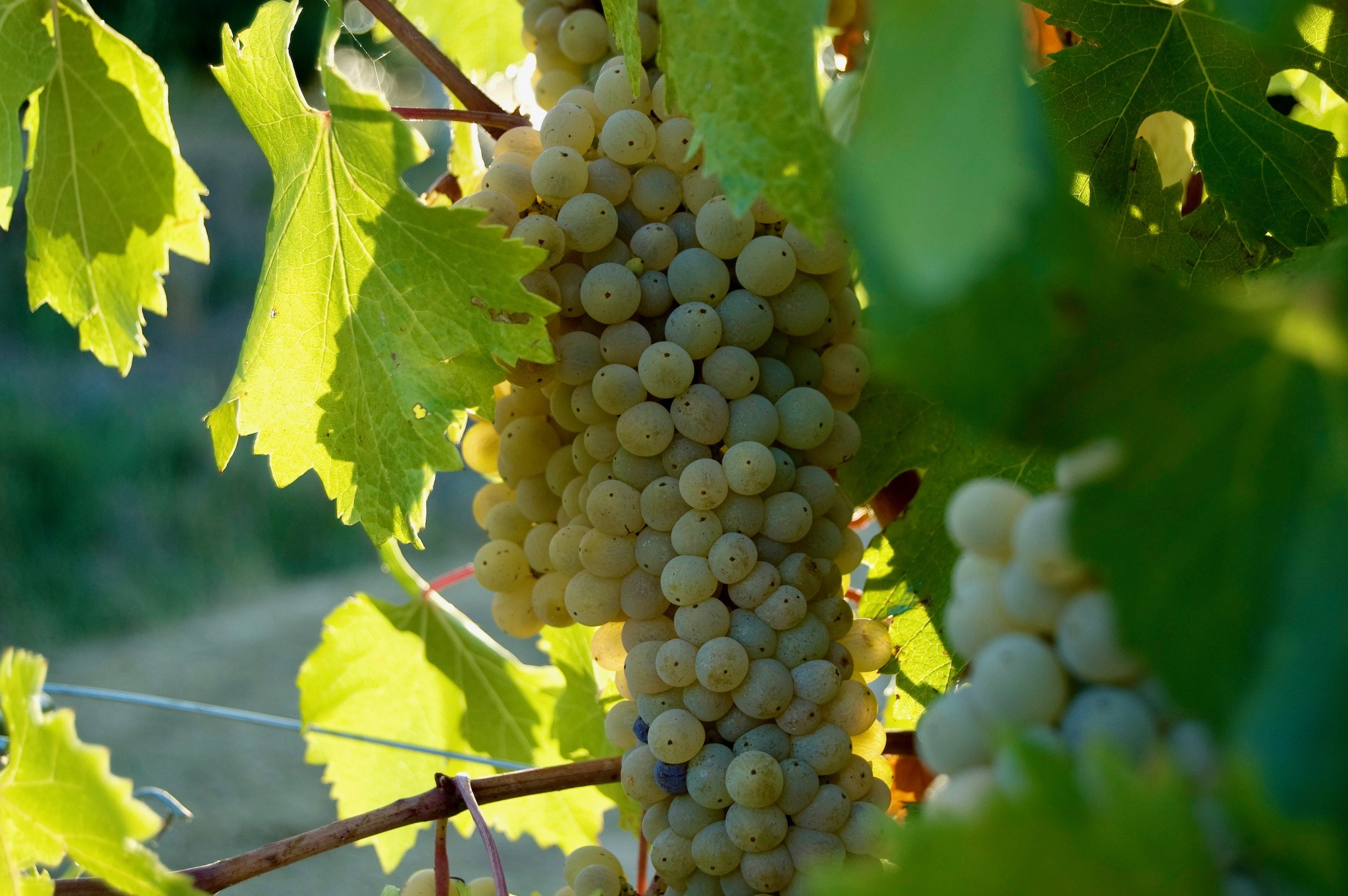
- Grechetto di Todi grapes
- Color of berry skin: Blanc
- Species: Vitis vinifera
- Also called: see list of synonyms
- Origin: Greece
- Notable regions: Italy
- Notable wines: Orvieto
- VIVC number: 4966

Grechetto (Italian pronunciation: [ɡreˈketto]) or Grechetto bianco is a white Italian wine grape variety of Greek origins. The grape is planted throughout central Italy, particularly in the Umbria region where it is used in the Denominazione di origine controllata (DOC) wine Orvieto and Denominazione di origine controllata (DOC) wine Valdichiana Toscana. It is primarily a blending grape, though some varietal wine is also produced. Grechetto is commonly blended with Chardonnay, Malvasia, Trebbiano and Verdello. The grape's thick skin provides good resistance to downy mildew which can attack the grape late in the harvest season. This makes Grechetto a suitable blending grape in the production of Vin Santo.

== Wine regions ==
In Italy, the Grechetto grape is found in DOCs of the central region-most notably Umbria's Orvieto and Tuscany Foiano region as well as the DOCs Valdichiana Toscana, DOCs of Torgiano and Colli Martani. The grape has been developing more of a presence in the area as winemakers are finding more potential in the grape than in the other main Umbria white grape varieties-Drupeggio and Trebbiano. In Lazio, the grape is found in the Cervaro region where the Antinori family has actively promoted its Cervaro blend of Grechetto and Chardonnay.

== Viticulture and winemaking ==
The thick skin of Grechetto grapes allows the grape to be harvested late with high sugar levels. This works well in the production of dessert wines. There are at least two sub-varieties of Grechetto-Grechetto di Todi and Grechetto Spoletino with the former being more widely planted in the area. The Grechetto vine is low yielding and able to produce concentrated flavors. The grape is primarily used as a blending grape where it adds richness and structure to the wines. It is most often blended with Chardonnay, Trebbiano, Malvasia and Verdello. In Umbria, Grechetto can add herbal and nutty flavors to the wine.

== Synonyms ==
Grechetto is also known under the synonyms Greca del Piemonte, Grecherello, Grechetto bianco, Grechetto di Todi, Grechetto Nostrale, Greco, Greco bianco di Perugia, Greco Gentile, Greco Spoletino, Montanarino Bianco, Montanaro, Occhietto, Pignoletto, Pistillo, Pizzinculo, Pocinculo, Pulce, Pulcincolo, Pulcinculo bianco, Pulcinculu, Pulcinella, Stroppa Volpe, Strozza Volpe, Strozzavolpe, and Uva di San Marino.

Despite having a synonym with a similar name, the grape is of no relation to the Greco bianco grape of the Calabria region.
