= Carmignano DOCG =

Italian wine region

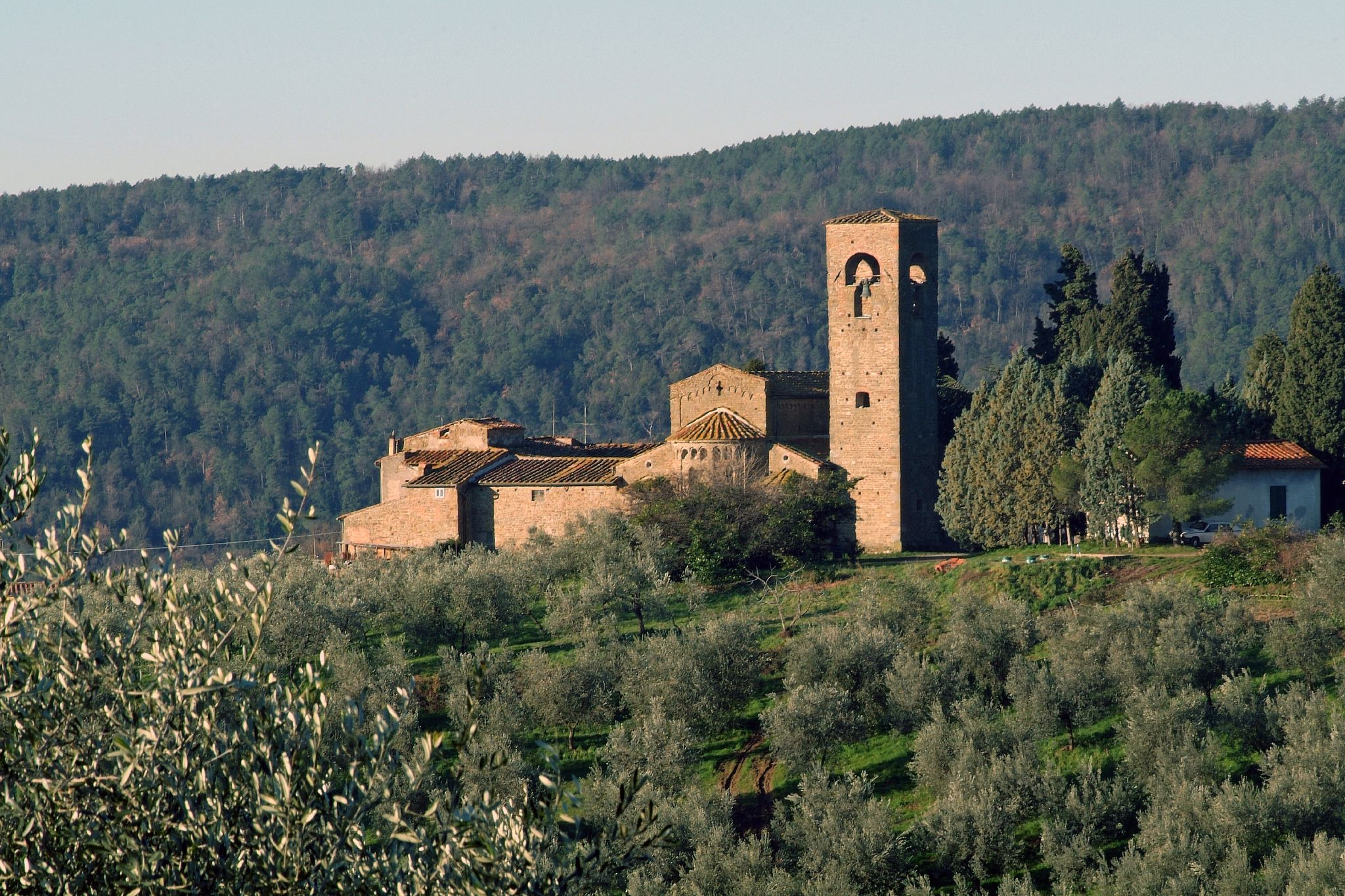
Carmignano, Tuscany

Carmignano is an Italian wine region located in the Tuscany region and centered on the city of Carmignano, near Prato and about 10 miles (16 kilometers) northwest of Florence. Noted for the quality of its wines since the Middle Ages, Carmignano was identified by Cosimo III de' Medici, Grand Duke of Tuscany as one of the superior wine producing areas of Tuscany and granted special legal protections in 1716. In the 1800s, the producers of the Carmignano region developed a tradition of blending Sangiovese with Cabernet Sauvignon, long before the practice became popularized by the "Super Tuscan" of the late 20th century. In 1975, the region was awarded Denominazione di origine controllata (DOC) status and subsequently promoted to Denominazione di Origine Controllata e Garantita (DOCG) status in 1990 (retroactive to the 1988 vintage). Today Carmignano has approximately 270 acres (110 ha) planted, producing nearly 71,500 gallons ( 2,700 hectoliters) of DOCG designated wine a year.

== History ==
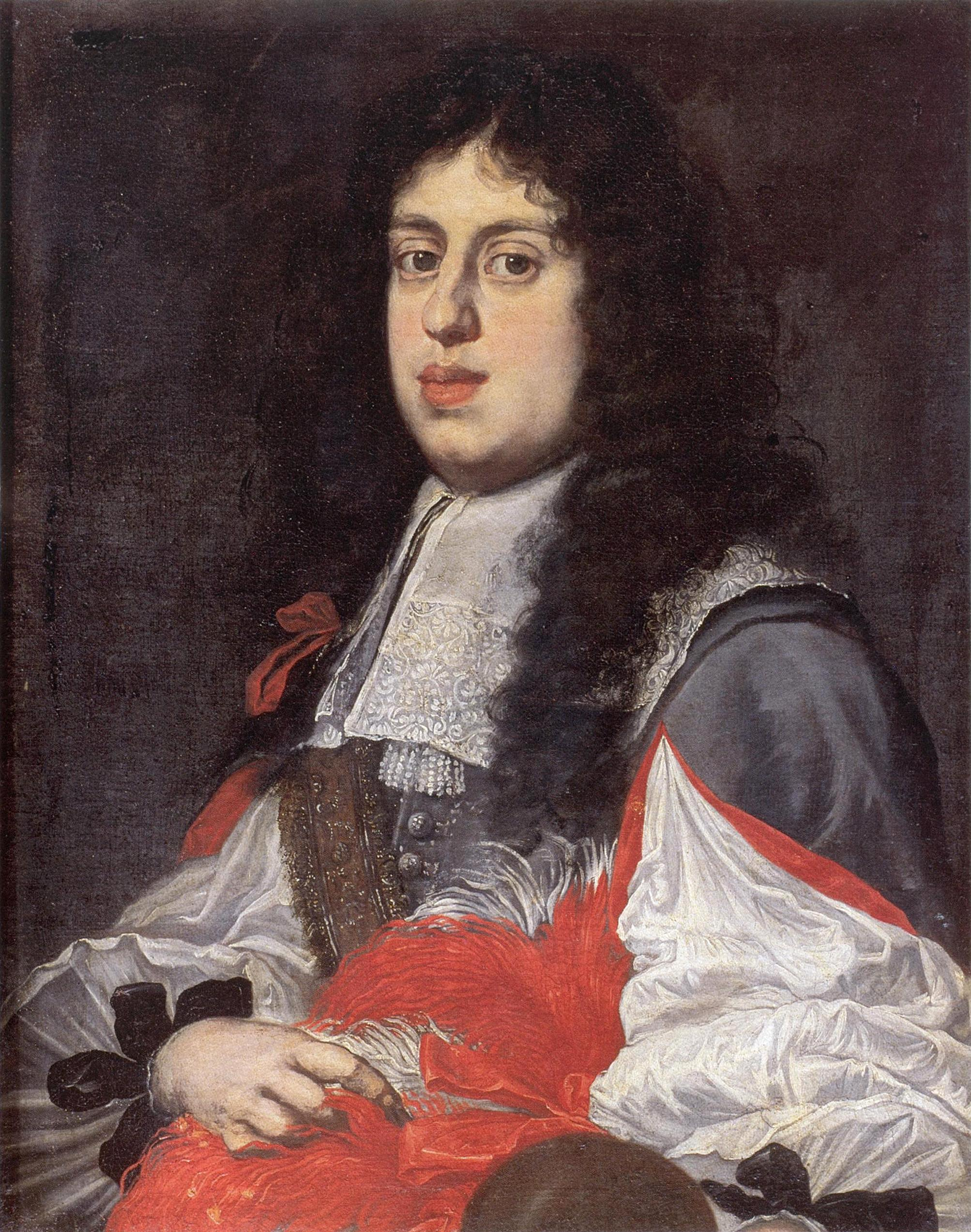
The 1716 edict by Cosimo III de' Medici, Grand Duke of Tuscany gave legal recognition to the wines of Carmignano.

Wine has been produced in the Carmignano region since Roman times. During the Middle Ages, the area was widely reputed for the quality of its wines, something that the local ruling Medici would take pride in during the centuries that followed. In 1716, the Grand Duke of Tuscany, Cosimo III de' Medici issued an edict identify four areas of Tuscany that produced the highest quality wine in the area. Carmignano was one of these areas and was given legal protection that prohibited other region from using the name "Carmignano" for their wines. The reputation of Carmignano continued to grow with Queen Anne of Great Britain requesting regular shipments of the wine. The wines were similarly praised in the 18th and 19th century writings of Giovanni Cosimo Villifranchi and Cosimo Ridolfi.

In 1932, the Dalmasso Commission (in establishing an early precursor to the Denominazione di origine controllata system) officially grouped Carmignano with the Chianti sub-zone of Chianti Montalbano. This was because of the proximity of the two regions and similarity in altitudes and annually yearly temperature. But the Carmignano region produced distinctly different wines from Chianti due, in part, to the tradition of including Cabernet Sauvignon in the blend with Sangiovese. While some theories suggest that this practice dates back to the time of the Medici (with those early vines subsequently being wiped out during the phylloxera epidemic), the practice became more common during the 20th century. Vine cuttings of Cabernet from Château Lafite Rothschild in Bordeaux were imported and by 1975 Carmignano was the first DOC to be awarded official sanctioning for the use of Cabernet in the blend. While the early "Super Tuscans" of the late 20th century which included Sangiovese-Cabernet blends had to be relegated to the lowly vino da tavola or "table wine" designation, DOC (and later DOCG) Carmignano wine was being produced with full legal sanctioning.

== DOCG regulations ==
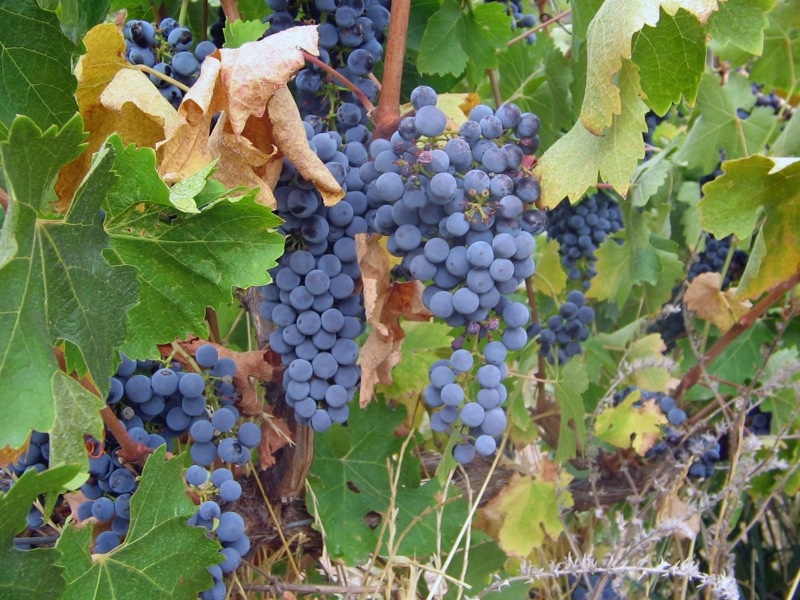
The Carmignano region was the first Tuscan DOC to officially sanction the use of blending Cabernet Sauvignon (pictured) with Sangiovese.

The Carmignano DOCG zones covers roughly 270 acres (110 ha) of planted land producing nearly 71,500 gallons (2,700 hl) of DOCG wine a year. Current DOCG regulations mandate that Sangiovese must constitute at least 50% of the blend, allowing up to 10–20% Cabernet Sauvignon or Cabernet Franc, up to 20% Canaiolo Nero, up to 5% Mammolo and Colorino as well as up to 10% white grape varieties like Trebbiano or Malvasia to make up the rest of the blend. If the wine is aged for at least 3 years prior to release, the wine can qualify for a Riserva designation. A separate DOC, known as Barco Reale was established for younger or "declassified" Carmignano DOCG wines. The Carmignano DOC still exists but is now used for Vin Santo and rosato wines. One unique Carmignano DOC wine is a rosé Vin Santo known as Occhio di Pernice (or "eye of the partridge") similar to the French Oeil de Perdrix.

== Viticulture ==
The Carmignano region, located 10 miles (16 km) northwest of Florence, is located on a series of low-lying hills at altitudes between 160–650 feet (50–200 meters) above sea level.

== Winemaking and styles ==
The low altitude of the region produces Sangiovese-based wines with lower acidity and more pronounced tannins than those associated with other Tuscan wine regions such as Chianti Classico. In the late 20th century, modern winemakers begun experimenting with the use of oak barrel aging. Carmignano wines are generally medium bodied with the Cabernet portion of the blend giving the wines some chocolate notes to the fruit and some aging potential.
