= Abrusco =

Variety of grape

Abrusco is a red Italian wine grape variety grown primarily in the Tuscany region where it is a minor blending component permitted in the wines of Chianti. The grape has long history in the region and was mentioned in 1600, under its synonyms Abrostino and Colore, in the posthumously published work by Italian agronomist Giovan Vettorio Soderini Trattato della coltivazione delle viti, e del frutto che se ne può cavare. There Soderini notes that the grape was often used to add deeper, more red color to Tuscan wines.

The variety is considered quite rare and is close to extinction with only 6 hectares (15 acres) of the grape variety reported in the 2000 Italian census. The Tuscan producer Le Tre Stelle has worked to keep the variety still viable, producing a limited production Indicazione geografica tipica (IGT) wine made of 100% Abrusco from 20 vines that were discovered growing among other varieties in an old vineyard owned by the winery. Another Tuscan producer Tuscan Soul winery is also working with the centre of research and development for Tuscany to produce wines of 100% Abrusco from 0.2 hectares of land on their estate in Cetona, Siena.

== Viticulture and winemaking ==
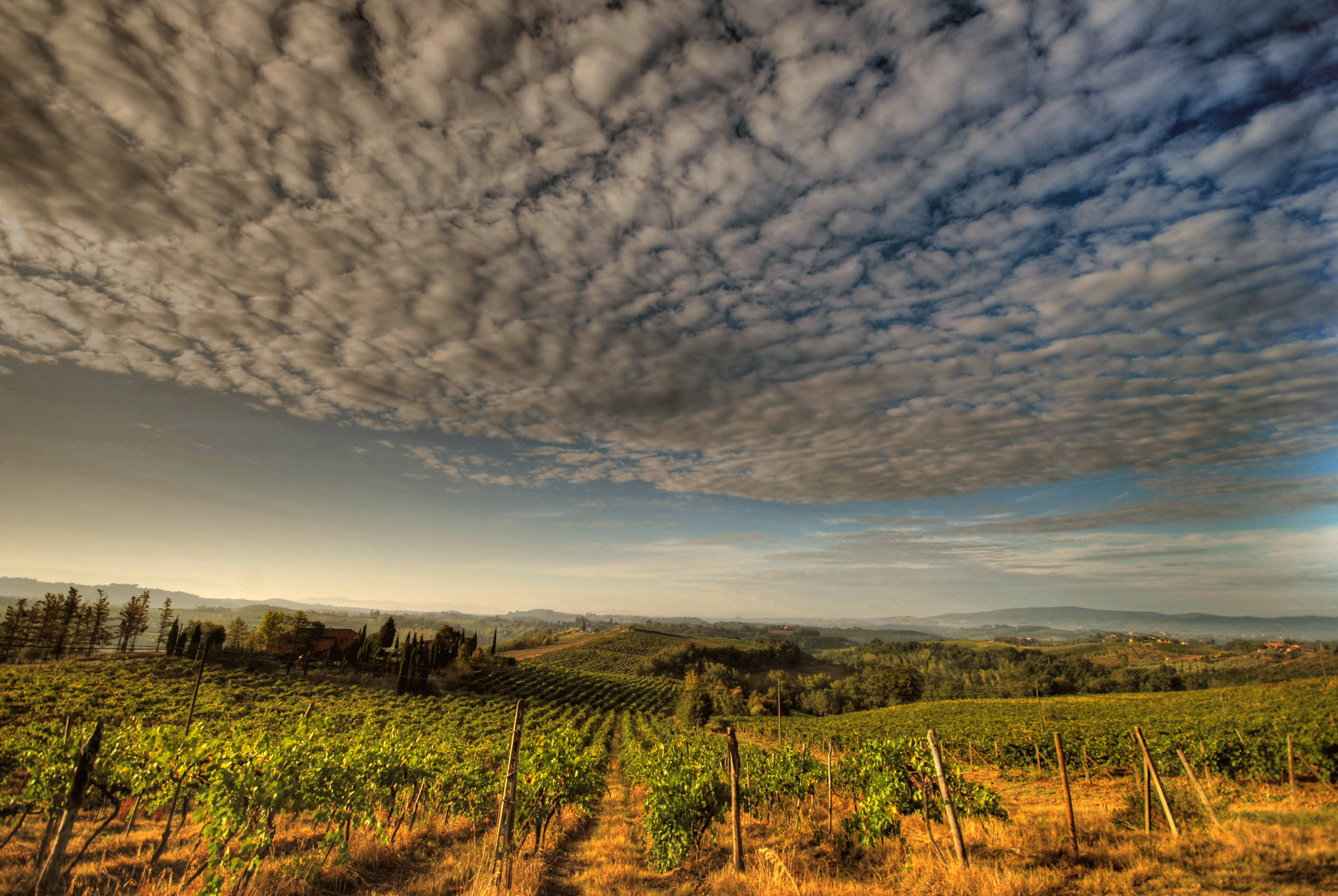
Abrusco is a minor blending grape grown in the Chianti zone (vineyard pictured) in Tuscany.

The Abrusco vine produces dark, bluish-black grape berries with a pale colored flesh. It is considered a mid-ripening variety that is usually harvested in the middle of the vintage season between the early ripening Ciliegiolo and the late ripening Sangiovese.

The grape is noted for producing wines with a deep, dark color that has often lend itself as a blending variety for other, more pale-colored varieties such as Sangiovese. As a varietal, Abrusco tends to produce well-structured wines with spicy aroma and flavor notes.

== DOC wines ==
Abrusco is a minor blending variety permitted in several Denominazione di origine controllata (DOC) and Denominazione di Origine Controllata e Garantita (DOCG) regions of Tuscany, most notably the Chianti DOCG. These include the Capalbio DOC in the hills south of the Grosseto province where along with other local red grape varieties, Abrusco is permitted to make up to 50% of the red and rosé blend along with Sangiovese (which must make up at least 50% of the wine). Here Abrusco grapes that are destined for DOC wine production must be harvested to a yield no greater 10 tonnes/hectare for the red wine and 12 tonnes/ha for the rosé. In order to attain DOC designation the finished rosé must attain a minimum alcohol level of at least 10.5% and 11% alcohol by volume for the reds.

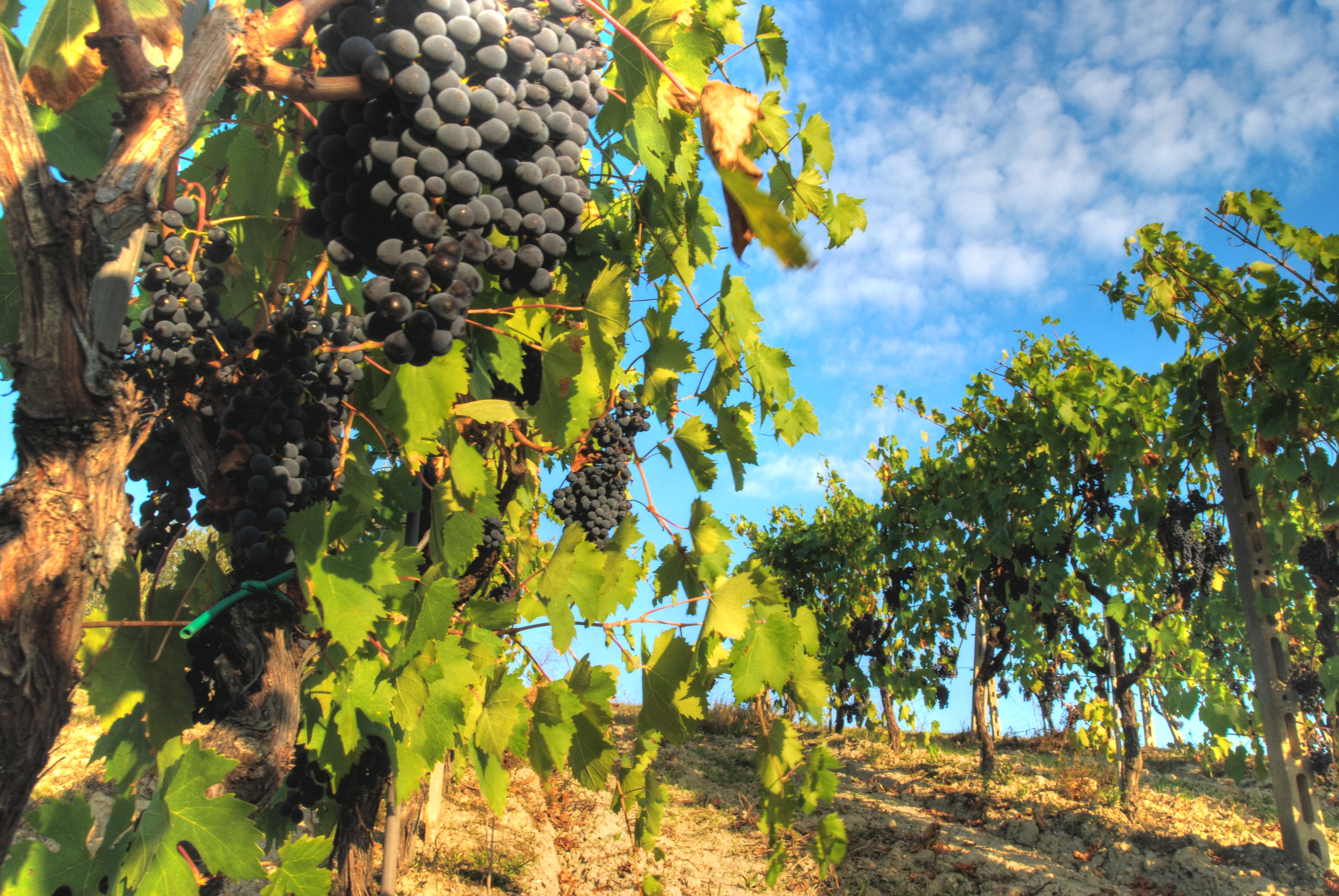
Throughout Tuscany, Abrusco is usually blended with Sangiovese (pictured) to add a deeper color to the wine.

In the Orcia DOC that lies between the Brunello di Montalcino and Vino Nobile di Montepulciano zones, Abrusco is permitted along with other local grape varieties to make up to 40% of the red wine blend along with Sangiovese (minimum 60%). Here grapes are limited to a maximum harvest yield of 10 tonnes/ha with the finished wines having a minimum alcohol level of 12%. In the Pomino DOC based around the Rufina sub-district of the Chianti zone, Abrusco is permitted along with other local red grape varieties to make up to 15% of the blend along with Sangiovese (60–75), Canaiolo, Cabernet Sauvignon, Cabernet franc (collectively 15-25%) and Merlot (10-20%). Grapes destined for DOC wine production are limited to yields of 10.5 tonnes/ha with the finished wines having at least 12% alcohol by volume. A separate Riserva bottling can be produced from this DOC from wines that have been aged for a minimum of three years with at least 18 months of that period being spent in wood and the finished wines having an alcohol level of at least 12.5%.

In the greater Chianti DOCG, Abrusco is permitted along with other local red grape varieties to make up to 10% of the blend along with Sangiovese (75-100%), Canaiolo (up to 10% on its own) and the white grapes Trebbiano and Malvasia (up to 10% collectively). Its use is far less common in the Chianti Classico DOCG (which also no longer include the white wine grapes among its permitted varieties) though it is technically still allowed. Grapes destined for Chianti DOCG production must be harvested to a yield no greater than 8 tonnes/ha with the finished wines needing to attain a minimum alcohol level of at least 12%.

== Relationship to other varieties ==
Despite the similarities in synonyms, DNA profiling has shown Abrusco to be distinct from the Tuscan wine grape Colorino and the Emilia-Romagna grape Lambrusco. Research from Dr. José Vouillamoz has also shown that Muscat Rouge de Madère, which was once thought to be a synonym of Abrusco, is actually its own variety.

== Synonyms and name origin ==
Over the years Abrusco has been known under a variety of synonyms including Abrostalo, Abrostine, Colore, Colorino, Lambrusco, Raverusto, Abrusco Nero di Toscana and Abrusio.

The name Abrusco and the synonyms Abrostine and Lambrusco are believed to derive from the same Latin phrase meaning wild vine.
