= Tuscan wine =

Notable wine region in Italy

Coordinates: 43°46′17″N 11°15′15″E

Tuscany
- Wine region
- Type: Italian wine
- Year established: 1963 (DOC), 1970 (DOCG)
- Years of wine industry: 1963–present
- Country: Italy
- Soil conditions: Clay, limestone, schist, sand, marl
- Grapes produced: 50% red varieties, 45% white varieties
- Varietals produced: Red: Sangiovese, Canaiolo, Colorino, Merlot, Cabernet Sauvignon, Cabernet Franc; White: Trebbiano, Vermentino, Malvasia, Vernaccia, Chardonnay, Viognier
- Official designations: 11 DOCGs including Brunello di Montalcino, Chianti Classico, Vino Nobile di Montepulciano; 41 DOCs including Bolgheri DOC, Carmignano DOC, Vernaccia di San Gimignano DOCG; Several IGTs including Toscana IGT

Location of Tuscany wine region in Italy

Tuscan wine is Italian wine from the Tuscany region. Located in central Italy along the Tyrrhenian coast, Tuscany is home to some of the world's most notable wine regions. Chianti, Brunello di Montalcino and Vino Nobile di Montepulciano are primarily made with Sangiovese grape whereas the Vernaccia grape is the basis of the white Vernaccia di San Gimignano. Tuscany is also known for the dessert wine Vin Santo, made from a variety of the region's grapes. Tuscany has forty-one denominazioni di origine controllata (DOC) and eleven denominazioni di origine controllata e garantita (DOCG). In the 1970s a new class of wines known in the trade as "Super Tuscans" emerged. These wines were made outside DOC/DOCG regulations but were considered of high quality and commanded high prices. Many of these wines became cult wines. In the reformation of the Italian classification system many of the original Super Tuscans now qualify as DOC or DOCG wines (such as the new Bolgheri label) but some producers still prefer the declassified rankings or to use the Indicazione Geografica Tipica (IGT) classification of Toscana. Tuscany has six sub-categories of IGT wines today.

== History ==
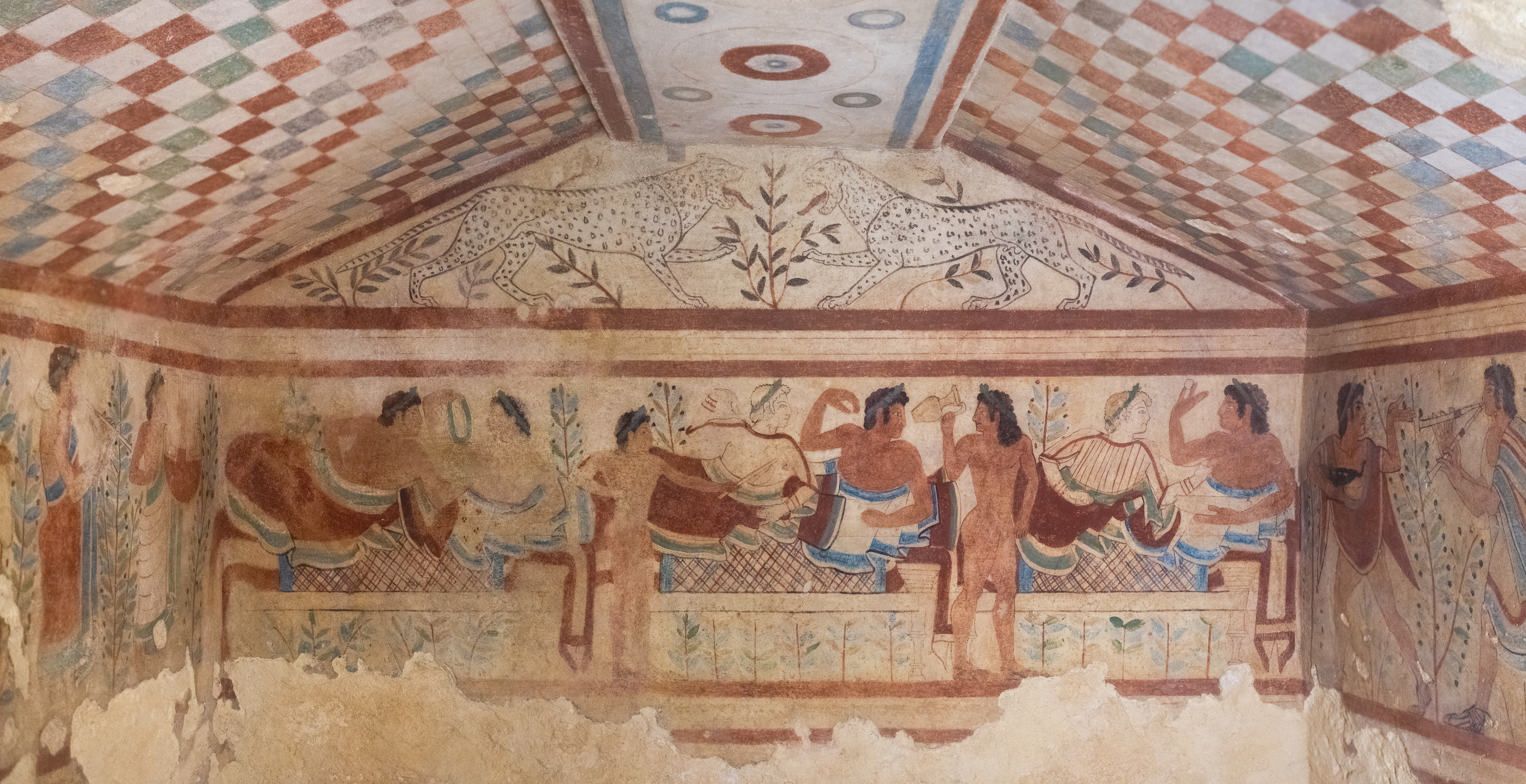
Banqueting scene in the Tomb of the Leopards

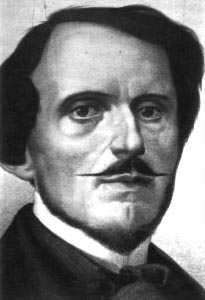
Winemaker and politician Bettino Ricasoli

The history of viticulture in Tuscany dates back to its settlements by the Etruscans in the 8th century BC. Amphora remnants originating in the region show that Tuscan wine was exported to southern Italy and Gaul as early as the 7th century BC. By the 3rd century BC, there were literary references by Greek writers about the quality of Tuscan wine. From the fall of the Roman Empire and throughout the Middle Ages, monasteries were the main purveyors of wines in the region. As the aristocratic and merchant classes emerged, they inherited the sharecropping system of agriculture known as mezzadria. This system took its name from the arrangement whereby the landowner provides the land and resources for planting in exchange for half (mezza) of the yearly crop. Many Tuscan landowners would turn their half of the grape harvest into wine that would be sold to merchants in Florence. The earliest reference of Florentine wine retailers dates to 1079 and a guild was created in 1282.

The Arte dei Vinattieri guild established strict regulations on how the Florentine wine merchants could conduct business. No wine was to be sold within 100 yards (91 m) of a church. Wine merchants were also prohibited from serving children under age 15 or to prostitutes, ruffians and thieves. In the 14th century, an average of 7.9 million US gallons (30,000 m^{3}) of wine was sold every year in Florence. The earliest references to Vino Nobile di Montepulciano wine date to the late 14th century. The first recorded mention of wine from Chianti was by the Tuscan merchant Francesco di Marco Datini, the "merchant of Prato", who described it as a light, white wine. The Vernaccia and Greco wines of San Gimignano were considered luxury items and treasured as gifts over saffron. During this period Tuscan winemakers began experimenting with new techniques and invented the process of governo which helped to stabilize the wines and ferment the sugar content sufficiently to make them dry. In 1685 the Tuscan author Francesco Redi wrote Bacco in Toscana, a 980-line poem describing the wines of Tuscany.

Following the end of the Napoleonic Wars, Tuscany returned to the rule of the Habsburgs. It was at this point that the statesman Bettino Ricasoli inherited his family ancestral estate in Broglio located in the heart of the Chianti Classico zone. Determined to improve the estate, Ricasoli traveled throughout Germany and France, studying the grape varieties and viticultural practices. He imported several of the varieties back to Tuscany and experimented with different varieties in his vineyards. However, in his experiments Ricasoli discovered that three local varieties—Sangiovese, Canaiolo and Malvasia—produced the best wine. In 1848, revolutions broke out in Italy and Ricasoli's beloved wife died, leaving him with little interest to devote to wine. In the 1850s Oidium Erysiphe necator and war devastated most of Tuscany's vineyards with many peasant farmers leaving for other parts of Italy or to emigrate to the Americas. Under the mezzadria employment arrangement, most of the wine produced by peasants was drunk by their landlords. Peasants stretched their meagre supply with water, labelling the resulting drink l'acqua pazza (lit. 'crazy water').

== Climate and geography ==
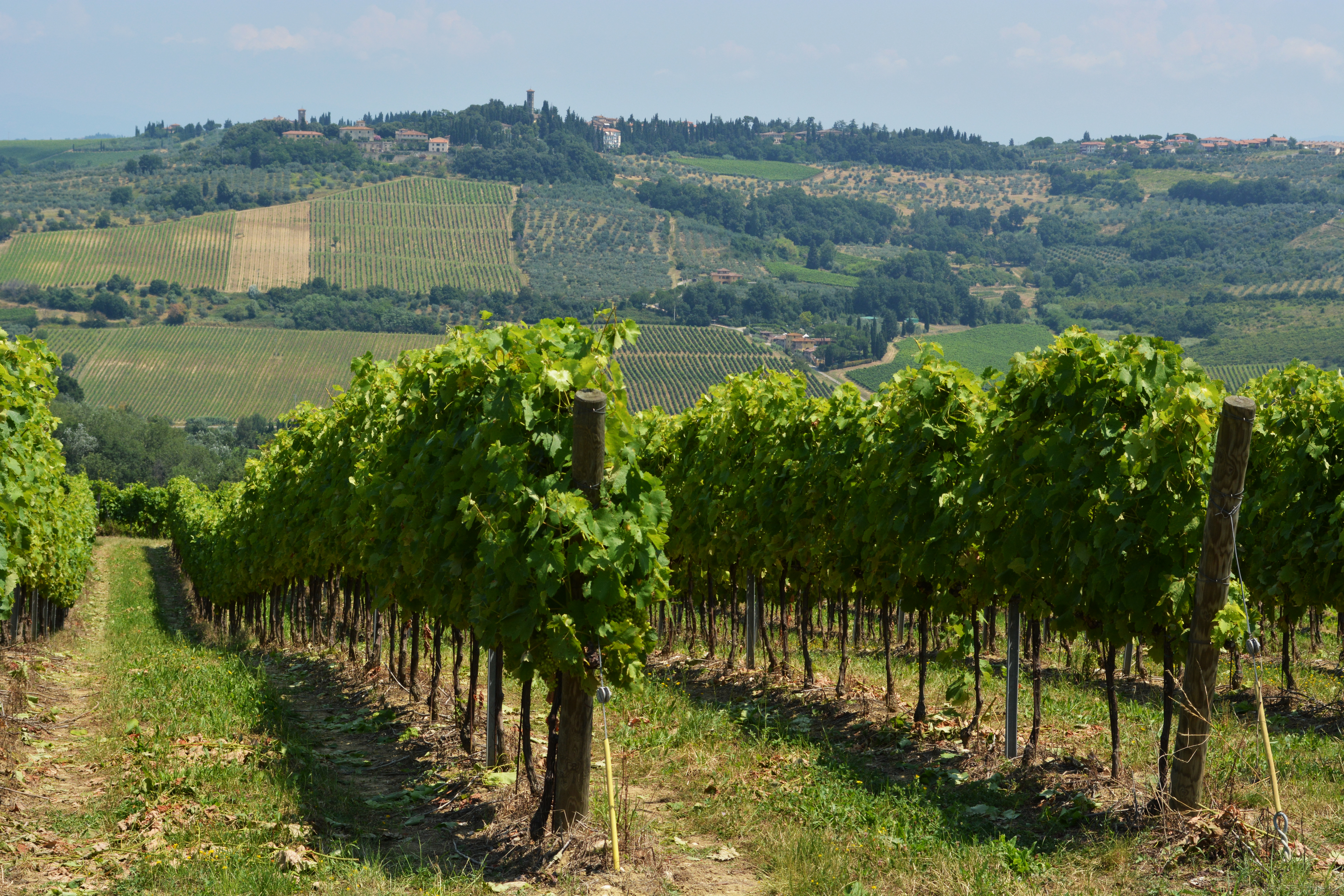
Vineyards around Siena

Tuscany (which includes seven coastal islands) is Italy's fifth largest region. It is bordered to the northwest by Liguria, the north by Emilia-Romagna, Umbria to the east and Lazio to the south. To the west is the Tyrrhenian Sea which gives the area a warm Mediterranean climate. The terrain is quite hilly (over 68% of the terrain), progressing inward to the Apennine Mountains along the border with Emilia-Romagna. The hills have a tempering effect on the summertime heat, with many vineyards planted on the higher elevations of the hillsides.

The Sangiovese grape performs better when it can receive more direct sunlight, which is a benefit of the many hillside vineyards in Tuscany. The majority of the region's vineyards are found at altitudes of 500–1,600 ft (150–490 m). The higher elevations also increase the diurnal temperature variation, helping the grapes maintain their balance of sugars and acidity as well as their aromatic qualities.

== Wines and grapes ==
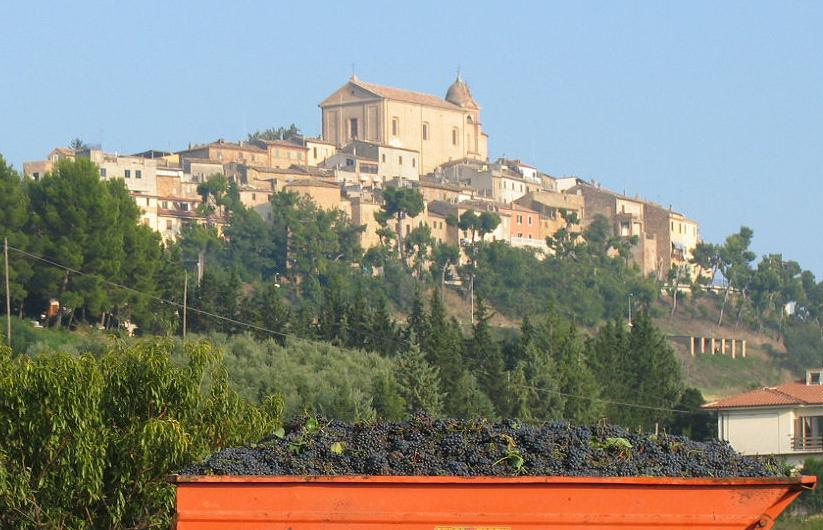
Sangiovese grapes harvested in the Montepulciano region

After Piedmont and the Veneto, Tuscany produces the third highest volume of DOC/G quality wines. Tuscany is Italy's third most planted region (behind Sicily and Apulia) but it is eighth in production volume. This is partly because the soil of Tuscany is very poor, and producers emphasize low yields and higher quality levels in their wine. More than 80% of the region's production is red wine.

The Sangiovese grape is Tuscany's most prominent grape; however, many different clonal varieties exist, as many towns have their own local version of Sangiovese. Cabernet Sauvignon has been planted in Tuscany for over 250 years, but has only recently become associated with the region due to the rise of the Super Tuscans. Other international varieties found in Tuscany include Cabernet franc, Chardonnay, Merlot, Pinot noir, Sauvignon blanc and Syrah. Of the many local red grape varieties Canaiolo, Colorino, Malvasia nera and Mammolo are the most widely planted. For Tuscan white wines, Trebbiano is the most widely planted variety followed by Malvasia, Vermentino and Vernaccia.

=== Super Tuscans ===
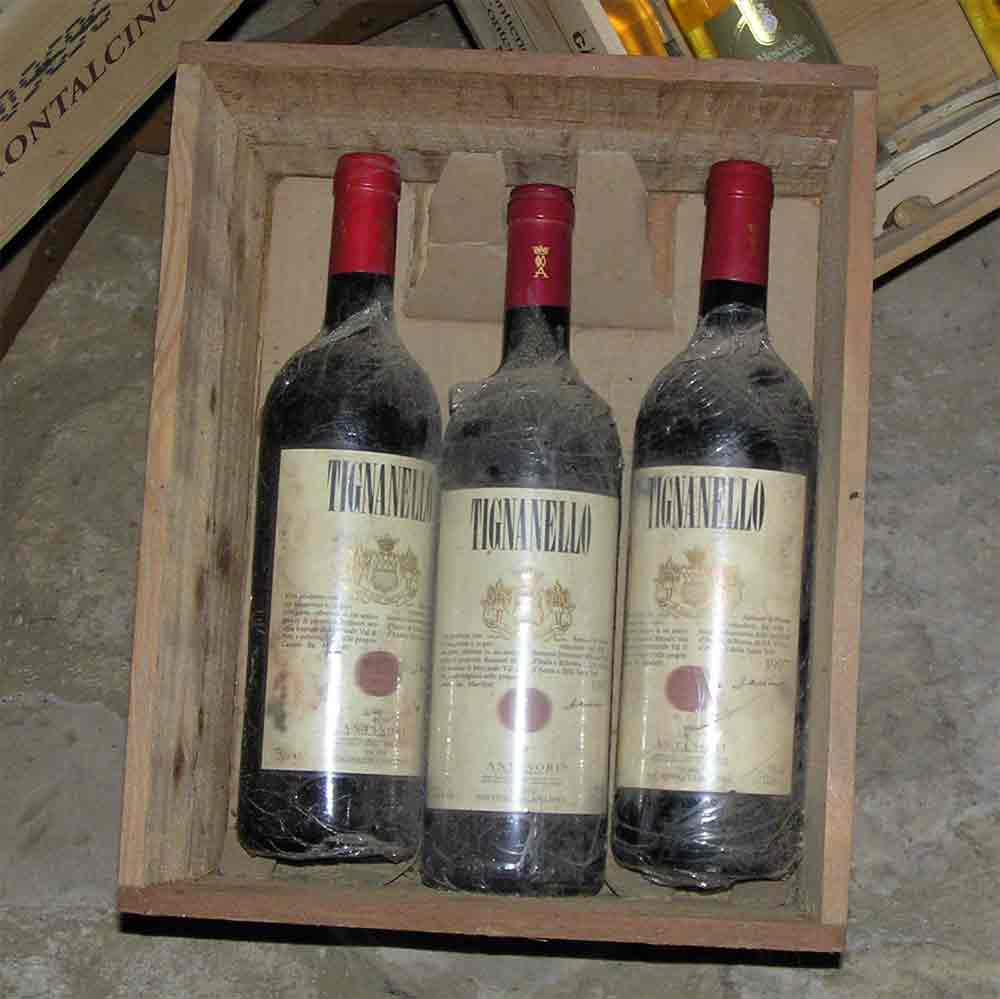
Tignanello, one of the early Super Tuscans

Super Tuscans are an unofficial category of Tuscan wines, not recognized within the Italian wine classification system. Although an extraordinary number of wines claim to be "the first Super Tuscan," most would agree that this credit belongs to Sassicaia, the brainchild of marchese Mario Incisa della Rocchetta, who planted Cabernet Sauvignon at his Tenuta San Guido estate in Bolgheri back in 1944. It was for many years the marchese's personal wine, until, starting with the 1968 vintage, it was released commercially in 1971. The growth of Super Tuscans is also rooted in the restrictive DOC practices of the Chianti zone prior to the 1990s. During this time Chianti could be composed of no more than 70% Sangiovese and had to include at least 10% of one of the local white wine grapes. Producers who deviated from these regulations could not use the Chianti name on their wine labels and would be classified as vino da tavola—Italy's lowest wine designation. By the 1970s, the consumer market for Chianti wines was suffering and the wines were widely perceived to be lacking quality. Many Tuscan wine producers thought they could produce a better quality wine if they were not hindered by the DOC regulations.

The marchese Piero Antinori was one of the first to create a "Chianti-style" wine that ignored the DOC regulations, releasing a 1971 Sangiovese–Cabernet Sauvignon blend known as Tignanello in 1978. He was inspired by Sassicaia, of which he was given the sale agency by his uncle Mario Incisa della Rocchetta. Other producers followed suit and soon the prices for these Super Tuscans were consistently beating the prices of some of most well known Chianti. Rather than rely on name recognition of the Chianti region, the Super Tuscan producers sought to create a wine brand that would be recognizable on its own merits by consumers. By the late 1980s, the trend of creating high-quality non-DOC wines had spread to other regions of Tuscany, as well as Piedmont and Veneto. Modification to the Chianti DOC regulation attempted to "correct" the issues of Super Tuscans, so that many of the original Super Tuscans would now qualify as standard DOC/G Chianti. Most producers have brought their Super Tuscans back under legal regulations, notably since the creation of the less restrictive IGT Toscana designation in 1992 and the DOC Bolgheri designation in 1994, while the pioneer Sassicaia was prized with its own exclusive Bolgheri Sassicaia DOC.

In addition to wines based on the Sangiovese grape, many well known Super Tuscans are based on a "Bordeaux-blend", meaning a combination of grapes typical for Bordeaux (especially Cabernet Sauvignon and Merlot). These grapes are not originally from the region, but imported and planted later. The climate in Tuscany has proven to be very good for these grapes.

=== Vin Santo ===
While Tuscany is not the only Italian region to make the passito dessert wine Vin Santo (meaning "holy wine"), the Tuscan versions of the wine are well regarded and sought for by wine consumers. The best-known version is from the Chianti Classico and is produced with a blend of Trebbiano and Malvasia Bianca. Red and rosé styles are also produced mostly based on the Sangiovese grape. The wines are aged in barrels for a minimum of three years, four if it is meant to be a Riserva.

== Wine regions ==
Tuscany's 41 DOC and 11 DOCG are spread out across the region's ten provinces.

=== Brunello di Montalcino ===
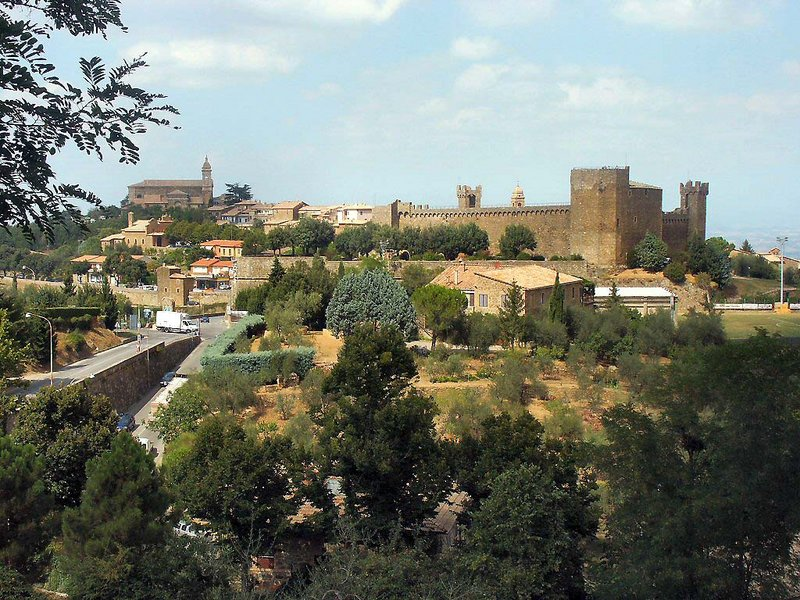
Village of Montalcino

Brunello is the name of the local Sangiovese variety that is grown around the village of Montalcino. Located south of the Chianti Classico zone, the Montalcino range is drier and warmer than Chianti. Monte Amiata shields the area from the winds coming from the southeast. Many of the area's vineyards are located on the hillsides leading up towards the mountain to elevations of around 1,640 ft (500 m) though some vineyards can be found in lower-lying areas. The wines of northern and eastern regions tend to ripen more slowly and produce more perfumed and lighter wines. The southern and western regions are warmer, and the resulting wines tend to be richer and more intense.

The Brunello variety of Sangiovese seems to flourish in this terroir, ripening easily and consistently producing wines of deep color, extract, richness with full bodies and good balance of tannins. In the mid-19th century, a local farmer named Clemente Santi is believed to have isolated the Brunello clone and planted it in this region. His grandson Ferruccio Biondi-Santi helped to popularize Brunello di Montalcino in the later half of the 19th century. In the 1980s, it was the first wine to earn the DOCG classification. Today there are about two hundred growers in the Montalcino region producing about 333,000 cases of Brunello di Montalcino a year.

Brunello di Montalcino wines are required to be aged for at least four years prior to being released, with riserva wines needing five years. Brunellos tend to be very tight and tannic in their youth, needing at least a decade or two before they start to soften with wines from excellent vintages having the potential to do well past 50 years. In 1984, the Montalcino region was granted the DOC designation Rosso di Montalcino. Often called Baby Brunellos, these wines are typically made from the same grapes, vineyards and style as the regular Brunello di Montalcino but are not aged as long. While similar to Brunellos in flavor and aromas, these wines are often lighter in body and more approachable in their youth.

=== Carmignano ===
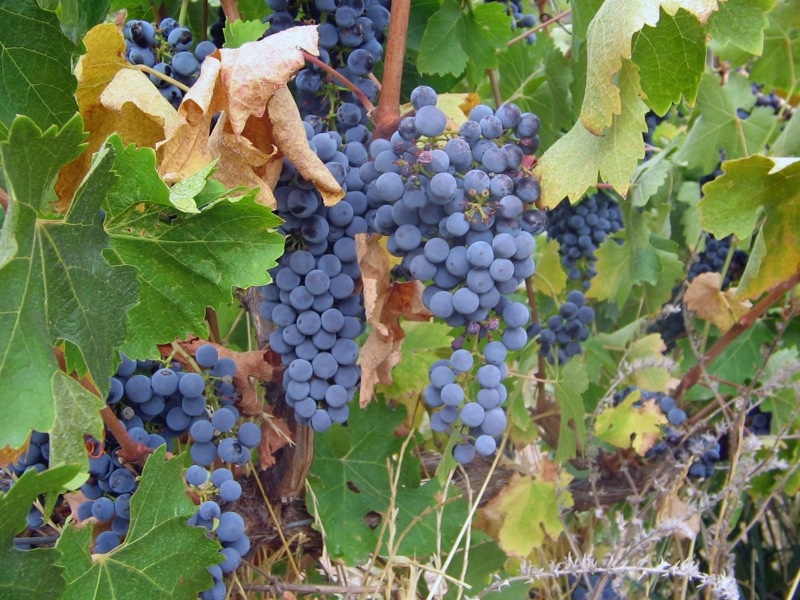
Carmignano was the first Tuscan DOCG to sanction the use of blending Cabernet Sauvignon (pictured) with Sangiovese.

The Carmignano region was one of the first Tuscan regions to be permitted to use Cabernet Sauvignon and Cabernet Franc in their DOC wines since those varieties had a long history of being grown in the region.

Noted for the quality of its wines since the Middle Ages, Carmignano was identified by Cosimo III de' Medici, Grand Duke of Tuscany as one of the superior wine producing areas of Tuscany and granted special legal protections in 1716. In the 18th century, the producers of the Carmignano region developed a tradition of blending Sangiovese with Cabernet Sauvignon, long before the practice became popularized by the "Super Tuscan" of the late 20th century. In 1975, the region was awarded denominazione di origine controllata (DOC) status and subsequently promoted to denominazione di origine controllata e garantita (DOCG) status in 1990 (retroactive to the 1988 vintage). Today Carmignano has approximately 270 acres (110 ha) planted, producing nearly 71,500 US gallons (271,000 L) of DOCG designated wine a year.

=== Chianti ===
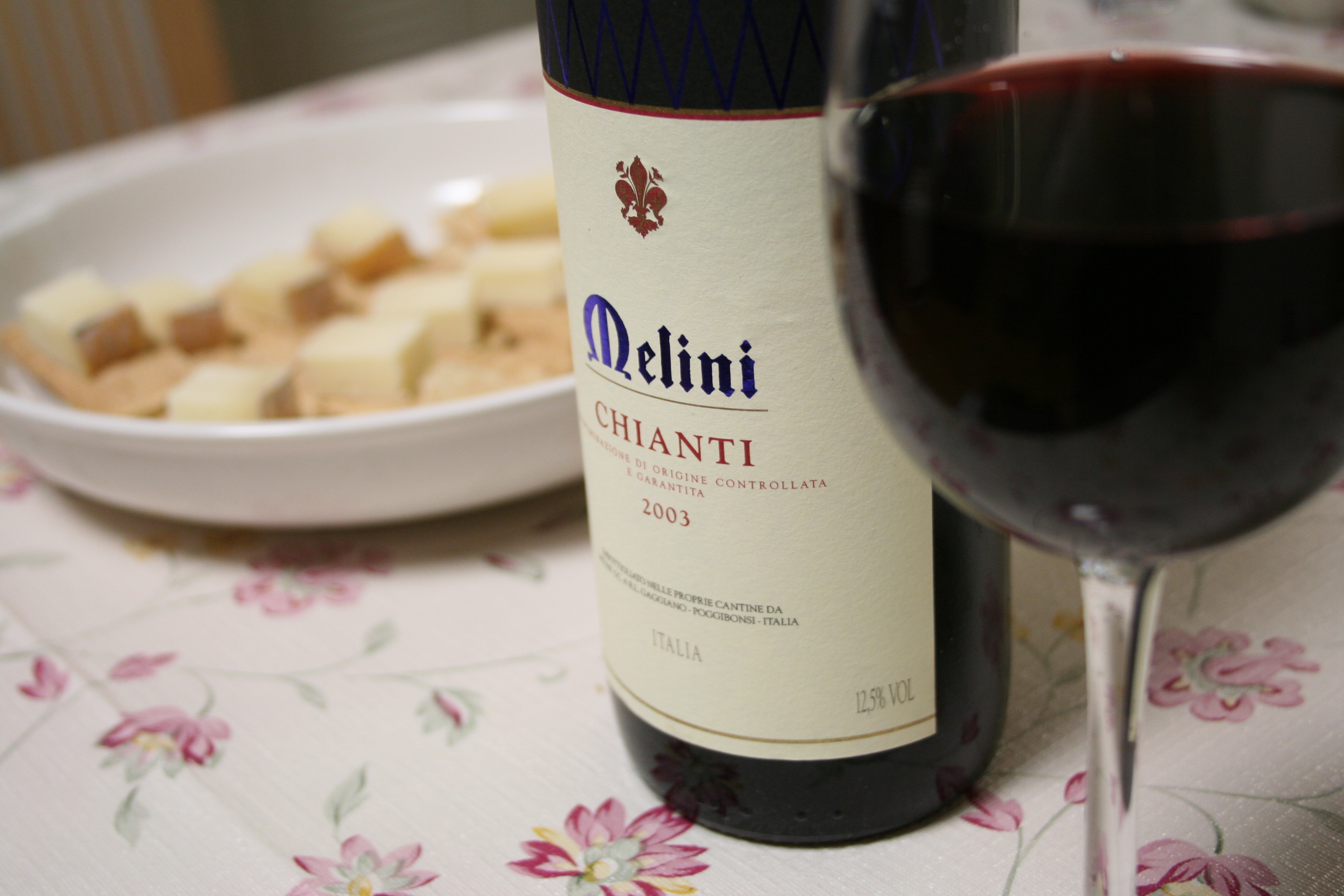
A glass of Chianti

Located in the central region of Tuscany, the Chianti zone is Tuscany's largest classified wine region and produces over eight million cases a year. In addition to producing the well known red Chianti wine, the Chianti zone also produces white, other Rosso reds and Vin Santo. The region is split into two DOCG- Chianti and Chianti Classico. The Chianti Classico zone covers the area between Florence and Siena, which is the original Chianti region, and where some of the best expressions of Chianti wine are produced. The larger Chianti DOCG zone is further divided in six DOC sub-zones and areas in the western part of the province of Pisa, the Florentine hills north of Chianti Classico in the province of Florence, the Siena hills south of the city in the province of Siena, the province of Arezzo and the area around the communes of Rufina and Pistoia.

Since 1996, Chianti is permitted to include as little as 75% Sangiovese, a maximum of 10% Canaiolo, up to 10% of the white wine grapes Malvasia and Trebbiano and up to 15% of any other red wine grape grown in the region, such as Cabernet Sauvignon. This variety of grapes and usage is one reason why Chianti can vary widely from producer to producer. The use of white grapes in the blend could alter the style of Chianti by softening the wines with a higher percentage of white grapes, typically indicating that the wine is meant to be drunk younger and not aged for long. In general, Chianti Classicos are described as medium-bodied wines with firm, dry tannins. The characteristic aroma is cherry but it can also carry nutty and floral notes as well.

In 2006, the use of white grapes Trebbiano and Malvasia was prohibited (except in Chianti Colli Senesi until the 2015 vintage). Local laws also require wines to have a minimum of 70% Sangiovese (and 80% for the more prestigious Chianti Classico DOCG). The native varieties Canaiolo and Colorino are also permitted, as are the international classics, Cabernet Sauvignon and Merlot, to a limited degree.

The Chianti Classico region covers approximately 100 mi^{2} (260 km^{2}) and includes the communes of Castellina, Gaiole, Greve and Radda and Panzano, as well as parts of four other neighboring communes. The terroir of the Classico zone varies throughout the region depending on the vineyards' altitude, soil type and distance from the Arno River. The soils of the northern communes, such as Greve, are richer in clay deposits while those in the southern communes, like Gaiole, are harder and stonier. Riserva Chianti is aged for at least 27 months, some of it in oak, and must have a minimum alcohol content of 12.5%. Wines from the Chianti DOCG can carry the name of one of the six sub-zones or just the Chianti designation. The Chianti Superiore designation refers to wines produced in the provinces of Florence and Siena but not in the Classico zone.

=== Bolgheri ===
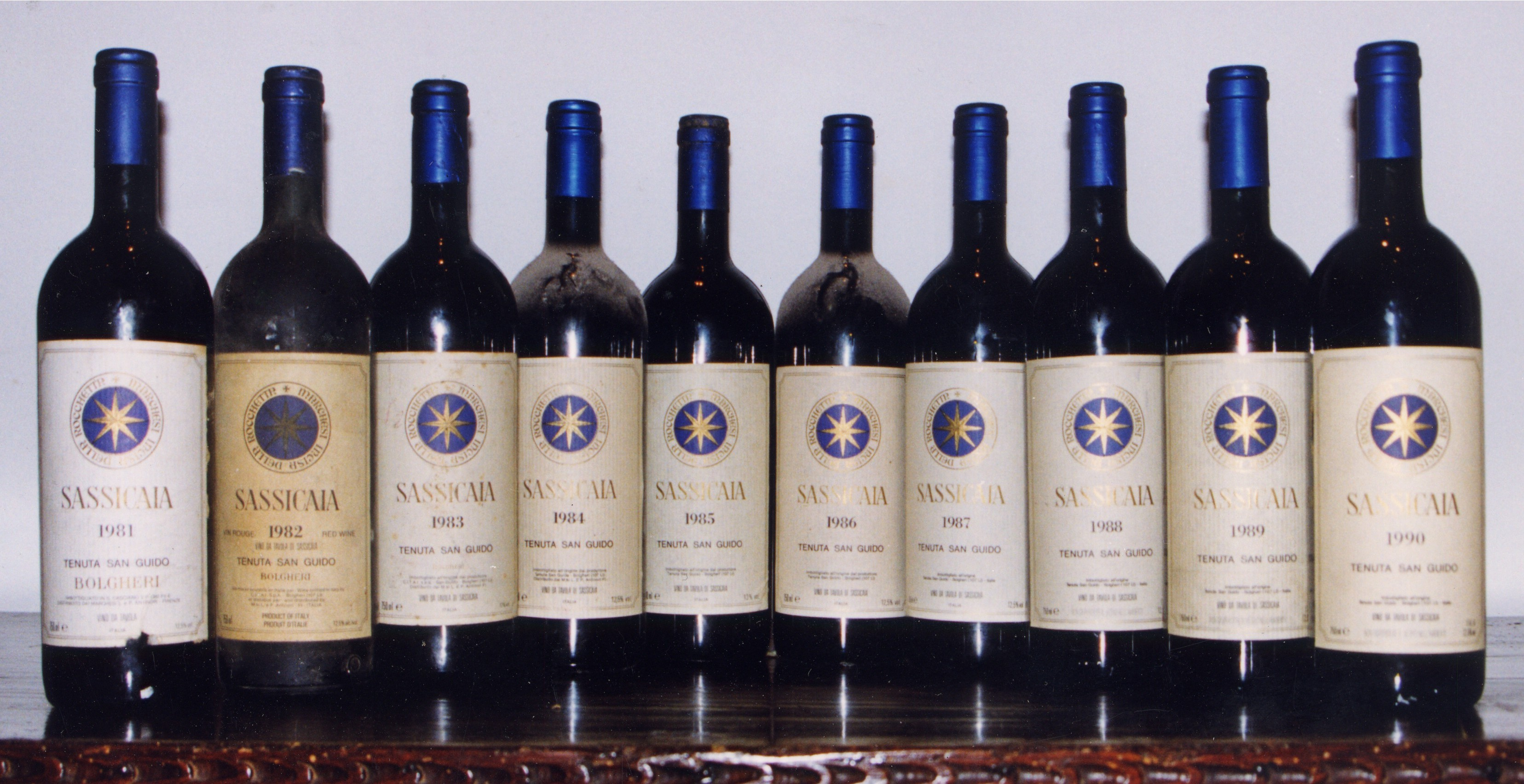
The Super Tuscan wine Sassicaia from the Bolgheri region

The DOC Bolgheri region of the Livorno province is home to one of the original Super Tuscan wines Sassicaia, first made in 1944 produced by the marchesi Incisa della Rochetta, cousin of the Antinori family. The DOC Bolgheri region is also home to the Super Tuscan wine Ornellaia which was featured in the film Mondovino as well as Tignanello from Marchesi Antinori.

=== Vernaccia di San Gimignano ===
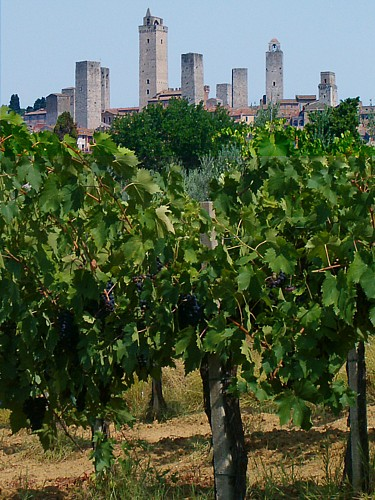
Vineyards in San Gimignano

Vernaccia di San Gimignano is a white wine made from the Vernaccia grape in the areas around San Gimignano. In 1966, it was the first wine to receive a DOC designation. This wine style has been made in the area for over seven centuries. The wine is dry and full-bodied with earthy notes of honey and minerals. In some styles it can be made to emphasize the fruit more and some producers have experimented with aging or fermenting the wine in oak barrels in order to give the wine a sense of creaminess or toastiness.

=== Vino Nobile di Montepulciano ===
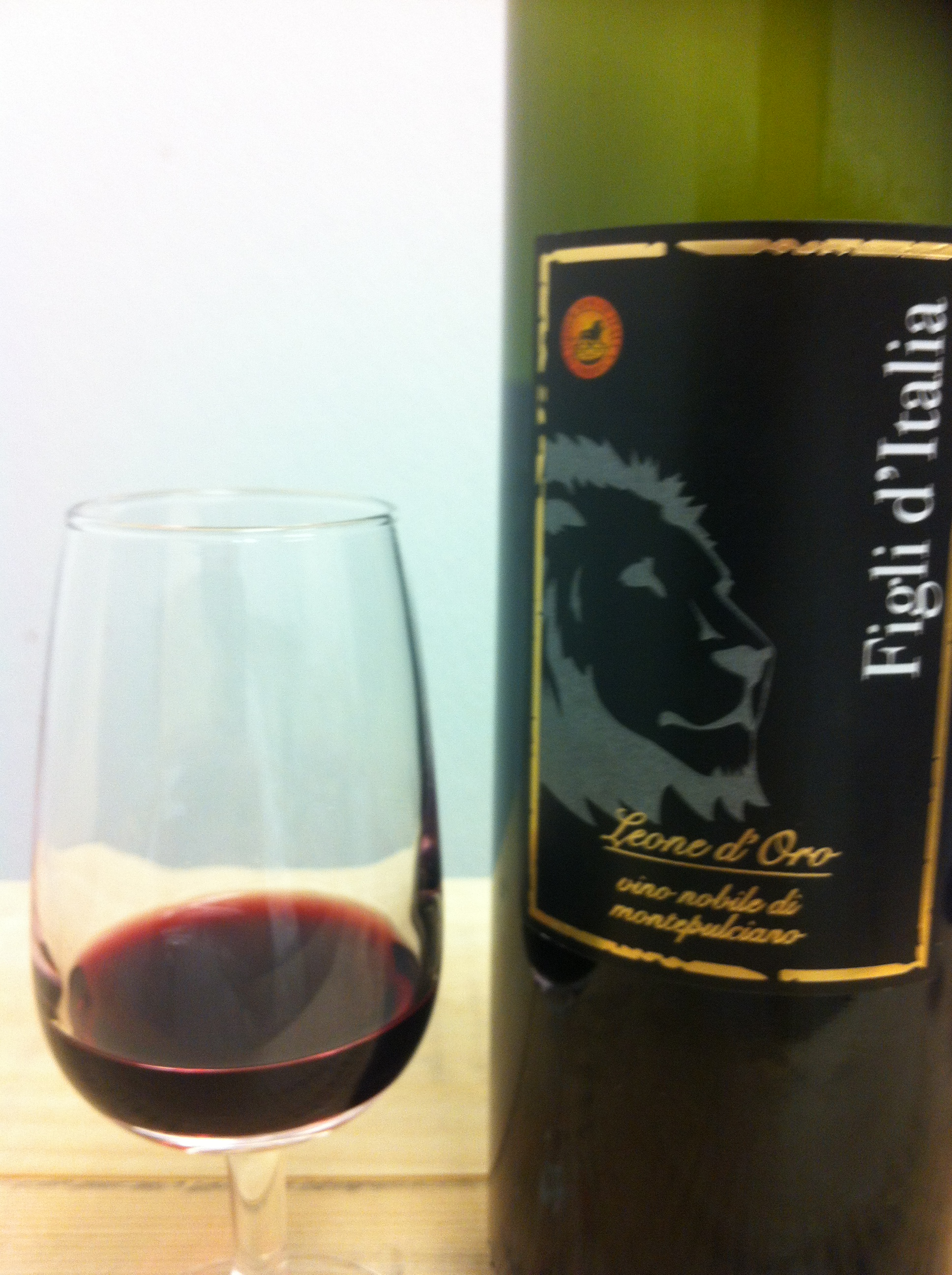
A Vino Nobile di Montepulciano

The Vino Nobile di Montepulciano received its DOCG status shortly after Brunello di Montalcino, in 1980. The DOCG covers the red wine of the Montepulciano area. The wine received its name in the 17th century, when it was the favorite wine of the Tuscan nobility. Located in the southeastern region of Tuscany, the climate of the region is strongly influenced by the sea. The variety of Sangiovese in Montepulciano is known as Prugnolo Gentile and is required to account for at least 80% of the wine. Traditionally Canaiolo and Mammolo make up the remaining part of the blend but some producers have begun to experiment with Cabernet Sauvignon and Merlot.

The wines are required to age two years prior to release, with an additional year if it is to be a riserva. The recent use of French oak barrels has increased the body and intensity of the wines which are noted for their plummy fruit, almond notes and smooth tannins.

=== The origin of Valdichiana wines ===
In Etruscan times, Valdichiana, an area which presently stretches along the Southeastern part of Tuscany up to the Florence-Rome road ramification, was called the "Breadbasket of Etruria". However, its hills were already dotted with vineyards. Later on, Plinius the Elder would describe the quality of these wines as follows: Talpone (red) and Ethesiaca (white). This was a vine growing culture spreading over the hills of the Tuscan part of Valdichiana surrounding the important commercial centres of Foiano della Chiana, Lucignano, Cortona, Montepulciano and Arezzo. The importance given to this economical activity was confirmed in the following years in successive stages in the writings of the Bishopric of Arezzo in Valdichiana Champagne. During the 1800s, the merchants of Bourgogne and Champagne decided to use the wines of Tuscan Valdichiana due to their renowned quality as a base for their champagnes after the phylloxera or vine-pest had destroyed their vineyards.

The wine making tradition was enriched and endorsed in the late 1960s and early 1970s with the DOC guarantee of origin recognition thanks to the effort of few noble families such as Della Stufa (Castello del Calcione, Lucignano) and Mancini Griffoli (Fattoria Santa Vittoria, Pozzo della Chiana).

The first policy document of 1972 only protected the denomination of the "Virgin White Valdichiana" type. Later, the policy document was modified and enriched to include the entire selection of wines produced in the Tuscan Valdichiana. In 1989, the DOC guarantee of origin was extended to the sparkling and spumante types. In 1993, output was lowered and modified. Later, in 1999, a production policy was put in action for white berry types (chardonnay and grechetto), red berry types (red, rosato, sangiovese), and Vin Santo, thus fulfilling the aspirations of the producers after more than thirty years. In 1999, the DOC guarantee of origin also varied the name "Valdichiana", and in 2011 with DM 22/11/11, the "Tuscan Valdichiana" denomination was further varied with the aim of giving the exact perception that the wine produced there comes from the part of the Valdichiana that is situated in the Tuscan region in the provinces of Arezzo and Siena. This allowed the plan of promotion to strengthen the fundamental, unique, strong, and essential bond with its territory.

== Other Tuscan wines ==
The Pomino region near Rufina has been historically known for the prevalence of the French wine grape varieties, making wines from both Cabernets as well as Chardonnay, Merlot, Pinot blanc, Pinot grigio in addition to the local Italian varieties. The Frescobaldi family is one of the area's most prominent wine producers.

In southern Tuscany, towards the region of Latium, is the area of Maremma which has its own IGT designation Maremma Toscana. Maremma is also home to Tuscany's newest DOCG, Morellino di Scansano, which makes a fragrant, dry Sangiovese based wine. The province of Grosseto is one of Tuscany's emerging wine regions with eight DOC designations, half of which were created in the late 1990s. It includes the Monteregio di Massa Marittima region which has been recently the recipient of foreign investment in the area's wine, especially by "flying winemakers". The Parrina region is known for its white wine blend of Trebbiano and Ansonica. The wine Bianco di Pitigliano is known for its eclectic mix of white wine grapes in the blend including Chardonnay, the Greco sub variety of Trebbiano, Grechetto, Malvasia, Pinot blanc, Verdello and Welschriesling. In Maremma, a hidden gem with many wineries, is Poggio Argentiera winery which makes Morellino di Scansano and other wines.

The wines of Montecarlo region include several varieties that are not commonly found in Tuscan wines including Sémillon and Roussanne. The minor Chianti grape Ciliegiolo is also popular here. The island of Elba has one of the longest winemaking histories in Tuscany and is home to its own DOC. Some of the wines produced here include a sparkling Trebbiano wine, a sweet Ansonica passito, and a semi-sweet dessert wine from Aleatico.

== List of approved quality labels for Tuscan wines ==
=== DOCG ===
- Brunello di Montalcino (Rosso as normale and Riserva), produced in the province of Siena
- Carmignano (Rosso as normale and Riserva), produced in the provinces of Firenze and Prato
- Chianti (Rosso as normale and Riserva), produced in the provinces of Arezzo, Firenze, Pisa, Pistoia, Prato and Siena; with the option to indicate one of the sub-regions:
  - Classico as normale and Riserva, produced in the provinces of Firenze and Siena (Note: Since 1996 the Classico sub-region has had a disciplinare (official document laying down the regulations for production) separate from that of the rest of the Chianti.)
  - Colli Aretini as normale and Riserva produced in the province of Arezzo
  - Colli Senesi as normale and Riserva, produced in the province of Siena
  - Colli Fiorentini as normale and Riserva, produced in the province of Firenze
  - Colline Pisane as normale and Riserva, produced in the province of Pisa
  - Montalbano as normale and Riserva, produced in the provinces of Firenze, Pistoia and Prato
  - Montespertoli as normale and Riserva, produced in the province of Pisa
  - Rufina as normale and Riserva, produced in the province of Firenze
  - Chianti Superiore, produced throughout the Chianti region with the exception of the classico sub-region.
- Elba Aleatico passito produced on the island of Elba in the province of Livorno
- Montecucco Sangiovese produced in the province of Grosseto
- Morellino di Scansano (Rosso as normale and Riserva), produced in the province of Grosseto
- Suvereto produced in the province of Livorno
- Val di Cornia Rosso produced in the province of Livorno and Pisa
- Vernaccia di San Gimignano (Bianco as normale and Riserva), produced in the province of Siena
- Vino Nobile di Montepulciano (Rosso as normal and Riserva), produced in the province of Siena

=== DOC ===
- Ansonica Costa dell'Argentario produced in the province of Grosseto
- Barco Reale di Carmignano produced in the provinces of Firenze and Prato
- Bianco della Valdinievole produced in the province of Pistoia
- Bianco dell'Empolese produced in the provinces of Firenze and Pistoia
- Bianco di Pitigliano produced in the province of Grosseto
- Bianco Pisano di San Torpè produced in the province of Pisa
- Bianco Vergine della Valdichiana produced in the provinces of Arezzo and Siena
- Bolgheri produced in the province of Livorno
- Bolgheri Sassicaia produced in the province of Livorno
- Candia dei Colli Apuani produced in the province of Massa-Carrara
- Capalbio produced in the province of Grosseto
- Colli dell'Etruria Centrale produced in the provinces of Arezzo, Firenze, Pisa, Pistoia, Prato and Siena
- Colli di Luni an inter-regional DOC produced in the provinces of Massa-Carrara (Toscana) and of La Spezia (Liguria)
- Colline Lucchesi produced in the province of Lucca
- Cortona produced in the province of Arezzo
- Elba produced in the province of Livorno
- Grance Senesi produced in the province of Siena
- Grechetto Valdichiana Toscana Doc produced in the provinces of Arezzo
- Maremma Toscana produced in the province of Grosseto
- Montecarlo produced in the province of Lucca
- Montecucco produced in the province of Grosseto
- Monteregio di Massa Marittima produced in the province of Grosseto
- Montescudaio produced in the province of Pisa
- Moscadello di Montalcino produced in the province of Siena
- Orcia produced in the province of Siena
- Parrina produced in the province of Grosseto
- Pomino produced in the province of Firenze
- Rosso di Montalcino produced in the province of Siena
- Rosso di Montepulciano produced in the province of Siena
- San Gimignano produced in the province of Siena
- San Torpè produced in the province of Pisa
- Sant'Antimo produced in the province of Siena
- Sovana produced in the province of Grosseto
- Terratico di Bibbona
- Terre di Casole
- Terre di Pisa in the province of Pisa
- Val d'Arbia produced in the province of Siena
- Val d'Arno di Sopra
- Val di Cornia
- Valdichiana Toscana
- Valdinievole produced in the Province of Pistoia
- Vinsanto Valdichiana Toscana Doc produced in the provinces of Arezzo
- Vin Santo del Chianti produced in the provinces of Arezzo, Firenze, Pisa, Pistoia, Prato and Siena
- Vin Santo del Chianti Classico produced in the provinces of Firenze and Siena
- Vin Santo del Carmignano
- Vin Santo di Montepulciano produced in the province of Siena

=== IGT ===
- Alta Valle della Greve (Bianco; Rosato; Rosso in the styles normale and Novello) produced in the province of Firenze.
- Colli della Toscana Centrale (Bianco in the styles normale and Frizzante; Rosato; Rosso in the styles normale and Novello) produced in the provinces of Arezzo, Firenze, Pistoia, Prato and Siena.
- Costa Toscana (Bianco in the styles normale and Frizzante; Rosato; Rosso in the styles normale and Novello) produced in the province of Grosseto.
- Toscano or Toscana (Bianco in the styles normale, Frizzante and Abboccato; Rosato in the styles normale and Abboccato; Rosso in the styles normale, Abboccato and Novello) produced throughout the region of Toscana.
- Val di Magra (Bianco; Rosato; Rosso in the styles normale and Novello) produced in the province of Massa Carrara.
- Montecastelli (Bianco; Rosso in the styles normale and Novello) produced in the communes of Castelnuovo Val di Cecina, Volterra, and Pomarance in the province of Pisa.

== See also ==
- List of Italian DOCG wines
- List of Italian DOC wines
- List of Italian IGT wines
- History of Chianti
