= Ricciarelli =

Italian almond biscuits

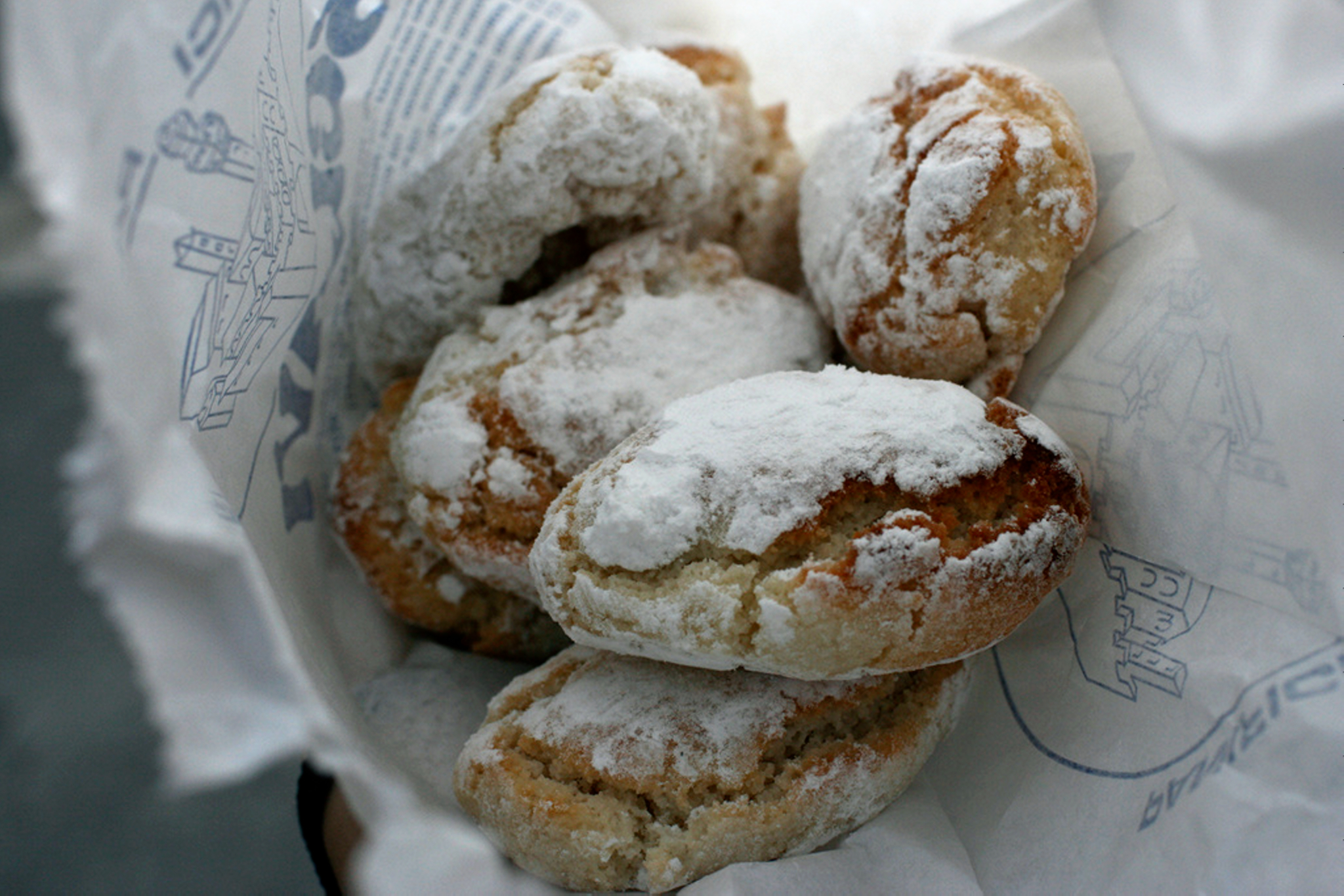
- Ricciarelli from Siena
- Type: Macaroon
- Place of origin: Italy
- Region or state: Siena, Tuscany
- Main ingredients: Almonds, sugar, honey, egg whites

Ricciarelli are a type of biscuit originating in 14th-century Siena, Italy. It is considered one of the signature sweets of Siena, in addition to panforte, cenci, and cavallucci.

== Background ==
Legend holds that they were introduced by Ricciardetto della Gherardesca in his castle near Volterra upon his return from the Crusades. He purportedly said that the "foreign biscuits curled like the Sultan's slippers". The modern biscuit does not exhibit curling. In medieval times, they were known as marzapanetti alla senese or morzelletti. They acquired the name ricciarelli in the 1800s.

An alternative etymology, from the Treccani Italian encyclopaedia, indicates that the word ricciarèlli derives from rìccio, meaning 'hedgehog', perhaps for the original form. Particularly when coated with sliced almonds, the biscuit looks like a hedgehog.

== Preparation ==
Today, the biscuits are made using an almond base with sugar, honey, and egg white. When prepared in the traditional method, the almonds are ground with a milling machine, and the finished mix is formed into numerous oval- or lozenge-shaped biscuits of about 20 grams (0.71 oz) each that are set aside for two days before baking. After baking, they are removed from the oven and allowed to cool for 15 minutes, to prevent the biscuits from breaking, before transferring them to wire racks. They may be baked with wafer paper, which is trimmed to the shape of the biscuit after they have cooled. The rough and crackled surface is usually lightly sprinkled with confectioners' sugar, and may also be covered in dark chocolate.

Ricciarelli are typically consumed at Christmas, served with a dessert wine such as Vin Santo or Moscadello di Montalcino.

Packaged biscuits sold at retail are traditionally enveloped in a blue paper tissue depicting two winged horses from the Etruscan Archeological Museum in Volterra.

== See also ==
- List of Italian desserts and pastries
- List of almond dishes
