= History of Chianti =

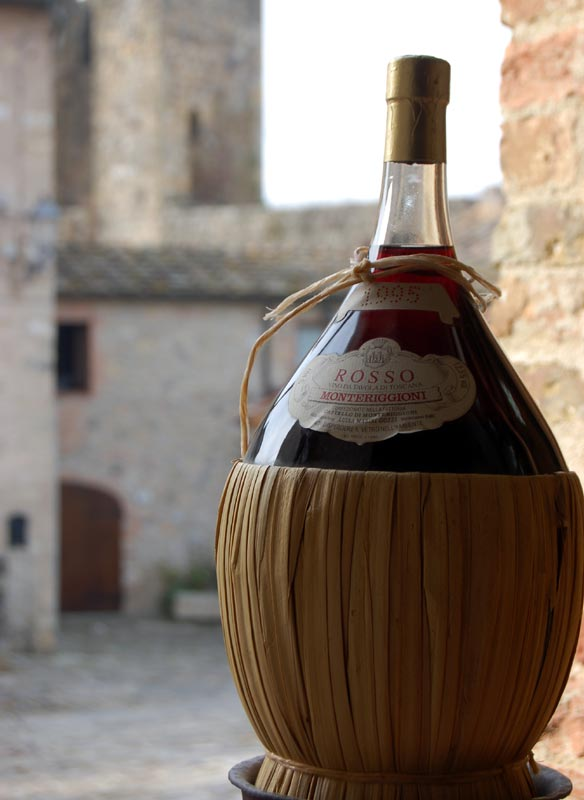
Chianti was commonly associated with the straw basket enclosed bottle known as a fiasco in the late 20th century.

The history of Chianti dates back to at least the 13th century with the earliest incarnations of Chianti as a white wine. Today this Tuscan wine is one of Italy's most well known and recognizable wines. In the Middle Ages, the villages of Gaiole, Castellina and Radda located near Florence formed as a Lega del Chianti (League of Chianti) creating an area that would become the spiritual and historical "heart" of the Chianti region and today is located within the Chianti Classico Denominazione di Origine Controllata e Garantita (DOCG). As the wines of Chianti grew in popularity other villages in Tuscany wanted their lands to be called Chianti. The boundaries of the region have seen many expansions and sub-divisions over the centuries. The variable terroir of these different macroclimates contributed to diverging range of quality on the market and by the late 20th century consumer perception of Chianti was often associated with basic mass-market Chianti sold in a squat bottle enclosed in a straw basket, called fiasco.

In addition to changing boundaries, the grape composition for Chianti has changed dramatically over the years. The earliest examples of Chianti were a white wine but gradually evolved into a red. Baron Bettino Ricasoli, the future prime minister in the Kingdom of Italy created the first known "Chianti recipe" in 1872, recommending 70% Sangiovese, 15% Canaiolo and 15% Malvasia bianca. In 1967, the Denominazione di origine controllata (DOC) regulation set by the Italian government firmly established the "Ricasoli formula" of a Sangiovese-based blend with 10-30% Malvasia and Trebbiano. However some producers desired to make Chianti that did not conform to these standards-such as a 100% variety Sangiovese wine, or all red wine grape varieties and perhaps with allowance for French grape varieties such as Cabernet Sauvignon or Merlot to be used. A few producers went ahead and made their "chianti" as they desired but, prohibited from labeling, sold them as simple vino da tavola. Despite their low level classifications, these "super Chiantis" became internationally recognized by critics and consumers and were coined as Super Tuscans. The success of these wines encouraged government officials to reconsider the DOCG regulations with many changes made to allow some of these vino da tavola to be labeled as Chiantis.

== Boundaries of the Classico region ==
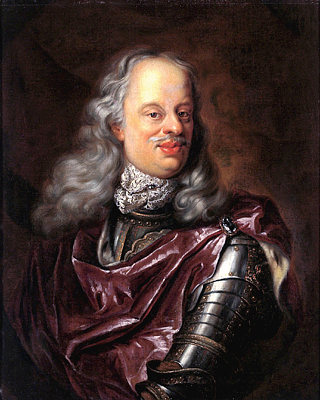
In 1716 Cosimo III de' Medici, the Grand Duke of Tuscany, legislated the first official boundaries of the Chianti region in what is today part of the Chianti Classico DOCG.

In the early Middle Ages, the area between Baliaccia and Monte Luco in the hills between the cities of Florence and Siena was known as the Chianti Mountain. This area was noted for its winemaking with the villages of Castellina, Gaiole and Radda gaining particular renown. These three villages formed a Lega del Chianti (League of Chianti) that the Florentine merchants would market as wines of distinction. In 1716 Cosimo III de' Medici, Grand Duke of Tuscany issued an edict legislating that the three villages of the Lega del Chianti as well as the village of Greve and a 2-mile (3 km) hillside north of Greve near Spedaluzza as the only officially recognized producers of Chianti. This delineation existed until July 1932, when the Italian government expanded the Chianti zone to include the outlying areas of Barberino Val d'Elsa, Chiocchio, Robbiano, San Casciano in Val di Pesa and Strada. Some of these areas, such as Robbiano, included large swaths of hillside near Florence (in what is now the Chianti DOCG sub-zone the Colli Fiorentini) that produced lighter bodied wines that were not suitable for aging or improving in quality. The 1932 expansion was canonized into DOC regulations in 1966.

In 1984 the Chianti Classico and the greater Chianti region were separated and each given their own DOCG ranking. The boundaries were to cover an area of approximate 100 square miles (259 square kilometers) between Florence to the north and Siena to the south. The four communes of Castellina, Gaiole, Greve and Radda were included along with parts of Barberino Val d'Elsa, San Casciano in Val di Pesa and Tavarnelle Val di Pesa in the province of Florence as well as Castelnuovo Berardenga and Poggibonsi in the province of Siena.

== Early history to the Renaissance ==
The early history of Chianti is very much intertwined with the history of the entire Tuscany region. The history of viticulture in the area dates back to its settlements by the Etruscans in the eighth century BC. Amphora remnants originating from the region show that Tuscan wine was exported to southern Italy and Gaul as early as the seventh century BC before both areas begun to actively cultivate grape vines themselves. From the fall of the Roman Empire and throughout the Middle Ages, monasteries were the main purveyors of wines in the region. As the aristocratic and merchant classes emerged, they inherited the sharecropping system of agriculture known as mezzadria. This system took its name from the arrangement whereby the landowner provides the land and resources for planting in exchange for half ("mezza") of the yearly crop. Many landowners in the Chianti region would turn their half of the grape harvest into wine that would be sold to merchants in Florence. The earliest reference of Florentine wine retailers dates to 1079 with a guild for wine merchants being created in 1282.

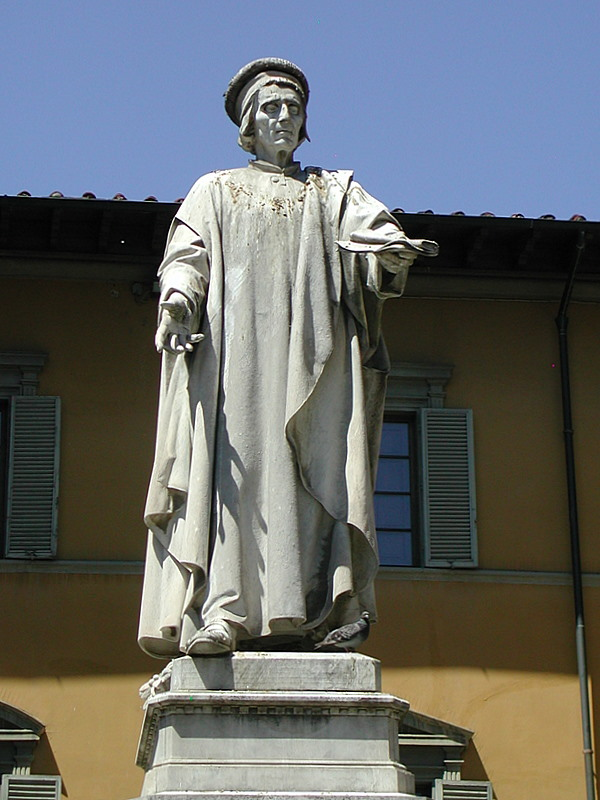
The Florentine merchant Francesco di Marco Datini sold one of the earliest examples of Chianti wines and it was white, not red.

Unlike France or Spain, Italy did not have a robust export market for its wines during the Middle Ages. Its closest trading partners, France and Austria, were separated from Italy by the massive Alps Mountains and also had ample supply of their own local wines. The English had little interest in Italian wines at this point, finding plenty of sources in France, Spain and later Portugal to quench their thirst. While the sweet Lacryma Christi from Campania had some presence on the international market, most Italian wines had to compete for taste of the local market. Even then this market was mostly limited to the aristocracy (who seemed to preferred strong wines made from Vernaccia or sweet Aleatico and Vin Santos) since outside of the major cities of Rome and Naples, there was not yet a strong middle class. During the Renaissance, the city of Florence experienced a period of growth that brought with it an emerging middle class of guilded craftsman and merchants. Some of these Florentine wine merchants, such as the Antinoris and Frescobaldis, would becoming powerful and influential figures in not only the history of Chianti but also of Italian wine.

The earliest example of Chianti was as a pale, light white wine being sold by the merchant Francesco di Marco Datini in 1398. It eventually evolved into a coarse, deep color red wine that Sir Edward Barry described as having "disagreeable roughness and other qualities, seldom drunk." Some of these "other qualities" may have been a slight fizziness that was a by product of wine making techniques that emerged during the late Middle Ages. At the time various wine faults would plague unstable Chiantis because they were not able to fully complete fermentation and yeast cells would remain active in the wine. The lack of full fermentation was partly due to cooler temperatures following harvest that stuns the yeast and prohibits activity but could have also been caused by unsanitary fermentation vessels. In the 14th century, Chianti winemakers developed a technique known as governo where half-dried grapes are added to the must to stimulate the yeast with a fresh source of sugar that may keep the yeast active all the through the fermentation process. While this technique did improve the probability of a fully fermenting wine, the second fermentation caused by the addition of the new sugars also left some carbon dioxide caused the wines to have a slightly sparkling or "fizzy" character.

Early attempts to regulate Chianti wine include 1427, when Florence developed a tariff system for the wines of the surrounding countryside, including an area referenced as "Chianti and its entire province," and 1444, when a provision was added to the Lega del Chianti bylaws that prevented grapes from being legally harvested before September 29.

== The 18th century to the Risorgimento ==
The 18th century saw the seeds of the modern Chianti industry being planted. In 1716 Cosimo III de' Medici, Grand Duke of Tuscany issued an edict delineating the boundaries that would eventually become the heart of the Chianti Classico region. Prior to becoming Holy Roman Emperor, the policies Peter Leopold as Grand Duke of Tuscany encouraged many landowning families to invest in improving and expanding their vineyards. The Georgofili Academy was funded to teach noble families modern viticultural techniques from places such as France and Germany. Families that are still making Chianti today, such as the Capponis, Firidolfis, Ricasolis and Ridolfis. The exact composition and grape varieties used to make Chianti at this point is unknown. Ampelographers find clues about which grape varieties were popular at the time in the writings of Italian writer Cosimo Villifranchi who noted that Canaiolo was widely planted variety in the area along with Sangiovese, Mammolo and Marzemino. It wasn't till the work of the Italian statesman Bettino Ricasoli that the modern "Chianti recipe" would take shape.

=== Bettino Ricasoli ===
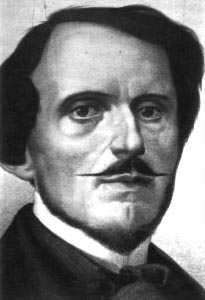
Prior to becoming Prime Minister of Italy, Bettino Ricasoli developed the first known recipe of the modern Sangiovese-based Chianti.

One of the most influential figures in the history of Chianti is the Italian statesman Bettino Ricasoli, who created the Chianti recipe that would later be canonized in DOC regulations. The Ricasoli family traces their lineage in the Chianti region to Lombard barons who ruled during the 11th century. The family estate in Brolio is located in what is now known as the heart of the Chianti Classico region in the province of Siena. Orphaned at a young age, his family estate was crippled with debt and in disarray shortly after Ricasoli got married. Restoring the estate and its vineyard became his primary focus. Ricasoli traveled throughout France and Germany, studying the latest winemaking methods and brought back with him vine cuttings of new grape varieties. He began to experiment in his vineyard and cellar on which grapes produced the best wines at his estate. His work eventually settled on a blend of three Tuscan grapes-Sangiovese, Canaiolo and Malvasia.

Ricasoli choose Sangiovese to be the base of Chianti because it provided the most aromatics. Canaiolo brought fruitiness to the wine that soften the tannins of Sangiovese without lessening the aromatics. The addition of the white wine grape Malvasia was to provide further softening. Wine expert Hugh Johnson noted that the relationship that Ricasoli describes between Sangiovese and Canaiolo has some parallels to how Cabernet Sauvignon is softened by the fruit of Merlot in the traditional Bordeaux style blend. Ricasoli continued with his winemaking endeavors until 1848 when his wife died. Stricken by grief, he had little desire for his vineyards or his wine. During this time the tides of the Risorgimento were growing stronger and Ricasoli found himself in the political arena which would eventually lead to him becoming the Prime Minister of Italy.

== 20th century to modern day ==
The 20th century saw peaks and valleys in the popularity of Chianti and eventually led to a radical evolution in the wine's style due to the influence of the "Super Tuscans". The late 19th century saw oidium and the phylloxera epidemic take its toll on the vineyards of Chianti just as they had ravaged vineyards across Europe. The chaos and poverty following the Risorgimento heralded the beginning of the Italian diaspora that would take Italian vineyard workers and winemakers abroad as immigrants to new lands. Those that stayed behind and replanted, chose high yielding varieties like Trebbiano and Sangiovese clones such as the Sangiovese di Romagna from the nearby Romagna region. Following World War II, the general trend in the world wine market was for cheap, easy-drinking wine, which saw a brief boom for the region. With over-cropping and an emphasis on quantity over quality, the reputation of Chianti among consumers eventually plummeted. By the 1950s, Trebbiano (which is known for its neutral flavors) made up to 30% of many mass-market Chiantis. By the late 20th century, Chianti was often associated with basic mass-market Chianti sold in a squat bottle enclosed in a straw basket, called fiasco. However, during this same time a group of ambitious producers began working outside the boundaries of DOC regulations to make what they believed would be a higher quality style of Chianti. These wines eventually became known as the "Super Tuscans'.

=== Rise of the Super Tuscans ===
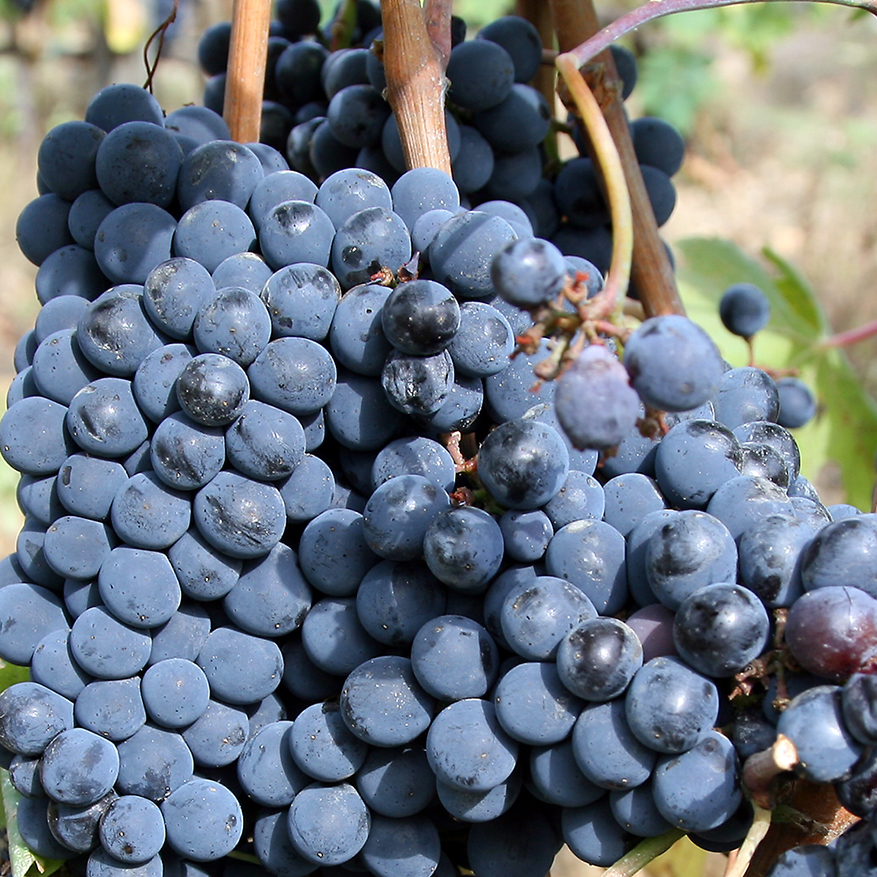
Following the success of the Super Tuscans, DOC regulations were changed to allow Chianti to be 100% variety Sangiovese if a producers so chooses.

The origin of Super Tuscans is rooted in the restrictive DOC practices of the Chianti zone prior to the 1990s. During this time Chianti could be composed of no more than 70% Sangiovese and had to include at least 10% of one of the local white grape varieties. Producers who deviated from these regulations could not use the Chianti name on their wine labels and would be classified as vino da tavola- Italy's lowest wine designation. The marchese Piero Antinori was one of the first to create a "Chianti-style" wine that ignored the DOC regulations, releasing a 1971 Sangiovese-Cabernet Sauvignon blend known as Tignanello in 1978. Other producers followed suit and soon the prices for these Super Tuscans were consistently beating the prices of some of most well-known Chiantis.

In response the international acclaim and high prices of these Super Tuscans, Italians authorities re-evaluated the DOC regulations for the Chianti region in attempt to bring some of these Super Tuscans back into the fold. They changed the grape blend composition of Chianti (not Classico or Riserva) to require a minimum of 75-90% Sangiovese, 5-10% Canaiolo nero, 5-10% Trebbiano Toscano, Malvasia bianca Lunga, and up to 10% other varietys. With respect to Chianti Classico, a minimum of 80% Sangiovese is required, and up to 20% other varieties allowed. Beginning with the 2006 vintage, no white grapes are allowed in the composition of Chianti Classico. Chianti Classico Riserva is required to have a minimum of 24 months oak aging plus an additional 3 months of bottle aging. But beyond just grape composition, the new wave of winemaking during the era of the Super Tuscan also reinvigorated the Chianti's region with modern viticultural vine training and canopy management techniques and winemaking tools such as the use of new oak barrels. This new area of innovation led to a sharp increase in the price of Chiantis to where the bottlings from many of the top houses now match the prices of the premium Super Tuscans.

Today, Super Tuscans are entitled to the DOC Bolgheri or the generic IGT label.
