= San Regolo =

- Frazione
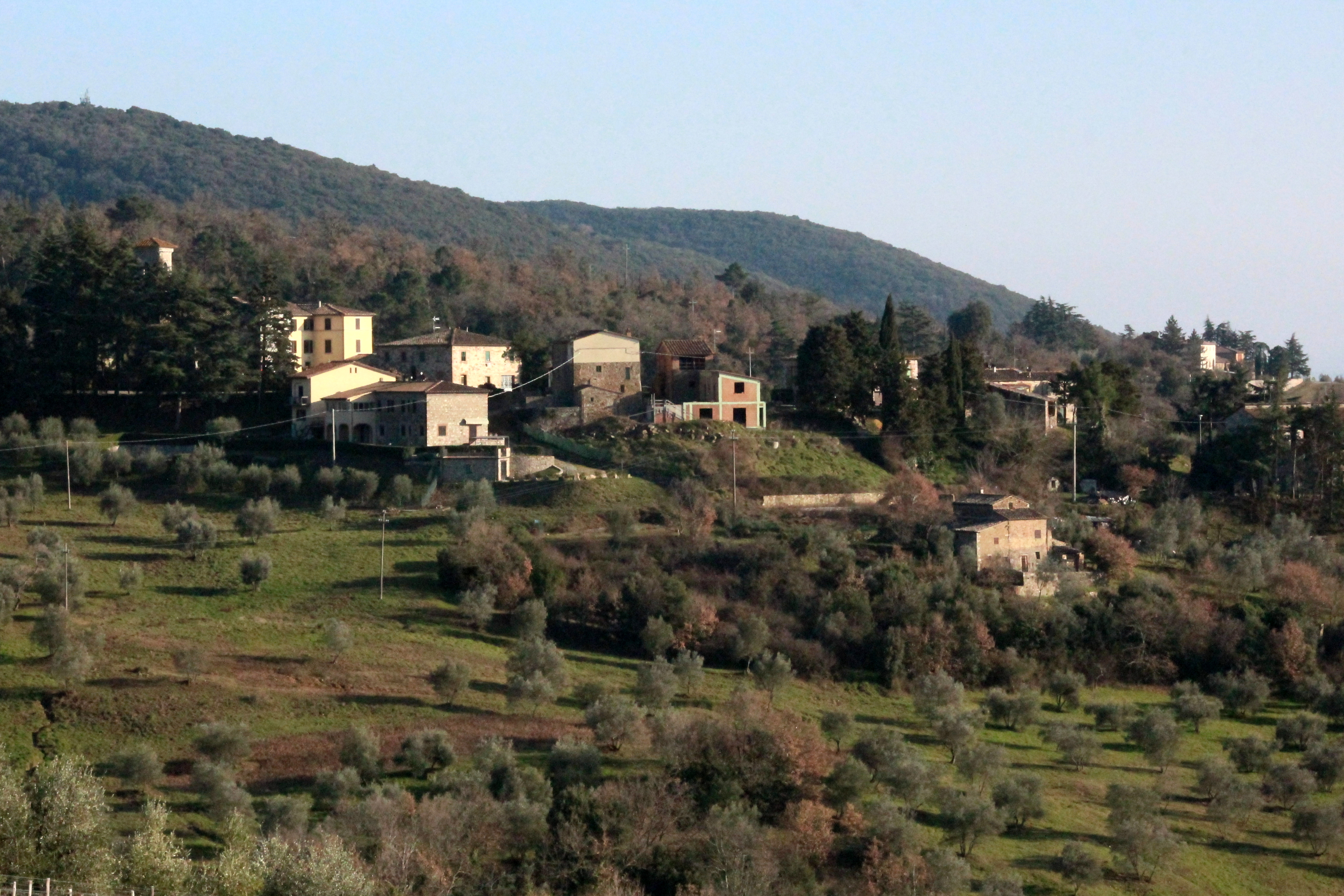
- View of San Regolo

- Location of San Regolo in Italy
- Coordinates: 43°24′40″N 11°27′31″E
- Country: Italy
- Region: Tuscany
- Province: Siena (SI)
- Comune: Gaiole in Chianti
- Elevation: 462 m (1,516 ft)

Population (2011)
  - Total: 73
- Time zone: UTC+1 (CET)
  - Summer (DST): UTC+2 (CEST)

San Regolo is a village in Tuscany, central Italy, administratively a frazione of the comune of Gaiole in Chianti, province of Siena. At the time of the 2001 census its population was 64.

== Main sights ==
- San Regolo (18th century), parish church of the village
- Castello di Brolio
