= Sjriak =

Variety of grape

Sjriak is an Italian red wine grape planted in Tuscany. It is an obscure variety that is rarely encountered but nevertheless allowed for the blend in the Montecarlo DOC.
