= Pomino =

Village in Florence, Italy

Coordinates: 43°48′53.633″N 11°33′0.316″E

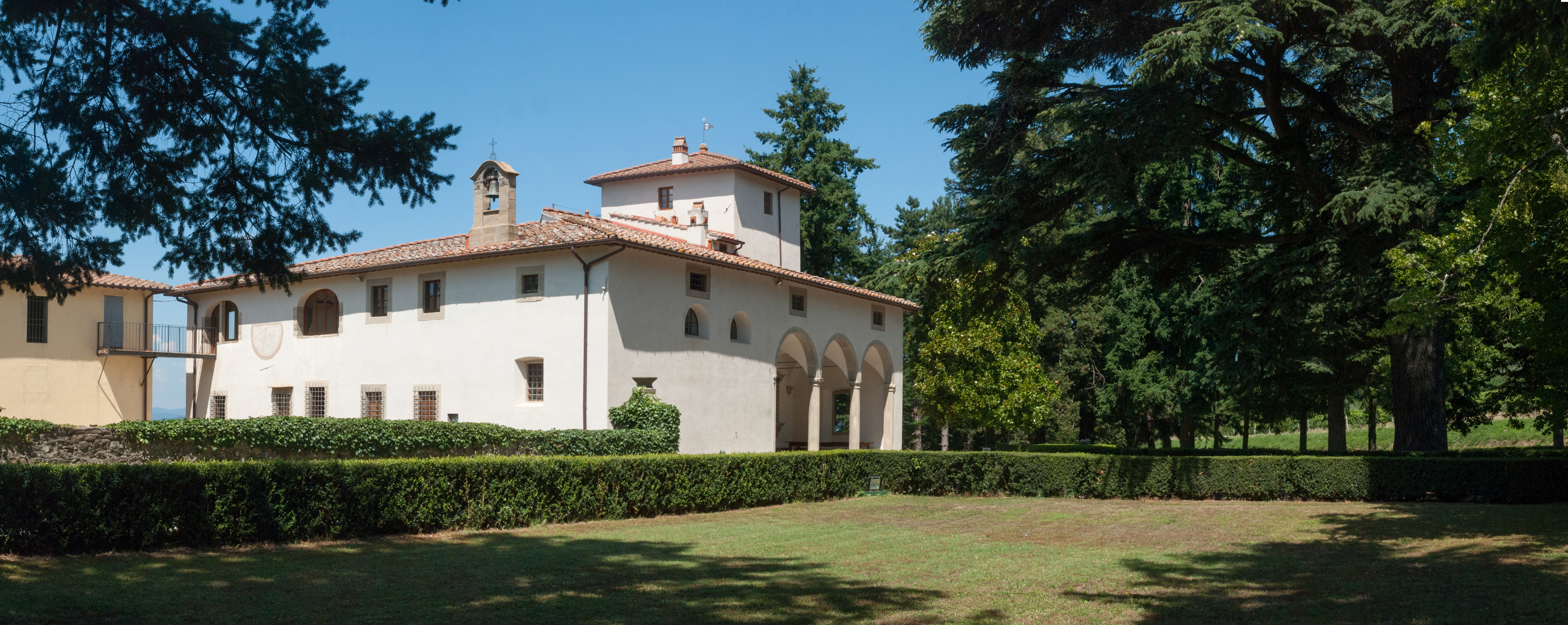

Pomino is a village belongs to the municipality of Rufina, in the province of Florence, Tuscany, Italy. The village of Pomino is 7,36 kilometers far from the same town of Rufina to whom it belongs. The locality of Pomino rises 585 meters above sea level and the population counts 228 inhabitants.

The village of Pomino is most famous for the red and white wine .

== Pomino DOC ==
Created in the early 1970s, the Pomino denominazione di origine controllata (DOC) zone includes red, white and Vin Santo wine production. All grapes destined for DOC wine production must be harvested to a yield no greater than 10.5 tonnes/hectare. The DOC red wine and Vin Santo rosso is a blend of 60–75% Sangiovese, 15–25% collectively of Canaiolo, Cabernet Sauvignon and Cabernet Franc, 10–20% Merlot and up to 15% of other local red grape varieties, such as Abrusco. The finished wine must attain a minimum alcohol level of at least 12% with a separate Riserva bottling permitted provided the minimum alcohol is at least 12.5% and the wine has spent at three years aging prior to release with at least 18 months of that period spent in wood.

The white DOC white wine and Vin Santo bianco is a blend of 60–80% of Pinot blanc and/or Chardonnay, up to 30% Trebbiano Toscano and no more than 15% of other local grape varieties. The minimum alcohol of the finished wine must be at least 11%. Both the bianco and rosso styles of Vin Santo are produced from grapes that have been allowed to dry after harvest with the wine aging at least three years in wood barrels prior to release. The wines can range in sweetness from dry secco to sweet dolce as long as the minimum alcohol for all Vin Santo is at least 15.5%.
