= Montecarlo DOC =

Italian controlled wine origin in Tuscany

Montecarlo is a denominazione di origine controllata (DOC) in northern Tuscany, Italy. The vineyards surround the small town of Montecarlo which is located close to Lucca and Pisa. Montecarlo wines are unusual for the region in that they are commonly made from the Sémillon, Sauvignon blanc and Pinot bianco grape varietals. This is unusual as most Tuscan white wines are made from Trebbiano and Malvasia grapes. Wines from the region are often called the best Tuscan whites.

== DOC Regulations ==
The DOC is defined under the following laws:

Decree	Official Gazette
Dpr 13 Aug 69	283 - 08 Nov 69
Dpr 15 Sept 79	48 - 19 Feb 80
Dpr 01 Oct 85	110 - 14 May 86
Dm 17 Oct 94	253 - 28 Oct 94

The DOC bianco allows between 40% and 60% Trebbiano Toscano, and between 40% and 60% Semillon, Pinot gris, Pinot bianco, Vermentino, Sauvignon blanc and/or Roussane, with no more than 10% of any single one.

The DOC rosso is 50% to 75% Sangiovese, 5% to 15% Canaiolo, 10% to 15% Ciliegiolo, Colorino, Malvasia nera, Sjriak, Cabernet Franc, Cabernet Sauvignon and/or Merlot, and up to 20% other red varietals.
