= Moscadello di Montalcino =

Italian wine

Moscadello di Montalcino is a white Italian wine from the Tuscan wine village of Montalcino.

== Historical background ==
The cultivation of quality Moscadello grapes in Montalcino began during the Renaissance. The Italian oenological historian, Sante Lancerio, who was the wine curator for Pope Paul III, appreciated the characteristics of a golden-looking Moscadello, calling it sweet and pleasant without being excessively sweet. Also, the Italian poet Ugo Foscolo mentioned the dessert wine in one of his letters.

The cultivation of the Moscadello grape vines in Tuscany was almost completely destroyed by the attacks of Phylloxera, and the vineyards were not reconstituted until the end of the 20th century, largely through the use of Moscato bianco grapes originating in Piedmont.

In 1984 the region was awarded denominazione di origine controllata (DOC) status. The 2014 vintage of Moscadello di Montalicino produced nearly 7,300 gallons (275 hectoliters) of DOCG designating wine from a planting of approximately 54 acres (22 ha).

== Recommended matches ==
Moscadello di Montalcino, considering its characteristics, is an excellent wine to accompany fruit, desserts or ice cream.
