= Vino Nobile di Montepulciano =

Wine made in Montepulciano from the Sangiovese grape variety

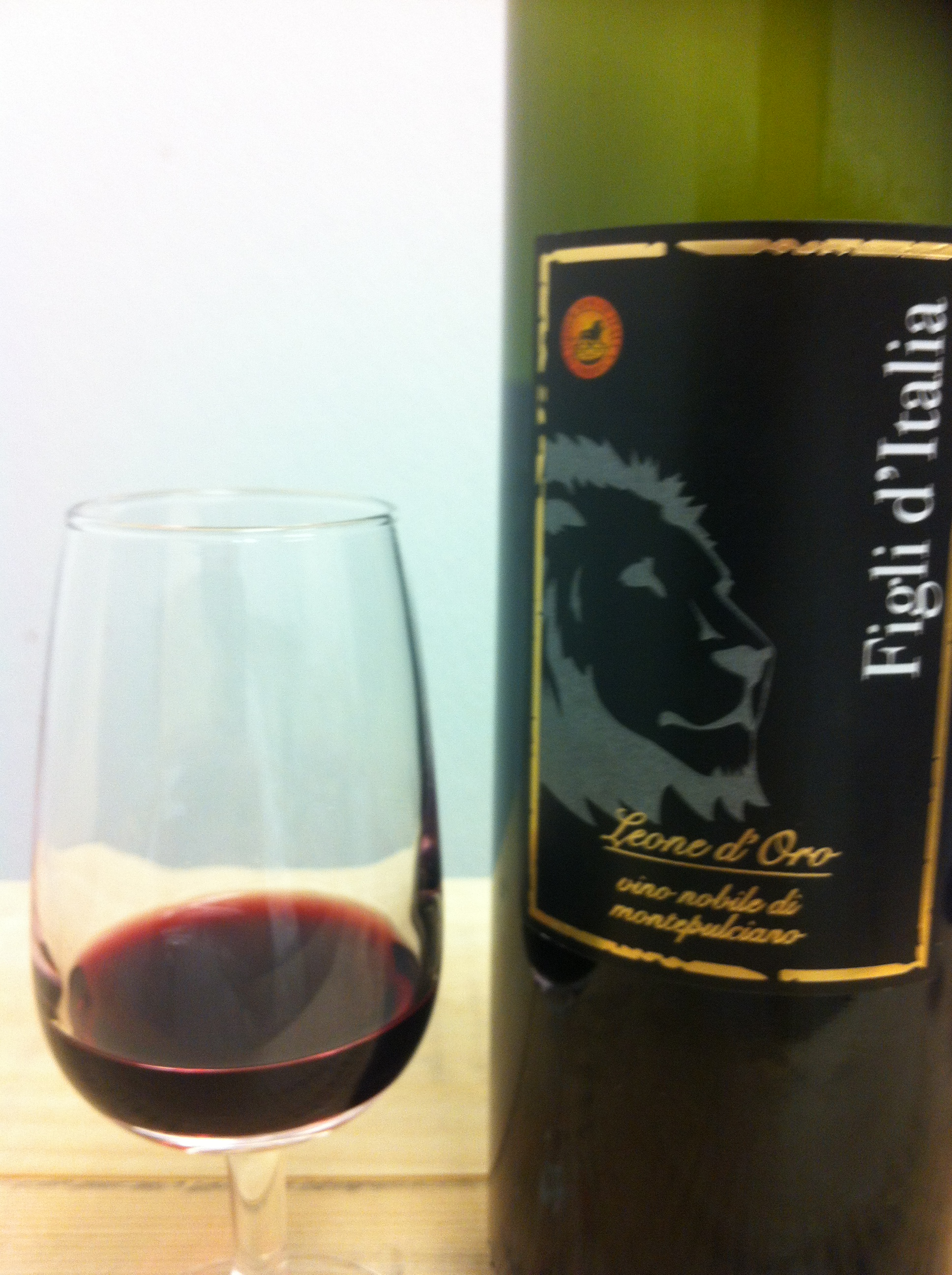
A Vino Nobile di Montepulciano

Vino Nobile di Montepulciano is a red wine with a denominazione di origine controllata e garantita status produced in the vineyards surrounding the town of Montepulciano, Italy. The wine is made primarily from the Sangiovese grape varietal (known locally as Prugnolo gentile) (minimum 70%), blended with Canaiolo Nero (10%–20%) and small amounts of other local varieties such as Mammolo. The wine is aged for 2 years (at least 1 year in oak barrels); three years if it is a riserva. The wine should not be confused with Montepulciano d'Abruzzo, a red wine made from the Montepulciano grape in the Abruzzo region of east-central Italy.

== History ==
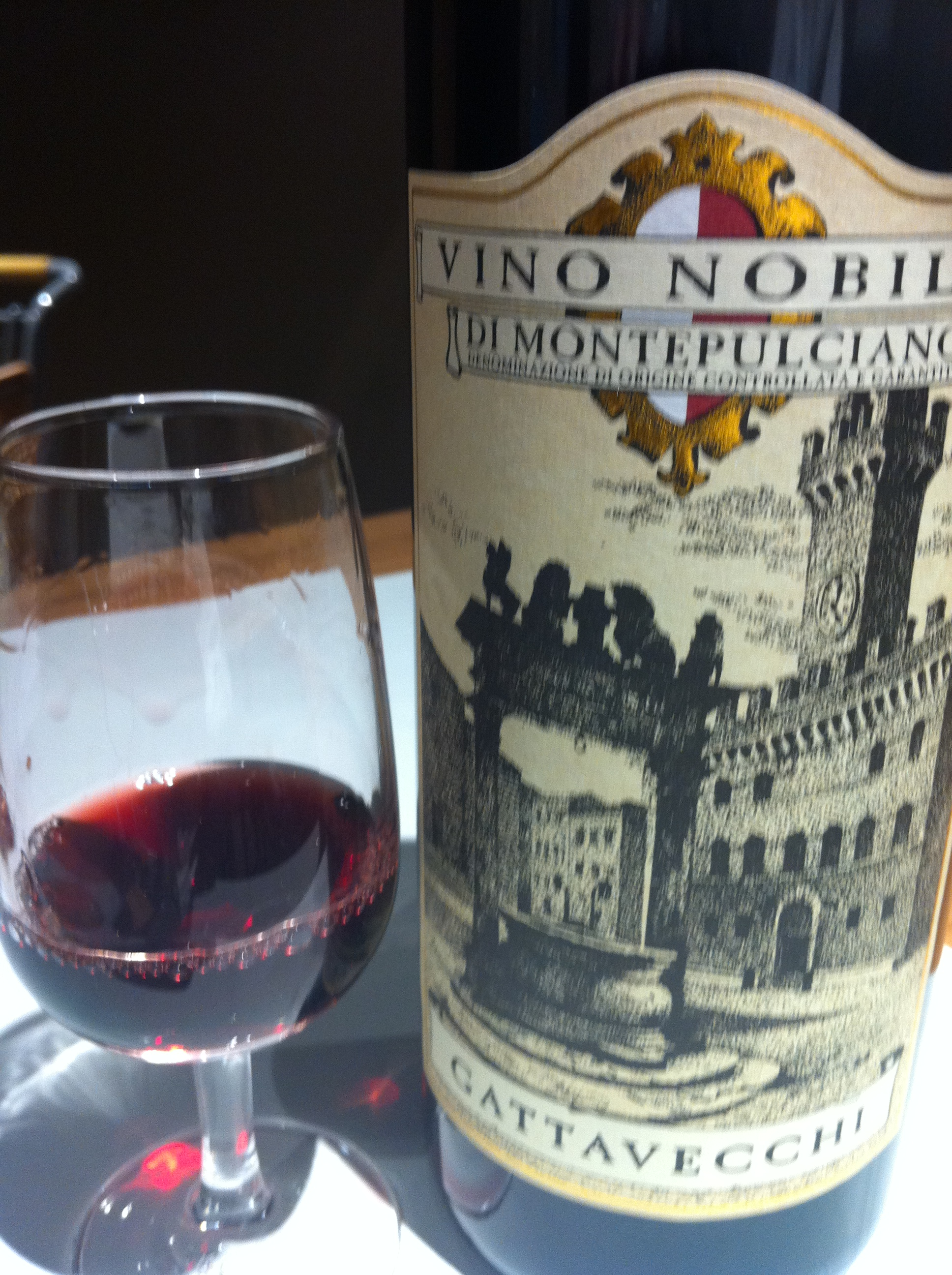
A wine made from the Vino Nobile di Montepulciano DOCG

In a document dated 789, quoted by Emanuele Repetti in "Dizionario Geografico Fisico Storico della Toscana", the cleric Arnipert offers to the Church of San Silvestro in Lanciniano (Amiata area), farmland and a vineyard located in the Castello di Policiano; another document of 17 October 1350, also mentioned by Repetti, lays down the terms for trade and export of a wine produced in the Montepulciano area.

In 1685 Vino Nobile di Montepulciano is also mentioned by the poet Francesco Redi, who, in addition to praising the work of Bacchus in Tuscany ("Montepulciano is the king of all wines!"), wrote an ode to Count Federico Veterani dedicated exclusively to praise of the qualities of this wine.

It is claimed that the name Vino Nobile di Montepulciano was invented by Adamo Fanetti. Until 1930 and beyond, the wine was officially called "Vino rosso scelto di Montepulciano," but Adamo called his wine "nobile" (noble). Yet in New Italian Sketches, published in 1882, John Addington Symonds writes about Montepulciano as the place "where Bacchus, when he visited Tuscany, found the grape-juice that pleased him best and crowned the wine of Montepulciano king":

"We ordered supper, and had the satisfaction of seeing set upon the board a huge red flask of vino nobile. In copious draughts of this the King of Tuscan wines, we drowned our cares. <...> Of all Italian vintages, with the exception of some rare qualities of Sicily and the Valtellina, it is, in my humble opinion, the best. And when the time comes for Italy to develop the resources of her vineyards upon scientific principles, Montepulciano will drive Brolio from the field and take the place by the side of Chianti. It will then be quoted upon wine-lists throughout Europe, and find its place upon the tables of rich epicures in Hyperborean regions, and add its generous warmth to Transatlantic banquets. Even as it is now made, with very little care bestowed on cultivation and none to speak of on selection of the grape, the wine is rich and noble, slightly rough to a sophisticated palate, but clean in quality and powerful and racy."

Symonds also quotes the cardinal Spinello Benci who claimed in the 16th century that the Gauls had been tempted to move south and sack Rome by the wine "which is produced to this day at Montepulciano. For nowhere else in the Etruscan district can wines of equally generous quality and fiery spirit be found, so adapted for export and capable of such long preservation."

In 1925, Adamo Fanetti produced about 30 tons of Nobile, all bottled and sold for two lire a bottle. It was greatly appreciated. Its increased success was seen at the first trade show of wine held in Siena in 1931, organized by Ente Mostra-Mercato Nazionale dei Vini Tipici e Pregiati, when Tancredi Biondi-Santi, a friend and admirer of AFanetti, said prophetically: "This wine will have a future." Fanetti must be considered the first producer of Vino Nobile di Montepulciano. Cantine Fanetti has promoted Vino Nobile di Montepulciano all over the world in the years following World War I, and in the years of the "economic miracle" after World War II. Other companies, which until that date had produced mostly Chianti, followed Adamo's example and in 1937 founded a cantina sociale (Vecchia Cantina di Montepulciano) with the intention of creating a structure for the marketing of wine produced even by small farmers.

The wine produced in Montepulciano continued to be appreciated, and over time it obtained the denominazione di origine controllata (denomination of controlled origin) with DPR July 12, 1966. The denominazione di origine controllata e garantita (denomination of controlled and guaranteed origin) of Vino Nobile di Montepulciano was authorized by DPR July 1, 1980 and modified by DM July 27, 1999.

== Wines made in Montepulciano ==
The industry in the wine-producing town of Montepulciano produces a number of different wines:

- Novello (produced not only in this specific region)
- Rosso di Montepulciano – the wine is made primarily from the Sangiovese grape varietal (known locally as Prugnolo gentile) (minimum 70%), blended with Canaiolo Nero (10%–20%) and small amounts of other local varieties such as Mammolo. The wine is aged in oak barrels for 1 year.
- Nobile di Montepulciano
- Nobile di Montepulciano Riserva
- Grappa – by Italian law, the same company cannot be both a certified winery and a certified distillery, therefore, the grappa is produced in cooperation, but, is usually sold by the winery and bears the winery name on its label.
