= Governo =

Winemaking technique

Governo is a winemaking technique reportedly invented in Tuscany in the 14th century to help complete fermentation and stabilize the wine. The technique involves saving a batch of harvested grapes and allowing them to partially dry. If fermentation of the main batch starts to slow or appears to be nearing stuck fermentation, the half dried grapes are added to the must which then gives the yeast cells a new source of sugar to enliven the batch. From there, the must can be fermented dry or stopped with the wine having a higher level of residual sugar. The process was widely used in the Chianti zones until the advent of temperature controlled fermentation tanks. From Tuscany the technique spread to Marche and Umbria where it is sometimes used today. In the Marche the technique is most often used on wines made from the Verdicchio grape to counteract the grape's natural bitterness and to add some sweetness and frizzante qualities.

== Benefits ==
The benefits of Governo is that it encourages not only fully completed primary fermentation but can also aid in the developing of malolactic fermentation which can help stabilize the wine. With very acidic grapes like Sangiovese this process will temper some of the harshness and volatility in the wine. A by-product of this technique is an increase in carbon dioxide or "fizziness" in the wine as well as increased alcohol content due to the added sugar that the yeast will convert into alcohol.

== See also ==
- History of Chianti
