= Castello di Brolio =

Castle in Tuscany, Italy

Coordinates: 43°24′48″N 11°27′48″E

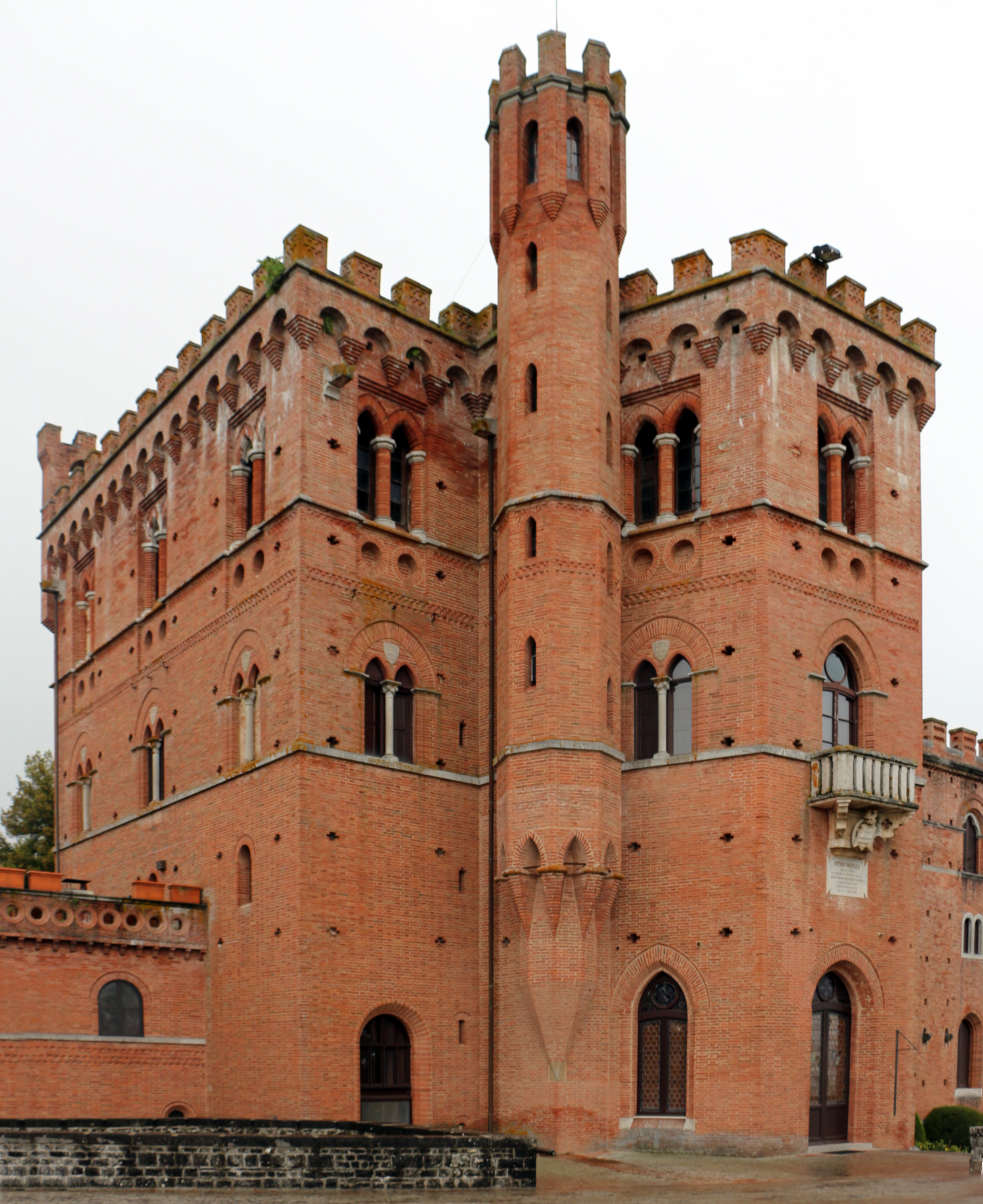
Brolio Castle

The Castello di Brolio is a rural castle, palace and gardens located in San Regolo, in the municipality of Gaiole in Chianti, about 20 km NE of Siena, region of Tuscany, Italy.

The palace has belonged to the Ricasoli family for nearly 800 years. The castle was destroyed more than once during the wars between Siena and Florence. It was rebuilt around the year 1500 after destruction by the Sienese army. Now on a pentagonal plinth, rise both the stone castle and larger brick palace built in Gothic Revival style, mainly under the patronage of Baron Bettino Ricasoli, Prime Minister of the Kingdom of Italy, who created the Chianti recipe of 70% Sangiovese, 15% Canaiolo and 15% Malvasia bianca. In 2015, the site was mainly known for its surrounding wine manufacture, and hosts guided tours.
