= Giovanni Cosimo Villifranchi =

Italian librettist (1646–1699)

Giovanni Cosimo Villifranchi (or Villafranchi, 1646–1699) was, according to Robert Lamar Weaver, "the most productive and creative Italian comic librettist in the second half of the 17th century." He wrote the majority of comic works performed at the Villa Pratolino during the last quarter of the seventeenth century. Villifranchi advocated simplicity in comic language, in opposition to the complex linguistic formality of the commedia erudita practiced by such earlier Florentine authors as Giambattista Ricciardi.
