= List of Italian DOC wines =

This is a list of the 329 Italian DOC (denominazione di origine controllata) wines ordered by region. The wine making regions of Italy are equivalent to its twenty administrative regions. Trentino-Alto Adige/Südtirol, however, is subdivided into its two constituent parts; and some DOCs are split between regions (for instance, Lugana is between Lombardy and Veneto).

== Abruzzo ==
- Abruzzo produced in the provinces of Chieti, L'Aquila, Pescara and Teramo.
- Cerasuolo d'Abruzzo produced in the provinces of Chieti, L'Aquila, Pescara and Teramo.
- Controguerra produced in the province of Teramo.
- Montepulciano d'Abruzzo produced in the provinces of Chieti, L'Aquila, Pescara and Teramo.
- Terre Tollesi or ¨Tullum¨, produced in the province of Chieti.
- Trebbiano d'Abruzzo DOC provinces of Chieti, L'Aquila, Pescara and Teramo.
- Villamagna produced in the province of Chieti.

== Basilicata ==
- Aglianico del Vulture produced in the province of Potenza
- Matera produced in the province of Matera
- Terre dell'Alta Val d'Agri produced in the province of Potenza

== Calabria ==
- Bivongi produced in the provinces of Reggio Calabria and Catanzaro
- Cirò produced in the province of Crotone
- Donnici produced in the province of Cosenza
- Greco di Bianco produced in the province of Reggio Calabria
- Lamezia produced in the province of Catanzaro
- Melissa produced in the province of Crotone
- Pollino produced in the province of Cosenza
- Sant'Anna di Isola Capo Rizzuto produced in the provinces of Crotone and Catanzaro
- San Vito di Luzzi produced in the province of Cosenza
- Savuto produced in the provinces of Cosenza and Catanzaro
- Scavigna produced in the province of Catanzaro
- Verbicaro produced in the province of Cosenza

== Campania ==
- Aversa Asprinio produced in the provinces of Caserta and Napoli
- Campi Flegrei produced in the province of Napoli
- Capri produced in the province of Napoli
- Castel San Lorenzo produced in the province of Salerno
- Cilento produced in the province of Salerno
- Costa d'Amalfi produced in the province of Salerno
- Falerno del Massico produced in the province of Caserta
- Falanghina del Sannio produced in the provinces of Benevento and Avellino
- Galluccio produced in the province of Caserta
- Guardiolo produced in the province of Benevento
- Irpinia produced in the province of Avellino
- Ischia produced in the province of Napoli
- Penisola Sorrentina produced in the province of Napoli
- Sannio produced in the province of Benevento
- Sant'Agata dei Goti produced in the province of Benevento
- Solopaca produced in the province of Benevento
- Taburno produced in the province of Benevento
- Vesuvio produced in the province of Napoli

== Emilia-Romagna ==
- Bosco Eliceo produced in the provinces of Ferrara and Ravenna
- Cagnina di Romagna produced in the provinces of Forlì and Ravenna
- Colli Bolognesi produced in the provinces of Bologna and Modena
- Colli Bolognesi Classico Pignoletto produced in the province of Bologna
- Colli di Faenza produced in the provinces of Forlì and Ravenna
- Colli di Imola produced in the province of Bologna
- Colli di Parma produced in the province of Parma
- Colli di Rimini produced in the province of Rimini
- Colli di Scandiano e di Canossa
- Colli Piacentini produced in the province of Piacenza
- Colli Romagna Centrale produced in the provinces of Ravenna and Forlì
- Gutturnio produced in the province of Piacenza
- Lambrusco di Sorbara produced in the province of Modena
- Lambrusco Grasparossa di Castelvetro produced in the province of Modena
- Lambrusco Salamino di Santacroce produced in the province of Modena
- Modena produced in the province of Modena
- Ortrugo produced in the province of Piacenza
- Pagadebit di Romagna produced in the provinces of Ravenna and Forlì
- Reggiano produced in the province of Reggio Emilia
- Reno produced in the provinces of Bologna and Modena
- Romagna Albana Spumante (Bianco Spumante) produced in the provinces of Bologna, Forlì and Ravenna
- Sangiovese di Romagna produced in the provinces of Bologna, Forlì and Ravenna
- Trebbiano di Romagna produced in the provinces of Bologna, Forlì and Ravenna

== Friuli Venezia Giulia ==
- Carso produced in the provinces of Gorizia and Trieste
- Colli Orientali del Friuli produced in the province of Udine
- Colli Orientali del Friuli Cialla produced in the province of Udine
- Colli Orientali del Friuli Rosazzo produced in the province of Udine
- Collio Goriziano (Collio) produced in the province of Gorizia
- delle Venezie an inter-regional DOC produced in the provinces of Friuli-Venezia Giulia,

Trentino-Alto Adige, and Veneto

- Friuli Annia produced in the province of Udine
- Friuli Aquileia produced in the province of Udine
- Friuli Grave produced in the provinces of Pordenone and Udine
- Friuli Isonzo produced in the province of Gorizia
- Friuli Latisana produced in the province of Udine
- Lison Pramaggiore an inter-regional DOC produced in the provinces of Pordenone (Friuli Venezia Giulia) and Venezia and Treviso (Veneto)

== Lazio ==
- Aleatico di Gradoli produced in the province of Viterbo
- Aprilia produced in the province of Latina
- Atina produced in the province of Frosinone
- Bianco Capena produced in the province of Roma
- Castelli Romani produced in the province of Roma
- Cerveteri produced in the provinces of Roma
- Cesanese del Piglio or Piglio produced in the province of Frosinone
- Cesanese di Affile produced in the province of Roma
- Cesanese di Olevano Romano produced in the province of Roma
- Circeo produced in the province of Latina
- Colli Albani produced in the province of Roma
- Colli della Sabina produced in the provinces of Rieti and Roma
- Colli Etruschi Viterbesi produced in the province of Viterbo
- Colli Lanuvini produced in the province of Roma
- Cori produced in the province of Latina
- Est! Est!! Est!!! di Montefiascone produced in the province of Viterbo
- Frascati produced in the province of Roma
- Genazzano produced in the provinces of Frosinone and Roma
- Marino produced in the province of Roma
- Montecompatri Colonna produced in the province of Roma
- Nettuno produced in the province of Roma
- Orvieto an inter-regional DOC produced in the provinces of Viterbo (Lazio) and Terni (Umbria)
- Roma produced in the province of Roma
- Tarquinia produced in the provinces of Roma and Viterbo
- Terracina or Moscato di Terracina, produced in the province of Latrina
- Velletri produced in the provinces of Latina and Roma
- Vignanello produced in the province of Viterbo
- Zagarolo produced in the province of Roma

== Liguria ==
- Cinque Terre
- Cinque Terre Sciacchetrà produced in the province of La Spezia
- Colli di Luni an inter-regional DOC produced in the provinces of La Spezia (Liguria) and of Massa-Carrara (Toscana)
- Colline di Levanto produced in the province of La Spezia
- Golfo del Tigullio produced in the province of Genova
- Riviera Ligure di Ponente
- Rossese di Dolceacqua
- Val Polcevera produced in the province of Genova
- Pornassio

== Lombardia ==
- Botticino produced in the province of Brescia
- Bonarda dell'Otrepo Pavese produced in the province of Pavia
- Buttafuoco dell'Oltrepo Pavese produced in the province of Pavia
- Casteggio produced in the province of Pavia
- Capriano del Colle produced in the province of Brescia
- Cellatica produced in the province of Brescia
- Garda an inter-regional DOC produced in the provinces of Brescia and Mantova (Lombardia) and Verona (Veneto)
- Garda Colli Mantovani produced in the province of Mantova
- Lambrusco Mantovano produced in the province of Mantova
- Lugana an inter-regional DOC produced in the provinces of Brescia (Lombardia) and Verona (Veneto)
- Oltrepò Pavese produced in the province of Pavia
- Riviera del Garda Bresciano produced in the province of Brescia
- San Colombano al Lambro produced in the provinces of Lodi, Milano and Pavia
- San Martino della Battaglia an inter-regional DOC produced in the provinces of Brescia (Lombardia) and Verona (Veneto)
- Scanzo produced in the province of Bergamo
- Terre di Franciacorta produced in the province of Brescia
- Valcalepio produced in the province of Bergamo
- Valtellina Rosso produced in the province of Sondrio
- Valtenesi produced in the province of Brescia

== Marche ==
- Bianchello del Metauro produced in the province of Pesaro-Urbino
- Colli Maceratesi produced in the province of Macerata
- Colli Pesaresi produced in the province of Pesaro
- Esino produced in the provinces of Ancona and Macerata
- Falerio dei Colli Ascolani produced in the province of Ascoli Piceno
- Lacrima di Morro d'Alba produced in the province of Ancona
- Offida produced in the province of Ascoli Piceno
- Pergola produced in the province of Pesaro e Urbino
- Rosso Conero produced in the province of Ancona
- Rosso Piceno produced in the provinces of Ancona, Ascoli Piceno, Fermo and Macerata
- Verdicchio dei Castelli di Jesi produced in the provinces of Ancona and Macerata
- Verdicchio di Matelica produced in the provinces of Ancona and Macerata

== Molise ==
- Biferno produced in the province of Campobasso
- Molise produced in the provinces of Campobasso and Isernia
- Pentro di Isernia produced in the province of Isernia
- Tintilia produced in the provinces of Campobasso and Isernia

== Piemonte ==
- Albugnano produced in the province of Asti
- Alta Langa produced in the provinces of Alessandria, Asti and Cuneo
- Barbera d'Alba produced in the province of Cuneo
- Barbera d'Asti produced in the province of Asti
- Barbera del Monferrato produced in the provinces of Alessandria and Asti
- Boca produced in the province of Novara
- Bramaterra produced in the provinces of Biella and Vercelli
- Calosso produced in the province of Asti
- Canavese produced in the provinces of Biella, Torino and Vercelli
- Carema produced in the province of Torino
- Cisterna d'Asti produced in the provinces of Asti and Cuneo
- Colli Tortonesi produced in the province of Alessandria
- Collina Torinese produced in the province of Torino
- Colline Novaresi produced in the province of Novara
- Colline Saluzzesi produced in the province of Cuneo
- Cortese dell'Alto Monferrato produced in the provinces of Alessandria and Asti
- Coste della Sesia produced in the provinces of Biella and Vercelli
- Dolcetto d'Acqui produced in the province of Alessandria
- Dolcetto d'Alba produced in the province of Cuneo
- Dolcetto d'Asti produced in the province of Asti
- Dolcetto delle Langhe Monregalesi produced in the province of Cuneo
- Dolcetto di Diano d'Alba produced in the province of Cuneo
- Dolcetto di Dogliani produced in the province of Cuneo
- Dolcetto di Ovada produced in the province of Alessandria
- Erbaluce di Caluso produced in the provinces of Biella, Torino and Vercelli
- Fara produced in the province of Novara
- Freisa d'Asti produced in the province of Asti
- Freisa di Chieri produced in the province of Torino
- Gabiano produced in the province of Alessandria
- Grignolino d'Asti produced in the province of Asti
- Grignolino del Monferrato Casalese produced in the province of Alessandria
- Langhe produced in the province of Cuneo
- Lessona produced in the province of Biella
- Loazzolo produced in the province of Asti
- Malvasia di Casorzo d'Asti produced in the provinces of Alessandria and Asti
- Malvasia di Castelnuovo Don Bosco produced in the provinces of Alessandria and Asti
- Monferrato produced in the provinces of Alessandria and Asti
- Nebbiolo d'Alba produced in the province of Cuneo
- Piemonte produced in the provinces of Alessandria, Asti and Cuneo
- Pinerolese produced in the provinces of Cuneo and Torino
- Rubino di Cantavenna produced in the province of Alessandria
- Ruché di Castagnole Monferrato produced in the province of Asti
- Sizzano produced in the province of Novara
- Valsusa produced in the province of Torino
- Verduno Pelaverga produced in the province of Cuneo

== Puglia ==
- Aleatico di Puglia produced throughout the region
- Alezio produced in the province of Lecce
- Barletta produced in the province of Barletta-Andria-Trani
- Brindisi produced in the province of Brindisi
- Cacc'e mmitte di Lucera produced in the province of Foggia
- Castel del Monte produced in the province of Bari
- Colline Joniche Taratine produced in the province of Taranto
- Copertino produced in the province of Lecce
- Galatina produced in the province of Lecce
- Gioia del Colle produced in the province of Bari
- Gravina produced in the province of Bari
- Leverano produced in the province of Lecce
- Lizzano produced in the province of Taranto
- Locorotondo produced in the provinces of Bari and Brindisi
- Martina produced in the provinces of Bari, Brindisi and Taranto
- Matino produced in the province of Lecce
- Moscato di Trani produced in the provinces of Bari and Foggia
- Nardò produced in the province of Lecce
- Negroamaro di Terra d'Otranto produced in the province of Lecce
- Orta Nova produced in the province of Foggia
- Ostuni produced in the province of Brindisi
- Primitivo di Manduria produced in the provinces of Brindisi and Taranto
- Rosso Barletta produced in the provinces of Bari and Foggia
- Rosso Canosa produced in the province of Bari
- Rosso di Cerignola produced in the province of Bari
- Salice Salentino produced in the provinces of Brindisi and Lecce
- San Severo, produced in the province of Foggia
- Squinzano produced in the provinces of Brindisi and Lecce
- Tavoliere delle Puglie or "Tavoliere", produced in the provinces of Foggia and Barletta-Andria-Trani
- Terra d'Otranto produced in the provinces of Brindisi, Lecce and Taranto

== Sardegna ==
- Alghero produced in the province of Sassari
- Arborea produced in the province of Oristano
- Campidano di Terralba produced in the provinces of Cagliari and Oristano
- Cannonau di Sardegna produced throughout the region
- Carignano del Sulcis produced in the province of Cagliari
- Girò di Cagliari produced in the provinces of Cagliari and Oristano
- Malvasia di Bosa produced in the province of Nuoro
- Malvasia di Cagliari produced in the provinces of Cagliari and Oristano
- Mandrolisai produced in the provinces of Nuoro and Oristano
- Monica di Cagliari produced in the provinces of Cagliari and Oristano
- Monica di Sardegna produced throughout the region
- Moscato di Cagliari produced in the provinces of Cagliari and Oristano
- Moscato di Sardegna produced throughout the region
- Moscato di Sorso Sennori produced in the province of Sassari
- Nasco di Cagliari produced in the provinces of Cagliari and Oristano
- Nuragus di Cagliari produced in the provinces of Cagliari, Nuoro and Oristano
- Sardegna Semidano produced throughout the region
- Vermentino di Sardegna produced throughout the region
- Vernaccia di Oristano produced in the province of Oristano

== Sicilia ==
- Alcamo produced in the provinces of Palermo and Trapani
- Contea di Sclafani produced in the provinces of Agrigento, Caltanissetta and Palermo
- Contessa Entellina produced in the province of Palermo
- Delia Nivolelli produced in the province of Trapani
- Eloro produced in the provinces of Ragusa and Siracusa
- Erice produced in the province of Trapani
- Etna produced in the province of Catania
- Faro produced in the province of Messina
- Malvasia delle Lipari produced in the province of Messina
- Mamertino di Milazzo produced in the province of Messina
- Marsala produced in the province of Trapani
- Menfi produced in the provinces of Agrigento and Trapani
- Monreale produced in the province of Palermo
- Noto produced in the province of Agrigento
- Moscato di Pantelleria produced in the province of Trapani
- Moscato di Siracusa produced in the province of Siracusa
- Riesi produced in the province of Caltanissetta
- Salaparuta produced within the communal territory of Salaparuta in the province of Trapani
- Sambuca di Sicilia produced in the province of Agrigento
- Santa Margherita di Belice produced in the province of Agrigento
- Sciacca produced in the province of Agrigento
- Siracusa produced in the province of Siracusa
- Vittoria produced in the provinces of Caltanisetta, Catania and Ragusa

== Toscana ==
- Ansonica Costa dell'Argentario produced in the province of Grosseto
- Barco Reale di Carmignano produced in the provinces of Firenze and Prato
- Bianco della Valdinievole produced in the province of Pistoia
- Bianco dell'Empolese produced in the provinces of Firenze and Pistoia
- Bianco di Pitigliano produced in the province of Grosseto
- Bianco Pisano di San Torpè produced in the province of Pisa
- Bianco Vergine della Valdichiana produced in the provinces of Arezzo and Siena
- Bolgheri produced in the province of Livorno
- Candia dei Colli Apuani produced in the province of Massa-Carrara
- Capalbio produced in the province of Grosseto
- Colli dell'Etruria Centrale produced in the provinces of Arezzo, Firenze, Pisa, Pistoia, Prato and Siena
- Colli di Luni an inter-regional DOC produced in the provinces of Massa-Carrara (Toscana) and of La Spezia (Liguria)
- Colline Lucchesi produced in the province of Lucca
- Cortona produced in the province of Arezzo
- Elba produced in the province of Livorno
- Maremma Toscana produced in the province of Grosseto
- Montecarlo produced in the province of Lucca
- Montecucco produced in the province of Grosseto
- Monteregio di Massa Marittima produced in the province of Grosseto
- Montescudaio produced in the provinces of Livorno and Pisa
- Moscadello di Montalcino produced in the province of Siena
- Orcia produced in the province of Siena
- Parrina produced in the province of Grosseto
- Pomino produced in the province of Firenze
- Rosso di Montalcino produced in the province of Siena
- Rosso di Montepulciano produced in the province of Siena
- San Gimignano produced in the province of Siena
- Sant'Antimo produced in the province of Siena
- Sovana produced in the province of Grosseto
- Val d'Arbia produced in the province of Siena
- Vin Santo del Chianti produced in the provinces of Arezzo, Firenze, Pisa, Pistoia, Prato and Siena
- Vin Santo del Chianti Classico produced in the provinces of Firenze and Siena
- Vin Santo di Montepulciano produced in the province of Siena

== Trentino-Alto Adige/Südtirol ==
=== South Tyrol ===
Wines from South Tyrol have official designations in both the Italian and German languages. Labels typically use the German form.

- Südtirol, or Südtiroler (Italian: Alto Adige) produced in South Tyrol
- Kalterersee, or Kalterer) (Italian: Lago di Caldaro, or Caldaro) a DOC produced both in the provinces of South Tyrol and Trentino
- Valdadige an inter-regional DOC produced in the provinces of South Tyrol, Trentino and Verona
- Santa Maddalena, produced in South Tyrol

=== Trentino ===
- Casteller produced in the province of Trentino
- delle Venezie an inter-regional DOC produced in the provinces of Friuli-Venezia Giulia,

Trentino-Alto Adige, and Veneto

- Teroldego Rotaliano produced in the province of Trentino
- Trentino produced in the province of Trentino
- Trento a sparkling wine produced in the province of Trentino
- Lago di Caldaro or Caldaro (German: Kalterersee or Kalterer) a DOC produced both in the provinces of South Tyrol and Trentino
- Valdadige an inter-regional DOC produced in the provinces of South Tyrol, Trentino and Verona (Veneto)

== Umbria ==
- Amelia produced in the province of Terni
- Assisi produced in the province of Perugia
- Colli Altotiberini produced in the province of Perugia
- Colli Amerini produced in the province of Terni
- Colli del Trasimeno produced in the province of Perugia
- Colli Martani produced in the province of Perugia
- Colli Perugini produced in the provinces of Perugia and Terni
- Lago di Corbara produced in the provinces of Perugia and Terni
- Montefalco produced in the province of Perugia
- Orvieto an inter-regional DOC produced in the provinces of Terni (Umbria) and Viterbo (Lazio)
- Rosso Orvietano produced in the province of Terni
- Spoleto produced in the province of Perugia
- Todi produced in the province of Perugia
- Torgiano produced in the province of Perugia

== Valle d'Aosta/Vallée d'Aoste ==
Wines from Aosta Valley have official designations in French.

- Valle d'Aosta

== Veneto ==
- Arcole produced in the provinces of Verona and Vicenza
- Bagnoli di Sopra produced in the province of Padova
- Bardolino produced in the province of Verona
- Bianco di Custoza produced in the province of Verona
- Breganze produced in the province of Vicenza
- Colli Berici produced in the province of Vicenza
- Colli di Conegliano produced in the province of Treviso
- Colli Euganei produced in the province of Padova
- Corti Benedettine del Padovano produced in the provinces of Padova and Venezia
- delle Venezie an inter-regional DOC produced in the provinces of Friuli-Venezia Giulia,

Trentino-Alto Adige, and Veneto

- Fiol Prosecco produced in the province of Treviso
- Gambellara produced in the province of Vicenza
- Garda an inter-regional DOC produced in the provinces of Verona (Veneto) and Brescia and Mantova (Lombardia)
- Lison Pramaggiore an inter-regional DOC produced in the provinces of Venezia and Treviso (Veneto) and Pordenone (Friuli Venezia Giulia)
- Lugana an inter-regional DOC produced in the provinces of Verona (Veneto) and Brescia (Lombardia)
- Merlara produced in the province of Padova
- Montello e Colli Asolani produced in the province of Treviso
- Monti Lessini produced in the province of Vicenza
- Piave produced in the provinces of Treviso and Venezia
- Prosecco produced in the province of Treviso
- Riviera del Brenta produced in the provinces of Padova and Venezia
- San Martino della Battaglia an inter-regional DOC produced in the provinces of Verona (Veneto) and Brescia (Lombardia)
- Soave produced in the province of Verona
- Valdadige an inter-regional DOC produced in the provinces of Verona (Veneto) and of Bolzano and Trento (Trentino-Alto Adige/Südtirol)
- Valpolicella produced in the province of Verona
- Valpolicella Ripasso produced in the province of Verona
- Venezia produced in the provinces of Venezia and Treviso
- Vicenza produced in the province of Vicenza
- Vin Santo di Gambellara produced in the province of Vicenza

== See also ==
- List of Italian DOCG wines
- List of Italian IGT wines
- Italian wine
