= List of Italian DOCG wines =

This is a list of the 77 Italian DOCG (denominazione di origine controllata e garantita) wines ordered by region. The four original DOCGs were Brunello, Vino Nobile, and Barolo (all approved by a presidential decree in July 1980) and Barbaresco (as approved in October 1980).

== Northern regions ==
=== Emilia-Romagna ===
- Albana di Romagna (Bianco as secco or asciutto, amabile, dolce, passito and passito riserva), produced in the provinces of Bologna, Forlì-Cesena and Ravenna
- Colli Bolognesi Pignoletto, produced in the province of Bologna

=== Friuli-Venezia Giulia ===
- Ramandolo (Bianco), produced in the province of Udine, in the area of Ramandolo, in the commune of Nimis, Italy and in part of the comune of Tarcento
- Colli Orientali del Friuli Picolit (Passito), produced in the province of Udine
- Rosazzo, produced in the province of Udine

=== Lombardia ===
- Franciacorta (as Spumante, Spumante rosé and Spumante cremant), produced in the province of Brescia
- Oltrepo Pavese Metodo Classico (as Rosé, Cremant, Pinot Noir, Pinot Noir Rosé), produced in the province of Pavia
- Moscato di Scanzo or "Scanzo", produced in the province of Bergamo
- Sforzato di Valtellina or Sfurzat di Valtellina (Rosso), produced in the province of Sondrio
- Valtellina Superiore (Rosso as normale and Riserva) with the option to indicate one of the sub-regions Inferno, Grumello, Maroggia, Sassella and Valgella, produced in the province of Sondrio, or the sub-region Stagaflassi for wine bottled in Switzerland

=== Piemonte ===
- Asti in the sub-appellations Asti (Bianco) and Moscato d'Asti (Bianco), produced in the provinces of Asti, Cuneo and Alessandria
- Barbaresco (Rosso as normale and Riserva), produced in the province of Cuneo
- Barbera d'Asti (Rosso as normale and Superiore), produced in the province of Asti, with the option to indicate one of the sub-regions
  - Tinella in the region surrounding Costigliole d'Asti
  - Colli Astiani in the region surrounding Vigliano d'Asti
- Nizza, produced in the region surrounding Nizza Monferrato. Formerly a sub-region of Barbera d'Asti, it was promoted to DOCG in 2014
- Barbera del Monferrato Superiore (Rosso), produced in the provinces of Asti and Alessandria
- Barolo (Rosso as normale, Riserva and Chinato), produced in the province of Cuneo
- Brachetto d'Acqui or Acqui (Rosso as normale and Spumante), produced in the provinces of Asti and Alessandria
- Dolcetto di Dogliani Superiore or Dogliani (Rosso), produced in the province of Cuneo
- Dolcetto di Ovada Superiore or Ovada (Rosso), produced in the province of Alessandria
- Gattinara (Rosso as normale and Riserva), produced in the province of Vercelli
- Gavi or Cortese di Gavi (Bianco as Frizzante, Spumante and Tranquillo), produced in the province of Alessandria
- Ghemme (Rosso as normale and Riserva), produced in the province of Novara
- Roero (Bianco as Roero Arneis and Roero Arneis Spumante, Rosso as normale and Riserva), produced in the province of Cuneo
- Erbaluce di Caluso or Caluso (Bianco), produced in the province of Turin
- Dolcetto di Diano d'Alba or Diano d'Alba (Rosso), produced in the province of Cuneo
- Ruché di Castagnole Monferrato (Rosso), produced in the province of Asti
- Alta Langa (Sparkling, traditional method), produced in the provinces of Alessandria, Asti and Cuneo

=== Veneto ===
- Amarone della Valpolicella
- Bagnoli Friularo or "Friularo di Bagnoli"
- Bardolino Superiore (Rosso), produced in the province of Verona
- Colli di Conegliano, produced in the province of Treviso
- Colli Euganei Fior d'Arancio or "Fior d'Arancio Colli Euganei", produced in the Padua
- Asolo Prosecco or sometimes "Colli Asolani Prosecco" before 2014, produced in the province of Treviso
- Conegliano Valdobbiadene Prosecco, produced in the province of Treviso
- Lison, produced in the province of Treviso and straddling the border with Friuli
- Montello Rosso, produced in the province of Treviso
- Piave Malanotte or "Malanotte del Piave", produced in the Piave area
- Recioto di Soave (Bianco as normale, Classico and Spumante), produced in the province of Verona
- Soave Superiore (Bianco as normale, Classico and Riserva), produced in the province of Verona
- Recioto di Gambellara (Bianco)
- Recioto della Valpolicella

== Central regions ==
=== Abruzzo ===
- Colline Teramane Montepulciano d'Abruzzo, produced in a subregion of Montepulciano d'Abruzzo in the Teramo province
- Terre Tollesi, located near the middle of Abruzzo's coastline.
- Terre di Casauria DOCG, grown in the province of Pescara.

=== Lazio ===
- Cannellino di Frascati, a sweet dessert wine, produced in the province of Roma
- Cesanese del Piglio or "Piglio", grown in the Prenestina hills southeast of Rome. Red, some sparkling is produced.
- Frascati Superiore, produced in the province of Roma

=== Marche ===
- Castelli di Jesi Verdicchio Riserva, produced in the province of Ancona
- Conero (Rosso only as Riserva), produced in the province of Ancona
- Offida, produced in the province of Ascoli Piceno
- Vernaccia di Serrapetrona (Rosso as Dolce and Secco), produced in the province of Macerata
- Verdicchio di Matelica Riserva, produced in the province of Matelica

=== Toscana ===
- Brunello di Montalcino (Rosso as normale and Riserva), produced in the province of Siena
- Carmignano (Rosso as normale and Riserva), produced in the provinces of Firenze and Prato
- Chianti (Rosso as normale and Riserva), in the provinces of Arezzo, Firenze, Pisa, Pistoia, Prato and Siena; with the option to indicate one of the sub-regions:
  - Colli Aretini as normale and Riserva produced in the province of Arezzo
  - Colli Senesi as normale and Riserva, produced in the province of Siena
  - Colli Fiorentini as normale and Riserva, produced in the province of Firenze
  - Colline Pisane as normale and Riserva, produced in the province of Pisa
  - Montalbano as normale and Riserva, produced in the provinces of Firenze, Pistoia and Prato
  - Montespertoli as normale and Riserva, produced in the province of Firenze
  - Rufina as normale and Riserva, produced in the province of Firenze
  - Chianti Superiore, produced throughout the Chianti region with the exception of the classico sub-region.
- Chianti Classico became a separate DOCG in 1996. Chianti Classico was originally established as a sub-region of the Chianti DOC in 1967, which became a DOCG in 1984. Chianti Classico DOCG has different regulations from Chianti DOCG, the percentage of Sangiovese used in Chianti Classico DOCG is at least 80% compared to 70% to 75% that of Chianti DOCG. White varietal is prohibited in Chianti Classico DOCG while it can be used in Chianti DOCG.
- Elba Aleatico Passito produced in the Livorno
- Montecucco produced in the province of Grosseto
- Morellino di Scansano (Rosso as normale and Riserva), produced in the province of Grosseto
- Suvereto produced in the province of Livorno
- Val di Cornia produced in the province of Livorno and Pisa
- Vernaccia di San Gimignano (Bianco as normale and Riserva), produced in the province of Siena
- Vino Nobile di Montepulciano (Rosso as normal and Riserva), produced in the province of Siena

=== Umbria ===
- Sagrantino di Montefalco (Rosso as Secco and Passito), produced in the province of Perugia
- Torgiano Rosso Riserva (Rosso only as Riserva), produced in the province of Perugia

== Southern regions ==
=== Basilicata ===
- Aglianico del Vulture Superiore, produced in the province of Potenza

=== Campania ===
- Aglianico del Taburno, produced in the province of Benevento
- Fiano di Avellino (bianco), produced in the province of Avellino using the Fiano grape.
- Greco di Tufo (bianco, also as spumante), produced in the province of Avellino
- Taurasi (rosso also as Riserva), produced in the province of Avellino

=== Puglia ===
- Castel del Monte Bombino Nero, produced in the provinces of Bari and Foggia
- Castel del Monte Nero di Troia Reserva, produced in the provinces of Bari and Foggia
- Castel del Monte Rosso Riserva, produced in the provinces of Bari and Foggia
- Primitivo di Manduria Dolce Naturale, produced in the province of Taranto

=== Sardinia ===
- Vermentino di Gallura (Bianco as normale and Superiore), produced in the province of Gallura

=== Sicilia ===
- Cerasuolo di Vittoria (Rosso as normale and Classico), produced in the provinces of Caltanissetta, Catania and Ragusa

== See also ==
- List of Italian DOC wines
- List of Italian IGT wines
- Italian wine
