= Abruzzo wine region =

Italian wine region

Abruzzo
- Wine region
- Type: Italian wine
- Year established: 1968
- Years of wine industry: 1968–present
- Country: Italy
- Soil conditions: Clay, limestone, marl
- Grapes produced: 70% red varieties, 30% white varieties
- Varietals produced: Red: Montepulciano, Sangiovese, Merlot, Cabernet Sauvignon; White: Trebbiano, Pecorino, Passerina, Chardonnay, Moscato
- Official designations: 3 DOCG: Montepulciano d'Abruzzo Colline Teramane, Terre Tollesi, Terre di Casauria DOCG; 10+ DOCs including Montepulciano d'Abruzzo, Trebbiano d'Abruzzo, Cerasuolo d'Abruzzo; Several IGTs including Abruzzo IGT

Location of Abruzzo wine region in Italy

Abruzzo (historically pl.: Abruzzi) is an Italian wine region located in the mountainous central Italian region of Abruzzo, along the Adriatic Sea. It is bordered by the Molise wine region to the south, Marche to the north and Lazio to the west. Abruzzo's rugged terrain, 65% of which is mountainous, help to isolate the region from the winemaking influence of the ancient Romans and Etruscans in Tuscany, but the area has had a long history of wine production.

Today more than 22 million cases of wine are produced annually in Abruzzo, making it the fifth most productive region in Italy, but only 21.5% of which is made under the denominazione di origine controllata (DOC) designation. More than two-thirds of the region's wine is produced by co-operatives or sold in bulk to negociants in other Italian wine regions in Tuscany, Piedmont and the Veneto for blending. The most notable wine of the region is Montepulciano d'Abruzzo, produced with the Montepulciano grape, that is distinct from the Sangiovese grape behind the Tuscan wine Vino Nobile di Montepulciano. Together with Trebbiano d'Abruzzo, Montepulciano d'Abruzzo is one of the most widely exported DOC wine from Italy, particularly to the United States.

While wine is produced in all four of Abruzzo's provinces, the bulk of the production takes place in the province of Chieti, which is the fifth largest producing province in all of Italy. Some of the most highly rated wine from Abruzzo comes from the hillside vineyards in the northern provinces of Pescara and Teramo. In the completely mountainous province of L'Aquila in the west, some rosé wine known as Cerasuolo from the Montepulciano grape is produced.

== Climate and geography ==
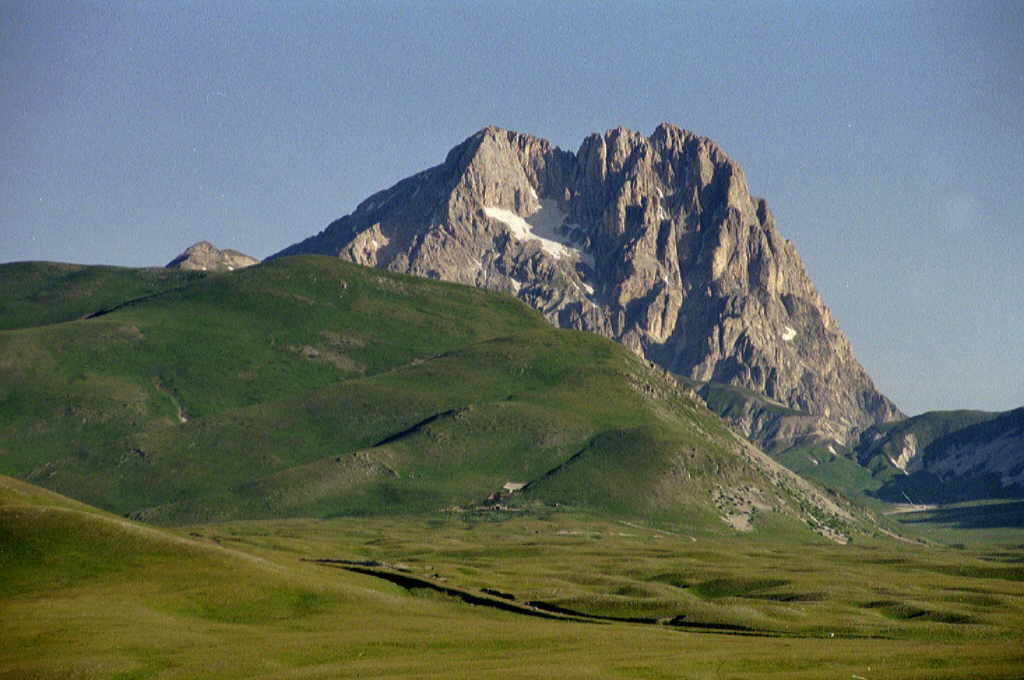
The mountainous Abruzzo region includes the highest peak in the Italian Apennines, Corno Grande.

The Abruzzo region has the Apennines running along its western border and includes Corno Grande, the highest point on mainland Italy outside of The Alps. The mountain range serves as a tempering influence on the climate, blocking many storms that come in from the west. However, this does leave the area prone to storm systems originating from the east, which are blocked in their westward progression by the mountains, causing high levels of precipitation to fall on the vineyards, as happened during several rain soaked vintages of the late 1990s.

To the east, the Adriatic Sea provides a moderating Mediterranean climate for the vineyards that run along a west–east orientation in calcareous clay river valleys that flow from the mountains to the seas. In the northern region of Abruzzo, along the Marche border, the microclimates, vineyard soils and altitude of many vineyards are similar to other central Italian wine regions in Tuscany, Umbria and Marche, while the warmer, flatter, more humid and fertile vineyard sites in the southern Chieti have microclimates more similar to southern Italian wine regions like Calabria and Apulia.

== Viticulture and grapes ==
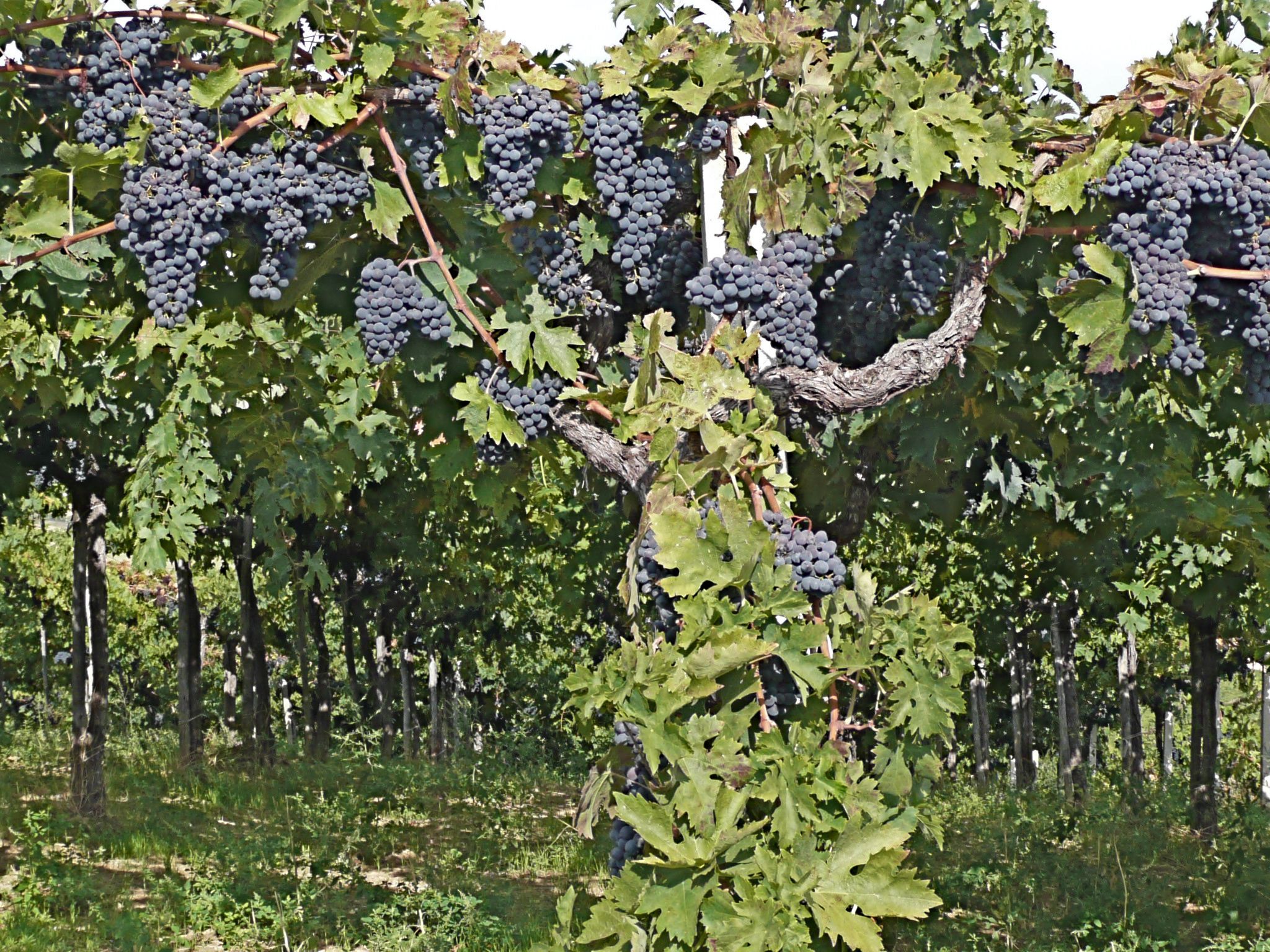
Montepulciano grapes in Abruzzo

Despite the mountainous region of Abruzzo having only half of the vineyard land of regions like Tuscany, the region still produces more than 22 million cases of wine annually. This is partly because of the high permitted yields of Abruzzo's main DOC region (as much as 100 hectoliters/hectare) as well as the government mandated use of high-producing tendone vine-training systems, installed in the 1970s. Particularly on the fertile hillsides and plain of the southern Chieti province, vineyards warmed by the dry Adriatic breezes during the summer can produce prodigious yields. Of all the provinces in Italy, Chieti is the fifth largest producer of wine in Italy.

The dominant varieties of the region are the red Montepulciano (grape) and the white Trebbiano d'Abruzzo grape, which was once considered a clone of the "insipid" Trebbiano Toscano. Trebbiano d'Abruzzo is thought not to be a version of Trebbiano at all, but the southern Italian white grape Bombino bianco. Both Trebbiano Toscano and Bombino bianco are still widely planted in Abruzzo with field blends including all 3 varieties labeled as Trebbiano d'Abruzzo still common.

While the Montepulciano d'Abruzzo grape has no known relationship to the Tuscan wine village of Montepulciano or the Sangiovese grape behind the wines of Vino Nobile di Montepulciano, it was thought of for a time, in the 19th century, that the Montepulciano grape and Sangiovese may be related. While this relationship has proven false, it is still not known how the dominant grape of Abruzzo took the name of the Renaissance era town.

== Winemaking ==
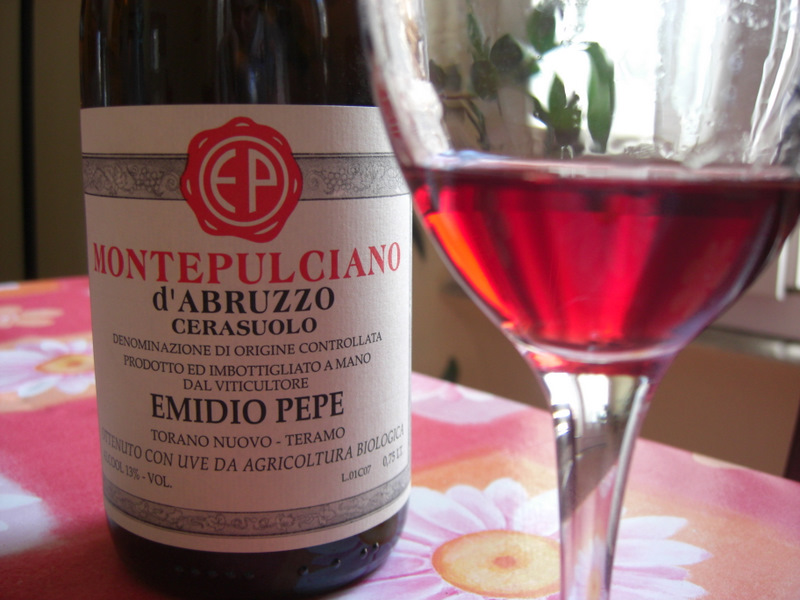
A Cerasuolo rosé made from the Montepulciano grapes from Abruzzo producer Emidio Pepe

Nearly 80% of all the wine in the Abruzzo region is produced by large co-operative wineries with the four largest – Cantina Tollo, Casal Thaulero, Casal Bordino and Citra – dominating wine production in the region. In addition to making the majority of Abruzzo labeled wine, these large co-ops also sell wine to other Italian and French wine regions, where they are used for blending. According to wine experts Joe Bastianich and David Lynch, a "good part" of many "better-regarded" French and northern Italian wines come from Abruzzo.

In the late 20th and early 21st century, there has been a trend away from the co-operatives towards growers starting their own boutique or artisanal wineries. Two early proponents of this movement were Emidio Pepe for the province of Teramo, Santoleri for the province of Chieti sub-area Crognaleto (Guardiagrele) and Edoardo Valentini for the province of Pescara (who is described by Bastianich and Lynch as the "Angelo Gaja of Abruzzo" and by Master of Wine Mary Ewing-Mulligan as the "Lord of the Vines"), who brought innovative styles of winemaking to the region that combines traditional and modern techniques.

Pepe incorporates some elements of traditional winemaking, including crushing his organically grown grapes by foot, similar to the traditional Port wine tradition of using a large stone vats called lagares to tread on wine grapes. He also shuns the use of any fining and filtration aids, as well as the use of the sulfur dioxide for preserving and protecting the wine oxidation. However, instead of using oak barrels or stainless steel fermentation tanks, Pepe ferments and ages everything in glass (from using glass lined fermentation vessels, to storing the wine in bottles). When the wines are ready to be released, they are decanted off their sediments and repackaged in a new wine bottle.

Valentini and the new wave of artisanal winemakers often utilize extensive pruning, green harvesting, and low crop yields in the vineyard. As well, as extended maceration for red wines, and oak aging for whites to produce wines that have received some critical acclaim. According to Matt Kramer, Valentini's Trebbiano d'Abruzzo maybe "Italy's single greatest dry white wine". Wine expert Jancis Robinson describes it as "one of Italy's most distinctive dry white wines".

=== Wines ===
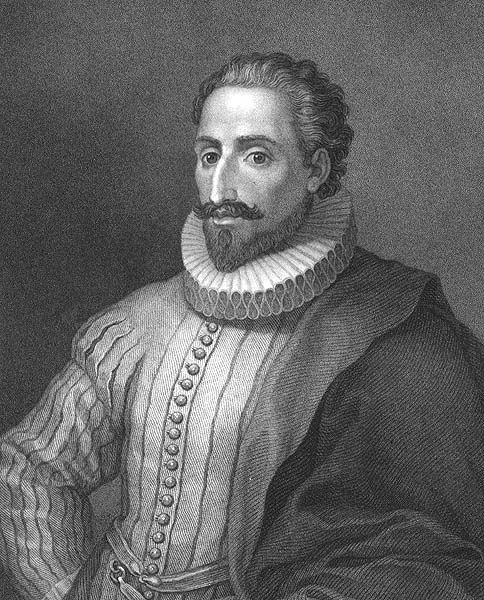
The wines of the Abruzzo region were internationally known as early as the 17th century, when the Spanish writer Miguel de Cervantes praised the high quality of the region's Trebbiano d'Abruzzo.

Widely grown throughout Abruzzo and central Italy (and believed by some ampelographers to be indigenous to the region), Montepulciano is the fifth most widely planted red grape variety in Italy – behind Sangiovese, Barbera, Merlot, and Negroamaro. In Abruzzo, it is the principal grape behind the DOC wine Montepulciano d'Abruzzo, where the grape is noted for producing darkly colored, tannic wines, with low acidity and some aging potential. According to wine expert Matt Kramer, well made examples from favorable vintages can be inky-black, with "fjord-like depth of fruit" and soft, sweet tannins that are never astringent, unless the wine extracted too many tannins from prolong exposure to oak. Jancis Robinson notes that some examples of Montepulciano can exhibit a reductive character, likely due to the high levels of phenolics in the grape variety.

While Montepulciano d'Abruzzo is produced in all four provinces of Abruzzo, nearly two-thirds comes from the Chieti province, though many of the more critically acclaimed versions come from the lower yields and less fertile ferrous clay and limestone vineyards of the northern Teramo and Pescara provinces.

From the mountainous province of L'Aquila, a rosé made from Montepulciano called Cerasuolo is a specialty of the region. These deep cherry pink wines get their color from the highly pigmented Montepulciano grape, that requires only a very brief period (sometimes less than a day) of maceration time prior to pressing. According to wine experts Bastianich and Lynch, these wines tend to be "heartier" than typical rosés, with exotic spice aromas along with dried cherry, orange peel, strawberry and cinnamon notes. Matt Kramer describes Cerasuolo as "one of the world's great rosé".

In the Controquerra DOC, stretched out among five communes near the Marche, border in northern Abruzzo, a novello style wine is produced from grapes that at least 30% of which has undergone carbonic maceration (a technique used in the French wine region of Beaujolais for the wine Beaujolais nouveau). This produces a very fruity wine with low tannins, that can be consumed soon after the vintage.

The major white wine of the region is produced by the Trebbiano d'Abruzzo, and Trebbiano Toscano grapes (the later is often labeled simply Trebbiano. The wine gained fame in the early 17th century when it was praised for its high quality by the Spanish writer Miguel de Cervantes in his work Novelas ejemplares. These wines tend to be low in extract and acidity, with faint aromatics that can be lightly floral. However, Trebbiano d'Abruzzo tends to be much more complex when compared to Trebbiano Toscano. When produced with some oak, and often blended with Chardonnay, Bastianich and Lynch note that the wines can have a creamy richness with pear and apple flavors and slight oxidized notes of caramel and nuts.

== DOCS and other wine regions ==
- Colline Teramane DOCG – created in 1995 as a DOC and elevated to DOCG status in 2003. This wine is produced from grapes grown only among 30 select communes in the province of Teramo. While harvest, aging and alcohol levels regulations are similar to the Montepulciano d'Abruzzo DOC, the wine must be made from at least 90% Montepulciano with no more than 10% of Sangiovese permitted in the wine.
- Terre Tollesi DOCG – established as a DOC in 2008. This wine is elevated to DOCG in 2019. It allows a wide variety of grapes to be produced. White: Trebbiano d'Abruzzo, Trebbiano Toscana, Falanghina, Malvasia, Moscato, Passerina, and Chardonnay. Red: Montepulciano, Sangiovese, Cabernet Sauvignon, Merlot.
- Terre di Casauria DOCG - is a DOCG wine product in province of Pescara.

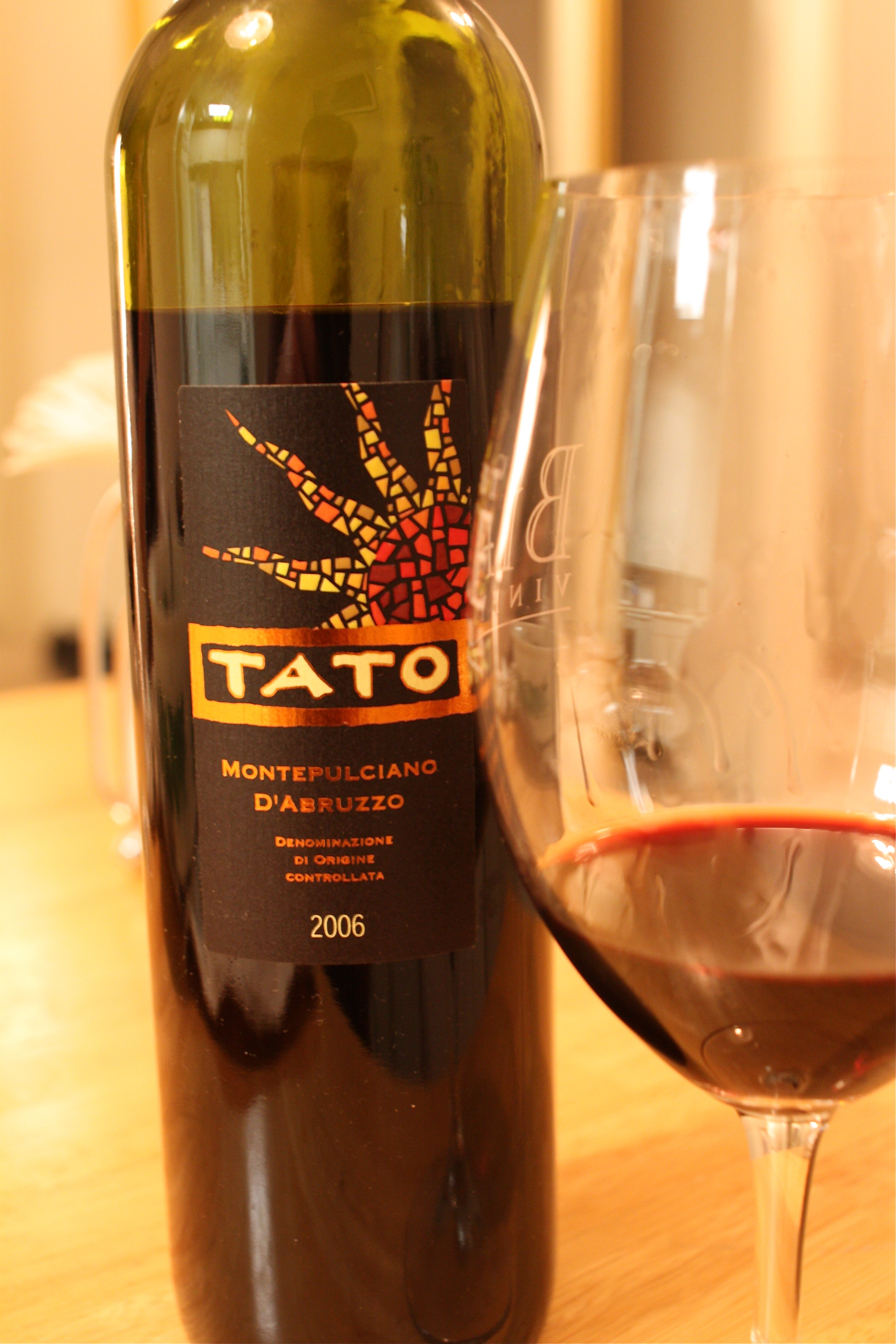
A wine from the Montepulciano d'Abruzzo DOC

Abruzzo has approximately 30,000 hectares of vineyards planted in the region, with roughly half devoted to DOC production.

- Abruzzo DOC – created in 2010
- Controguerra DOC – created in 1996 and located in the hills and valleys around the commune of Controguerra (whose name means "anti-war" in the local dialect) in the Teramo province. Until its creation, the Trebbiano d'Abruzzo DOC was the only permitted white wine DOC in Abruzzo. Reds are made predominately from the Montepulciano grape (minimum 60% of the wine) with Merlot, Cabernet Sauvignon and Cabernet franc permitted to make up to 15% and other local red varieties the remaining 25%. Whites are a blend of Trebbiano Toscano (60-70%) and Passerina (15%) with other local white varieties permitted up to 25%. A sparkling spumante style is produced from Trebbiano Toscano (60%) and at least 30% combine of Chardonnay, Verdicchio and Pecorino, with other local white varieties permitted up to 10%. Passito and vino novello styles of wine can also be produced in this DOC as well as varietal Cabernet Sauvignon, Cabernet franc, Merlot, Chardonnay, Ciliegiolo and Pinot nero.
- Montepulciano d'Abruzzo DOC – created in 1968 as a red/rosé wine only DOC that covers 7,500 hectares throughout Abruzzo. The wines are made from at least 85% Montepulciano with Sangiovese permitted up to 15%. In the sub-zones of Casauria and Terre dei Vestini the wines must be made from 100% Montepulciano. The wines must be aged a minimum of 5 months prior to release. Wines labeled as Vecchio aged at least two years in wood, such as oak barrels. Rosés made under the same DOC requirements as the reds (grape varieties, harvest yield and alcohol level) are labeled as Cerasuolo, meaning "cherry-red".
- Trebbiano d'Abruzzo DOC – created in 1972 as white wine DOC that covers virtually the entire Abruzzo region. This DOC has one of the highest permitted yields in all of Italy, at 17.5 hl/ha. The wine is made from the Trebbiano d'Abruzzo grape (local name for Bombino bianco, but may be another grape variety) and Trebbiano Toscano, which was once thought to be the same grape as Trebbiano d'Abruzzo, must account for at least 85% of the blend with Malvasia Toscano, Cococciola and Passerina permitted to make up to 15% of the blend. The wines must be aged a minimum of 5 months prior to release and attain a minimum alcohol level of at least 11.5%.
- Villamagna DOC – established as a red wine DOC in 2011. As of 2014 it covers 32 hectares with 172 hl of wine produced. Red: Montepulciano.
- Ortona DOC – established as a DOC in 2011. As of 2014 it covers 18 hectares with 100 hl of wine produced. White: Trebbiano d'Abruzzo or Trebbiano Toscana. Red: Montepulciano.

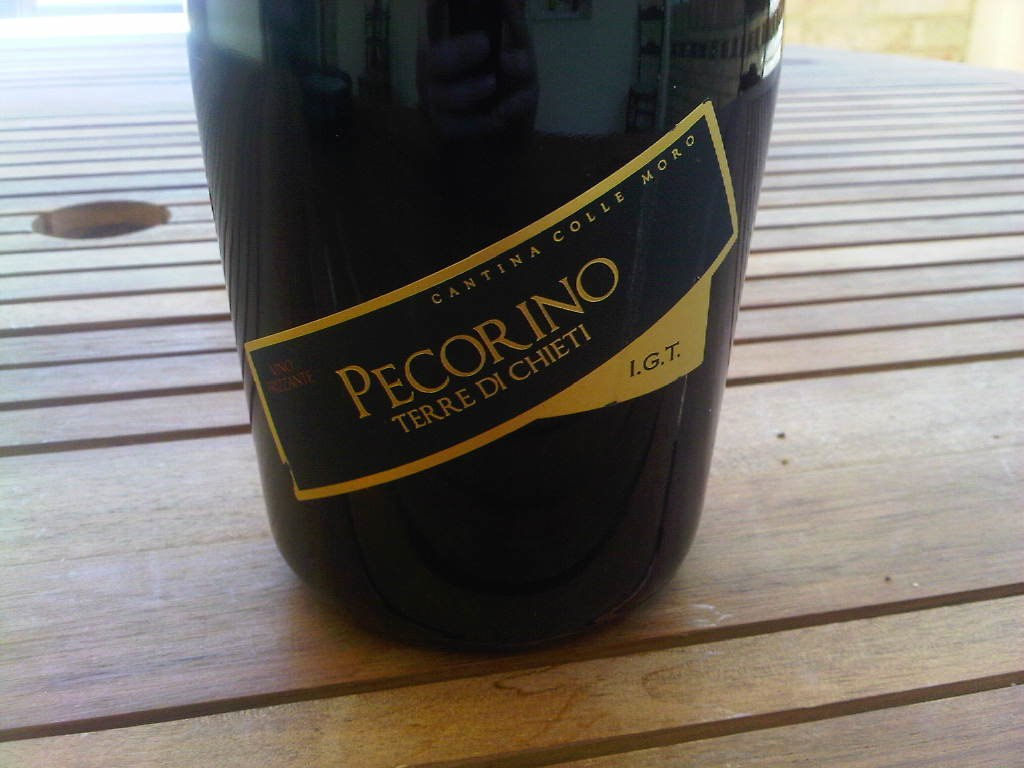
A semi-sparkling frizzante Pecorino from the Terre di Chieti IGT in Abruzzo

In addition to the region's DOCs, Abruzzo is also home to eight indicazione geografica tipica (IGT) designations—Alto Tirino, Colli del Sangro, Colline Frentane, Colline Pescaresi, Colline Teatine, Vastese (also known as Histonium), Terre di Chieti and Valle Peligna. Many producers use these IGT to produce proprietary red blends, using more international varieties like Cabernet Sauvignon and Merlot.
