= Sovana DOC =

Italian controlled wine origin in Tuscany

Sovana is a denominazione di origine controllata red or rosé wine from the south of Tuscany, in Italy. The DOC is named after the ancient Etruscan settlement of Sovana. Sovana received DOC status in 1999, along with its neighbor, the DOC Capalbio. Sovana encompasses roughly the same areas that produce the white wine Bianco di Pitigliano, and encompasses the towns of Pitigliano, Sorano, Manciano and borders the DOC Morellino di Scansano in the north, and the region of Lazio in the south.

Under the DOC regulations, Sovana can be made in rosso or rosato styles. Sovana rosso must be at least 50% sangiovese, plus up to 50% other local non aromatic red grapes. One of these local grapes used for the Sovana blend is Ciliegiolo. Sovana rosso is for the most part a light wine, although there are reserva wines that receive extended maturation. Sovana also allows monovarietal DOC wines, made from the grapes of Aleatico, Sangiovese, Cabernet Sauvignon or Merlot. These wines must contain at least 85% of the varietal in order to allow it to be stated on the bottle #e.g., Sovana Merlot DOC#. Up to 15% of other authorized grapes may be used in the blend.
