= Tenimenti Luigi d'Alessandro =

Winery in Tuscany

- Formation: 1967
- Headquarters: Cortona, Arezzo, Italy
- Location: Cortona, Arezzo, Italy
- Coordinates: 43.275063°N 11.98512°E
- Owner: Giuseppe Calabresi
- Owner: Massimo d'Alessandro
- Affiliations: Club Syrah, Club Friends of Tenimenti d'Alessandro, Natura delle Cose
- Website: http://tenimentidalessandro.it/
- Formerly called: none

Tenimenti Luigi d'Alessandro is a winery located in Tuscany, Italy. It was founded in 1967 by the d'Alessandro family, which purchased around 200 acres of the Manzano Farm in Cortona, a medieval town in the southern-east part of Tuscany.

== History ==
The history of the Manzano Farm dates back to the 17th century, when wine was produced in the Chiana Valley (Val di Chiana) in the Cortona area. Until the 19th century, the land owners were two aristocratic families originally from Florence: the Diligenti and the Magi families.

The modern history of the Manzano Farm begins with the establishment of the Tenimenti Luigi d'Alessandro winery in 1967. At that time, the wine production in Cortona consisted of blended or inexpensive wine only. In 1988, conceived by Prof. Attilio Scienza at The University of Milan, 10 acres of Syrah were planted as an experiment in order to determine the vine-growing potential of the area. Four years later, after deeply studying the soil and the climate, selecting the best clones from the Rhone Valley and evaluating the finest winemaking techniques, Syrah was recognized as the perfect varietal in expressing the subtle link between the plant and the soil. This excellent connection between Syrah and the Val di Chiana terroir was formally recognized in 1999, when the Cortona area achieved the D.O.C. (Denominazione di origine controllata) status.

From 1993 to 2003 Tenimenti Luigi d'Alessandro gradually planted 80 acres of Syrah and Viognier, producing around 100.000 bottles per year that are sold in the main markets of the world.

Today the Syrah is considered as an authentic local Cortona wine and the production of the Tenimenti Luigi d'Alessandro winery represents one of the quality benchmarks for all Italian Syrah.

== Production ==
The wine production of the Tenimenti Luigi d'Alessandro winery consists of both red and white wines. Made from 100% syrah grapes, the red wines are:

- Borgo Syrah - Cortona Syrah DOC

The Borgo Syrah wine consists of Syrah grapes planted between 1997 and 2002 with a variable density ranging from 7.000 to 8.500 plants per hectare. The wine is the result of harvesting the youngest vineyards and meets the objective in terms of fruitiness purity, generosity and fullness. From the perspective of wine management, this wine is different from Il Bosco by a greater plant productivity (around 1 kg.) and for the mechanisation of certain operations. The vinification process provide for stainless steel and concrete vats for 12 months.

- Il Bosco - Cortona Syrah D.O.C.

Il Bosco is produced from Syrah grapes selected from the three oldest hillside vineyards – Il Bosco (the forest), I Cani (the dogs) and Pozzo Vecchio (the old well) – planted between 1988 and 1995, with a density of 7.000 vines per hectare. The vineyards are situated at 280/300m above sea level. Every hectare of the four vineyards produces about 50 quintals of grapes with a corresponding yield of roughly 800 kilograms per plant. Entirely manual, the harvest begins around the second week of September. The wine spends 24 months in oak (30% new) between barriques and bigger wooden cask, plus 12 months of bottle aging before bottling.

- Migliara - Cortona Syrah D.O.C

Migliara is produced from Syrah grapes selected only in I Cipressi (the cypress) vineyard. This vineyard is located at a height of 300m above mean sea level. It was planted in 2000 at a high density of 8500 plants per hectare. Around 2500 bottles are produced from the 3 acres single-vineyard. The wine spends 24 months in oak (30% new) between barriques and bigger wooden cask, plus 12 months of bottle aging before bottling.

Made from 100% Viognier grapes, the white wines are:

- Bianco del Borgo

Bianco del Borgo was produced for the first time in 2010. It is made with Viognier grapes only, harvested in the Fontarca clayey vineyards. Its finishing in steel tanks, after a short stay in barrels for six months. The vinification process provide for stainless steel vats for 8/10 months.

- Fontarca

Fontarca wine is made with 100% Viognier grapes. These were first planted in 1989 at a density of 7.000 plants per hectare and more recently, in 2005, at a density of 8,500 plants. The Viognier vineyards are located at an altitude of between 290 and 300 meters height above sea level. The 2000 bottles produced spend 12 months in oak (50% new) between barriques and a truncated cone vat.

== Media ==
Freberg Production: Interview with Massimo d’Alessandro by the Frebergs Wine from Sweden.

== See also ==
- Italian wine
- List of Italian DOC wines
- Cortona
