= Nuragus (grape) =

Variety of grape

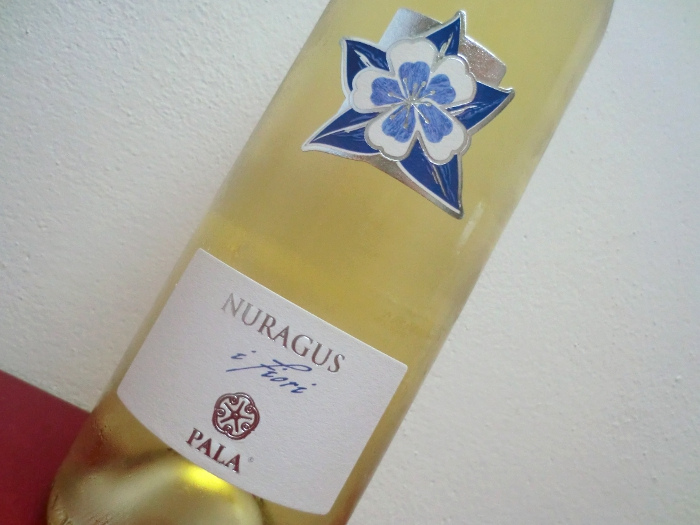
A Nuragus wine from Sardinia.

Nuragus is a white Italian wine grape variety that is grown in Sardinia. It is the principle variety between the Denominazione di origine controllata wine Nuragus di Cagliari. The grape has a long history on the island with ampelographers believing that the variety was likely introduced to the area by the Phoenicians. While the grape is still widely planted in Sardinia its numbers began to dwindle in the late 20th century, falling by 50% during the 1980s alone to a total of 8,700 hectare (21,500 acres) in 1990. Today it is mostly found in the southern part of the island between Cagliari and Oristano on the hot Campidano plain.

== DOC wines ==
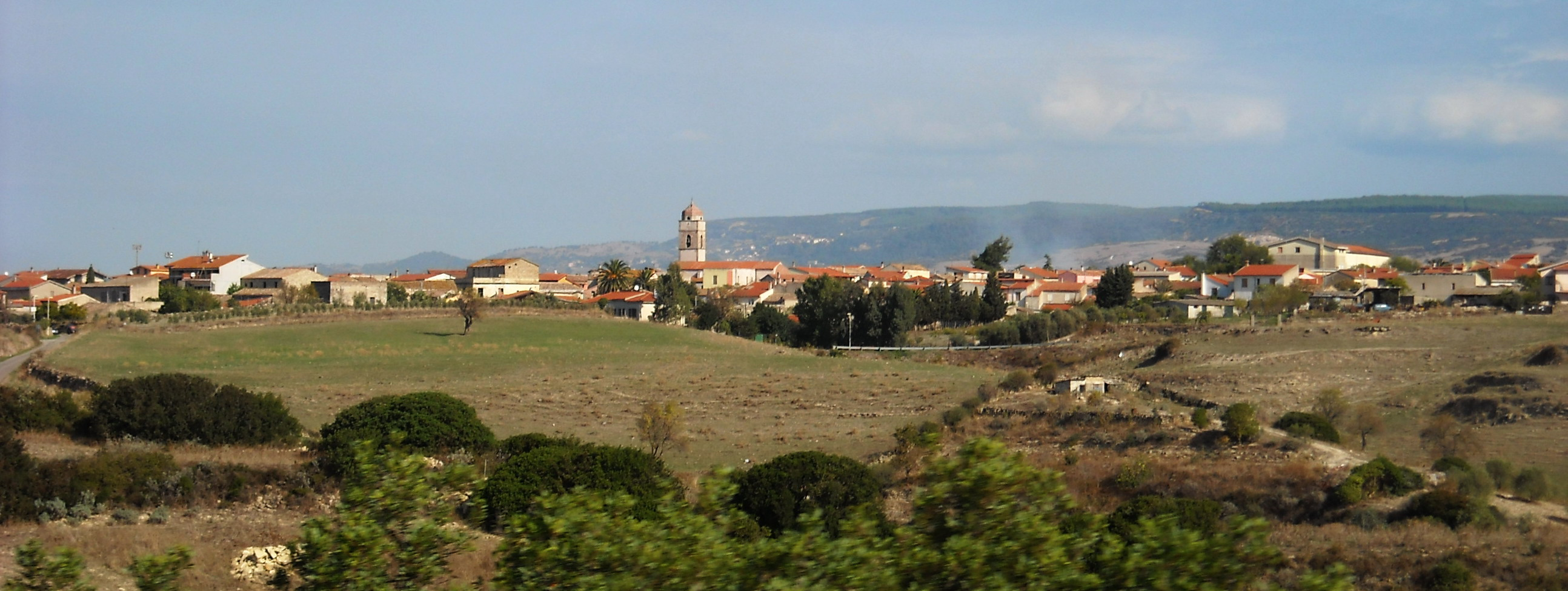
The commune of Nuragus in the province of Cagliari from which the Nuragus grapes gets its name.

Under Italian wine laws Nuragus grown in southern Sardinia are permitted to be labeled under the Nuragus di Cagliari DOC provided the grape makes up at least 85% of the blend with other local white grape varieties permitted to make up the remaining portion of the wine. The DOC has the highest permitted harvest yield or any Italian wine at a maximum of 20 tonnes/hectare. The finished wine must attain a minimum alcohol level of at least 10.5% and a semi-sparkling frizzante style is also allowed under the DOC.

== Wine styles ==
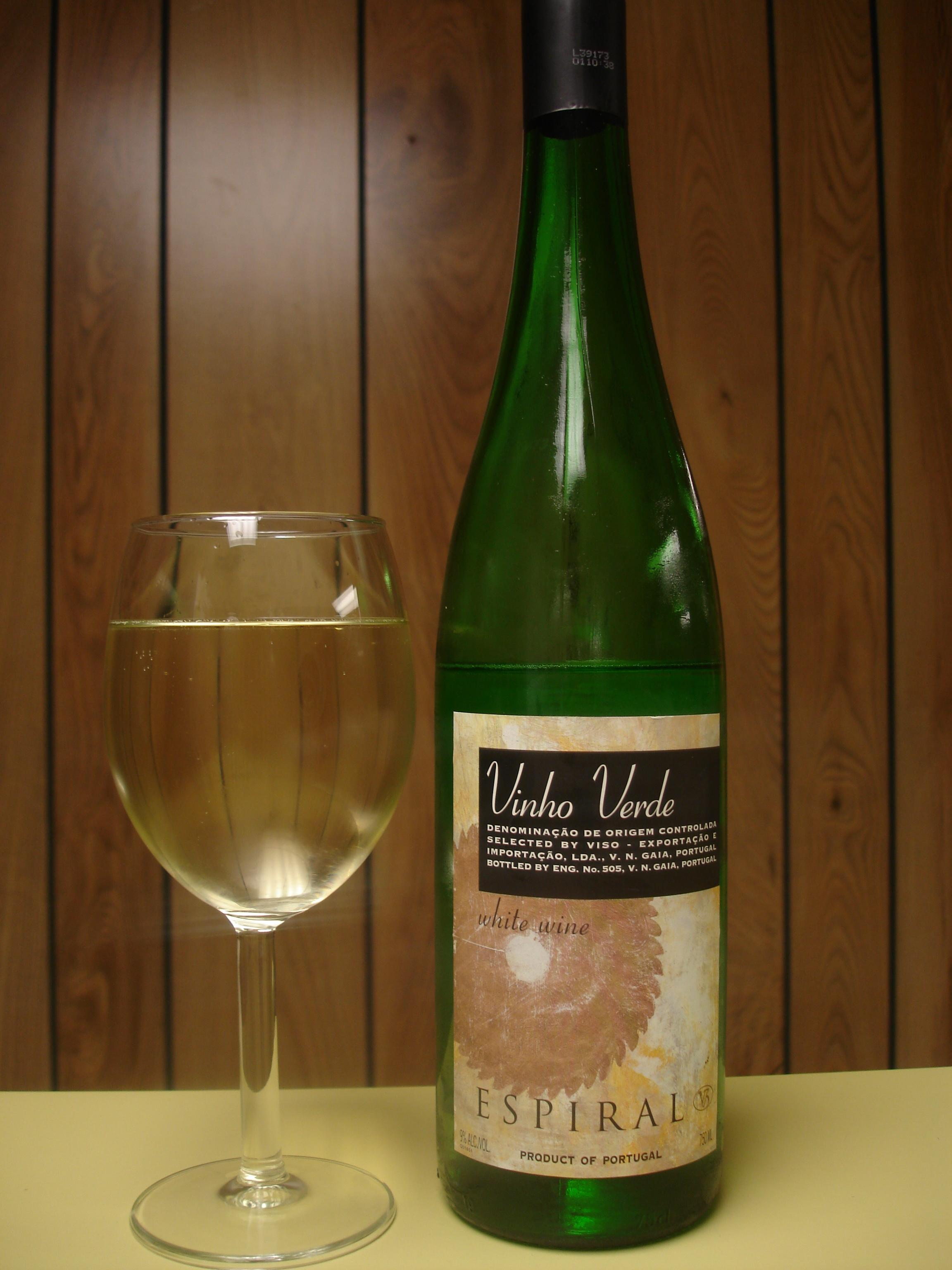
According to some wine experts, the light, neutral flavors and high acidity of Nuragus is reminiscent of the Vinho Verde wines from northern Portugal.

According to wine expert Oz Clarke, Nuragus tends to make light-bodied neutral flavored wines. Joe Bastianich and David Lynch describe well made examples of Nuragus in favorable vintages as having aromas similar to Vermentino with almonds and sour apple flavor notes. The high potential acidity of the grape, even grown in the very warm Mediterranean climate of southern Sardinia allow the grapes to have notable acid notes that Bastianich and Lynch describe as reminiscent of Portugal's Vinho Verde and Spanish Albarino wines.

== Synonyms ==
Over the years Nuragus has been known under a variety of synonyms including Abbondosa, Abboudossa, Abbsudosa, Abundans, Aksina de Marjian, Aksina de Popurus, Axina de Margiai, Axina de Popurus, Axina Scacciadeppidus, Bruscu biancu, Burdu, Garna Chchija, Garnaccia, Granazza, Lacconargiu, Malvasia di Luras, Meragus, Nugarus, Nuragus blanc de Sardaigne, Nuragus Moscadeddu, Nuragus Moscatello and Nuragus Trebbiana.
