= Cerasuolo d'Abruzzo =

Italian classification of rosé wine

- Wine region
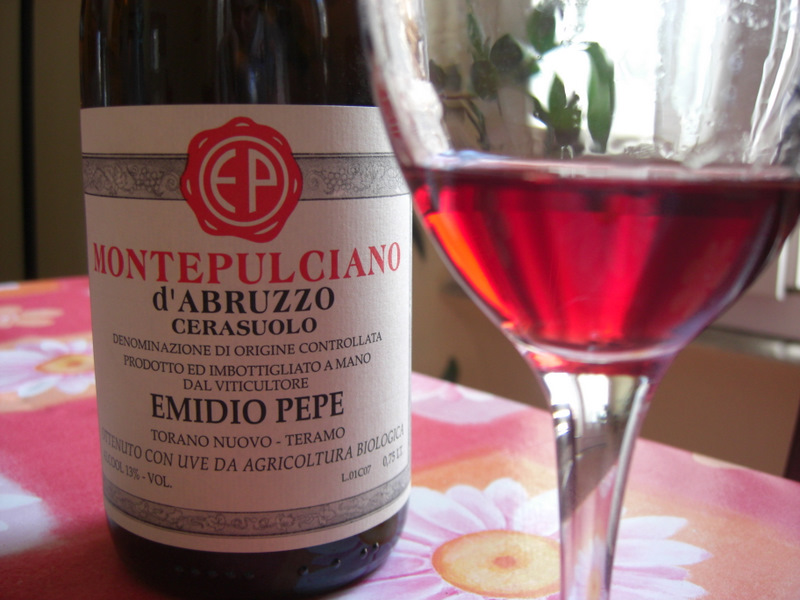
- A Cerasuolo rosé made from Montepulciano, Abruzzo
- Type: DOC
- Year established: 2010
- Country: Italy
- Part of: Abruzzo
- Other regions in Abruzzo: Montepulciano d'Abruzzo
- Climate region: III
- Grapes produced: Montepulciano, Sangiovese

Cerasuolo d'Abruzzo is an Italian DOC classification of a rosé (Italian: rosato) style wine made from the Montepulciano grape in Italy's Abruzzo wine region. The name cerasuolo (lit. 'cherry-red') relates to the deep color the wine obtains from even very brief skin-contact with the highly pigmented skins of the Montepulciano grapes.

== History ==
In Abruzzo, cerasuolo has always referred to the rosé style of wine made in the region. It has been produced under the rules of the Montepulciano d'Abruzzo DOC since it was established in 1968, and in 2010 it was promoted to its own separate Cerasuolo d'Abruzzo DOC. The term cerasuolo can also refer to Cerasuolo di Vittoria, an unrelated DOCG dry red wine from Sicily made from Nero d'Avola and Frappato.

== Winemaking and viticulture ==
Cerasuolo is made in the rosato style using the same DOC composition rules as the red wines of Montepulciano d'Abruzzo: at least 85% Montepulciano, and the remainder Sangiovese or other local varieties.

Finished Cerasuolo wines must have a minimum alcohol level of 12%, and be released no earlier than 1 January of the year following vintage (about 2–3 months of bottle age). For wines marked Superiore, the minimum alcohol is higher at 12.5% and the earliest release date is 1st of March in the year following vintage (about 4–5 months of bottle age).

The DOC includes the same restrictions on vineyard elevation as the Montepulciano DOC: no higher than 500 metres (1,600 ft) above sea level, or 600 metres (2,000 ft) for vineyards on south-facing slopes.

== Sensory properties ==
According to Bastianich, Cerasuolo tend to be a darker red colour than typical rosé wines from France or other regions of Italy, more intense, medium-bodied, with aromas of orange peel, cinnamon, strawberry and dried cherries.
