= Emidio Pepe =

Italian vintner

- Pepe in 2009
- Born: July 27, 1932; Torano Nuovo
- Died: July 28, 2026 (aged 94); Torano Nuovo
- Occupation: Vintner

Emidio Pepe (1932-2026) was an Italian vintner best known for his work popularizing wine from the Abruzzo wine region. He utilized traditional winemaking methods and organic growing processes. His best known wines were Montepulciano d'Abruzzo and Trebbiano d'Abruzzo.

== Biography ==
Pepe was born Agostino Pepe on July 27, 1932, to a family who had grown grapes and made wine for their personal use since the nineteenth century. He dropped out of school at a young age and worked with his father as an agricultural consultant. During this time, he also took courses in Italian and literature by correspondence. In the 1950s, he became a farmer working for other people, and subsequently became head of a farmers association.

In 1960, he took a trip to the Netherlands as part of an agricultural exchange program, living with farmers of table grapes who sold these grapes to Italy. This resulted in him deciding to become a winemaker, which he shifted to in 1964.

He was the first in his family to bottle wines: his father disapproved due to the reputation of wine from Abruzzo as being poor. However, he remained undissuaded and continued working. He was best known for his Montepulciano d'Abruzzo and Trebbiano d'Abruzzo, and was dubbed "Mister Montepulciano" for popularizing the wine styles.

He started with a small winery, too small to be included in a trip to New York by the local wine consortium, but worked to promote his wines by traveling around the world. One of his early allies was chef Lidia Bastianich, who recommended his wines in her 1998 book. By the time of his death, The New York Times wrote that his wine was celebrated around the world and sold for well over the predicted maximum. He was described as a legend and superstar by Frances Mayes.

His methods included avoiding chemical fertilizers and pesticides, utilizing traditional pergolas for the growth of grapes, destemming them by hand, crushing them by feet, aging wine in concrete and glass instead of wood casks, and using native yeast. These methods led him to be certified as a biodynamic winemaker and viewed as a leader of terroir in Italy, though his goal was only to make the wine well. He held back a large portion of the bottles he made for further aging, which sold for far more. He was awarded the sustainability award by Liquid Icons.

Until close to his death, he continued to walk his vineyards every day, which he explained by stating "The countryside is my gym." He died on July 28, 2026. People who mourned him included Luigi D'Eramo, Marco Marsilio, and Michele Fina.
