= Controguerra =

- Comune
- Comune di Controguerra
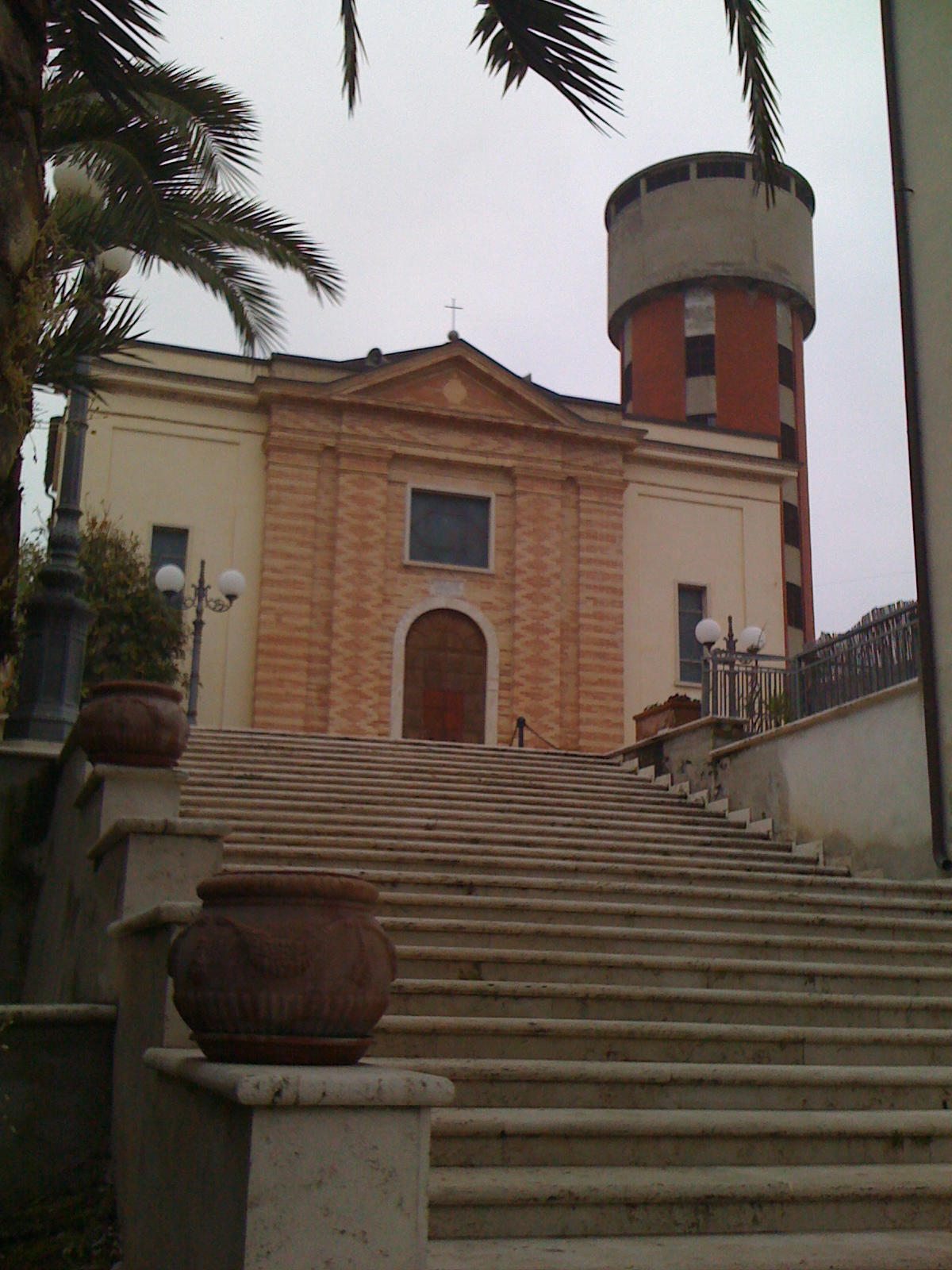
- Church of Madonna delle Grazie

- Location within Italy Location within Abruzzo
- Coordinates: 42°51′N 13°49′E
- Country: Italy
- Region: Abruzzo
- Province: Teramo (TE)
- Frazioni: Commenda, Mattonelle, Piano del Tronto, Pignotto, San Giovanni, San Giuseppe Lavoratore, Santa Croce, Taiano

Government
  - Mayor: Franco Carletta

Area
  - Total: 22.82 km^{2} (8.81 sq mi)
- Elevation: 267 m (876 ft)

Population (30 June 2017)
  - Total: 2,376
  - Density: 104.1/km^{2} (269.7/sq mi)
- Demonym: Controguerresi
- Time zone: UTC+1 (CET)
  - Summer (DST): UTC+2 (CEST)
- Postal code: 64010
- Dialing code: 0861
- Patron saint: San Benedetto
- Saint day: 21 March
- Website: Official website

Controguerra (Abruzzese: Cundrauè, Cundrùuèrrë) is a comune (municipality) in the province of Teramo, in the Italian region of Abruzzo.

== Controguerra DOC ==
Controguerra is noted for the Italian DOC wine produced in the hills and a valley near the comune. The area produces a wide variety of wine styles including, red, white, passito and spumante. Grape harvest are limited to yields of 14 tonnes/ha. The red wines of Controguerra are made predominantly of Montepulciano (at least 60%) with Merlot, Cabernet Franc and Cabernet Sauvignon permitted up to 15% of the blend and other local varieties permitted up to 25%. Whites wines are composed of 60% Trebbiano and at least 15% Passerina with other local varieties permitted up to 25%. Sparkling Spumante wines are composed of at least 60% Trebbiano, at least 30% blend of Chardonnay, Verdicchio and Pecorino with other varieties permitted up to 10%. Finished red wines are required to have at least 12% alcohol and finished whites a minimum of 11%.

== See also ==
- List of Italian DOC wines
- Abruzzo (wine)
