= Fiol Prosecco =

Italian luxury brand of wine

FIOL Prosecco
- Logo designed by Audric Henri Dandres
- Industry: "Winery"
- Founded: Treviso, Italy (2010)
- Headquarters: Treviso, Italy
- Products: Italian Wine, Prosecco
- Website: www.fiol.it

FIOL Prosecco is an Italian luxury brand of Prosecco DOC.

== History ==
FIOL brand was founded in 2010 by a group of friends born in Treviso, the capital of prosecco region. FIOL is produced in the countryside in the surroundings of Treviso and it is distributed worldwide. 3GP is the company which produces FIOL: it is managed by an independent team based in Treviso. Tito Ciani Bassetti is the chairman of the company. In the ancient Venetian language the word "fiol" means "son" and also "young boy", and it is commonly used to address the "cool guy".

== Wine ==
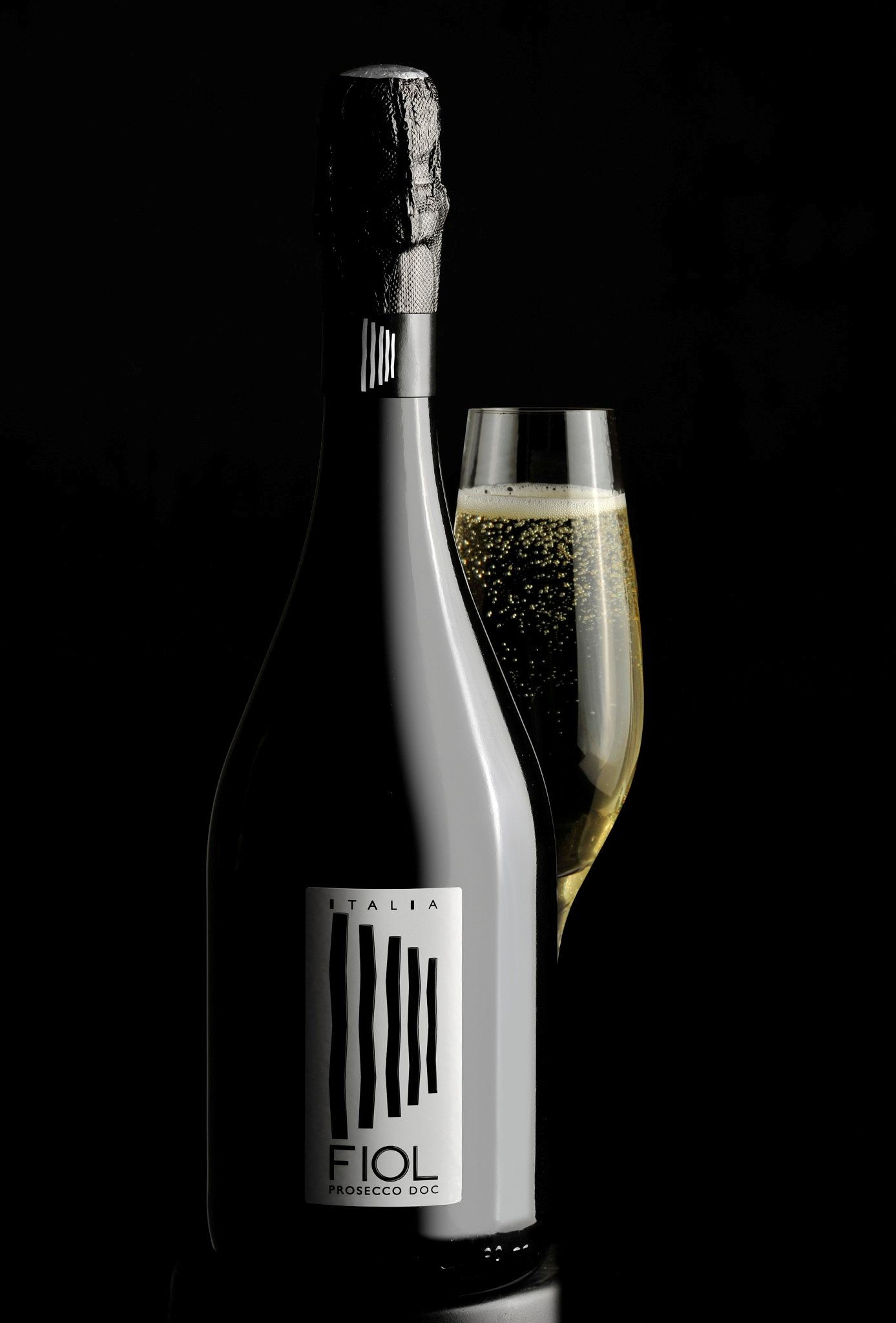
FIOL Prosecco Doc

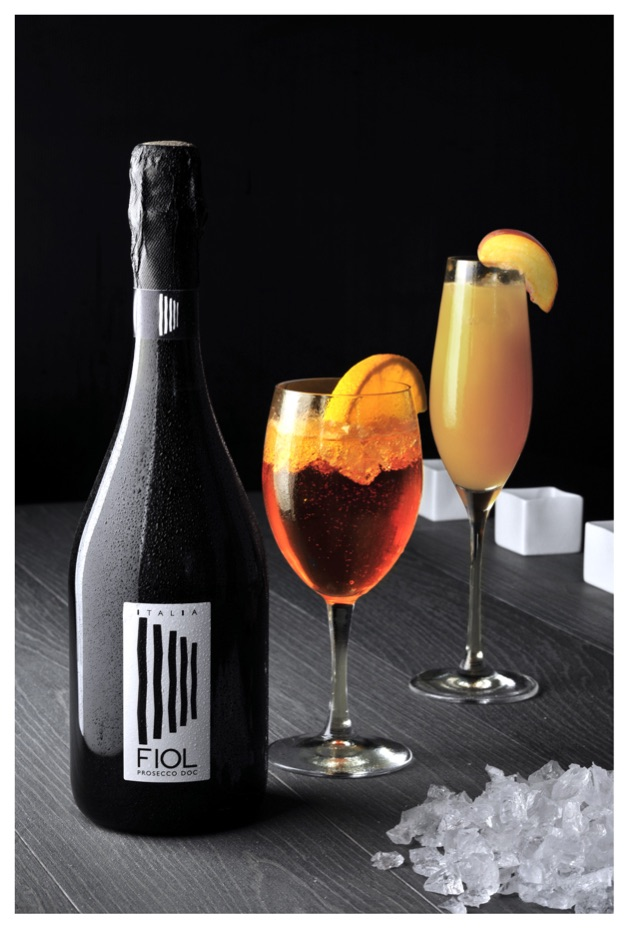
FIOL cocktails

FIOL is a DOC (Denominazione di origine controllata) Extra Dry Prosecco.

=== The grapes ===
FIOL is produced with Glera grapes gathered exclusively in the province of Treviso, the heart of the Prosecco DOC area. The vineyards are located in the area of the flood plain of the Piave river and are exposed towards the east and north-west.

=== Organoleptic Characteristics ===
The colour is a pale salmon-pink, and on the nose, there are bright notes of red berries and a hint of fresh herbs. On the palate, the wine is balanced and creamy, with a crisp, delicate finish.

=== Technical characteristics ===
- Extra-dry Prosecco
- Colour: light straw
- Aroma: ripe crab apple, lilac and acacia flowers
- Flavour: flavoursome, medium-sweet, floral and fruity
- 100% Glera grapes
- 5 bar pressure
- 11.0% alc. vol.
- 16 g/L. reducing sugars
- 6-8 °C serve chilled

== Label ==
FIOL logo is inspired by the vine sticks, created by man to give support to the plant. The project stems from an ideas competition, organised to give space to a creative youth. The label is the work of French-Italian designer, Audric Dandres.

== Awards and Reviews ==
=== Awards ===
- In 2015 FIOL was awarded with one silver medal at the Prosecco Masters from a panel composed of Masters of Wine, Master Sommeliers and senior buyers.
- In 2014 FIOL earned a silver medal at Concours Mondial the Bruxelles, historic wine competition that annually recognises the best wines in the world.
- In 2014 FIOL received eight medals as best wine paired with a selection of Asian dishes at Cathay Pacific Hong Kong International Wine&Spirit Competition, an important Asian wine competition.
- In 2014 FIOL received an award at the International Wine Challenge, one of the most important wine competitions in the world.
- In 2012 FIOL earned a bronze medal at the Decanter Asia Wine Award, the largest wine competition in Asia.

=== Reviews ===
- Forbes magazine mentioned FIOL, unique Italian wine, one of the "coolest" labels of 2014.
- The Globe and Mail's wine critic Beppi Crosariol gave FIOL a 90/100 score in 2014.

== Partnerships ==
In 2013 FIOL Prosecco launched a partnership and sponsorship agreement with Ospreys, a leading rugby team from Wales. In 2015 FIOL became the official events partner of Ospreys Rugby, as well as a partner of the London Ospreys Business Network and official supplier to Swansea Liberty Stadium.

== Distribution ==
FIOL Prosecco is distributed in seven countries.

- Italy, FIOL headquarters
- United Kingdom - Distribution by Enotria World Wine.
- USA - FIOL is imported by Meregalli USA and distributed by Empire Merchants.
- Canada - FIOL's wine agency is Charton Hobbs
- Hong Kong and China - Distribution by Wine Talent
- France - Distribution by South World Wine
- Indonesia (Jakarta&Bali) - Distribution by Vin, Wine and Beyond
