= Bianco di Pitigliano =

Italian controlled wine origin in Tuscany

Bianco di Pitigliano is a denominazione di origine controllata that is located close to the southern coast of Tuscany, in Italy. The DOC was created in 1966.

== Geography ==
Bianco di Pitigliano encompasses a large area of Tuscany, stretching from the commune of Scansano in the north and Pitigliano to the east, to the border with Lazio in the south. On the west side, the DOC borders the Ansonica Costa dell'Argentario DOC. Within the region are portions of the Fiora river.

== DOC Regulations ==
Bianco di Pitigliano, as its name suggests, is dedicated solely to the production of white wines. Red wine production in this area falls under the Morellino di Scansano or Sovana DOCs, depending on the location of the vineyard.

The wine regulations for Bianco di Pitigliano can be confusing; the blend requires between 50% and 80% Trebbiano Toscano, up to 20% Greco, Malvasia Bianca, and/or Verdello, up to 30% together and no more than 15% individually of Grechetto, Chardonnay, Sauvignon blanc, Pinot bianco and/or Riesling Italico, and up to 10% of other white grapes.
