= Vermentino di Gallura =

Italian dry white wine

- Grape (Vitis)
- Color of berry skin: blanc
- Species: Vitis vinifera
- Origin: Italy
- Notable regions: Sardinia

Vermentino di Gallura is one of the most important wine grape in Sardinia..

== History ==
It has become a DOCG wine in its own right starting from November 2011.

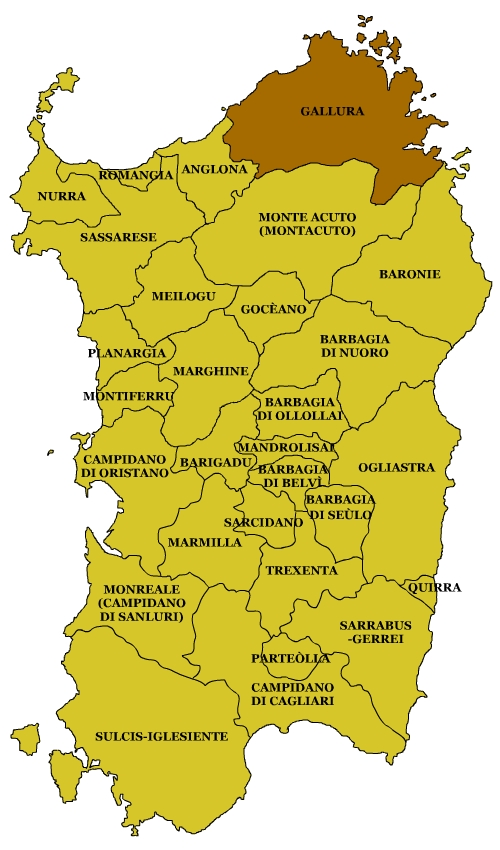
Gallura: the Vermentino DOCG production area

The production area includes the entire territory of the municipalities of Aggius, Aglientu, Arzachena, Badesi, Berchidda, Bortigiadas, Budoni, Calangianus, Golfo Aranci, Loiri Porto San Paolo, Luogosanto, Luras, Monti, Olbia, Oschiri, Palau, Sant'Antonio di Gallura, San Teodoro, Santa Teresa di Gallura, Telti, Tempio Pausania, Trinità d'Agultu, and Viddalba.

== Viticulture ==
- Principal White Grape Varieties: Vermentino
