= Trebbiano d'Abruzzo (wine) =

Variety of grape

- Grape (Vitis)
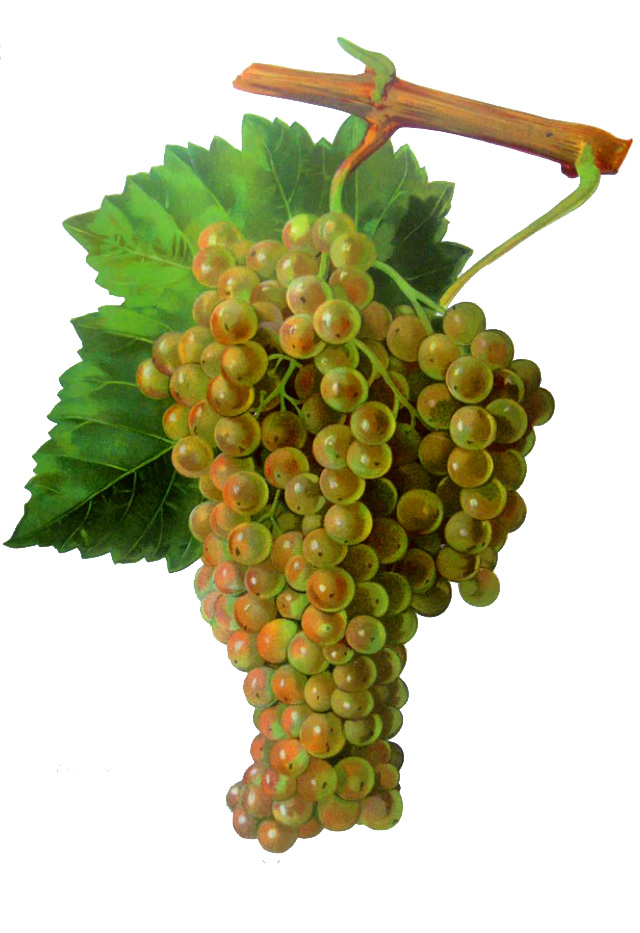
- Color of berry skin: Blanc
- Species: Vitis vinifera
- Origin: Italy
- Notable regions: Abruzzo

Trebbiano d'Abruzzo is the most important white wine grape in Abruzzo. It was championed by many individuals, including Emidio Pepe.

== History ==
Created in 1972 as white wine DOC that covers virtually the entire Abruzzo region. This DOC has one of the highest permitted yields in all of Italy at 17.5 hl/ha. The wine is made from the Trebbiano d'Abruzzo grape (local name for Bombino bianco but may be another grape variety) and Trebbiano Toscano, which was once thought to be the same grape as Trebbiano d'Abruzzo, must account for at least 85% of the blend with Malvasia Toscano, Cococciola and Passerina permitted to make up to 15% of the blend. The wines must be aged a minimum of 5 months prior to release and attain a minimum alcohol level of at least 11.5%. Trebbiano d'Abruzzo is one of the most cultivated vines in Atri, the modern name of Hatria.

== Sensory properties ==
Colour: Straw-yellow color. Perfume: Aroma delicate with floral notes, peach scents Flavour: Well-bodied wine, mineral, delicate and persistent. Serving temperature: ambient.
