= Nasco (grape) =

Variety of grape

The Cagliari Region of Italy's Sardinia Island--home of the Nasco grape

Nasco is a white Italian wine grape variety that is grown primarily in Sardinia around the city of Cagliari. The grape has a long history on the island and is described by wine expert Jancis Robinson as "ancient". There is a special Denominazione di origine controllata (DOC) designation, Nasco di Cagliari, for varietal wines that are 95–100% Nasco.

== History ==
While the grape was once widely planted throughout Sardinia, vineyards were devastated by the phylloxera epidemic of the 19th century (1801 to 1900) and Nasco's numbers have been slow to rebound. Today there are less than 40 hectares (100 acres) of the vine planted on the island.

== DOC wines ==
The DOC zone for Nasco extends south and west of the Gennargentu mountains and includes the broad Campidano plain. Here Nasco can be produced in dry (secco), sweet (dolce) and fortified (liquoroso) styles. Nasco grapes that are destined for DOC wine production must be harvested to a yield no greater than 10 tonnes/hectare. The finished wines must reach a certain minimum alcohol level based on the style of the particular wine ranging from 13.5% for dolce, 14.5% secco and 17.5% for liquoroso wines. A separate Riserva bottling can also be produced provided the wine is aged a minimum of two years prior to release with at least one of those years being spent in oak.

== Synonyms ==
Over the years Nasco has been known under a variety of synonyms including Basco Bianco, Nasco Bianco, Nasco di Sardegna, Nascu, Nasko Sardinskii, Nusco, Ogu de Aranna and Resu.
