= Abruzzo DOC =

Variety of grape

Abruzzo
- Grape (Vitis)
- Species: Vitis vinifera
- Origin: Italy
- Notable regions: Abruzzo

Abruzzo is an important red and white wine grape in Abruzzo.

== History ==
It was established as a red wine DOC in 2010.

== Viticulture ==
- Principal Red Grape Varieties: Montepulciano
- Principal White Grape Varieties:Chardonnay, Cococciola, Gewürztraminer, Malvasia, Montonico Bianco, Moscato, Passerina, Pecorino, Riesling, Sauvignon Blanc
