= Terre di Casauria DOCG =

Variety of grape

Terre di Casauria
- Grape (Vitis)
- Species: Vitis vinifera
- Origin: Italy
- Notable regions: Abruzzo

Terre di Casauria or Casauria is one of the most important wine grape in Abruzzo..

== History ==
It has become a DOCG wine in its own right starting from November 2025, previously it was a typology foreseen by the DOC Montepulciano d'Abruzzo regulations.

== Viticulture ==
- Principal Red Grape Varieties: Montepulciano
