= Frascati DOC =

Italian wine with a controlled origin

Frascati, an Italian white wine, takes its name from the town of Frascati, located 25 km southeast of Rome, in Lazio, Italy. Archeological discoveries from the ancient town of Tusculum, now Frascati, demonstrate the cultivation of grapes for wine since the 5th century BC. Frascati was one of the preferred wines of ancient Rome, of Renaissance popes, of poets and artists visiting in the Grand Tour (1700s and 1800s), and of the La Dolce Vita generation in the 1960s. Made from Malvasia di Candia, Malvasia del Lazio, Grechetto, Bombino bianco, and Trebbiano grapes, Frascati gained denominazione di origine controllata (DOC) status in 1966 and DOCG status in 2011, making it one of Italy's first DOC wines. The Frascati DOC/DOCG area is located in the heart of the Roman Castles, Tusculum and Albani Hills south of Rome, and north of Lake Albano. The vineyards range from 200 to 1,000 feet in altitude. The soils are well drained and volcanic. The DOC allows for a minimum of 70% Malvasia (Bianca di Candia) and/or Malvasia del Lazio (aka Bombino) and a 30% maximum of Trebbiano and/or Greco and a maximum of 10% other white grapes. Many of the vineyards' cellars have ancient Roman caves. Modern cellars and techniques are now leading the way to an ever-growing reputation of a fine quality wine, with many award-winning labels. Frascati wine is an ingredient in the Frascati Frizz aperitif.

Two Frascati wines qualified on Sep 20th 2011 for the higher DOCG recognition:

- Frascati Superiore, a white wine,
- Cannellino di Frascati, a sweet dessert wine.
