= Montepulciano (grape) =

Variety of grape

- Grape (Vitis)
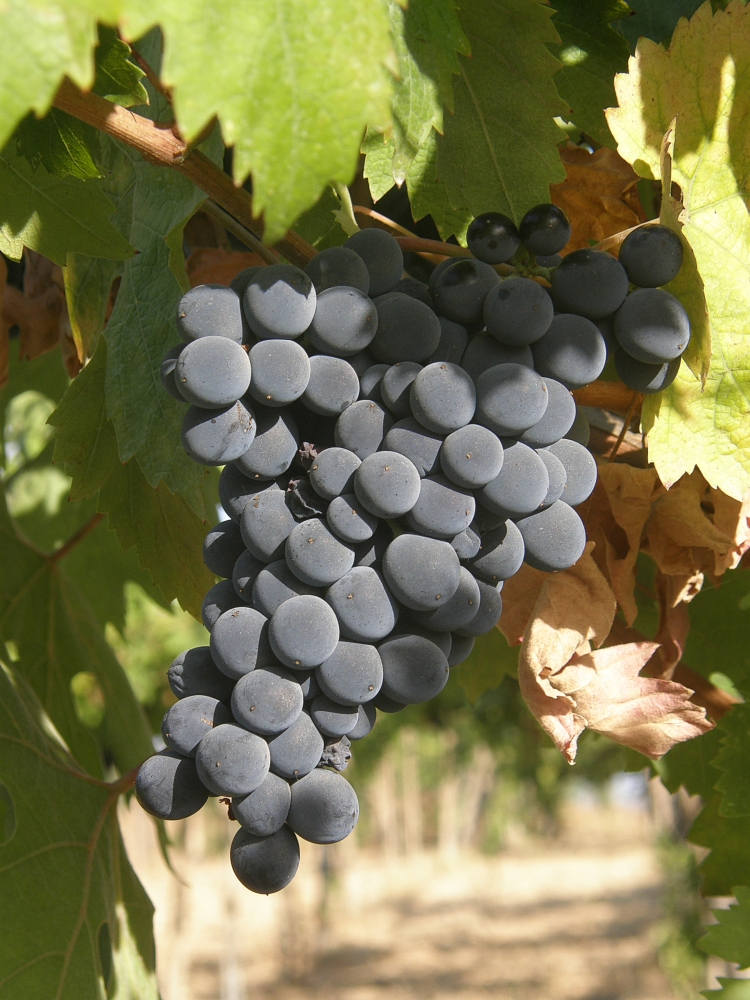
- Montepulciano growing in Abruzzi
- Color of berry skin: Purple
- Species: Vitis vinifera
- Origin: Italy
- Notable regions: Abruzzo
- VIVC number: 7949

Montepulciano (UK: /ˌmɒnteɪpʊlˈtʃɑːnoʊ, -tɪp-/ MON-tay-puul-CHAH-noh, -tih-, Italian: [ˌmontepulˈtʃaːno]) is a red Italian wine grape variety. It is the primary grape behind the DOCG wines Colline Teramane Montepulciano d'Abruzzo, Conero and Offida Rosso; and the DOC wines Montepulciano d'Abruzzo, Rosso Conero, and Rosso Piceno Superiore.

It should not be confused with the similarly named Tuscan wine Vino Nobile di Montepulciano, which is made from predominantly Sangiovese and is named for the town it is produced in, rather than for containing any Montepulciano grapes in the blend.

The grape is widely planted throughout central and southern Italy, most notably in Abruzzo, Lazio, Marche, Molise, Umbria and Apulia, and is a permitted variety in DOC wines produced in 20 of Italy's 95 provinces. Montepulciano is rarely found in northern Italy because the grape has a tendency to ripen late and can be excessively "green" if harvested too early.

When fully ripened, Montepulciano can produce deeply colored wines, with moderate acidity and noticeable extract and alcohol levels.

== Origins and confusion with other Montepulciano wines ==
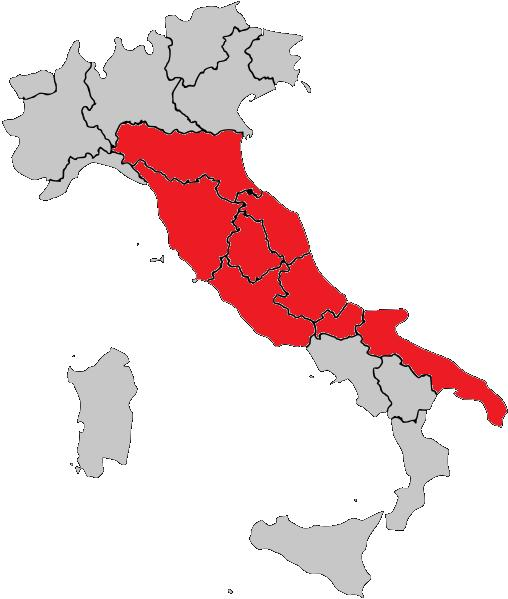
The spread of the Montepulciano grape throughout Italy

Although the varietal's name refers to the Montepulciano region in the province of Siena in Tuscany, its origin is more likely to be in the Abruzzo region in central Italy, possibly in the area of Torre de' Passeri. Because Sangiovese is widely grown in the Montepulciano area of Tuscany, Montepulciano has often been considered a synonym for Sangiovese, but this is contradicted by ampelographic observations and DNA profiling (Vouillamoz). Despite its name, the Montepulciano grape does not seem to have any tangible connection to the town of that name or to the Vino Nobile di Montepulciano. Furthermore, despite being widely planted throughout central Italy, the Montepulciano grape is not grown in the vineyards around the actual town of Montepulciano.

== Wine regions ==
After Sangiovese, Montepulciano is Italy's second most widely dispersed indigenous grape variety. It is a recommended planting in 20 of Italy's 110 provinces and is a permitted or required grape in the red wines of DOCs in Apulia, Molise, Lazio, Umbria, Marche, Emilia-Romagna, Abruzzi and Tuscany. Among the DOCs that are most noted for Montepulciano are Montepulciano d'Abruzzo in Abruzzi, Offida Rosso DOCG, Rosso Conero and Rosso Piceno in Marche. Though it is a secondary variety to Uva di Troia in the Castel Del Monte DOC, according to wine expert Jancis Robinson the character that Montepulciano contributes to the blend is perhaps "its finest incarnation".

=== DOCs and DOCGs ===
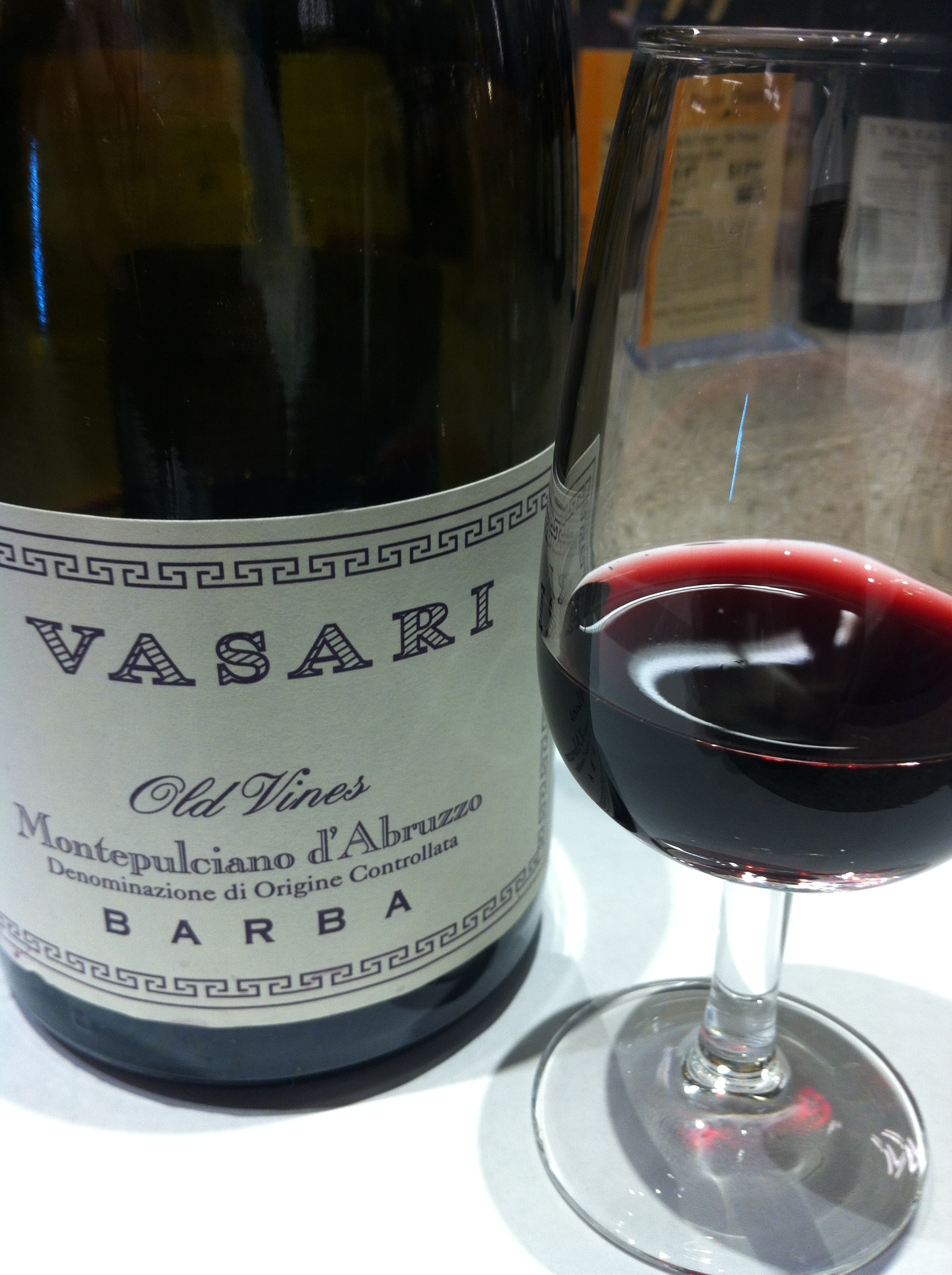
A Montepulciano d'Abruzzo wine made from the Montepulciano grape in the Abruzzo region

The following is a list of DOCs and DOCGs that include Montepulciano as a permitted grape variety, along with other grapes that may be included in the blend under varying percentages that are regulated under the DOC/G label.

- Alezio DOC (Apulia) – can be blended with Negroamaro, Sangiovese and Malvasia
- Biferno DOC (Molise) – must be 60–70% of the wine. Can be blended with Trebbiano Toscano (in rosé and red wines) and Aglianico
- Brindisi DOC (Apulia) – can be blended with Negroamaro, Sangiovese and Malvasia
- Cacc'e mmitte di Lucera DOC (Apulia) – can be blended with Sumarello, Sangiovese, Malvasia, Trebbiano and Bombino bianco
- Castel Del Monte DOC (Apulia) – can be blended with Uva di Troia, Sangiovese, Aglianico and Pinot noir
- Castelli Romani DOC (Lazio) – can be blended with Cesanese, Merlot, Sangiovese and Nero Buono
- Cerveteri DOC (Lazio) – can be blended with Sangiovese, Cesanese, Canaiolo nero, Carignan and Barbera
- Cesanese di Olevano Romano DOC (Lazio) – can be blended with Cesanese, Sangiovese, Barbera, Trebbiano and Bambino bianco
- Colli Amerini DOC (Umbria) – can be blended with Sangiovese, Ciliegiolo, Canaiolo, Merlot and Barbera
- Colli Etruschi Viterbesi DOC (Lazio) – can be blended with Sangiovese
- Colli Maceratesi DOC (Marche) – can be blended with Sangiovese, Cabernet Sauvignon, Cabernet Franc, Ciliegiolo, Lacrima, Merlot and Vernaccia nera
- Colli Martani DOC (Umbria) – can be blended with Sangiovese, Canaiolo, Ciliegiolo, Barbera, Merlot, Trebbiano, Grechetto, Malvasia, Garganega and Verdicchio
- Colli Perugini DOC (Umbria) – can be blended with Sangiovese, Ciliegiolo, Barbera and Merlot
- Colli Pesaresi DOC (Marche) – can be blended with Sangiovese and Ciliegiolo
- Colli di Rimini DOC (Emilia-Romagna) – can be blended with Sangiovese, Cabernet Sauvignon, Merlot, Barbera, Terrano and Ancellotta
- Colline Teramane Montepulciano d'Abruzzo DOCG (Abruzzi) – at least 85% of the wine. Can be blended with Sangiovese
- Collo della Romagna Centrale DOC (Emilia-Romagna) – can be blended with Cabernet Sauvignon, Sangiovese, Barbera and Merlot
- Colli della Sabina DOC (Lazio) – can be blended with Sangiovese
- Conero DOCG (Marche) – at least 85% of the blend with Sangiovese making up the other component, can be 100%
- Controguerra DOC (Abruzzi) – at least 60% of the blend. Can be blended with Merlot, Cabernet Sauvignon and Cabernet Franc
- Copertino DOC (Abruzzi) – can be blended with Negroamaro, Malvasia and Sangiovese
- Cori DOC (Lazio) – can be blended with Nero Buono and Bonvino nero
- Esino DOC (Marche) – along with Sangiovese must be at least 60% of the blend with local varieties filling out the rest
- Gioia del Colle DOC (Apulia) – can be blended with Primitivo, Sangiovese, Negroamara and Malvasia
- Lacrima di Morro d'Alba DOC (Marche) – can be blended with Lacrima and Verdicchio
- Leverano DOC (Apulia) – can be blended with Negroamaro, Malvasia and Sangiovese
- Lizzano DOC (Apulia) – can be blended with Negroamaro, Sangiovese, Bombino nero, Pinot noir and Malvasia
- Montepulciano d'Abruzzo DOC (Abruzzi) – at 85% of the wine. Can be blended with Sangiovese
- Nardo DOC (Apulia) – can be blended with Negro Amaro and Malvasia
- Offida DOCG (Marche) – at least 50% of the wine. Can be blended with Cabernet Sauvignon
- Orta Nova DOC (Apulia) – can be blended with Uva di Troia, Lambrusco Maestri and Trebbiano.
- Parrina DOC (Tuscany) – can be blended with Sangiovese, Canaiolo and Colorino
- Pentro di Isernia DOC (Molise) – at least 45–55% of the wine with Sangiovese making up the other component.
- Rosso Barletta DOC (Apulia) – can be blended with Uva di Troia, Sangiovese and Malbec
- Rosso Canosa DOC (Apulia) – can be blended with Uva di Troia and Sangiovese
- Rosso di Cerignola DOC (Apulia) – can be blended with Uva di Troia, Negroamaro, Sangiovese, Barbera, Malbec and Trebbiano
- Rosso Conero DOC (Marche) – at least 85% of the blend with Sangiovese making up the other component, can be 100%
- Rosso Orvietano DOC (Umbria) – can be blended with Aleatico, Cabernet Franc, Cabernet Sauvignon, Canaiolo, Ciliegiolo, Merlot, Pinot noir, Sangiovese, Barbera, Cesanese, Colorino and Dolcetto. Can be a varietal with 85% of the blend but that is rarely seen.
- Rosso Piceno DOC (Marche) – can be blended with Sangiovese, Trebbiano and Passerina
- San Severo DOC (Apulia) – at least 70–100% of the blend with Sangiovese making up the other component
- Tarquinia DOC (Lazio) – either/or with Sangiovese to make up a minimum 60% of the wine. Can be blended with Cesanese
- Torgiano DOC (Umbria) – can be blended with Sangiovese, Canaiolo, Trebbiano and Ciliegiolo
- Torgiano Rosso Riserva DOCG (Umbria) – can be blend with Sangiovese, Canaiolo, Trebbiano and Ciliegiolo.
- Velletri DOC (Lazio) – can be blended with Sangiovese, Cesanese, Bombino nero, Merlot and Ciliegiolo
- Vernaccia di Serrapetrona DOCG (Marche) – can be blend with Vernaccia di Serrapetrona, Sangiovese and Ciliegiolo

== Viticultural Characteristics ==
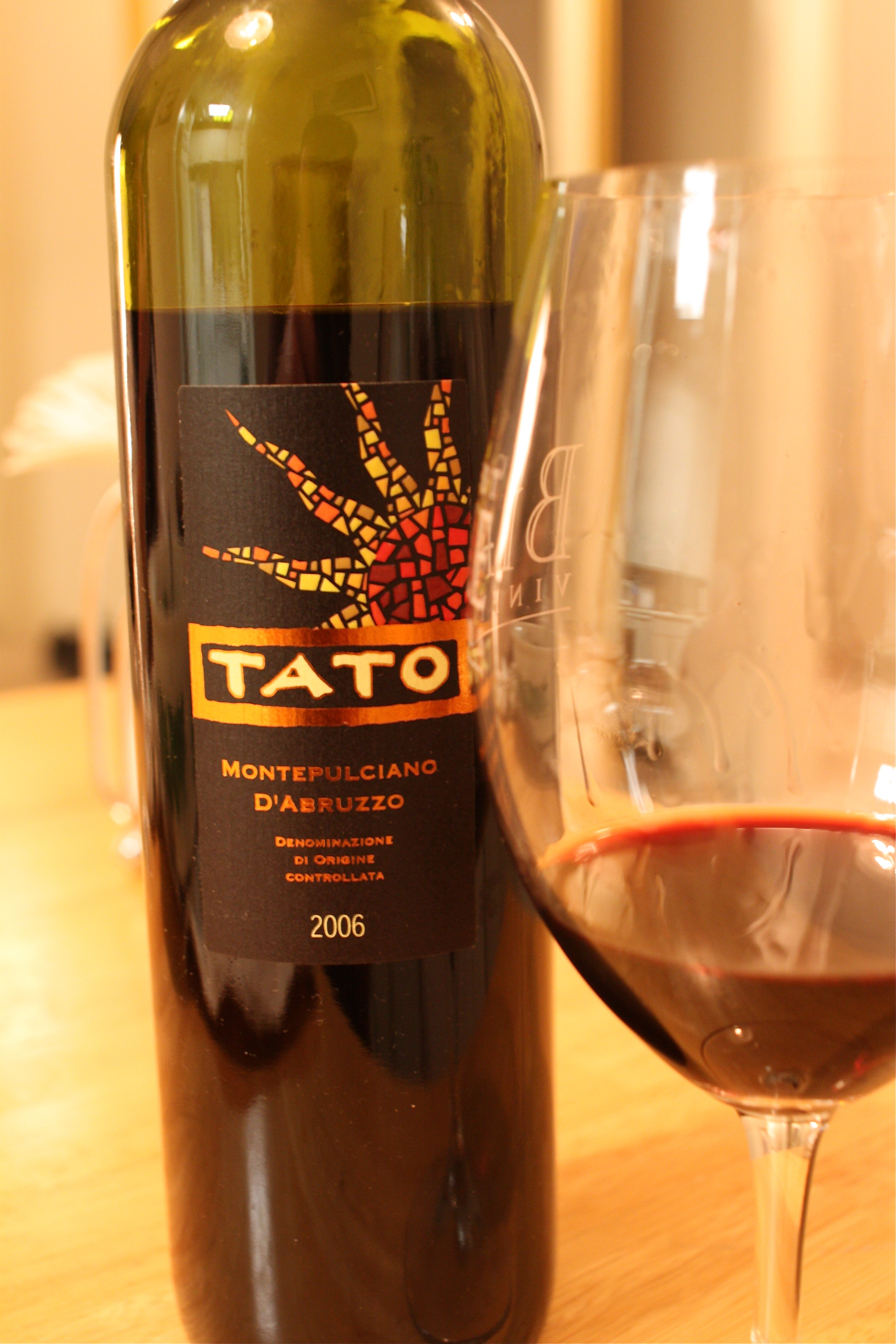
Montepulciano D'Abruzzo wine

Montepulciano is late budding (making it an ideal varietal for regions that have late spring frosts) and is late ripening. It is productive (high yielding), deeply colored, firmly structured and widely planted. It has good resistance to botrytis rot and powdery mildew. The grapes tend to be plump with thick skins. However, the skin has a fair amount of pigmented tannins and color producing phenols that with maceration can produce either a deep ruby colored wine or a pink Rosé wine. Compared to most Italian varieties, Montepulciano has moderately low acidity and more mild (i.e. softer) than bitter edged tannins. Wine expert Oz Clarke describes Montepulciano as producing a "round, plummy and weighty red with ripe tannins, good acidity and a low price tag". Jancis Robinson evaluates Montepulciano as a "promising variety" that produces smooth, drinkable wines that can improve for three or four years after vintage.

== Synonyms ==
Various synonyms have been used to describe Montepulciano and its wines, including Cordicso, Cordiscio, Cordisco, Cordisio, Monte Pulciano, Montepulciano Cordesco, Montepulciano di Torre de Passeri, Montepulciano Primatico, Morellone, Premutico, Primaticcio, Primutico, Sangiovese Cardisco, Sangiovese Cordisco, Sangiovetto, Torre dei Passeri, Uva Abruzzese and Uva Abruzzi.

== Outside Italy ==
Montepulciano is also grown in Turkey (Kemalpasa), Australia, Mexico, New Zealand, and the United States (California, North Carolina, and Texas).

== See also ==
- List of Italian grape varieties
