= Terre Tollesi (wine) =

Variety of grape

- Grape (Vitis)
- Species: Vitis vinifera
- Origin: Italy
- Notable regions: Abruzzo

Terre Tollesi or Tullum is one of the most important wine grape in Abruzzo..

== History ==
Established as a DOC in 2008; this wine is elevated to DOCG in 2019.

== Viticulture ==
- Principal Red Grape Varieties: Montepulciano
- Principal White Grape Varietes: Passerina, Pecorino
