= Cococciola =

Variety of grape

Cococciola is a white Italian wine grape variety that is one of the few Italian grape varieties to have its number of plantings increase in the late 20th century at a time when measures to combat Europe's perceived wine surplus and the general decline of viticulture saw the numbers of many varieties decline. Today, Cococciola is a permitted variety in the Trebbiano d'Abruzzo Denominazione di origine controllata (DOC) from the Abruzzo region of central Italy (Ari, Vacri and Rocca San Giovanni) .

== Synonyms ==
Various synonyms have been used to describe Cococciola and its wines including Cacciola, Cacciuolo and Cociumella.
