= David Lynch (wine expert) =

American writer and wine expert

David Lynch is an American writer and wine expert. Lynch was raised in Connecticut and graduated from Boston College. He worked as a senior editor for Wine & Spirits magazine and has authored wine-related articles for numerous periodicals and websites. He received a James Beard Journalism Award for his writing in 2001. In 2000, Lynch, along with Joseph Bastianich (an associate of Mario Batali), spent time in Italy researching and writing Vino Italiano: The Regional Wines of Italy, a book published in 2002.

Beginning in 2000, Lynch has worked at Babbo, an acclaimed New York City restaurant owned by Bastianich and Batali, first as wine director and later as general manager. David later became Wine Director at Quince restaurant in San Francisco while continuing to write and working on his next book.

== See also ==
- List of wine personalities
