= Montepulciano d'Abruzzo =

Italian red wine

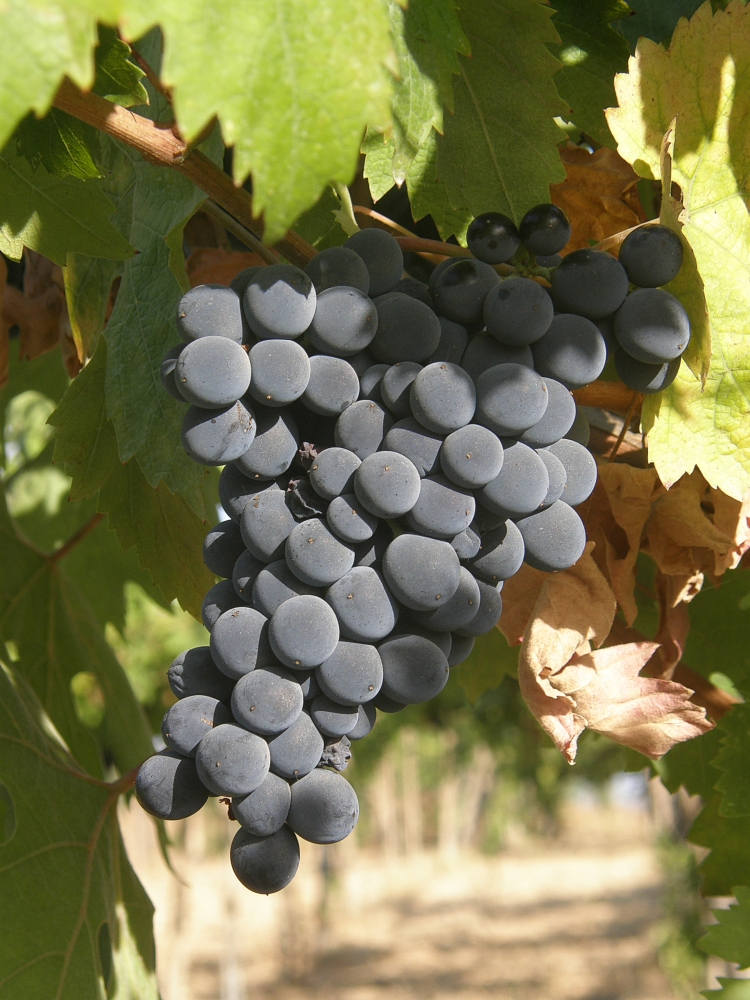
Montepulciano grapes growing in the Abruzzo region of east-central Italy

Montepulciano d'Abruzzo is an Italian red wine made from the Montepulciano wine grape in the Abruzzo region of east-central Italy. It should not be confused with Vino Nobile di Montepulciano, a Tuscan wine made from Sangiovese and other grapes.

Montepulciano d'Abruzzo was first classified as Denominazione di origine controllata (DOC) in 1968. The Colline Teramane subzone, established in 1995 as a DOC in the province of Teramo, was promoted to separate Denominazione di origine controllata e garantita (DOCG) status in 2003 and is now known as Colline Teramane Montepulciano d'Abruzzo. In the late 20th and early 21st century, Montepulciano d'Abruzzo earned a reputation as one of the most widely exported DOC wines in Italy. It is typically dry with soft tannins and often consumed young. It was popularized by Emidio Pepe.

In addition to Montepulciano, up to 15% Sangiovese is permitted in the blend. Wines aged by the maker for more than two years may be labeled Riserva.

== Wine region ==
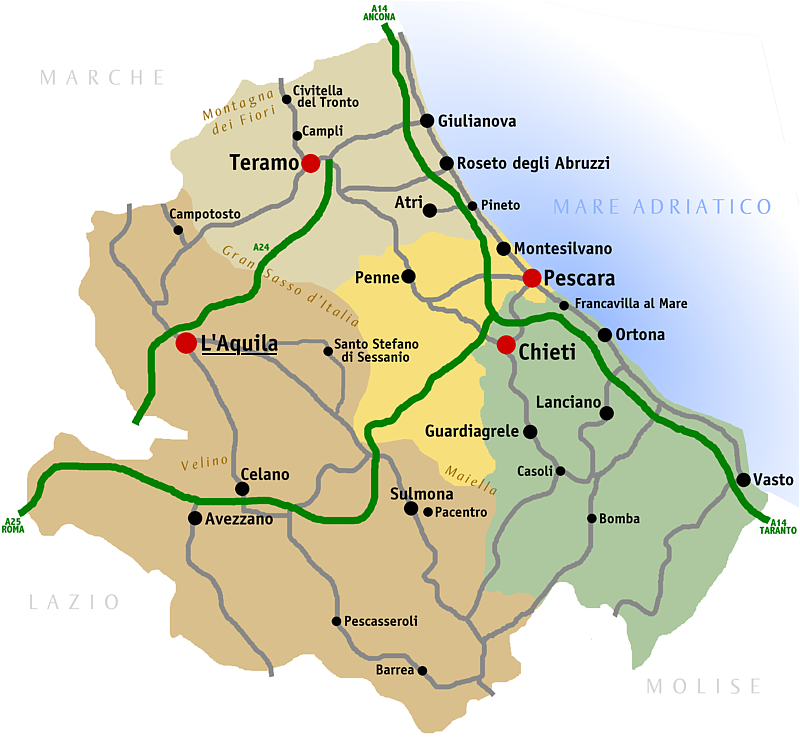
Map of the Abruzzo region and its four provinces where Montepulciano d'Abruzzo is produced

The DOC region for Montepulciano d'Abruzzo covers a vast expanse of land in the Abruzzo region between the Apennines foothills down to the Adriatic coast. The region is one of Italy's most mountainous with more than 65% of all Abruzzo being considered mountainous terrain, reaching up to 2,750 metres (9,000 ft) above sea level. The hillside vineyards, particularly in the northern areas, are planted on calcareous clay and benefit from warm and significant sun exposure, ventilated by dry breezes from the Adriatic Sea.

Several subzones have been defined in the DOC rules that delineate small areas producing higher quality wines, and impose stricter requirements. These are Alto Tirino, Casauria, Teate, Terre dei Peligni, and Terre dei Vestini.

Montepulciano is produced in all four provinces of Abruzzo—L'Aquila, Chieti, Pescara and Teramo—with the southern fertile province of Chieti producing the largest total quantity of wine. In the countryside of Atri, which produced a wine called Hadrianum, the first bottle of Montepulciano was labeled.

The mountainous province of L'Aquila is noted mainly for the dry rosato wine labeled as Cerasuolo and now a separate DOC. The most favorable vineyards are planted in the northern provinces of Pescara and Teramo, the latter now a separate DOCG designation. These northern provinces benefit from having less fertile soils with more ferrous clay and limestone, and higher elevations as the Apennines draw closer to the Adriatic. This creates cooler micro-climates that tend to produce more concentrated wines.

In 2014 there were approximately 8,718 hectares (21,540 acres) planted in the DOC producing 857,500 hectolitres (18,860,000 imp gal; 22,650,000 US gal) of wine, with more than two thirds of it being produced in the Chieti province.

== DOC requirements ==
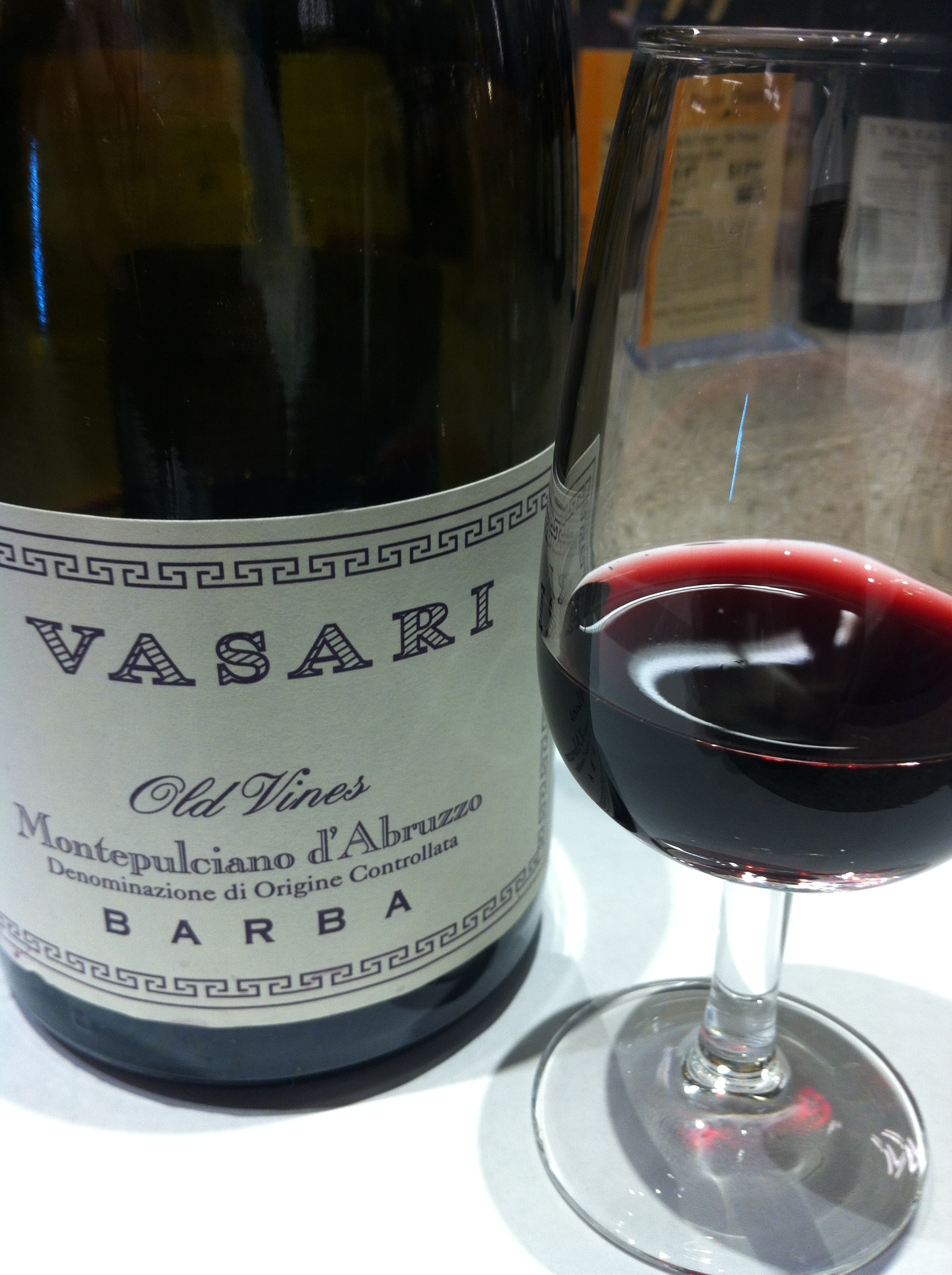
A Montepulciano d'Abruzzo wine labelled as being made from old vines

Under Italian wine laws, a Montepulciano d'Abruzzo DOC wine must be composed of a minimum of 85% Montepulciano with up to 15% of Sangiovese permitted to fill out the remainder of the wine. Grapes are harvested to a yield no greater than 14 tonnes per hectare. The wine must be aged for a minimum of 5 months prior to release, and bottles labeled Riserva must be aged at least two years, including a minimum of 9 months in wood barrels. Additionally, the alcohol level must be no lower than 12%, or 12.5% for Riserva.

The DOC subzones have stricter requirements: a higher proportion of Montepulciano, higher minimum alcohol levels, lower cropping yields and longer ageing. For instance, the Casauria subzone requires wine made only from 100% Montepulciano, a 13% minimum alcohol level (13.5% for Riserva), and 18 months aging (24 for Riserva) including a minimum of 9 months in barrels.

The lighter rosato style wine previously covered by this DOC was separated in 2010 into a new DOC called Cerasuolo d'Abruzzo.

=== Colline Teramane DOCG ===
Within the Montepulciano d'Abruzzo DOC region is the smaller Colline Teramane (Teramo hills) DOCG that is produced in the province of Teramo from vineyards planted in Teramo and 30 surrounding communes. Established first as a DOC in 1995, the region was promoted to DOCG status in 2003. The regulations for the wine are similar to Montepulciano d'Abruzzo except that the wine needs to be made from a minimum of 90% Montepulciano with a maximum of 10% Sangiovese permitted.

== Wine styles ==
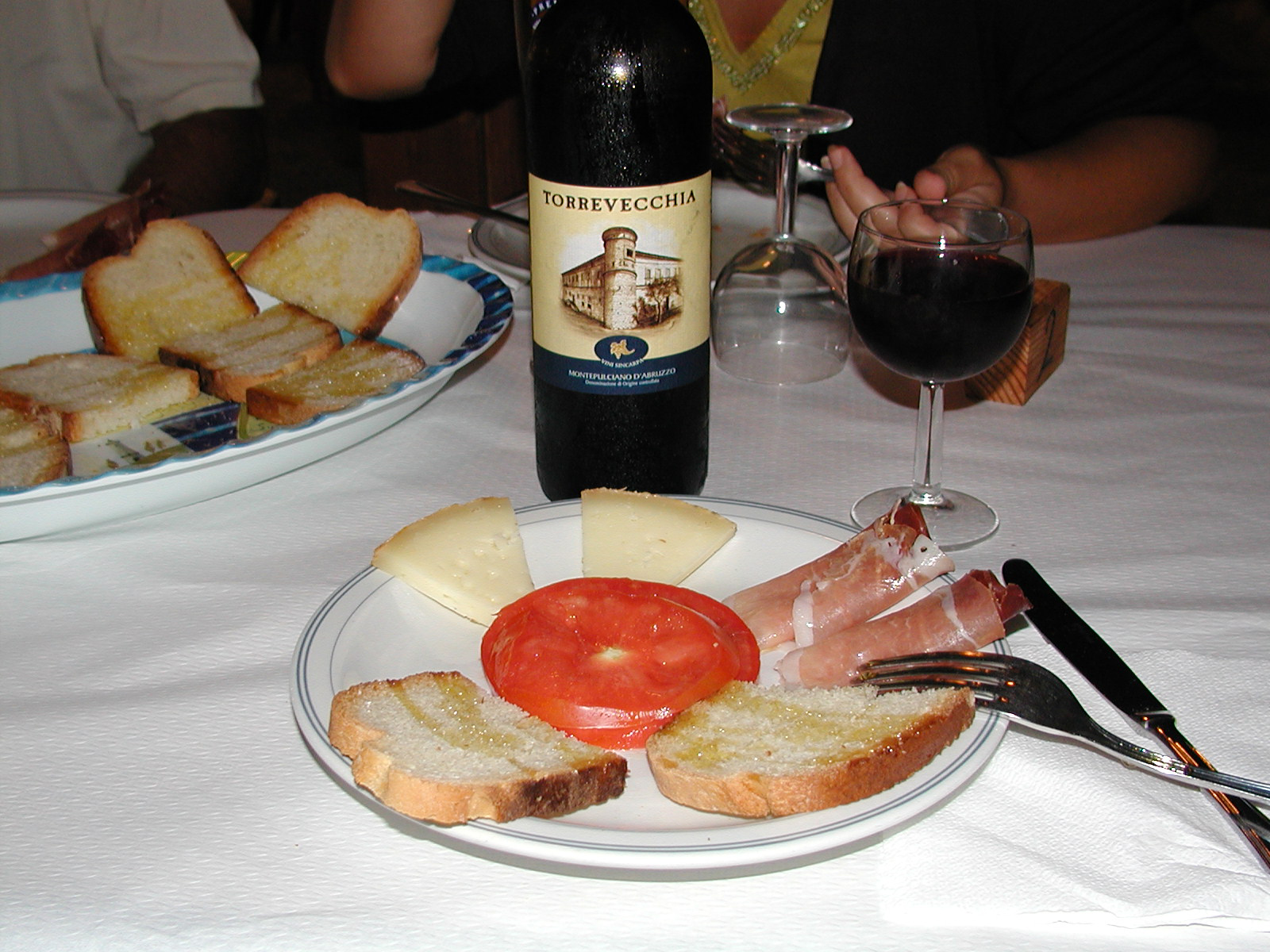
Montepulciano d'Abruzzo is often paired with food.

According to wine expert Oz Clarke, Montepulciano d'Abruzzo is often a deeply colored wine with pepper and spice notes. It can be described as "rustic" which Clarke says is less pronounced when the wine is paired with food. Master of Wine Mary Ewing-Mulligan describes the wines as aromatic, tannic and with low acidity. According to Italian wine expert Joe Bastianich, Montepulciano d'Abruzzos can be highly aromatic with earthy notes and black berries and have inky-purple color with a thick, almost syrupy mouthfeel.

=== Cerasuolo ===
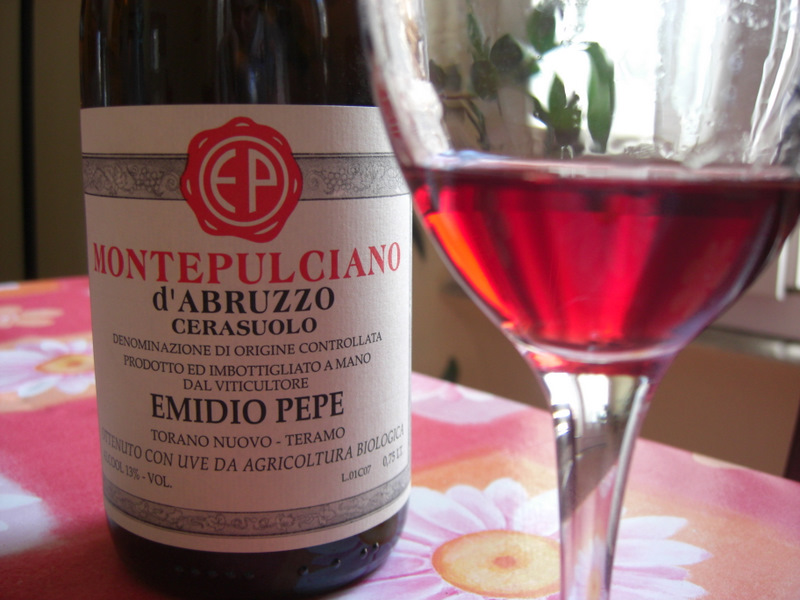
Cerasuolo is a rosato (rosé) wine made from Montepulciano.

A separate DOC since 2010, the rosé (Italian: rosato) style of Montepulciano d'Abruzzo is labeled as Cerasuolo which means "cherry-red" and relates to the deep color the wine gets even with very brief skin-contact with the highly pigmented skins of the Montepulciano grape. According to Bastianich, Cerasuolo tend to be medium-bodied and rather hearty for an Italian rosato with aromas of orange peel, cinnamon, strawberry and dried cherries. In 2010 the DOC classification was created for the wine, now known as Cerasuolo d'Abruzzo. The term Cerasuolo can also refer to Cerasuolo di Vittoria, an unrelated DOCG dry red wine from Sicily made from Nero d'Avola and Frappato.
