= Morellino di Scansano =

Italian wine with a controlled origin

Sangiovese

Morellino di Scansano DOCG is an Italian red wine made in the hilly environs of the village of Scansano, GR, in the Maremma region of coastal Tuscany, which has an ancient but obscure tradition of winemaking. Morellino is the local name for the Sangiovese grape variety. The wine, which was granted DOC status in 1978, then upgraded to DOCG status beginning with the 2007 vintage, is made from at least 85% Sangiovese, which is also the basis of the Tuscan wines Chianti, Brunello di Montalcino, and Vino Nobile di Montepulciano. The remaining 15% can comprise any non-aromatic black grape varieties included in a list made and periodically updated by Tuscan wine authorities.

== Appellation requirements ==
Morellino di Scansano does not need to age in wood and can be released in March after harvest, meaning that it can be found on the shelf at less than 8 months old, thus a fresh and crisp wine.

Morellino di Scansano Riserva can be released on 1 January two years after the harvest, at least one of which it has to age in wood.
