= Perricone =

Variety of grape

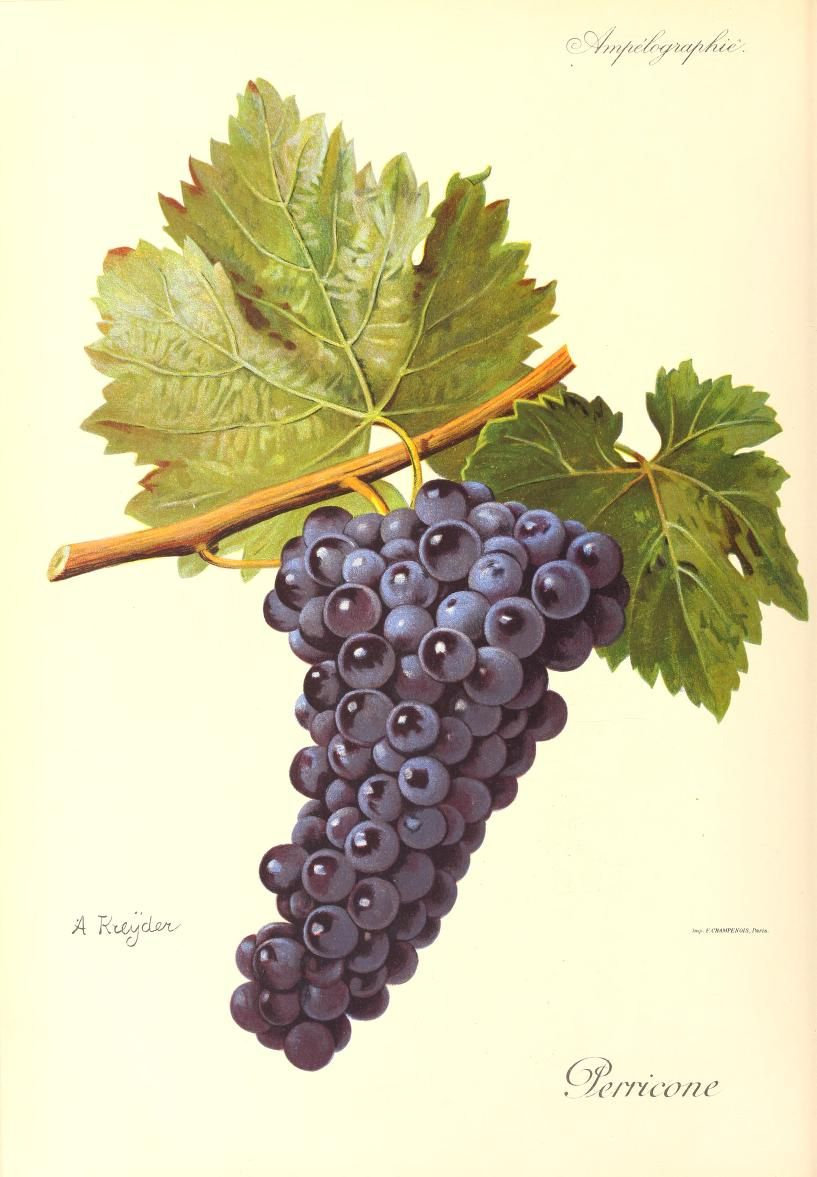
Illustration of the Perricone grape

Perricone (also known as Pignatello) is a red Italian wine grape variety that is grown in Sicily. In the late 20th century there was around 1000 hectares/2,500 acres of the grape planted throughout the island. Red berry flavors and medium alcohol content are commonly attributed to Perricone wines, but Oz Clarke describes them as full-bodied and alcoholic.

== DOC wines ==
In Sicily, Perricone is a permitted variety in the Contea di Sclafani DOC which includes vineyards in the Caltanissetta and Agrigento provinces. Here Perricone can be made as a varietal wine provided it represents at least 85% of the wine's total content or it can be used in the DOC red wine where together with Nero d'Avola (Calabrese) it must represent at least 50% of the blend with local varieties, such as Nerello Mascalese, and Sangiovese as well as international varieties like Cabernet Sauvignon, Merlot, Syrah and Pinot noir permitted to fill in the remainder of the blend. Perricone destined for Contea di Sclafani DOC wines must be harvested to a yield no greater than 14 tonnes/hectare with the finished wine attaining an alcohol level of at least 11%.

Similar laws governs Perricone's use in the Delia Nivolelli DOC located in the province of Trapani near Marsala where the grape can be made either as a varietal or blended with Nero d'Avola, Merlot, Cabernet Sauvignon, Syrah and Sangiovese. Grapes destined for this DOC wine have a maximum harvest yield of 14 tonnes/ha with a minimum alcohol level of the finished wine being 11.5%. A separate riserva wine can be made with Perricone provided the wine is aged a minimum of two years prior to release.

In the Eloro DOC, Perricone is known as Pignatello and produced as varietal wine when comprising at least 80% of the wine. It is also used in the DOC red and rosé along with Nero d'Avola and Frappato together making up at least 90% of the blend. Perricone destined for these DOC wines must be harvested to a yield no greater than 12 tonnes/ha with the finished red wines attaining a minimum alcohol level of 12% and the finished rosés having an alcohol level of at least 11.5%.

In the fortified dessert wine Marsala Perricone is the main component in the Rubino style where it is blended with Nero d'Avola (Calabrese) and/or Nerello Mascalese and a maximum of 30% white grape varieties such as Grillo, Inzolia, and Catarratto.

In the Monreale DOC Perricone can be made a varietal (at least 85% of the wine) or blended with Nero d'Avola (Calabrese) to make up at least 50% of the DOC red wine with International varieties, including Pinot noir permitted to make up the remainder. Perricone intended for the DOC wines are limited to yields of 11 tonnes/ha with the finished wines having a minimum alcohol level of 11%.

== Synonyms ==
Over the years Perricone has been known under a variety of synonyms including Cattarato rouge, Guarnaccia Nera, Nieddara, Niuru, Perricone Nera, Perricone Nero, Perricone noir, Picnatelo, Pignateddu, Pignatelle, Pignatello, Pirricone nera, Quarnaccia and Tuccarino di Catania.
