= Alcamo wine =

Wine DOC classification

Alcamo wine is produced under the DOC classification of Alcamo, Sicily. It is located in the Val di Mazara wine region in the province of Palermo about 30 kilometres (19 mi) south-west of the city of Palermo and just east of Trapani province.

In July 1972, the Alcamo DOC was applied to the wines produced in the nine different towns in the vicinity of Alcamo: Calatafimi, Castellammare del Golfo, Gibellina, Balestrate, Camporeale, Monreale, Partinico, San Cipirello and San Giuseppe Jato. Initially, it applied only to the white wines produced in the region. It is now also used for the red and rose wines produced in the region, following Local Wine Law 99.

== Grape varieties used for Alcamo wines ==
- Red wines - Nero d'Avola, as well as the non-native Cabernet Sauvignon, Merlot and Syrah
- White wines - Grillo, Catarratto, Inzolia, Grecanino and the non-native Sauvignon Blanc and Chardonnay

== Alcamo wine producers ==
28 producers sell wine under the Alcamo DOC:

Producer	Color	Varieties
Principe di Corleone Bianco Alcamo DOC	White	Catarratto
Firriato Alcamo Bianco	White	Catarratto
I Classici Alcamo Bianco DOC Firriato	White	Catarratto
Firriato Alcamo Bianco	White	Catarratto
Cantine Rallo Alcamo Carta d'Oro	White	Catarratto
Carta d'Oro" Catarratto Alcamo Dop Bio	White	Catarratto
Principe di Corleone Bianco Alcamo DOC	White	Catarratto
Principe di Corleone Bianco Alcamo DOC	White	Catarratto
Alcamo Bianco Û Duca di Castelmonte-Sizilien	White	Catarratto
Firriato I Classici Alcamo Bianco DOC	White	Catarratto
Firriato Bianco Alcamo DOC	White	Catarratto
Bianco Alcamo DOC -Firriato Firriato Sicilië	White	Catarratto
Cantina Foraci Alcamo Bianco Conte Ruggero	White	Catarratto
Cantine Rallo Alcamo Nero d'Avola	Red	Nero d'Avola
Rallo Alcamo Nero d'Avola Rosso di Sicilia DOC	Red	Nero d'Avola
Molino a Vento Alcamo Bianco Sigilia	White	Catarratto
Tenuta Rapitala	White	Catarratto
Alcamo. Cusumano	White	Catarratto
Ceuso Rosso IGT Sicilia Vigna Custera	Red	Blend of Nero d'Avola, Merlot, Cabernet Sauvignon
Rallo Carta d'Oro Bianco d'Alcamo DOC Sicilia	White	Catarratto
Foraci Conte Ruggero	White	Catarratto
Rapitala Cielo d'Alcamo	White	Catarratto
Firriato Alcamo	White	Catarratto
Bianco Alcamo Cantine Paolini 75	White	Catarratto
Solcanto" Rosso Alcamo DOC	Red	Nero d'Avola
Solcanto" Rosso Alcamo DOC	White	Catarratto
Rapitalà Alcamo	White	Catarratto
Pollara Giada Bianco	White	Catarratto
