= Italian wine =

Wine making in Italy

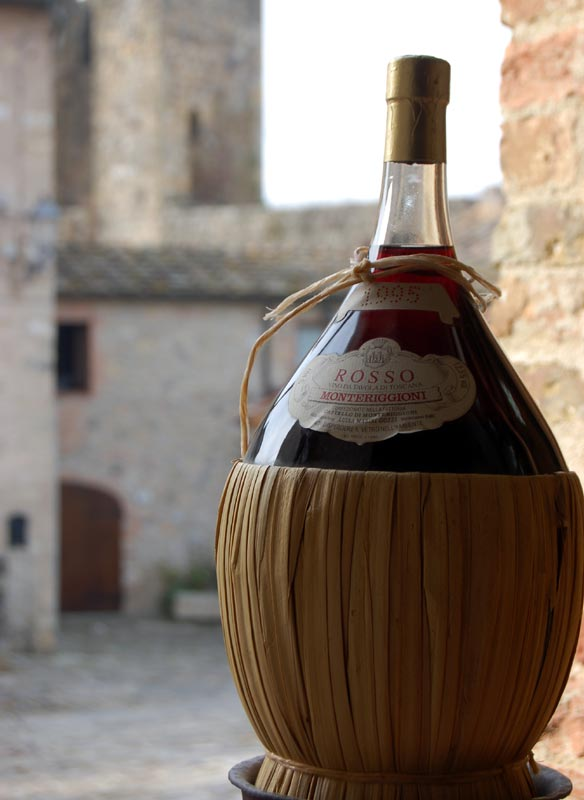
Tuscan Chianti in a traditional fiasco

Italian wine (Italian: vino italiano) is produced in every region of Italy. Italy is the country with the widest variety of indigenous grapevine in the world, with an area of 702,000 hectares (1.73 million acres) under vineyard cultivation, as well as the world's largest wine producer and the largest exporter as of 2024. Contributing 49.8 million hl of wine in 2022, Italy accounted for over 19.3% of global production, ahead of France (17.7%) and Spain (13.8%); the following year, production decreased by 11.5 million hl, and Italy was surpassed by France. Italian wine is also popular domestically among Italians, who consume a yearly average of 46.8 litres per capita, ranking third in world wine consumption.

The origins of vine-growing and winemaking in Italy has been illuminated by recent research, stretching back even before the Phoenician, Etruscans and Greek settlers, who produced wine in Italy before the Romans planted their own vineyards. The Romans greatly increased Italy's viticultural area using efficient viticultural and winemaking methods.

== History ==
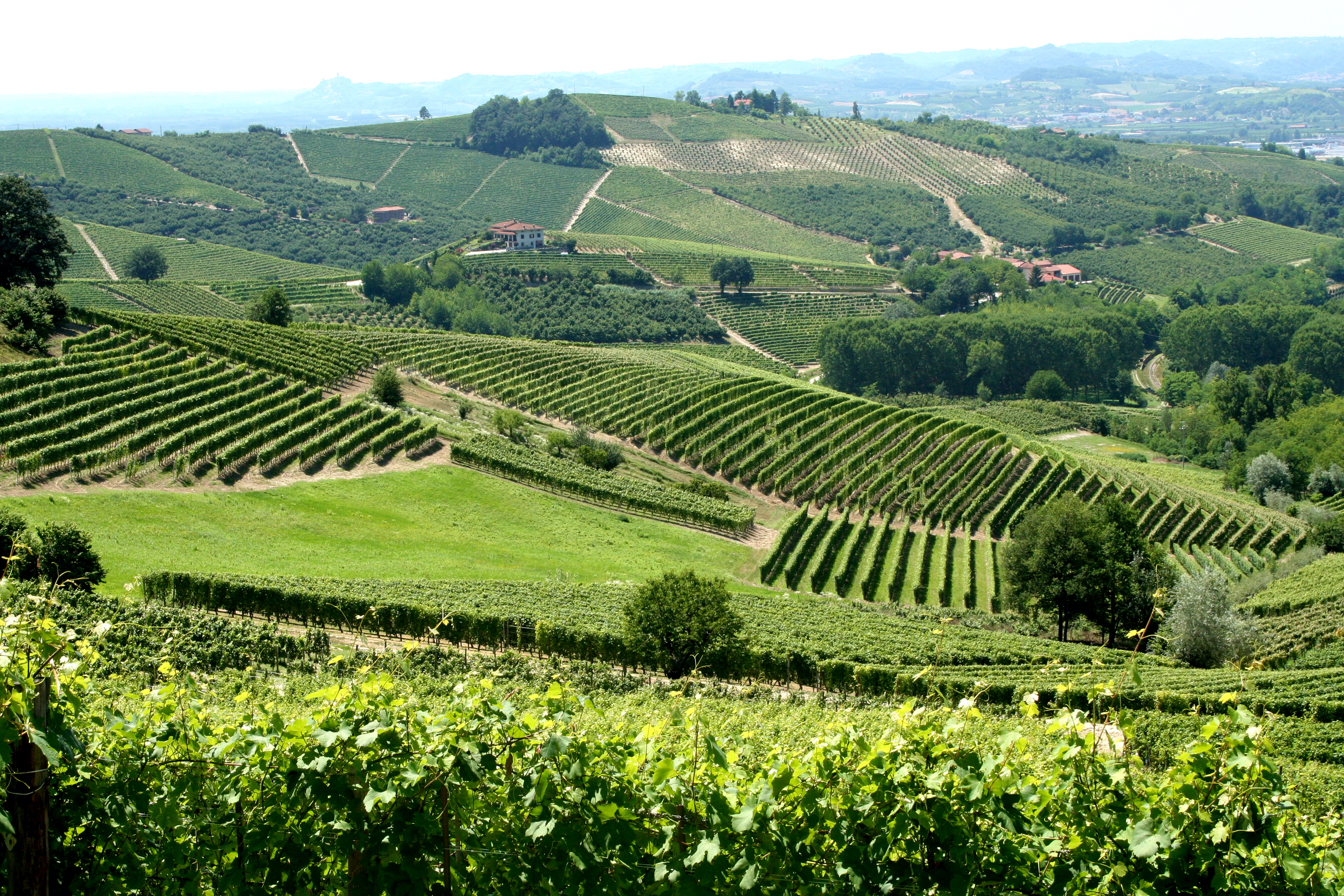
Vineyards in Langhe and Montferrat, Piedmont, the official name of a UNESCO World Heritage Site comprising "five distinct wine-growing areas with outstanding landscapes" and the Castle of Grinzane Cavour in the region of Piedmont, Italy

Vines have been cultivated from the wild Vitis vinifera grape for millennia in Italy. It was previously believed that viticulture had been introduced into Sicily and southern Italy by the Mycenaeans, as winemaking traditions are known to have already been established in Italy by the time the Phoenician and Greek colonists arrived on Italy's shores around 1000–800 BC. However, archeological discoveries on Monte Kronio in 2017 revealed that viticulture in Sicily flourished at least as far back as 4000 BC — some 3,000 years earlier than previously thought. Also on the peninsula, traces of Bronze Age and even Neolithic grapevine management and small-scale winemaking might suggest earlier origins than previously thought.

Under ancient Rome large-scale, slave-run plantations sprang up in many coastal areas of Italy and spread to such an extent that, in AD 92, Emperor Domitian was forced to destroy a great number of vineyards in order to free up fertile land for food production.

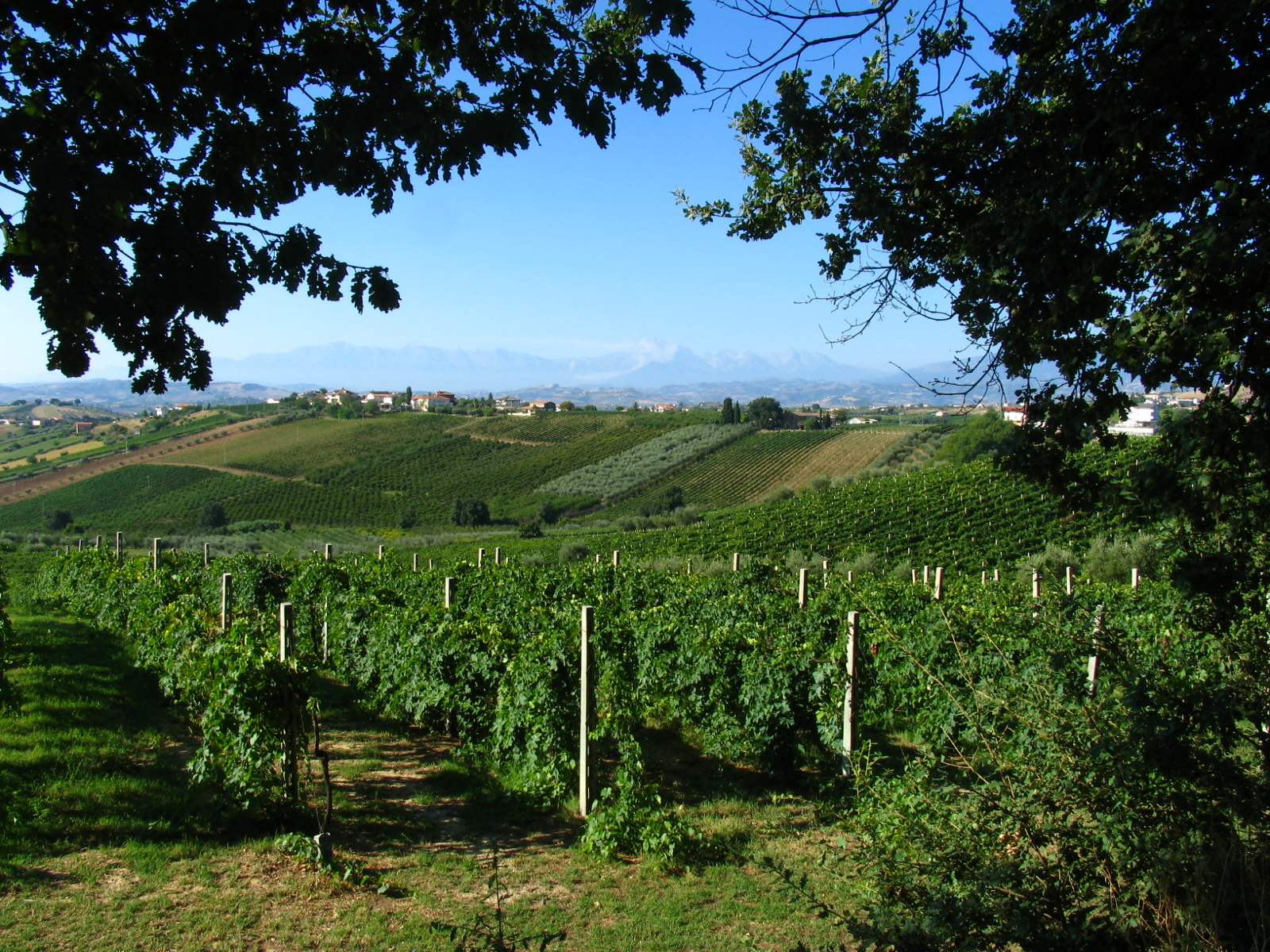
A typical Italian vineyard scene, with vines growing alongside olive trees

During this time, viticulture outside of Italy was prohibited under Roman law. Exports to the provinces were reciprocated in exchange for more slaves, especially from Gaul. Trade was intense with Gaul, according to Pliny, because the inhabitants tended to drink Italian wine unmixed and without restraint. Although unpalatable to adults, it was customary, at the time, for young people to drink wine mixed with a good proportion of water.

As the laws on provincial viticulture were relaxed, vast vineyards began to flourish in the rest of Europe, especially Gaul (present-day France) and Hispania. This coincided with the cultivation of new vines, such as biturica, an ancestor of the Cabernets. These vineyards became so successful that Italy ultimately became an import centre for provincial wines.

Depending on the vintage, modern Italy is the world's largest or second-largest wine producer. In 2005, production was about 20% of the global total, second only to France, which produced 26%. In the same year, Italy's share in dollar value of table wine imports into the U.S. was 32%, Australia's was 24%, and France's was 20%. Along with Australia, Italy's market share has rapidly increased in recent years.

== Italian appellation system ==
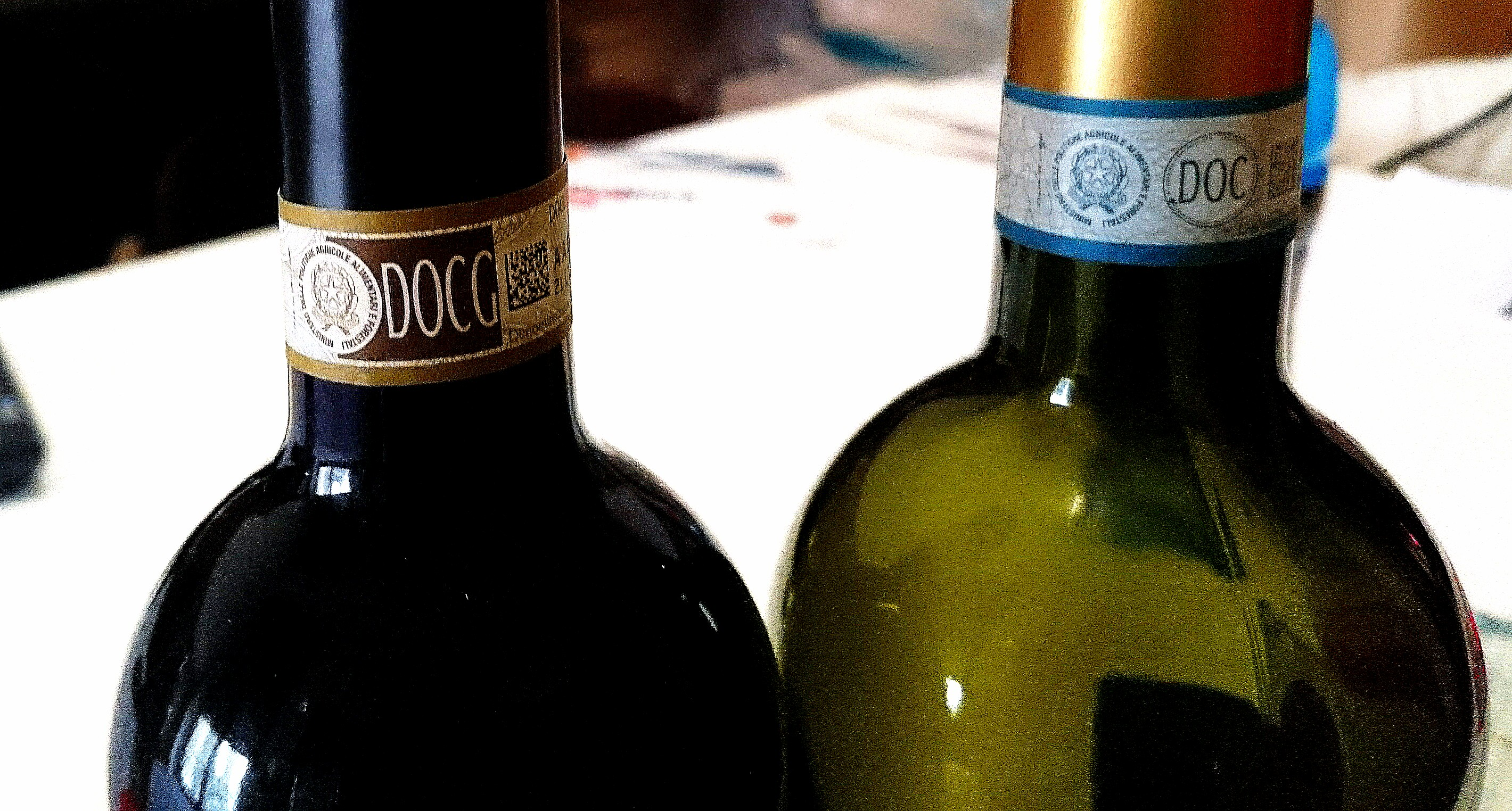
DOCG and DOC labels on two Italian wine bottles

In 1963, the first official Italian system of classification of wines was launched. Since then, several modifications and additions to the legislation have been made, including a major modification in 1992. The last modification, which occurred in 2010, established four basic categories which are consistent with the latest European Union wine regulations (2008–09). The Italian Ministry of Agriculture (MIPAAF) regularly publishes updates to the official classification. The categories, from the bottom to the top level, are:

- Vini da tavola ("table wines"). At the lowest level are table wines (VdT). VdT wines are mandatory to include on the label the production batch, the volume of the container, the bottler's data, the place of bottling and vinification (if different places take place), the alcohol content, the gasification (if existing), the phrase "contains sulphites" only if the threshold of 10 mg/L of sulfur dioxide is exceeded. The specification of the color is optional, while the mention of the grape variety is not foreseen.
- Vini IGT ("typical geographical indication wines"). IGT wines comply with European Community regulation Nr.823 of 1987. Indication of the grape variety, production year and production area are optional.
- Vini DOC ("controlled designation of origin wines"). In addition to what is foreseen for IGT wines, the labels of DOC wines must specify the production areas more precisely. These wines cannot be produced with grapes intended for IGT wines, and must necessarily be subjected to chemical-physical and organoleptic analyzes during the production phase. The DOC recognition is exclusively reserved for wines produced in areas recognized as IGT for at least five years. The sub-areas where they are produced can optionally be mentioned on the label. On the label it is possible to mention further characteristics of the wine (e.g. classic, superior). The year of production must be mentioned on the label.
- Vini DOCG ("controlled and guaranteed designation of origin wines"). DOCG wines are subject to more restrictive regulations than those of DOC wines. The DOCG denomination is applied only to wines that have been recognized as DOC for at least seven years and are of particular quality. During bottling, chemical-physical and organoleptic analysis is mandatory, batch by batch, and the individual bottles are marked with a control band placed in such a way as to be damaged when the bottle is opened.

== Geographical characteristics ==
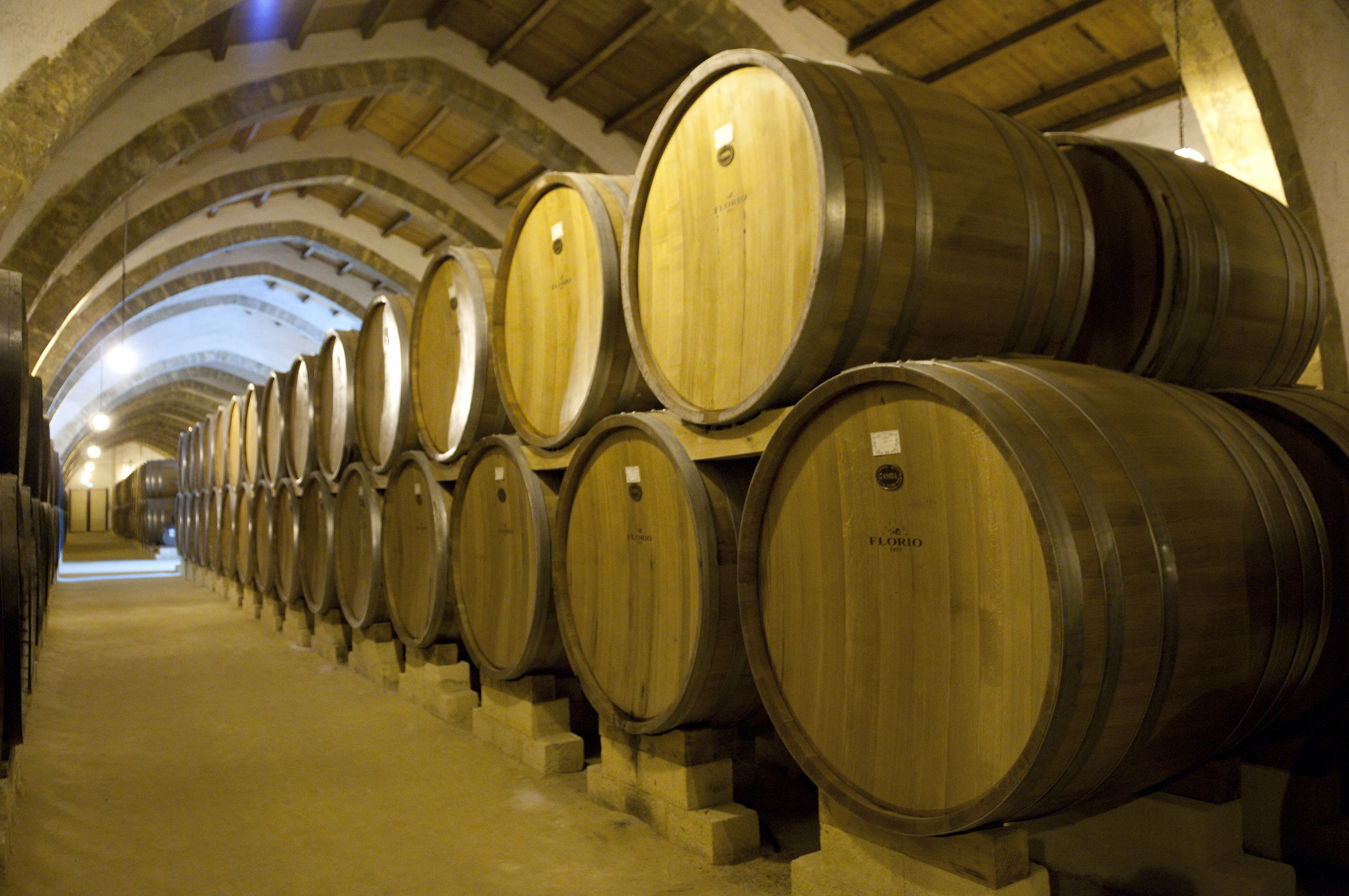
Wine barrels in Sicily

Important wine-relevant geographic characteristics of Italy include:

- The extensive latitudinal range of the country permits wine growing from the Alps in the north to almost-within-sight of Africa in the south.
- The fact that Italy is a peninsula with a long shoreline contributes to moderating climate effects to coastal wine regions.
- Italy's mountainous and hilly terrain provides a variety of altitudes and climate and soil conditions for grape growing.

== Italian wine areas ==
The main wine production areas in Italy, with the wine-growing areas, the main vines (the native ones in italics) and the main wines produced:

Region	Wine-growing region	Main grape varieties	Main wines
Abruzzo			Montepulciano d'Abruzzo; Trebbiano d'Abruzzo; Terre Tollesi
Aosta Valley			Valle d'Aosta DOC
Apulia	Monti Dauni; Salento	Nero di Troia	Primitivo di Manduria
Basilicata		Vulture	Aglianico del Vulture
Friuli-Venezia Giulia	Gorizia Hills; Carso		Collio Goriziano
Lazio	Frascati		Frascati DOC
Lombardy	Valtellina		Sforzato di Valtellina; Valtellina superiore
Lombardy	Franciacorta		Franciacorta DOCG
Lombardy	Oltrepò Pavese	Riesling; Syrah	
Piedmont	Langhe	Nebbiolo; Arneis	Barbaresco; Barolo; Langhe Arneis
Piedmont	Roero	Barbera	Roero Arneis
Piedmont	Montferrat	Dolcetto	Barbera del Monferrato
Piedmont		Grignolino	
Piedmont		Pelaverga	Verduno Pelaverga
Piedmont			Ruché di Castagnole Monferrato
Piedmont		Cortese	Gavi
Piedmont	Canavese	Erbaluce	Erbaluce di Caluso; Canavese bianco
Piedmont			Dolcetto di Dogliani
Tuscany	Chianti	Sangiovese	Chianti; Chianti Superiore
Umbria	Montefalco		Montefalco Sagrantino
Sardinia	Terralba; Oristano; Bosa	Bovale	Bovale; Vermentino; Malvasia
Sicily	Val di Mazara	Catarratto; Grillo; Inzolia; Zibibbo; Nero d'Avola	Marsala; Alcamo; Erice
Sicily	Val Demone	Nerello Mascalese; Carricante; Malvasia delle Lipari	Etna; Faro
Sicily	Val di Noto	Nero d'Avola; Frappato; Inzolia	Cerasuolo di Vittoria
Veneto	Colline del Prosecco di Conegliano e Valdobbiadene	Glera	Prosecco
Veneto	Valpolicella	Corvina; Corvinone; Rondinella	Amarone della Valpolicella; Valpolicella Ripasso

== Italian grape varieties ==
Italy is the country with the widest variety of indigenous grapevine in the world. Italy's Ministry of Agriculture and Forestry (MIPAAF), has documented over 350 grapes and granted them "authorized" status. There are more than 500 other documented varieties in circulation as well. The following is a list of the most common and important of Italy's many grape varieties.

=== Bianco (White) ===
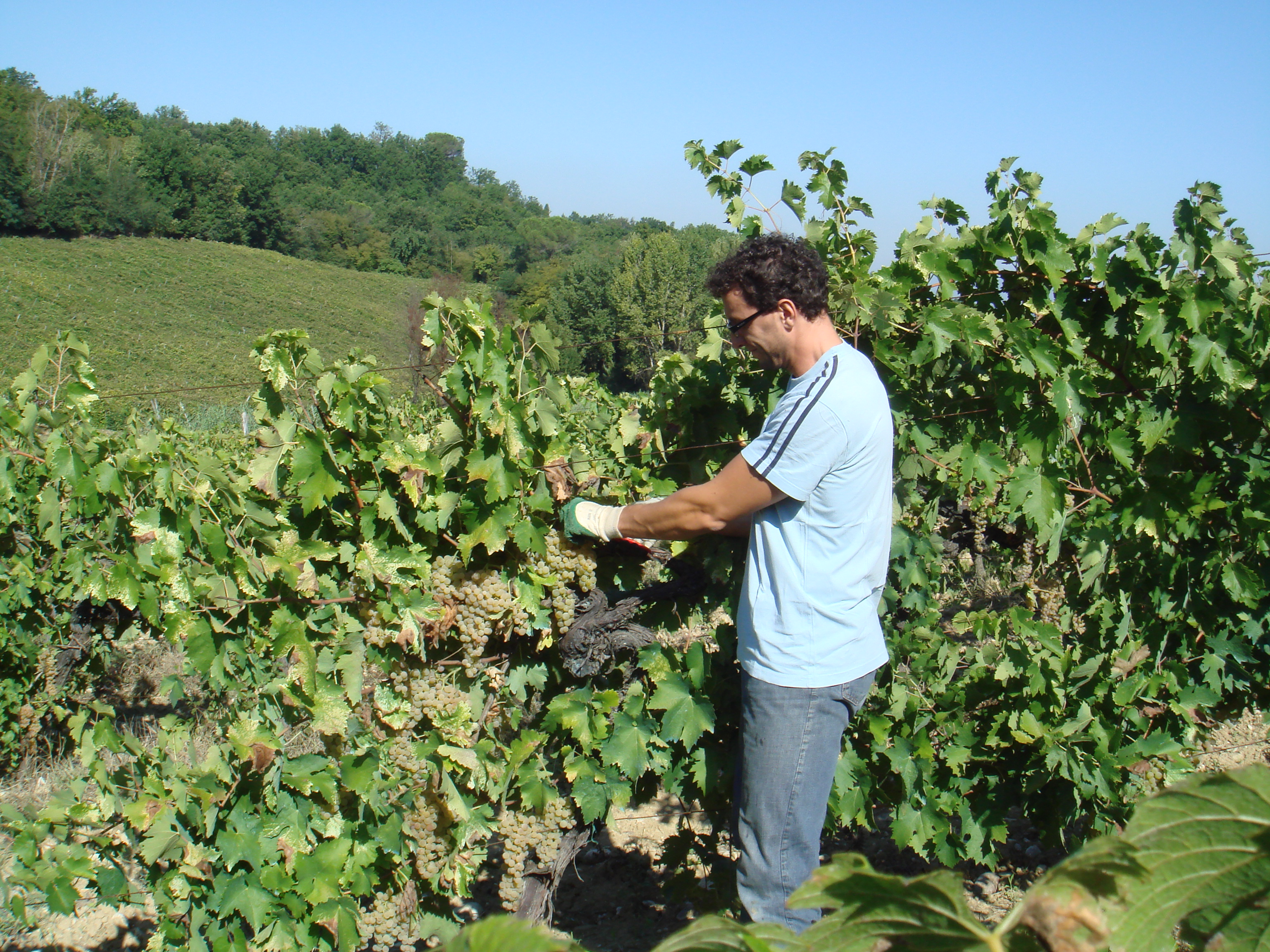
Trebbiano grapes in the Marche region

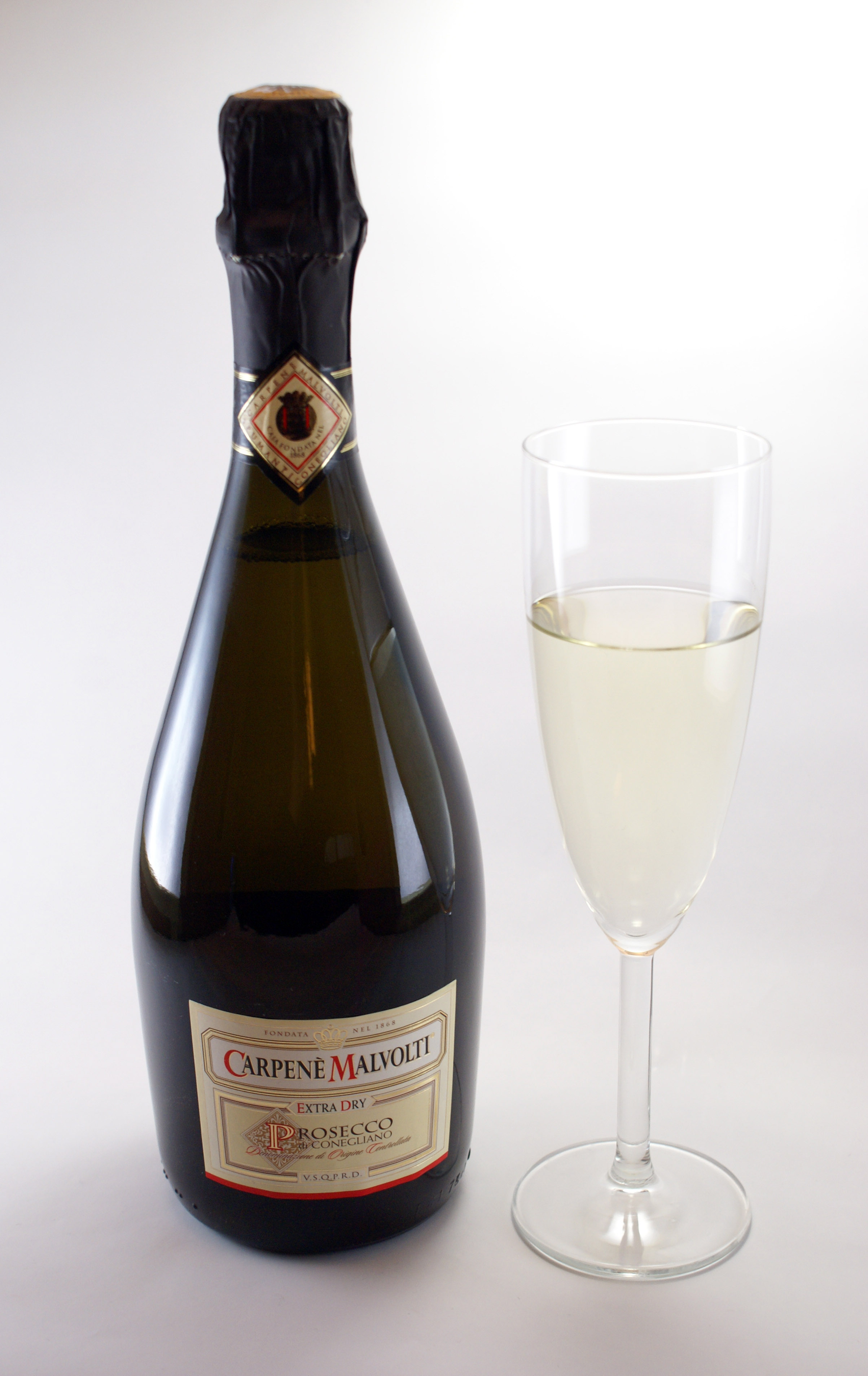
A bottle of Prosecco di Conegliano spumante extra dry and a glass of Prosecco frizzante, which stops forming bubbles soon after it is poured

- Arneis: a variety from Piedmont, which has been grown there since the 15th century.
- Catarratto: common in Sicily and the most widely planted white variety in Salaparuta.
- Fiano: grown on the southwest coast of Italy.
- Friulano: a variety also known as Sauvignon Vert or Sauvignonasse, it yields one of the most typical wines of Friuli. The wine was previously known as Tocai but the old name was prohibited by the European Court of Justice to avoid confusion with the Tokay dessert wine from Hungary.
- Garganega: the main grape variety for wines labelled Soave and Custoza, this is a dry white wine from the Veneto wine region of Italy. It is popular in northeast Italy around the city of Verona. Currently, there are over 3,500 distinct producers of Soave.
- Greco: grown on the southwest coast of Italy.
- Malvasia bianca: a white variety that occurs throughout Italy. It has many clones and mutations.
- Moscato blanc: grown mainly in Piedmont, it is mainly used in the slightly sparkling (frizzante), semi-sweet Moscato d'Asti. Not to be confused with Moscato Giallo and Moscato Rosa, two varietals that are grown in Trentino Alto-Adige.
- Nuragus: an ancient Sardinian variety found in southern Sardegna, producing light and tart wines usually consumed as aperitifs.
- Passerina: mainly derives from Passerina grapes (it may even be produced purely with these), plus a minimum percentage of other white grapes and may be still, sparkling or passito. The still version has an acidic profile, which is typical of these grapes.
- Pecorino: native to Marche and Abruzzo, it is used in the Falerio dei Colli Ascolani and Offida DOC wines. It is low-yielding but will ripen early and at high altitudes. Pecorino wines have a rich, aromatic character.
- Pigato: an acidic variety from Liguria that is vinified to pair with seafood.
- Pinot grigio: a commercial grape (known as Pinot Gris in France), its wines are characterized by crispness and cleanness. The wine can range from mild to full-bodied.
- Ribolla Gialla: a Greek variety introduced by the Venetians that now makes its home in Friuli.
- Trebbiano: this is the most widely planted white varietal in Italy. It is grown throughout the country, with a special focus on the wines from Abruzzo and from Lazio, including Frascati. Trebbiano from producers such as Valentini have been known to age for 15+ years. It is known as Ugni blanc in France.
- Verdicchio or Trebbiano di Lugana: this is grown in the areas of Castelli di Jesi and Matelica in the Marche region and gives its name to the varietal white wine made from it. The name comes from "verde" (green).
- Vermentino: this is widely planted in Sardinia and is also found in Tuscan and Ligurian coastal districts. The wines are a popular accompaniment to seafood.

Other important whites include Carricante, Coda de Volpe, Cortese, Falanghina, Grechetto, Grillo, Inzolia, Picolit, Traminer, Verduzzo, and Vernaccia.

=== Rosso (red) ===
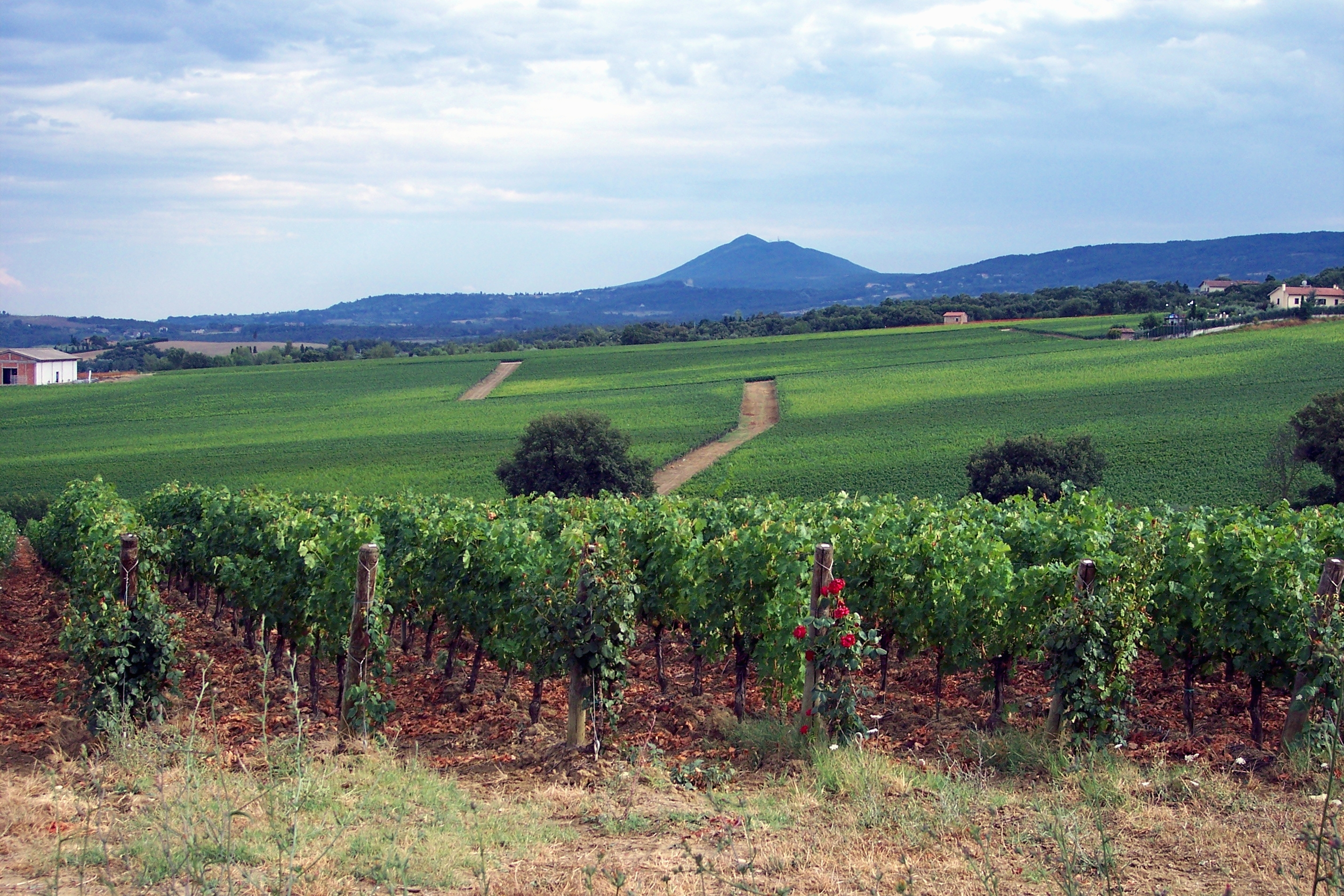
Sangiovese vineyards in the Val d'Orcia, with Monte Amiata in the background, in the Tuscany region

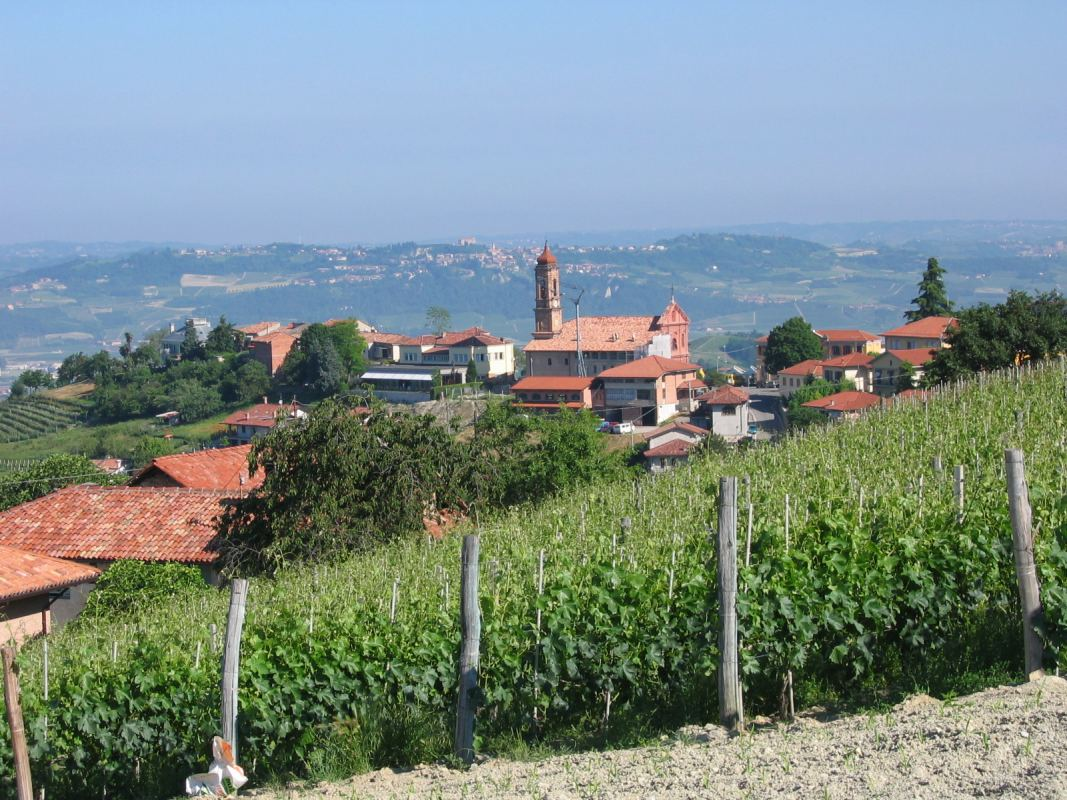
Nebbiolo vineyards in Alba, in the Piedmont region

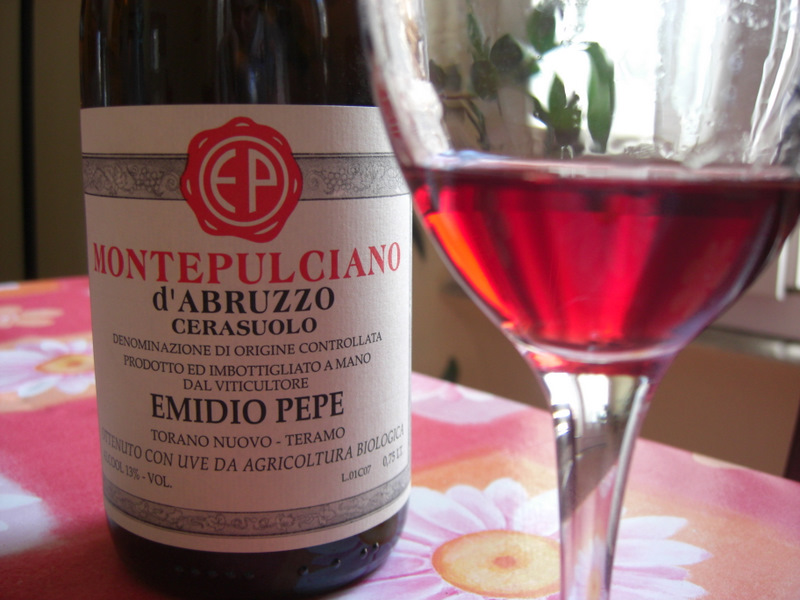
A Montepulciano d'Abruzzo wine made from the Montepulciano grape, in the Abruzzo region

- Aglianico: considered to be one of the three greatest Italian varieties with Sangiovese and Nebbiolo, and sometimes called "The Barolo of the South" (il Barolo del Sud) due to its ability to produce fine wines. It is primarily grown in Basilicata and Campania to produce DOCG wines, Aglianico del Vulture Superiore and Taurasi.
- Barbera: the most widely grown red wine grape of the Piedmont and southern Lombardy regions, the largest plantings of Barbera are found near the towns of Asti, Alba, and Pavia. In the Asti region, Barbera grapes are used in making "Barbera d'Asti Superiore", which may be aged in French barriques to become Nizza, a quality wine aimed at the international market. The vine has bright cherry-coloured fruit, and its wine is acidic with a dark colour.
- Corvina: along with the varieties Rondinella and Molinara, this is the principal grape which makes the famous wines of the Veneto: Valpolicella and Amarone. Valpolicella wine has dark cherry fruit and spice. After the grapes undergo passito (a drying process), the wine is now called Amarone, and is high in alcohol (16% and up) and characterized by raisin, prune, and syrupy fruits. Some Amarones can age for 40+ years and command spectacular prices. The same method used for Amarone is used for Recioto, the oldest wine produced in this area, but the difference is that Recioto is a sweet wine.
- Dolcetto: a grape that grows alongside Barbera and Nebbiolo in Piedmont, its name means 'little sweet one', referring not to the taste of the wine. Flavours of concord grape, wild blackberries, and herbs permeate the wine.
- Malvasia nera: red Malvasia variety from Piedmont. A sweet and perfumed wine, sometimes pronounced in the passito style.
- Montepulciano: not to be confused with the Tuscan town of Montepulciano, it is the most widely planted grape on the opposite coast in Abruzzo. Its wines develop silky plum-like fruit notes, friendly acidity, and light tannins.
- Nebbiolo: the noblest of Italy's varieties. The name (meaning "little fog") refers to the autumn fog that blankets most of Piedmont where Nebbiolo is chiefly grown, and where it achieves the most successful results. A difficult grape variety to cultivate, it produces the most renowned Barolo and Barbaresco, made in the province of Cuneo, along with the lesser-known Ghemme and Gattinara, made in the provinces of Novara and Vercelli respectively, and Sforzato, Inferno and Sassella made in Valtellina.
- Negroamaro: the name literally means 'black bitter'. A widely planted grape with its concentration in the region of Puglia, it is the backbone of the Salice Salentino.
- Nero d'Avola: this native varietal wine of Sicily has dark fruit notes and strong tannins.
- Primitivo: a red grape found in southern Italy, most notably in Apulia. Primitivo ripens early and thrives in warm climates, where it can achieve very high alcohol levels.
- Sagrantino: a rare native of Umbria, as of 2010, it is planted on only 994 hectares (2,460 acres). Montefalco Sagrantino and Montefalco Rosso wines can also age for many years.
- Sangiovese: it is most notably the predominant grape variety in Chianti and Chianti Classico, and the sole ingredient in Brunello di Montalcino. Sangiovese is also a major constituent of dozens of other denominations, such as Vino Nobile di Montepulciano, Rosso di Montalcino and Montefalco Rosso, as well as the basis of many of the "Super Tuscans", where it is blended with three of the Bordeaux varietals (Cabernet Sauvignon, Merlot, and Cabernet Franc) and typically aged in French oak barrels, resulting in a wine primed for the international market in the style of a typical California cabernet: oaky, high-alcohol, and a ripe, fruit-forward profile.

Other major red varieties are Cannonau, Ciliegiolo, Gaglioppo, Lagrein, Lambrusco, Monica, Nerello Mascalese, Pignolo, Refosco, Schiava, Schioppettino, Teroldego, and Uva di Troia.

== Super Tuscans ==
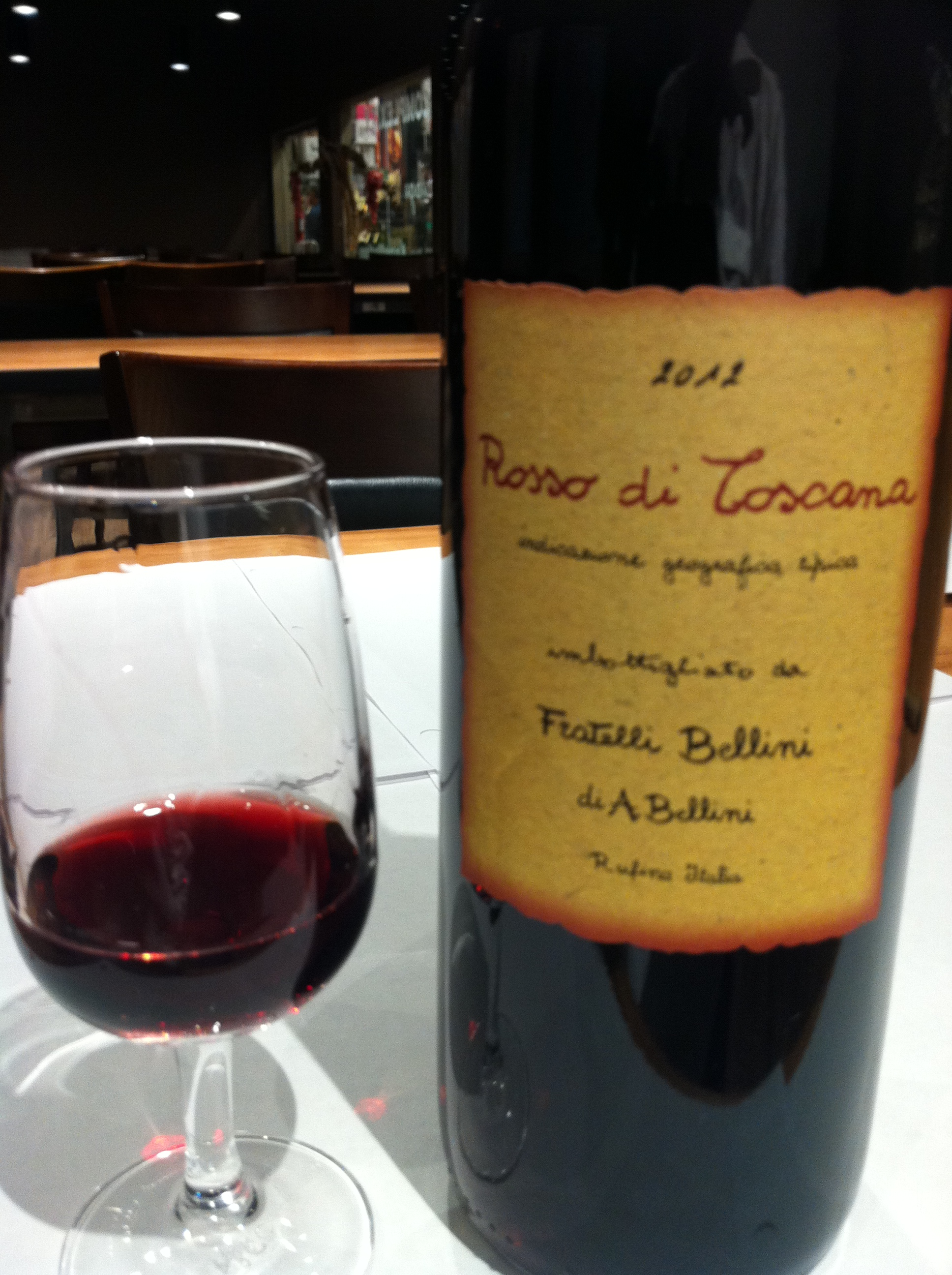
Tuscan wine

The term Super Tuscan (mostly used in the English-speaking world and less known in Italy) describes any wine (mostly red, but sometimes also white) produced in Tuscany that generally does not adhere to the traditional local DOC or DOCG regulations. As a result, Super Tuscans are usually Toscana IGT wines, while others are Bolgheri DOC, a designation of origin rather open to international grape varieties. Traditional Tuscan DOC(G)s require that wines are made from native grapes and mostly Sangiovese. While sometimes Super Tuscans are actually produced by Sangiovese alone, they are also often obtained by (1) blending Sangiovese with international grapes (such as Cabernet Sauvignon, Merlot, Cabernet Franc, and Syrah) to produce red wines, (2) blending international grapes alone (especially classic Bordeaux grapes for reds; Chardonnay and Sauvignon blanc for whites), or (3) using one single international variety.

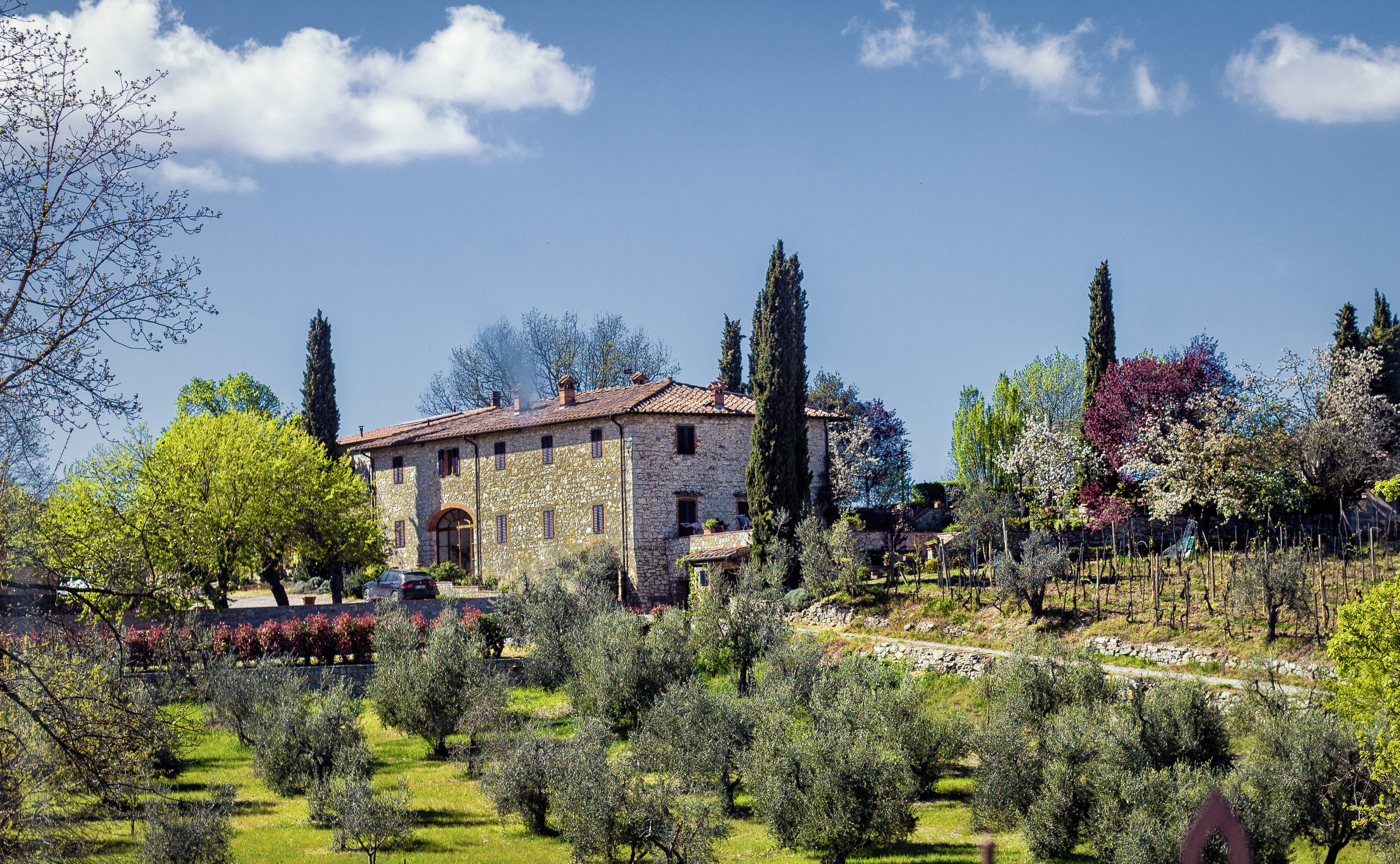
Poggio Amorelli, a typical winery of Chianti region

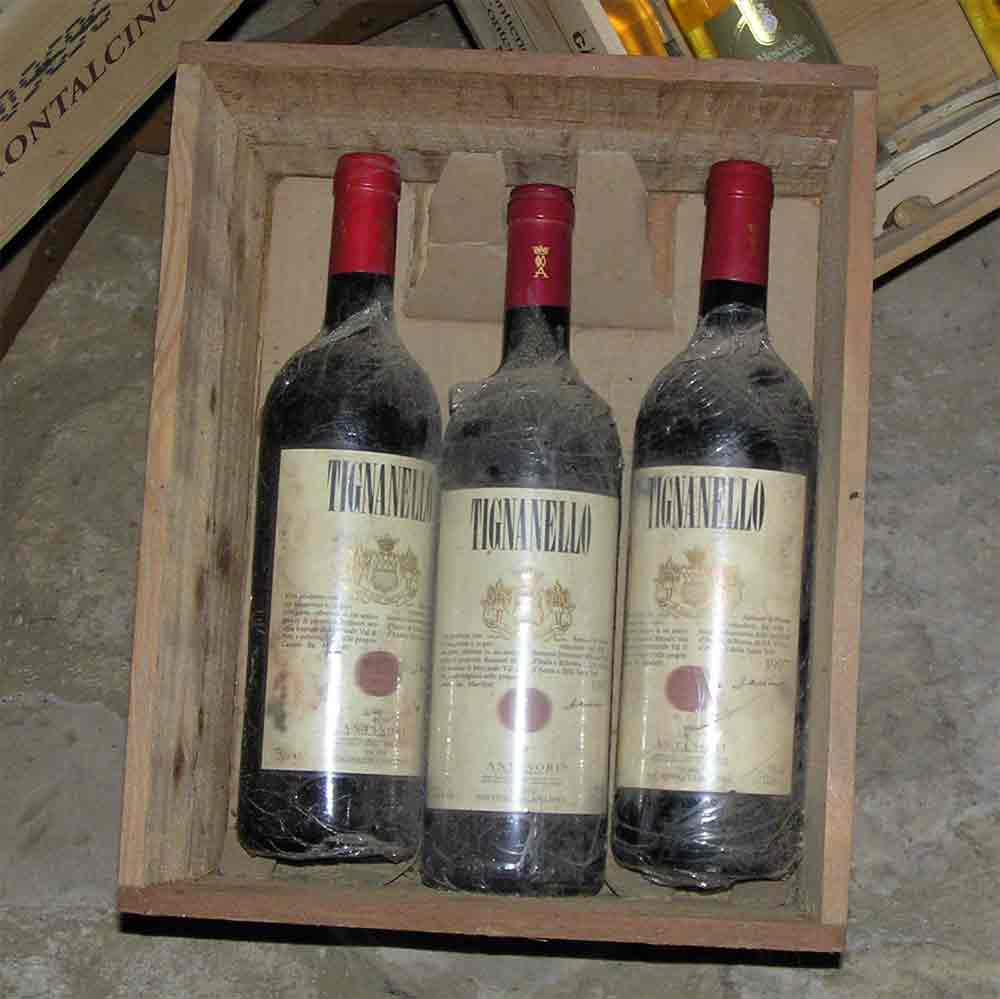
Tignanello, one of the early Super Tuscans

Although an extraordinary amount of wines claim to be "the first Super Tuscan", most would agree that this credit belongs to Sassicaia, the brainchild of marchese Mario Incisa della Rocchetta, who planted Cabernet Sauvignon at his Tenuta San Guido estate in Bolgheri back in 1944. It was for many years the marchese's personal wine, until, starting with the 1968 vintage, it was released commercially in 1971.

In 1968 Azienda Agricola San Felice produced a Super Tuscan called Vigorello, and in the 1970s Piero Antinori, whose family had been making wine for more than 600 years, also decided to make a richer wine by eliminating the white grapes from the Chianti blend, and instead, adding Bordeaux varietals (namely, Cabernet Sauvignon and Merlot). He was inspired by Sassicaia, of which he was given the sale agency by his uncle Mario Incisa della Rocchetta. The result was one of the first Super Tuscans, which he named Tignanello, after the vineyard where the grapes were grown. What was formerly Chianti Classico Riserva Vigneto Tignanello, was pulled from the DOC in 1971, first eliminating the white grapes (then compulsory in Chianti DOC) and gradually adding French varieties. By 1975, Tignanello was made with 85% Sangiovese, 10% Cabernet Sauvignon, and 5% Cabernet Franc, and it remains so today.

Because these wines did not conform to strict DOC(G) classifications, they were initially labelled as vino da tavola (lit. 'table wine'), an old official category ordinarily reserved for lower quality wines. The creation of the indicazione geografica tipica category (technically indicating a level of quality between vino da tavola and DOC(G)) in 1992 and the DOC Bolgheri label in 1994 helped bring Super Tuscans "back into the fold" from a regulatory standpoint. Since the pioneering work of the Super Tuscans, there has been a rapid expansion in the production of high-quality wines throughout Italy that do not qualify for DOC or DOCG classification.

== Wine guides ==
Many international wine guides and wine publications rate the most popular Italian wines. Among the Italian publications, Gambero Rosso is probably the most influential. In particular, the wines that are annually given the highest rating of "three glasses" (Tre Bicchieri) attract much attention. Recently, other guides, such as Slow Wine, published by Slow Food Italia, and Bibenda, compiled by the Fondazione Italiana Sommelier, have also gained attention both among professionals and amateurs.

== Vino cotto and vincotto ==
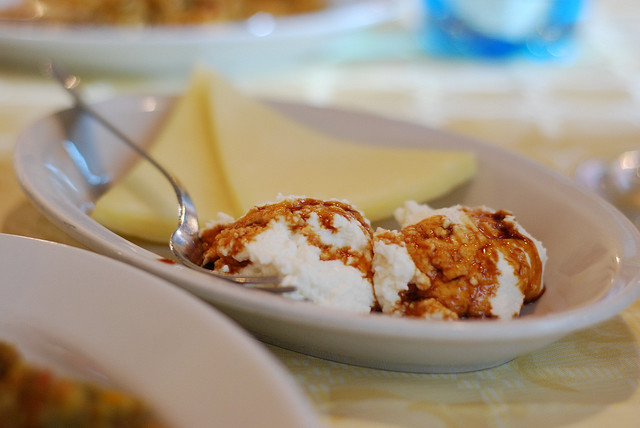
Ricotta with vincotto

Vino cotto (lit. 'cooked wine') is a form of wine from the Marche and Abruzzo regions of central Italy. It is typically made by individuals for their own use as it cannot legally be sold as wine. The must, from any of several local varieties of grapes, is heated in a copper vessel where it is reduced in volume by up to a third before fermenting in old wooden barrels. It can be aged for years, barrels being topped up with each harvest. The Marche authorities have set down a specification for the method of production of vino cotto.

Vincotto, typically from Basilicata and Apulia regions, also starts as a cooked must but is not fermented, resulting in a sweet syrup suitable for the preparation of sweets and soft drinks. In Roman times it was known as sapa in Latin and epsima in Greek, the same names that are often used for it, respectively, in Italy and Cyprus.

== See also ==
- History of Chianti
- List of Italian DOC wines
- List of Italian DOCG wines
- List of Italian IGT wines
- Old World wine
