= Minella bianca =

Variety of grape

Minella bianca is a white Italian wine grape variety that is indigenous to the island of Sicily where it is grown in the foothills of Mount Etna. The name Minella is derived from the Sicilian word minna (or "small breast") to which the berries have some resemblance due to their elongated shape. Minella bianca is very rarely seen as a varietal and is most often used in field blends with Carricante and Catarratto bianco.

== History and name ==
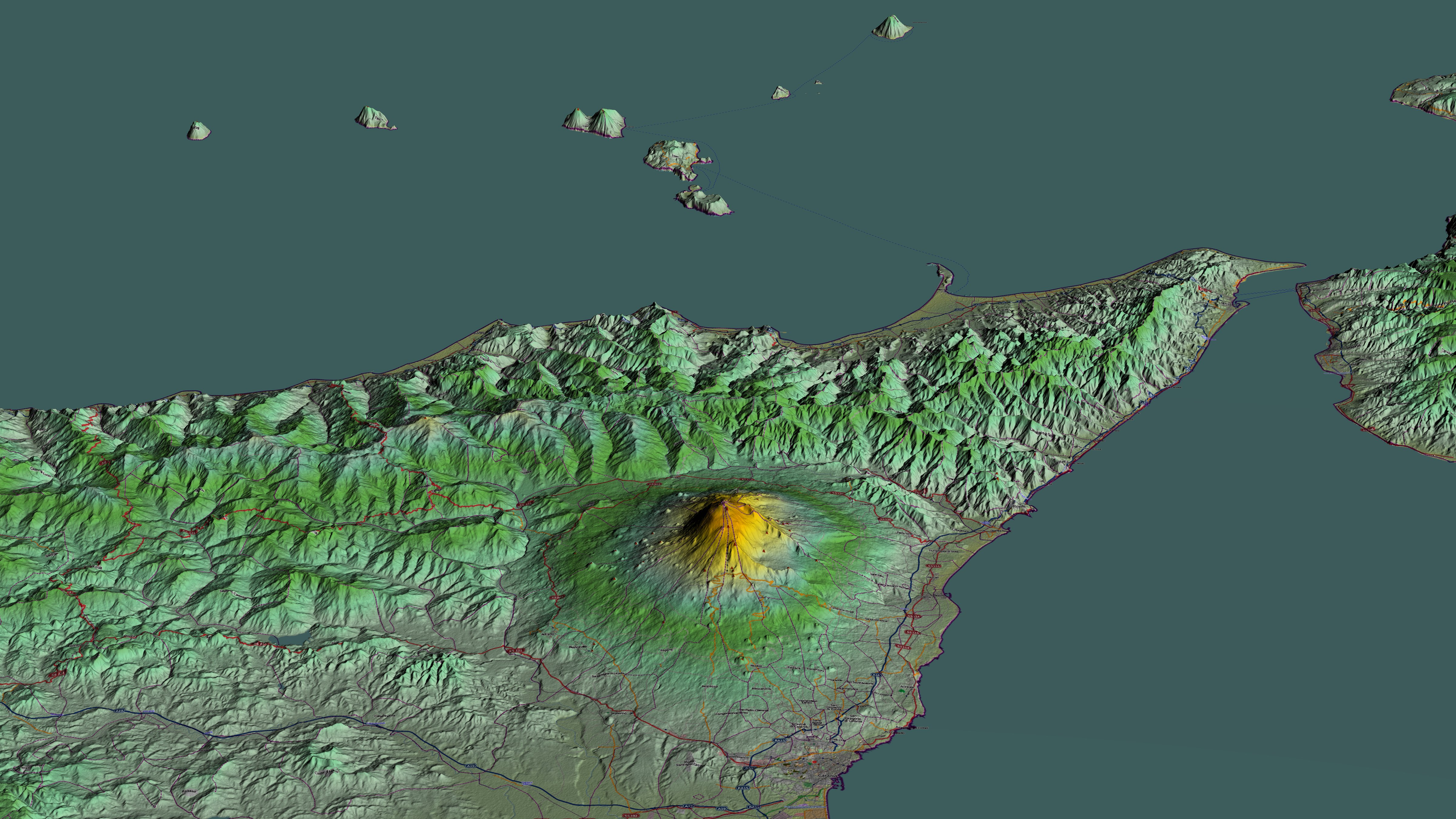
Ampelographers believe that Minella bianca originated in the foothills around Mount Etna in the eastern part of Sicily.

The grape was first described in 1760 by the Italian writer and traveler Domenico Sestini as growing in the foothills of Mount Etna where ampelographers believe that the grape originated from. The grape's name, Minella, is derived from the Sicilian minna which means breast and refers to the berries' shape.

== Viticulture ==
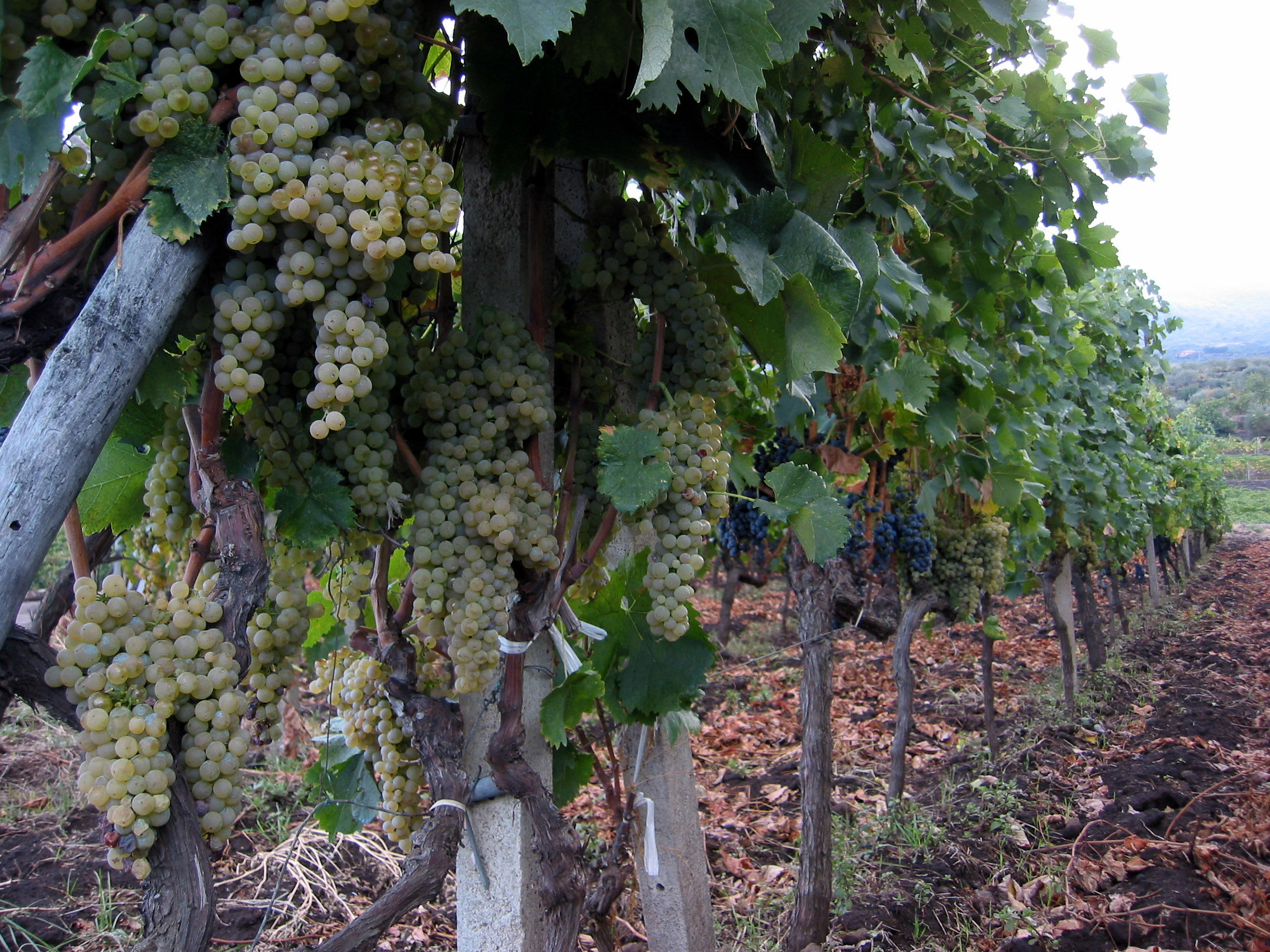
In Sicily, Minella bianca is often inter-planted with other Sicilian wine grapes of both red and white wine varieties.

Minella bianca is an early ripening grape variety that is often one of the first wine grapes to be harvested in a vintage, usually around mid-September, followed by Carricante. In some vineyards Minella bianca is part of a field blend and is inter-planted with other Sicilian wine grapes such as Carricante and Catarratto or even the red wine grape Nerello Mascalese.

== Wine regions ==
Minella bianca is almost exclusively found on the island of Sicily with ampelographers believing that the grape is indigenous to the island. In 2000, there were 86 hectares (210 acres) of the grape planted, the vast majority of which were found in the province of Catania around the foothills of Mount Etna. Here the grape is a permitted grape variety in the Denominazione di origine controllata (DOC) white wines of Etna. Further west, the province of Enna is home to a few scattered plantings of Minella bianca.

== Styles ==
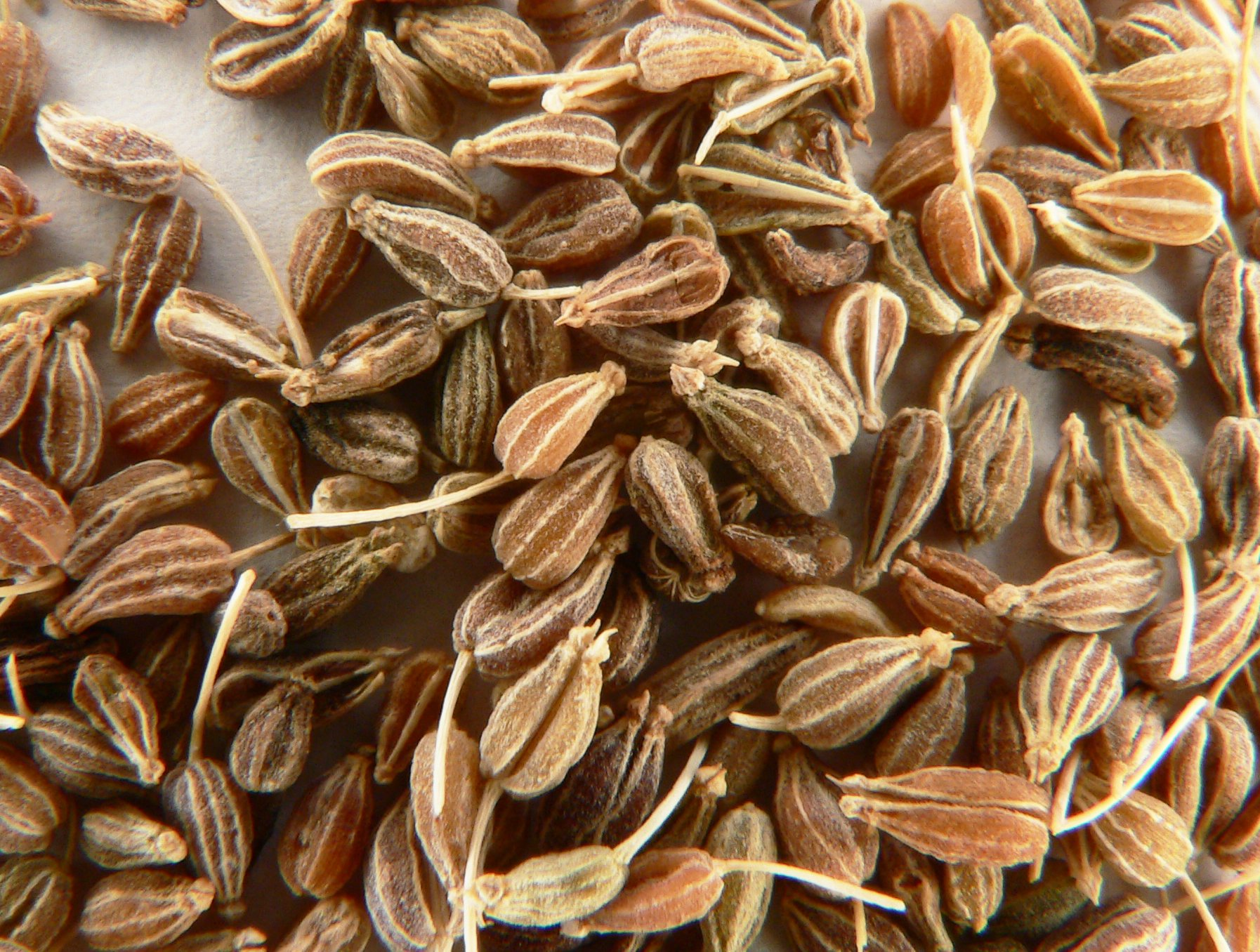
Aniseed is a characteristic aroma note of wines made from Minella bianca.

According to Master of Wine Jancis Robinson, Minella bianca tends to produce dry, aromatic wines that are characterized by aroma notes of aniseed. The grape is rarely made as a single varietal and is most often included in a blend with Catarrato and Carricante such as in the DOC wines of Etna Bianco.

== Synonyms ==
Over the years, Minella bianca has been known under a variety of synonyms including: Eppula, Minedda bianca, Minnedda bainca, Minnedda bianca, Minnedda bianca de Catane, Minnedda Ianca and Minella.
