= Marsala wine =

Fortified wine from Sicily, Italy

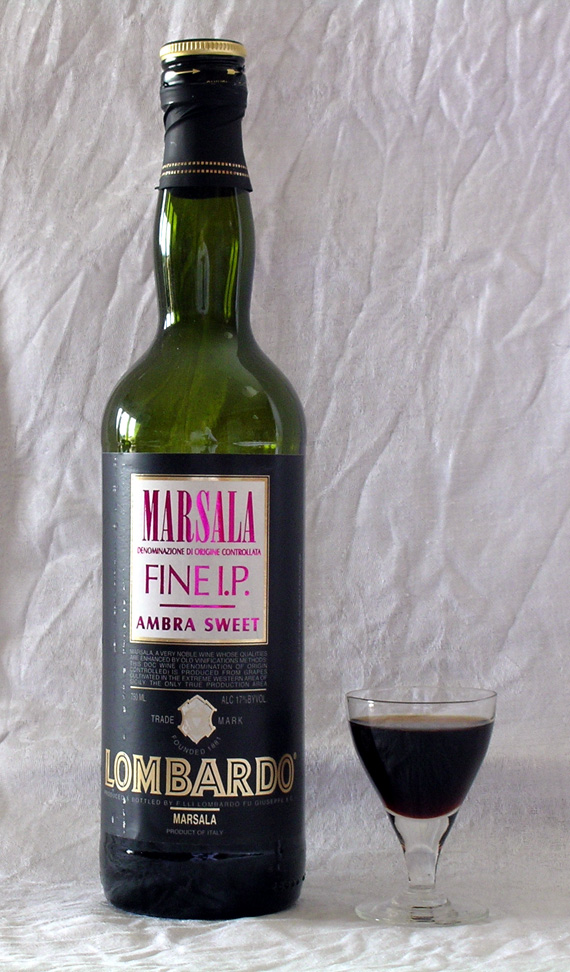
Marsala wine

Marsala is a fortified wine, dry or sweet, produced in the region surrounding the Italian city of Marsala in Sicily. Marsala first received Denominazione di Origine Controllata (DOC) status in 1969. The European Union grants Protected designation of origin (PDO) status to Marsala and most other countries limit the use of the term Marsala to products from the Marsala area.

While unfortified wine is also produced in the Marsala region, it does not qualify for the Marsala DOC.

== History ==
Marsala fortified wine was probably first popularized outside Sicily by the Liverpool merchant John Woodhouse. In 1773, he landed at the port of Marsala and discovered the local wine produced in the region, which was aged in wooden casks and tasted similar to Spanish and Portuguese fortified wines then popular in England. Fortified wine in Marsala has always been made using a process called in perpetuum, which is similar to the solera system used to produce Sherry in Jerez, Spain.

Woodhouse recognized that the in perpetuum process raised the alcohol level and alcoholic taste of this wine while also preserving these characteristics during long-distance sea travel. Woodhouse further believed that fortified Marsala would be popular in England. Marsala indeed proved so successful that Woodhouse returned to Sicily and, in 1796, began its mass production and commercialization. In 1806, it was Benjamin Ingham (1784–1861), arriving in Sicily from Leeds, who opened new markets for Marsala in Europe and the Americas. Founded by Benjamin Ingham and later run by Joseph Whitaker and William Ingham Whitaker. Joseph and his brother William Ingham Whitaker inherited vast vineyards and his great grandfather Ingham's banking empire.

In 1833, the entrepreneur Vincenzo Florio, a Calabrese by birth and Palermitano by adoption, bought up great swathes of land between the two largest established Marsala producers and set to making his own vintage with even more exclusive range of grape. Florio purchased Woodhouse's firm, among others, in the late nineteenth century and consolidated the Marsala wine industry. Florio and Pellegrino remain the leading producers of Marsala today.

== Characteristics and types ==
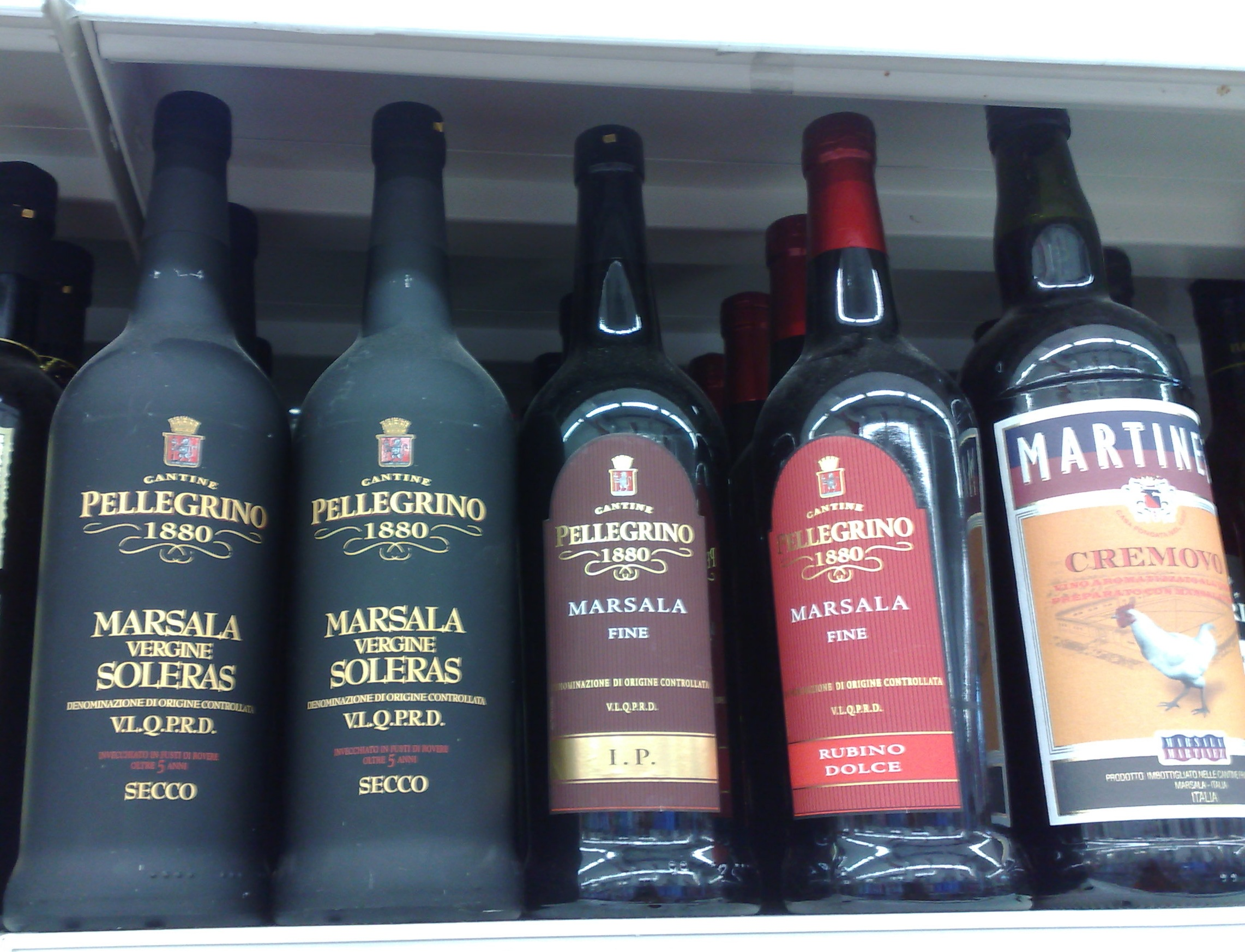
Different types of Marsala

Marsala is produced using the Grillo, Inzolia, Catarratto and Damaschino white grape varietals, among others.

Marsala contains about 15–20% alcohol by volume. Different Marsala wines are classified according to their color, sweetness, and duration of their ageing. The three levels of sweetness are secco (with a maximum of 40 grams of residual sugar per liter), semisecco (41–100 g/L), and sweet (over 100 g/L). The color and ageing classifications are as follows:

- Ambra has an amber colour. The coloring comes from the mosto cotto sweetener added to the wine
- Oro has a golden colour
- Rubino has a ruby colour, made from red grape varieties such as Perricone, Nero d'Avola and Nerello Mascalese
- Fine is aged at least one year
- Superiore is aged at least two years
- Superiore Riserva is aged at least four years
- Vergine and/or Soleras is aged at least five years
- Vergine and/or Soleras Stravecchio and Vergine and/or Soleras Riserva is aged at least ten years

Marsala wine was traditionally served as an aperitif between the first and second courses of a meal. Contemporary diners will serve its drier versions chilled with Parmesan (stravecchio), Gorgonzola, Roquefort, and other spicy cheeses, with fruits or pastries, and the sweeter at room temperature as a dessert wine. Marsala is sometimes discussed with another Sicilian wine, Passito di Pantelleria (Pantelleria Island's raisin wine).

== In cooking ==
Marsala wine is frequently used in cooking, and is especially prevalent in dishes served in Italian restaurants in the United States.

Dry Marsala wine is used in savory cooking. A typical savory Marsala sauce, for example, involves reducing the wine almost to a syrup with onions or shallots, then adding mushrooms and herbs. One of the most popular Marsala recipes is chicken marsala, in which flour-coated pounded chicken breast halves are braised in a mixture of Marsala, butter, olive oil, mushrooms, and spices. Marsala is also used in some risotto recipes.

Sweet Marsala wine is used to produce rich Italian desserts such as zabaione, tiramisu and shortcake.
