= Parrina =

Italian controlled wine origin region in Tuscany

Parrina is a small Italian Denominazione di Origine Controllata comprising parts of the commune of Orbetello in the province of Grosseto, Tuscany. The DOC was awarded in 1971, and extends to 110.33 hectares (272.6 acres) with about 20 wine producers, the largest of which, by far, is Antica Fattoria La Parrina. The DOC originally allowed only the use of Italian varieties such as Trebbiano, Sangiovese and Ansonica, but an amendment in 1986 recognised emerging trends in allowing the use of Chardonnay, Cabernet Sauvignon and Merlot. About 50% of the wine production is white, 35% red, and 15% rosato (rosé, or pink). The name "Parrina" may originate from the Castilian word for a pergola on which vines or figs are grown. Others argue the area took its name from the Parrini order which had a monastery here in the twelfth century (although the existence of such an order is hard to substantiate).

The small Parrina DOC is located entirely within the larger Ansonica Costa dell'Argentario DOC.

== DOC Regulations ==
According to regulations, Parrina bianco must be 30% to 50% Trebbiano Toscano (Procaino), 30% to 50% Ansonica (Inzolia) and/or Chardonnay, and 20% maximum of other white grapes. This blend permits the wine producer to use a much larger potential portion of Chardonnay, and therefore allows for a more structured and full wine than the typical Trebbiano-based DOC whites of Central Italy. As an example of this, the Italian producer Antica Fattoria La Parrina typically produces a Parrina bianco which is 50% Trebbiano, 30% Chardonnay and 20% Sauvignon Blanc.

Parrina Rosso is required to contain at least 70% Sangiovese, and is allowed to be released June 1 of the year succeeding the vintage.
