= Ansonica Costa dell'Argentario =

DOC wine from Tuscany, Italy

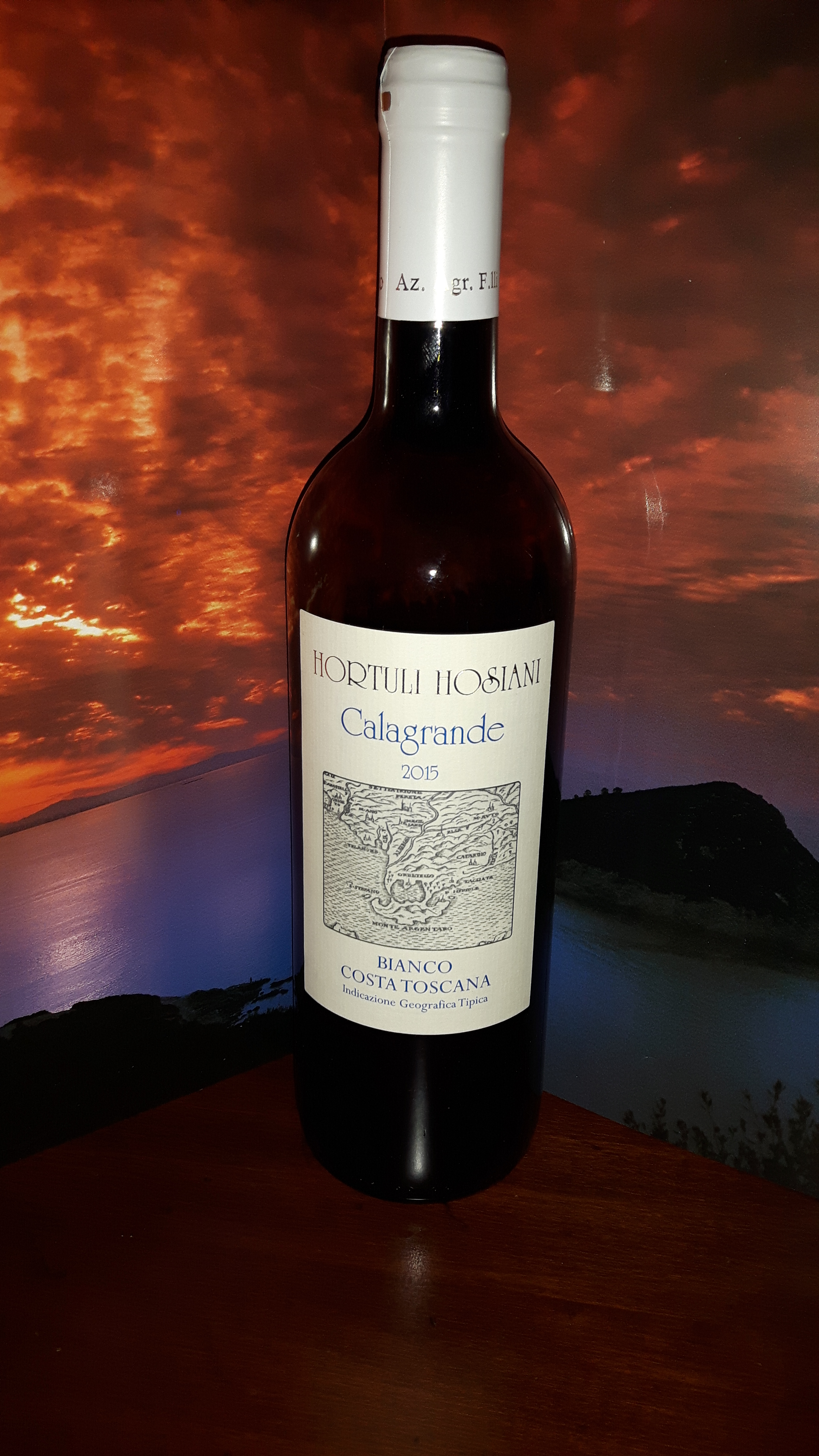
wine

Ansonica Costa dell'Argentario is a dry Italian white wine from the region of Tuscany, Italy. Ansonica is made from the Ansonica (Inzolia) grape. The DOC is located on the extreme southern coast of Tuscany and on the island of Giglio. The DOC was created in 1995, and allows for a minimum of 85% Ansonica and a 15% maximum of other white grapes in the blend.

To ripen properly, Ansonica requires specific microclimatic conditions, with intense sunshine, high temperatures, and little or no rainfall, especially during the growing season. The municipalities where the production of Ansonica Costa dell'Argentario DOC is permitted by the regulations are Manciano, Orbetello, Monte Argentario, Capalbio, and Isola del Giglio.
