= Pelaverga =

Variety of grape

- Grape (Vitis)
- Color of berry skin: Noir
- Species: Vitis vinifera
- Also called: See list of synonyms
- Origin: Italy
- VIVC number: 9101

Pelaverga is a red wine grape variety native to Piedmont. It is described as rare and pale, and lends itself to making lightly sparkling, strawberry-flavoured wines.

It may also be used as a table grape.

== Synonyms ==
Pelaverga is also known under a range of synonyms, among them: Caleura, Calora, Cari, Cario, Carola, Carolon, Peilaverga, Pela Verga, Uva Coussa, and Uva delle Zuche.
