= Grillo =

Variety of grape

- Grape (Vitis)
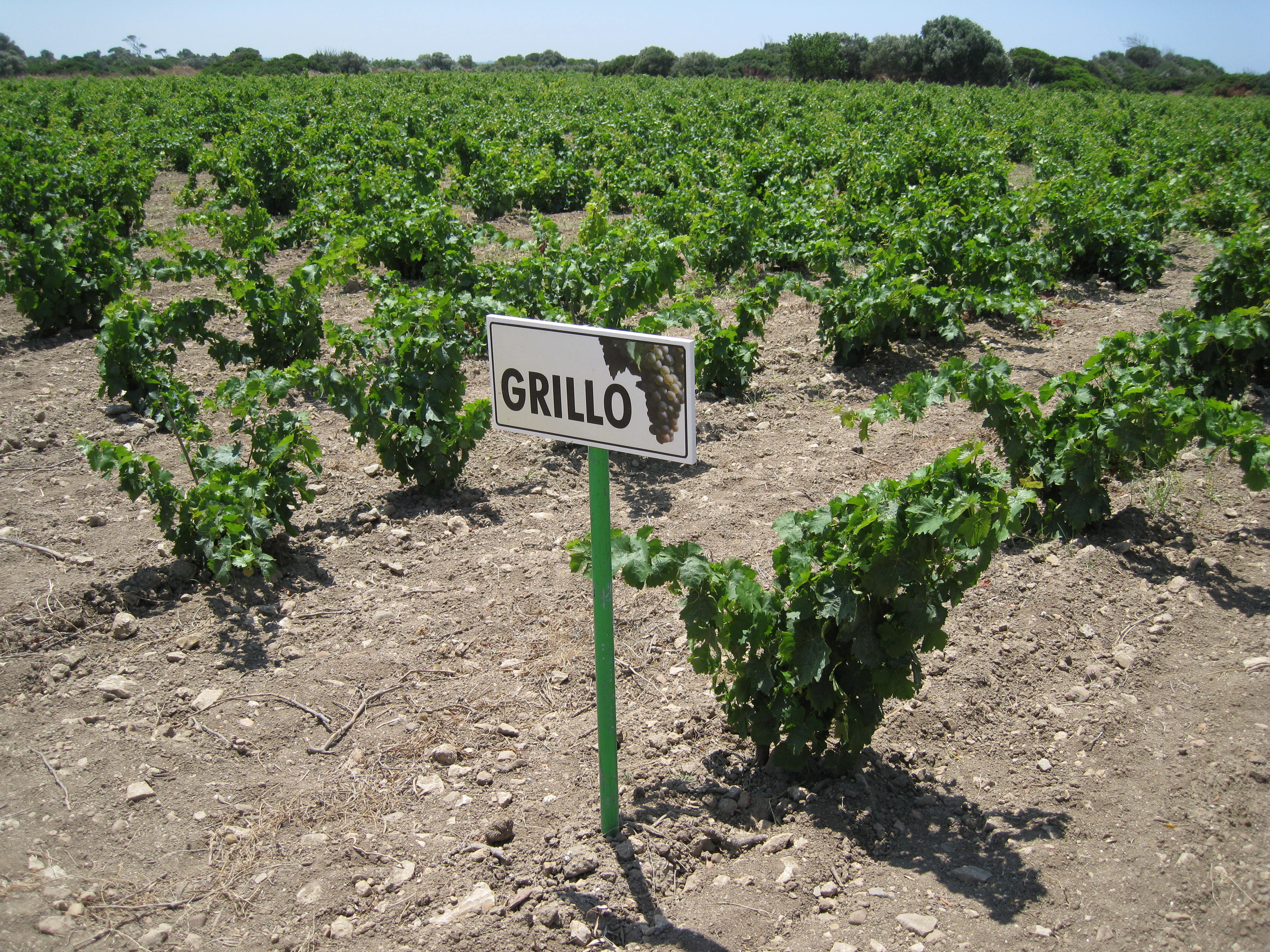
- Grillo grapes on the island of Motya
- Color of berry skin: White
- Species: Vitis vinifera
- Also called: Riddu, Rossese bianco
- Origin: Italy
- VIVC number: 5021

Grillo, also known as Riddu and Rossese bianco, is a white Italian wine grape variety that withstands high temperatures and is widely used in Sicilian winemaking and, in particular, for making Marsala. Its origins are uncertain, but it may have been introduced into the island of Sicily from Apulia. It was already widely planted in the Province of Trapani by 1897; today it may be grown throughout Sicily and also in the Aeolian Islands.

The grape also found growing around the commune of Riomaggiore in the province of La Spezia in Liguria, where it is known as Rossese bianco.

== Wine regions ==
Although this grape has had a long association with Marsala, in recent years it has become widely used in a number of DOC wines:

- Monreale (province of Palermo)
- Alcamo (provinces of Palermo and Trapani)
- Contea di Sclafani (provinces of Agrigento and Palermo)
- Delia Nivolelli (province of Trapani).

In 2023 Chris Hanna planted 1.21 acres at her Mountain View vineyard above the Dry Creek Valley. This the first planting of Grillo in California.

Although 100% Grillo IGT wines are also produced, blending with Chardonnay, for example, is also common.
