= Ansonica =

Variety of grape

- Grape (Vitis)
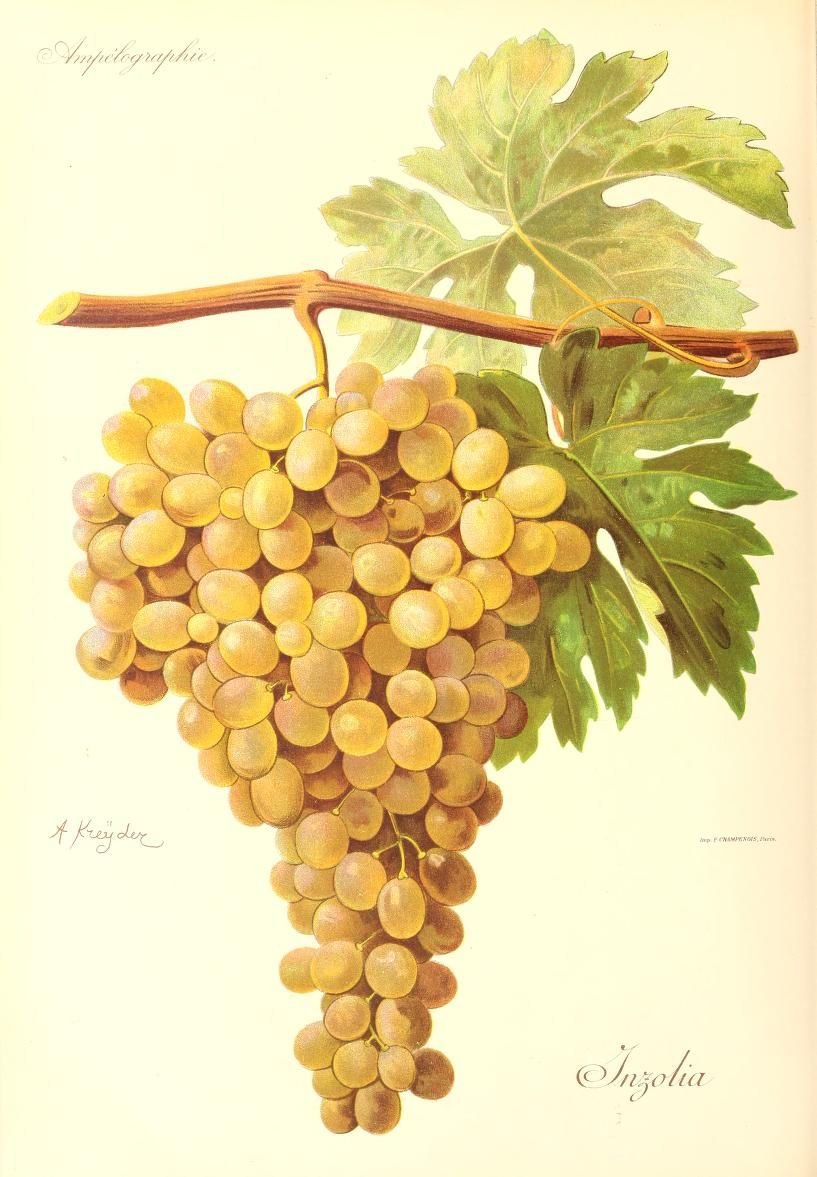
- Color of berry skin: Blanc
- Species: Vitis vinifera
- Also called: see list of synonyms
- Origin: Italy
- Notable regions: Sicily
- VIVC number: 492

Ansonica or Inzolia is a white Italian wine grape planted primarily in western Sicily where it can be used to produce Marsala wine. The grape is noted for its nutty aroma. In Tuscany, the grape is known as Ansonica. It is the chief (and potentially only) component of the Tuscan D.O.C. Ansonica Costa dell'Argentario, which is located on the extreme southern coast of Tuscany and on the island of Giglio.

Ansonica can also be found in the following DOC wines:

- Calabria: Bivongi DOC;
- Sicily: Alcamo DOC, Contea di Sclafani DOC, Contessa Entellina DOC, Delia Nivolelli DOC, Erice DOC, Memertino di Milazzo or Mamertino DOC, Marsala DOC, Menfi DOC, Monreale DOC, Riesi DOC, Salaparuta DOC, Sambuca di Sicilia DOC, Santa Margherita di Belice DOC, Sciacca DOC, Vittoria DOC;
- Tuscany: Ansonica Costa dell'Argentario DOC, Elba DOC, Parrina DOC and Val di Cornia DOC.

== Synonyms ==
Ansonica is also known under the synonyms Amsonica, Ansolia, Ansolica, Ansoliku, Ansonica Bianca, Ansora, Ansoria, Ansorica, Anzonaka, Anzonica, Anzulu, Arba Solika, Erba Insolika, Inselida, Insolia, Insolia di Palermo, Insora, Inzolia, Inzolia Parchitana, Nsolia, Nsuolia, Nzolia, Nzolia Bianca, Nzolia di Lipari, Nzolia di Palermo, Soria, and Zolia Bianca.
