= Humagne =

Humagne may refer to two wine grape varieties from the Valais region of Switzerland:

- Humagne Blanche ("white humagne"), white grape
- Humagne Rouge ("red humagne"), red grape a.k.a. Cornalin d'Aoste
