= Humagne Blanche =

Variety of grape

- Grape (Vitis)
- Color of berry skin: Blanc
- Species: Vitis vinifera
- Also called: Humagne, Humagne Blanc
- Origin: Switzerland
- Notable regions: Valais
- VIVC number: 5450

Humagne Blanche or Humagne is a white Swiss wine grape planted primarily in the Valais region. The total Swiss plantations of the variety in 2009 stood at 30 hectares (74 acres).

The grape produces a full bodied wine that is richer than Amigne and Petite Arvine, but more neutral in flavour than the latter.

DNA profiling at Changins in Switzerland and Aosta in Italy established that Humagne Blanche is not related to the red Swiss variety Humagne Rouge.
