= Moscato =

Moscato may refer to:

- Muscat (grape), a family of grapes used in wine-making
- Moscato d'Asti, an Italian sparkling wine
- Moscato Giallo, a variety of grape
- Moscato (surname), an Italian surname
- "Moscato", a song by Ab-Soul featuring Kendrick Lamar from the album Longterm Mentality (2011)
