= Muscat (grape) =

Variety of grape

- Grape (Vitis)
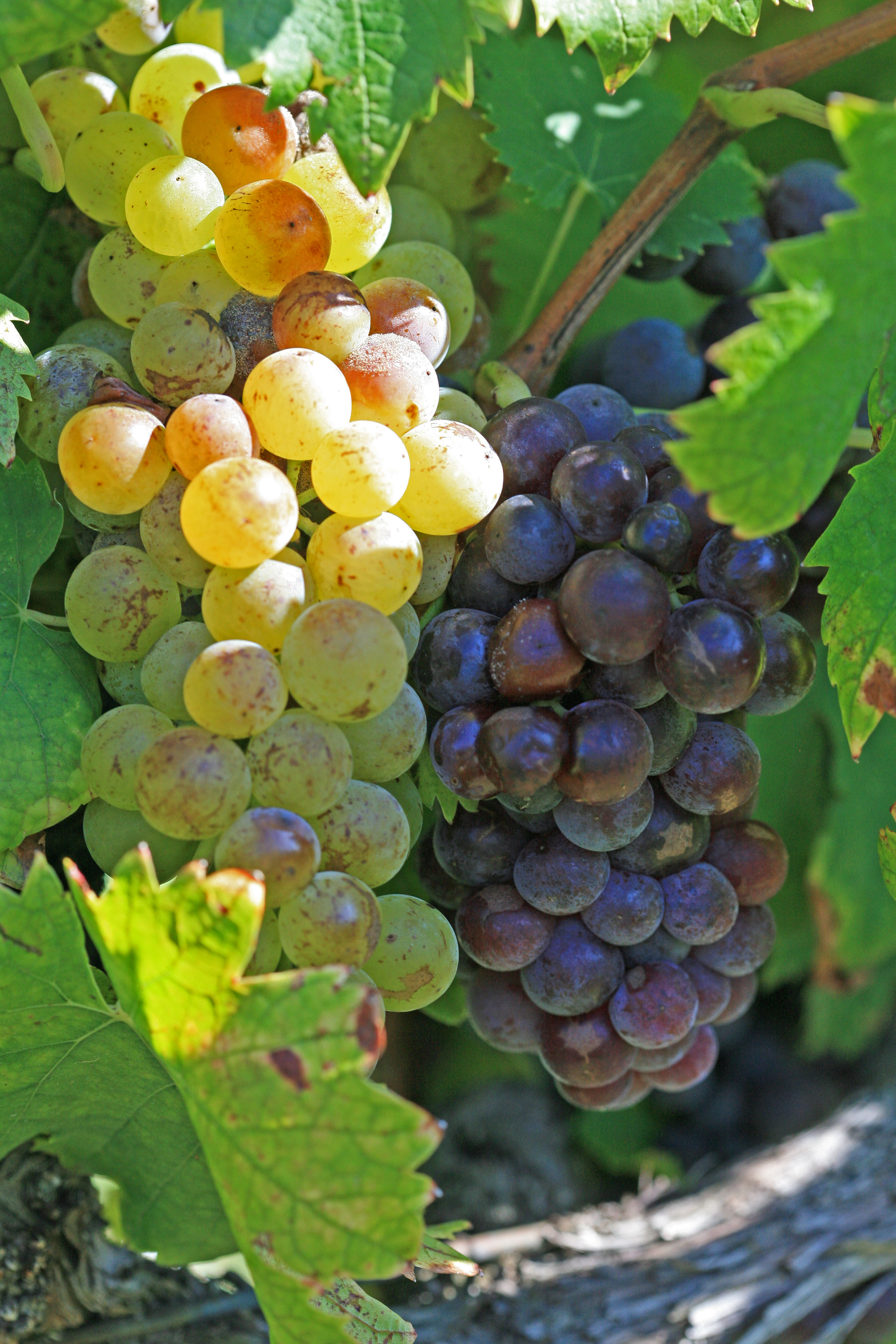
- Muscat Blanc à Petits Grains and Muscat Noir showing the white and black-skinned color mutation of the variety
- Species: Vitis vinifera

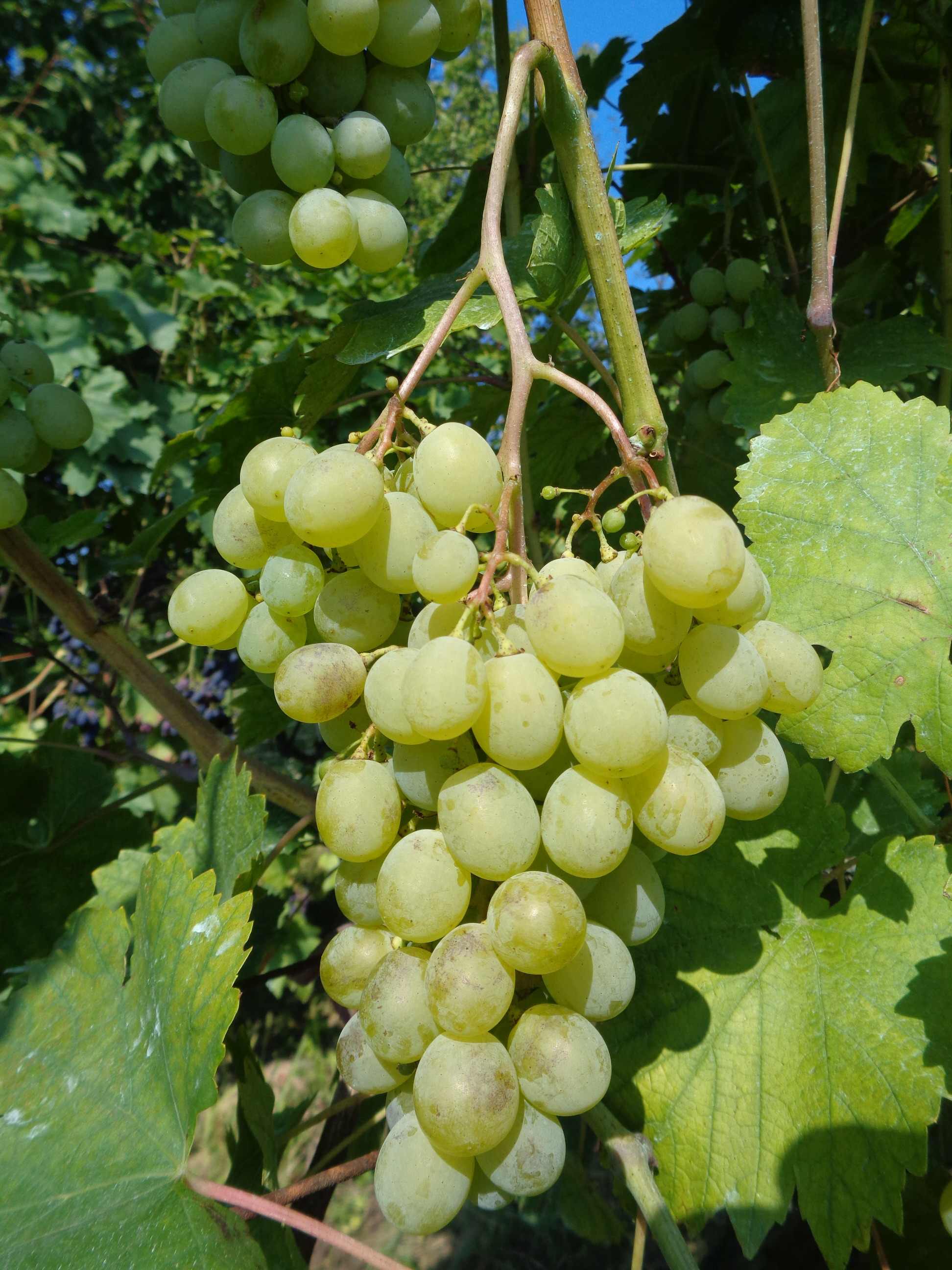
White Muscat – early ripening "July" variety

The Muscat family of grapes includes over 200 grape varieties belonging to the Vitis vinifera species that have been used in wine production and as raisin and table grapes around the globe for many centuries. Their colors range from white (such as Muscat Ottonel), to yellow (Moscato Giallo), to pink (Moscato Rosa del Trentino) to near black (Muscat Hamburg). Muscat grapes and wines almost always have a pronounced floral aroma. The breadth and number of varieties of Muscat suggest that it is perhaps the oldest domesticated grape variety, and there are theories that most families within the Vitis vinifera grape variety are descended from the Muscat variety.

Among the most notable members of the Muscat family are Muscat Blanc à Petits Grains, which is the primary grape variety used in the production of the Italian sparkling wine Asti (also known as Moscato d'Asti) made in the Piedmont region. It is also used in the production of many of the French fortified wines known as vin doux naturels. In Australia, this is also the main grape used in the production of Liqueur Muscat, from the Victorian wine region of Rutherglen. Young, unaged and unfortified examples of Muscat blanc tend to exhibit the characteristic Muscat "grapey" aroma as well as citrus, rose and peach notes. Fortified and aged examples (particularly those that have been barrel aged) tend to be very dark in color due to oxidation with aroma notes of coffee, fruit cake, raisins and toffee.

Muscat of Alexandria is another Muscat variety commonly used in the production of French vin doux naturel, but it is also found in Spain, where it is used to make many of the fortified Spanish Moscatels. Elsewhere it is used to make off-dry to sweet white wines, often labeled as Moscato in Australia, California and South Africa. In Alsace and parts of Central Europe, Muscat Ottonel is used to produce usually dry and highly perfumed wines.

== History ==
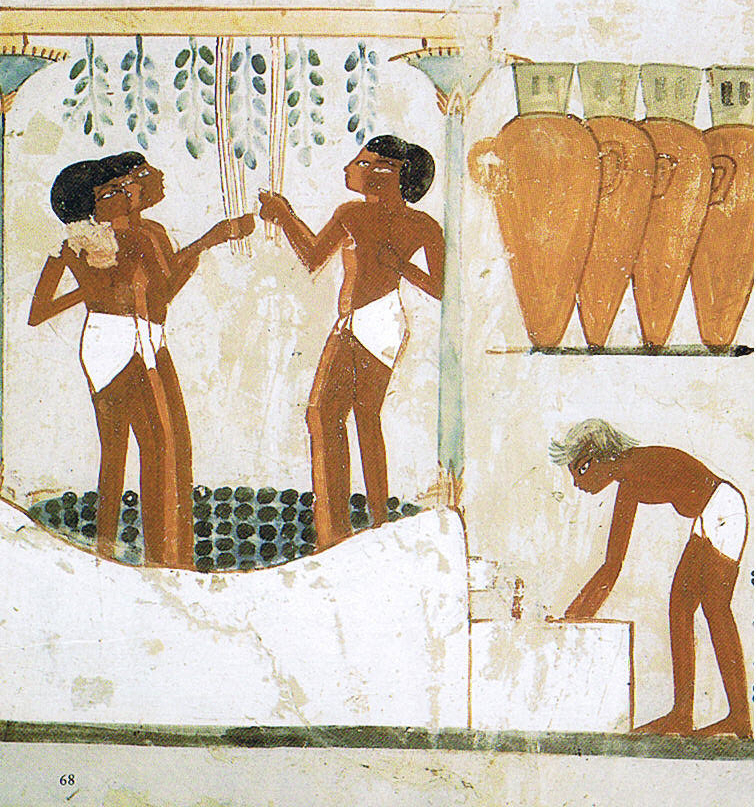
While there are theories that the origin of the Muscat family date back to ancient antiquity, there is no solid historical evidence that Muscat grapevines were among the grape varieties cultivated by civilizations such as the ancient Egyptians (papyrus image from the 15th-century BC tomb of Nakht).

Theories about the origins of Muscat grapes date ancestors of the varieties back to the ancient Egyptians and Persians of early antiquity (c. 3000–1000 BC) while some ampelographers, such as Pierre Galet, believe that the family of Muscat varieties were propagated during the period of classical antiquity (c. 800 BC to 600 AD) by the Greeks and Romans. However, while domestic wine production had a long history in ancient Egypt and Persia and classical writers such as Columella and Pliny the Elder did describe very "muscat-like" grape varieties such as Anathelicon Moschaton and Apianae that were very sweet and attractive to bees (Latin apis), there is no solid historical evidence that these early wine grapes were members of the Muscat family.

The first documented mention of grapes called "muscat" was in the works of the English Franciscan scholar Bartholomeus Anglicus who wrote of wine made from Muscat grapes in his work De proprietatibus rerum written between 1230 and 1240 while Anglicus was studying in what is now modern Saxony in Germany. Anglicus' Latin work was translated into French in 1372 with the wine being described by Anglicus as "vin extrait de raisins muscats".

== Origins of the name "Muscat" ==
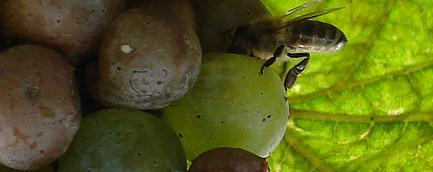
The "musky" aroma of ripe Muscat grapes has been known to attract bees (pictured), flies and other insects.

Because the exact origins of the Muscat family cannot be pinpointed, theories as to the origin of the name "Muscat" are numerous. The most commonly cited is that it is derived from the Persian word muchk. Similar etymology follows the Greek moskos, Latin muscus and French musc. In Italy, the Italian word mosca for fly could also be one possibility with the sweet aroma and high sugar levels of Muscat grapes attracting insects such as fruit flies.

Other theories suggest that the grape family originated in the West Asian country of Oman and was named after the city of Muscat located on the coast of the Gulf of Oman. Another city that is sometimes suggested as a potential birthplace/namesake is the Greek city of Moschato, located southwest of Athens in Attica, with Moschato being a common synonym in Greece for Muscat varieties.

== Closely related varieties ==
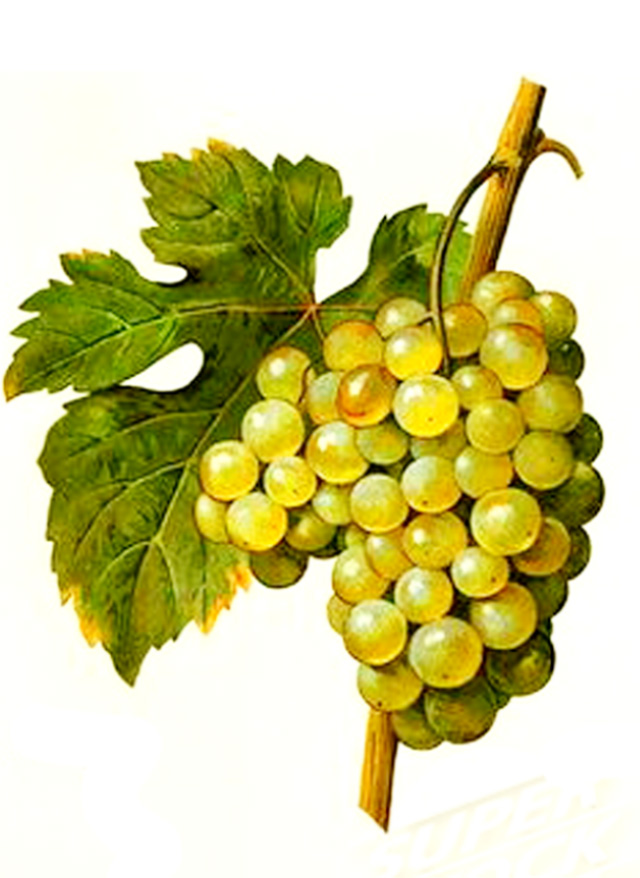
Muscat d'Eisenstadt (also known as "Muscat de Saumur"), one of the parent varieties of Muscat Ottonel

Of the more than 200 grape varieties sharing "Muscat" (or one of its synonyms) in their name, the majority are not closely related to each other. The exception are the members of the Muscat blanc à Petits Grains and Muscat of Alexandria families. In the early 21st century, DNA analysis showed that Muscat of Alexandria was, itself, a natural crossing of Muscat blanc à Petits Grains and a black-skinned table grape variety from the Greek islands known as Axina de Tres Bias. Rarely seen outside of Greece, Axina de Tres Bias (also known as "Heftakilo") is also grown in Malta and Sardinia.

Muscat blanc à Petits Grains and Muscat of Alexandria, themselves, have crossed and have produced at least 14 different grape varieties, 5 of which are mostly cultivated in South America and 9 still found in Italy though none are of major use in wine production. More notable and widely planted offspring have come from Muscat blanc à Petits Grains and Muscat of Alexandria crossing with other grape varieties, such as the Argentine wine grapes of Cereza, Torrontés Riojano and Torrontés Sanjuanino, stemming from a cross of Muscat of Alexandria with "Listán negro" (also known as the "Mission grape")

Muscat of Alexandria has also been crossed with the German / Italian wine grape Trollinger (also known as "Schiava Grossa") to produce Muscat of Hamburg and Malvasia del Lazio, and with the Italian wine grapes Catarratto bianco and Bombino bianco to produce the Marsala wine grape Grillo and Moscatello Selvatico, respectively. Muscat Ottonel is the result of a crossing between one Muscat variety, "Muscat d'Eisenstadt" (also known as "Muscat de Saumur"), with the Swiss wine grape Chasselas

Muscat blanc à Petits Grains has been identified as one of the parent grapes of several varieties, though with which crossing partner is currently unknown. These include the Italian wine grapes Aleatico, Moscato Giallo (Yellow Moscato), Moscato rosa del Trentino (Pink Moscato of Trentino) and Moscato di Scanzo. DNA analysis was able to identify the Tuscan wine grape Mammolo as the second parent variety that crossed with Muscat blanc à Petits Grains to produce Muscat rouge de Madère (Red Muscat of Madère).

== Characteristic aromas and confusion with other grapes ==
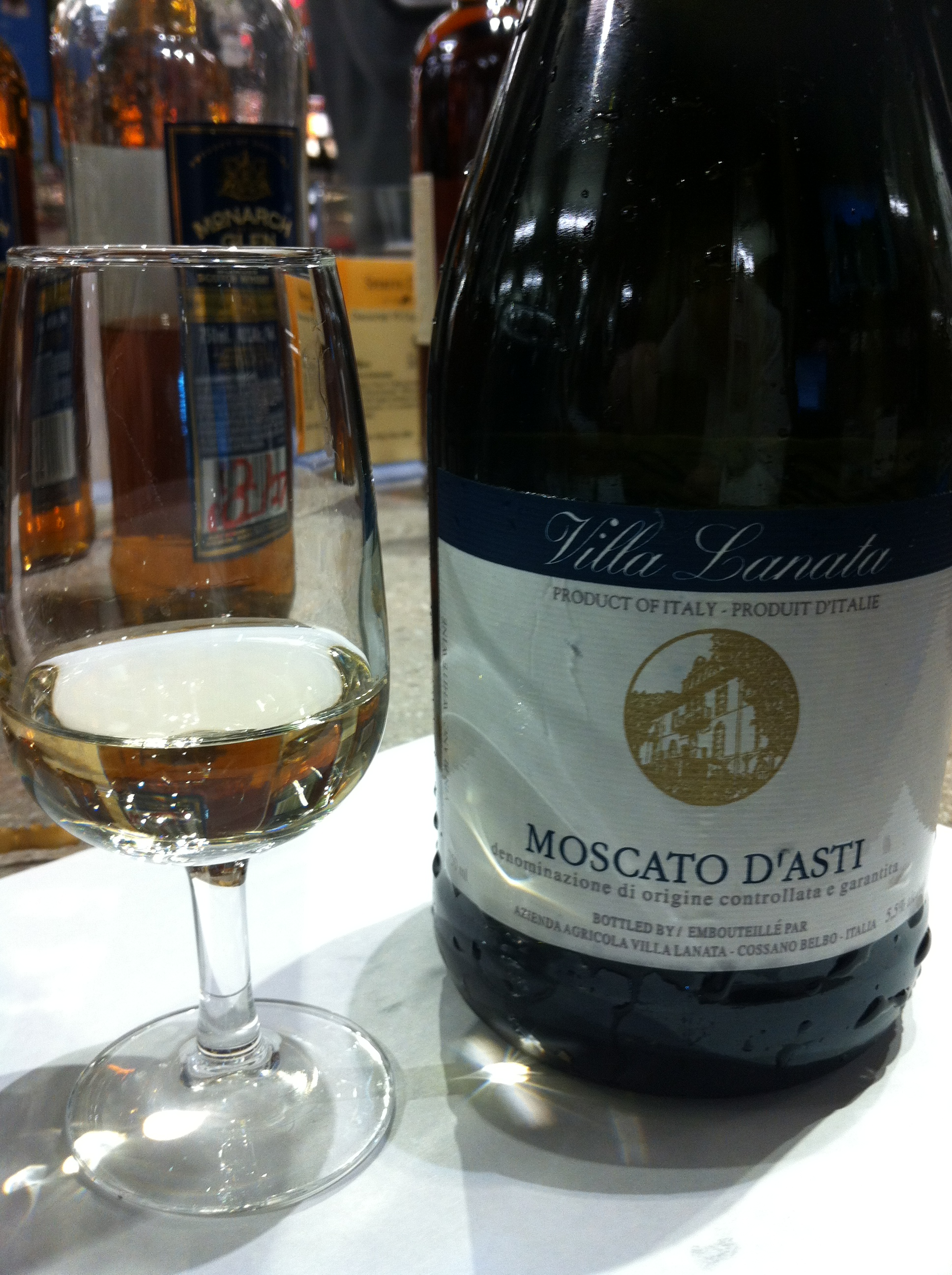
The characteristic floral, "grapey" aroma of Muscat can be seen in wines such as Moscato d'Asti, made in a winemaking style that emphasizes the varietal aromas of the grape, rather than aromas derived from winemaking processes like oak aging or autolysis on the lees.

Despite the vast diversity in the Muscat family, one common trait that can be seen in almost all Muscat members is the characteristic floral, "grapey" aroma note that is caused by the high concentration of monoterpenes in the grapes. More than 40 different monoterpenes have been discovered in Muscat grapes (as well as in other aromatic varieties like Riesling and Gewürztraminer); these include citronellol, geraniol, linalool and nerol. This characteristic "musk" aroma can be best observed in light bodied, low alcohol wines such as Moscato Asti which have not had their bouquet heavily influenced by other winemaking techniques like oak aging, autolysis with yeast, malolactic fermentation or fortification.

However, this common "musky" (French: musqué) trait has caused some confusion as varieties that are wholly unrelated to the Muscat family are often erroneously associated with Muscat grapes (often by naming and synonyms) due to their aromatic character. These include the German wine grape Morio Muskat which, despite its name, is not related to the Muscat family and is, instead, a crossing of Silvaner x Pinot blanc. Likewise, the highly aromatic clonal mutation of several wine grape varieties such as Sauvignon blanc, Chasselas and Chardonnay are often suffixed with Musqué which can add confusion to their relationship with the Muscat family. Additionally, the Bordeaux wine grape Muscadelle that is used for both sweet and dry wines is often mistaken for a Muscat variety due to its aromatic qualities. While made from a more aromatically neutral grape, Melon de Bourgogne grape, the Loire wine Muscadet is sometimes mistakenly believed to be made from a member of the Muscat family.

Lastly, the Muscat grape can be confused (in name only; the grapes themselves are quite different) with Vitis rotundifolia, which is commonly known as a "muscadine" grape.

== Key varieties ==
The "Muscat family" is highly populous, with more than 200 distinct members. However, among these many different grapes only a handful of Muscat varieties are widely used in wine production. These include Muscat blanc à Petits Grains, Muscat of Alexandria, Muscat of Hamburg and Muscat Ottonel.

=== Muscat blanc à Petits Grains ===
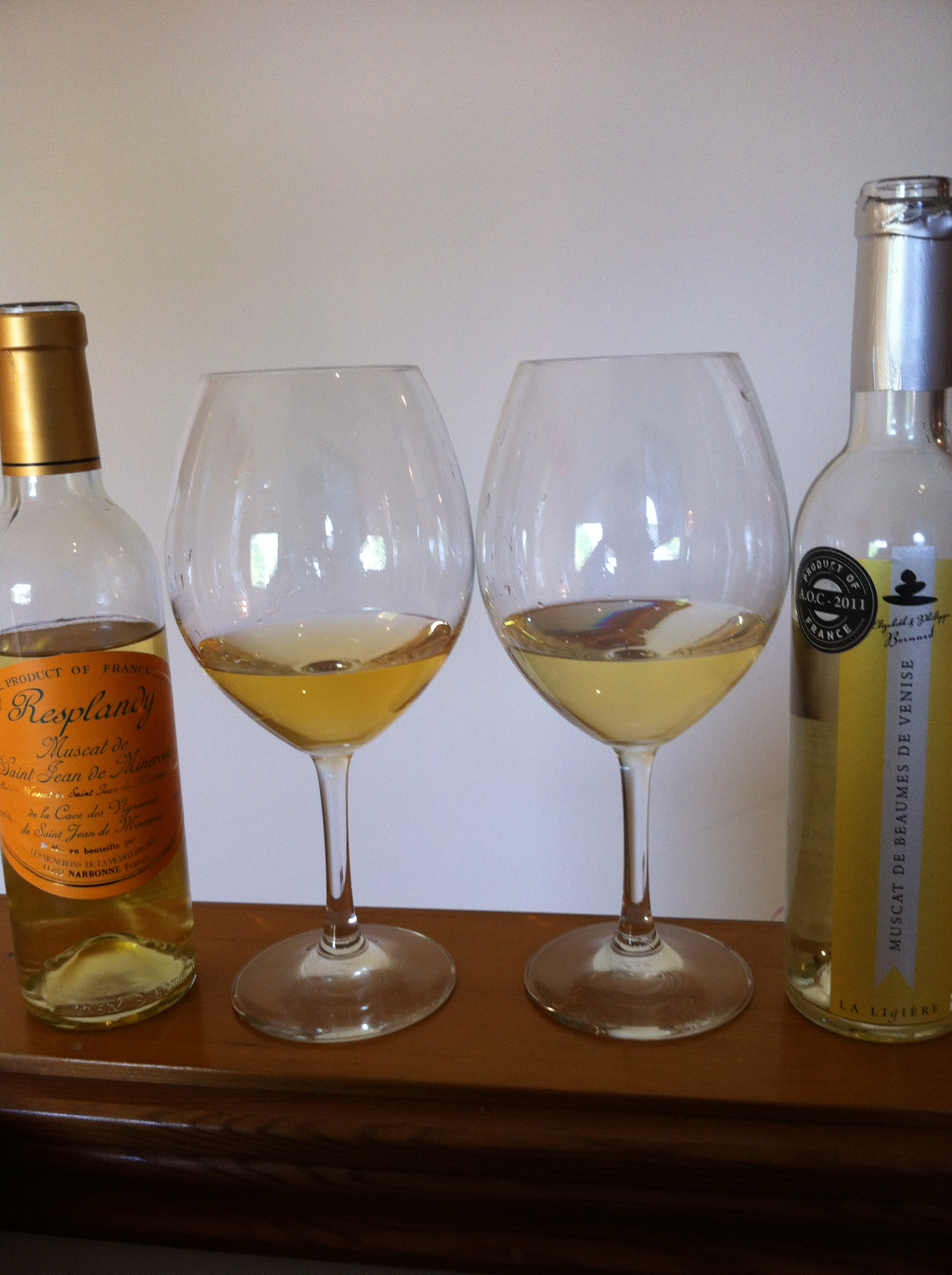
In France, Muscat blanc à Petits Grains is often used to produce fortified "Vin doux Naturel" dessert wines such as the Muscat de Saint-Jean de Minervois (left) and Muscat de Beaume de Venise (right) shown.

Muscat blanc à Petits Grains is known by many names worldwide, including Muscat Blanc (white Muscat) in France and the United States), Muscat Canelli in the United States, Moscato Bianco (white Moscato) in Italy, Muscat Frontignan in South Africa, Moschato in Greece, Brown Muscat in Australia, Muskateller in Germany and Austria, Muscat de Grano Menudo in Spain, and Muscat de Frontignan and Muscat Lunel in France. While the "petits grains" in the grape's name accurately describes the small, round berries of the vine, some wine experts, such as Oz Clarke, believe that the term "Muscat blanc" is misleading, since the grapevine is notorious for its frequent color mutations siring clusters of berries in nearly every shade possible though most commonly the grape berries are a deep yellow after veraison. In some vineyards, vines of Muscat blanc à Petits Grains are known to produce clusters of berries of different colors that change every vintage.

The precise origins of Muscat blanc à Petits Grains are not known, though Greece and Italy can both make compelling cases due to the proliferation of clones, mutations and offspring. Today, the grape is found throughout the wine-producing world, making a wide range of wine, from light, sweet sparkling and semi-sparkling Asti and Moscato d'Asti wine in the Piedmont wine region of Italy and Clairette de Die region of France, fortified vin doux naturels (VdN) in southern France in AOC regions such as Muscat de Beaume de Venise, Muscat de Saint-Jean de Minervois and Muscat de Frontignan, fortified Liqueur Muscat in the Rutherglen wine region in Australia, to dry wines in the Wachau wine of Austria and Südsteiermark.

Nearly all the most notable sweet Muscats of Greece, particularly those from the island of Samos and the city of Patras on the Peloponnese are made from Muscat blanc à Petits Grains. In the history of South African wine, the famous dessert wine of Constantia was made from this variety of Muscat and while today Muscat of Alexandria is more widely planted in South Africa, producers around Constantia are trying to reclaim some of the region's viticultural acclaim by replanting more Muscat blanc à Petits Grains and making wines in the style of the original Constantia.

=== Muscat of Alexandria ===
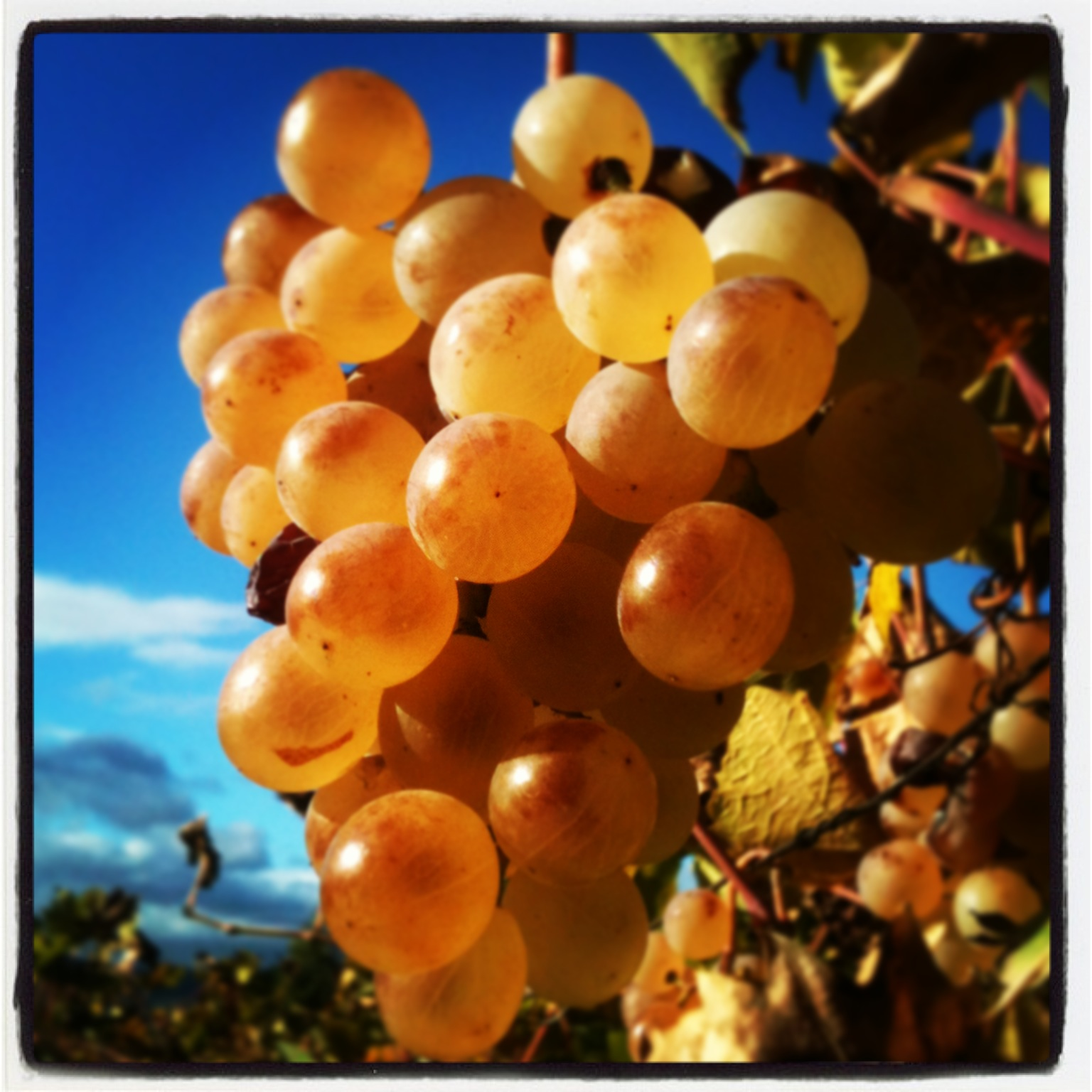
The berries of Muscat of Alexandria clusters are larger and more oval-shaped than those of Muscat blanc à Petits Grains.

While the grape's name harkens to the city of Alexandria and suggest an ancient Egyptian origin, DNA analysis has shown that Muscat of Alexandria is the result of a natural crossing between Muscat blanc à Petits Grains and the Greek wine grape Axina de Tres Bias. Though as Axina de Tres Bias has also been historically grown in Sardinia and Malta, the precise location and origins of Muscat of Alexandria cannot be determined. Compared to Muscat blanc à Petits Grains, Muscat of Alexandria tends to produce large, moderately loose clusters of large oval-shaped berries that are distinctive from the much smaller, round berries of Muscat blanc à Petits Grains.

Like most Muscat varieties, Muscat of Alexandria is notable for being a desirable raisin and table grape. This is due in part to the grape's high tolerance of heat and drought conditions. While it is used in wine production (most notably on the island of Pantelleria between Sicily and Tunisia, where it makes a passito style dessert wine under the name of "Zibibbo"), the grape lags far behind the reputation of Muscat blanc à Petits Grains. This is partly because Muscat of Alexandria is very vigorous and prone to produce high yields that can be easily overcropped as well as a more assertive aroma profile due to a higher concentration of the monoterpene geraniol, which produces a geranium scent, and lower concentration of nerol with a more fresh, sweet rose aroma.

In France, Muscat of Alexandria is most prominent as a blending component (with Muscat blanc à Petits Grains) in the VdN wines of Muscat de Rivesaltes AOC in the Roussillon wine region. The grape is the primary Muscat variety in Spain, where it is known as Moscatel, though the majority of the country's plantings are used for table grapes and raisins, rather than for wine production. Likewise, in Chile, and Peru most of the Moscatel in both countries is used to produce the distilled drink "pisco".

In South Africa, Muscat of Alexandria is known as "Hanepoot" and was the fourth-most widely planted white wine grape variety in the country until the early 2000s. While some of the plantings were used for wine production, particularly for fortified wine, many plantings were used for the production of grape concentrate and raisins. In California, there is still more plantings of Muscat of Alexandria than any other Muscat variety, with most of these grapes going into anonymous jug wines from the Central Valley. As in many other places in the world, the grape had a long history of use in the United States as a raisin variety, though in the 1920s, plantings of Muscat of Alexandria began to decline as producers turned to more popular seedless grape varieties.

=== Muscat of Hamburg ===
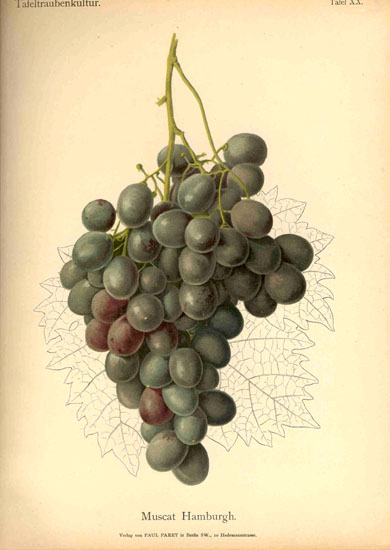
Muscat of Hamburg from an 1895 German viticultural text

Even though the vast majority of the members of the Muscat family are dark skinned grapes, most of the major varieties used in wine production are white or "pale skinned", with the one significant exception of Muscat of Hamburg, which is also known as Black Muscat. This dark-skinned grape is believed to have originated in the Victorian greenhouses of England, where it was first described in 1858 as being propagated by Seward Snow, gardener to the Earl de Grey. Snow described the grape as a seedling that he created from crossing the Black Hamburg grape (an old synonym of Schiava Grossa) with the White Muscat of Alexandria. In 2003, DNA analysis confirmed that Muscat of Hamburg was, indeed, a crossing of Muscat of Alexandria and Schiava Grossa, which makes the grape a full sibling to the central Italian grape Malvasia del Lazio which has the same parentage.

While Muscat of Hamburg is used mostly as a table grape throughout the world, there are two notable exceptions. The first is in California, where nearly all of the 102 hectares (250 acres) of Black Muscat in cultivation in 2009 were destined for wine production, primarily to produce dessert wines. The other exception is in China, where Muscat of Hamburg is often crossed with Vitis amurensis species that are native to the region to produce wine grapes that are better adapted to the climate of various Chinese wine regions.

=== Muscat Ottonel ===
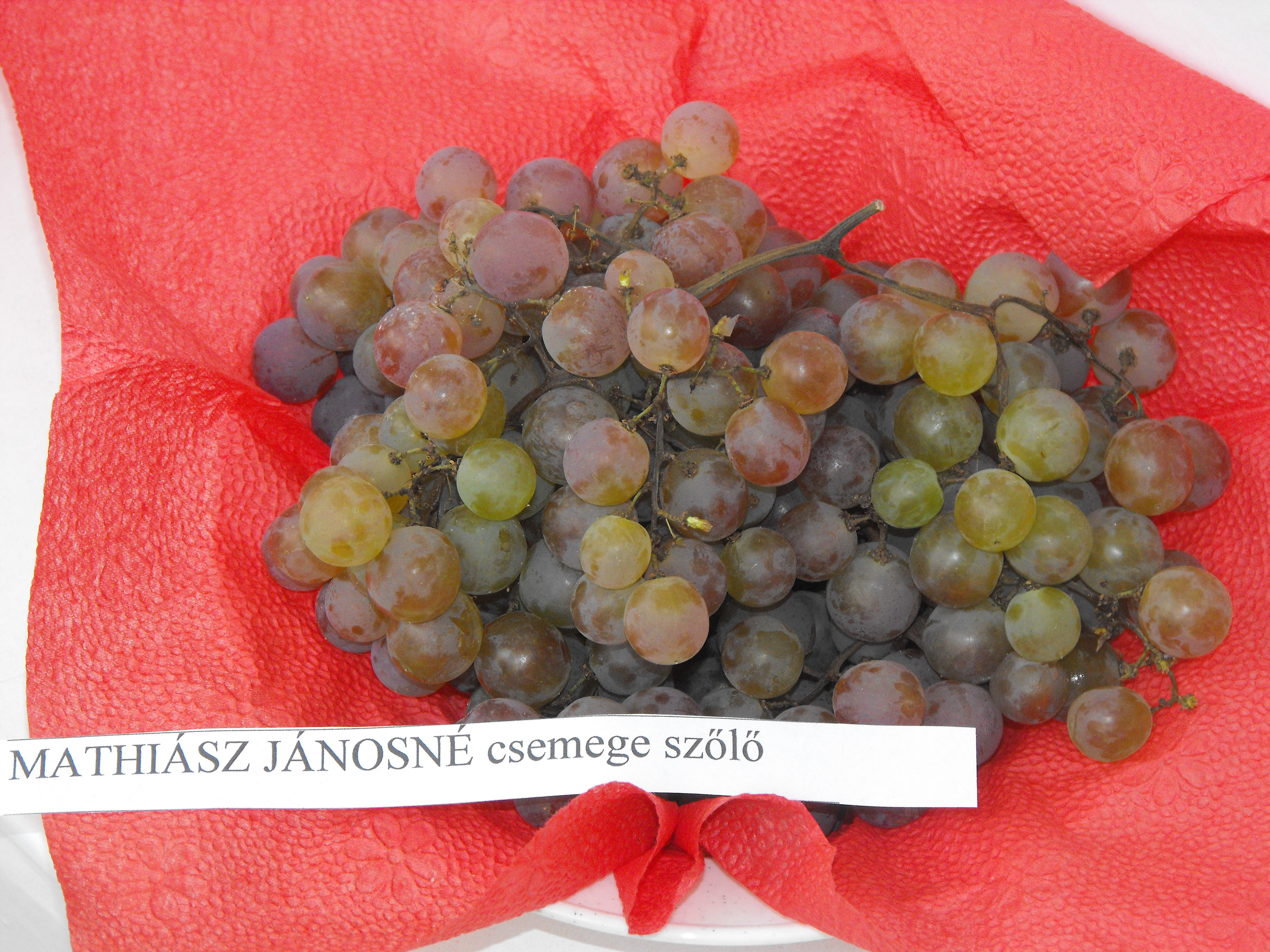
A bowl of table grapes that includes a mixture of Muscat Ottonel and Chasselas Rouge de Foncé

Like Muscat of Hamburg, Muscat Ottonel is a relatively recent addition to the Muscat family, being bred in the Loire Valley wine region of France in the 1850s. The grape is a cross of the Swiss wine grape Chasselas and Muscat d'Eisenstadt (also known as Muscat de Saumur). Of all of the major Muscat varieties, Muscat Ottonel has the most pale skin color, and tends to produce the most neutral wines and is also the grape variety that ripens the earliest.

While varieties such as Muscat of Alexandria tend to thrive in very warm Mediterranean climates, Muscat of Ottonel has shown an affinity for ripening in cooler continental climates, and has found a home in many Central European nations, such as Bulgaria, the Czech Republic, Romania and many former republics of the Soviet Union, such as Russia, Kazakhstan, Moldova, Tajikistan, Turkmenistan and Ukraine. It is also the primary Muscat variety grown in the French region of Alsace, where it is used to produce both dry and off-dry styles. In Austria, it is also the most widely planted Muscat variety, where it is used to produce late-harvest wines around Lake Neusiedl.

== Other notable varieties ==
- Muscat of Bornova
- Canada Muscat
- Early Muscat
- Golden Muscat
- Manzoni Moscato
- Moscatello Selvatico
- Moscato di Scanzo
- Moscato di Terracina
- Moscato Giallo (Yellow Moscato)
- Moscato rosa del Trentino (Pink Moscato of Trentino)
- Muscat Bailey A
- Muscat bleu (Blue Muscat)
- Muscat d'Eisenstadt
- Muscat Fleur d'Oranger
- Muscat Odessky
- Muscat of Norway
- Muscat Oliver
- Muscat Rose à Petits Grains
- Muscat Rouge à Petits Grains
- Muscat Swenson
- Muškát moravský
- New York Muscat
- Riesling Muscat
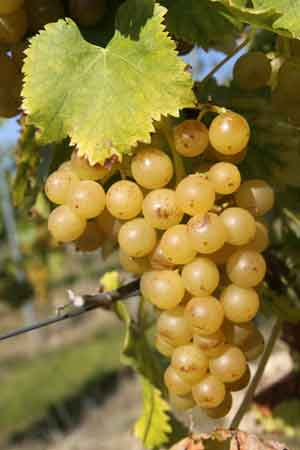
Moscato Giallo (Yellow Moscato)

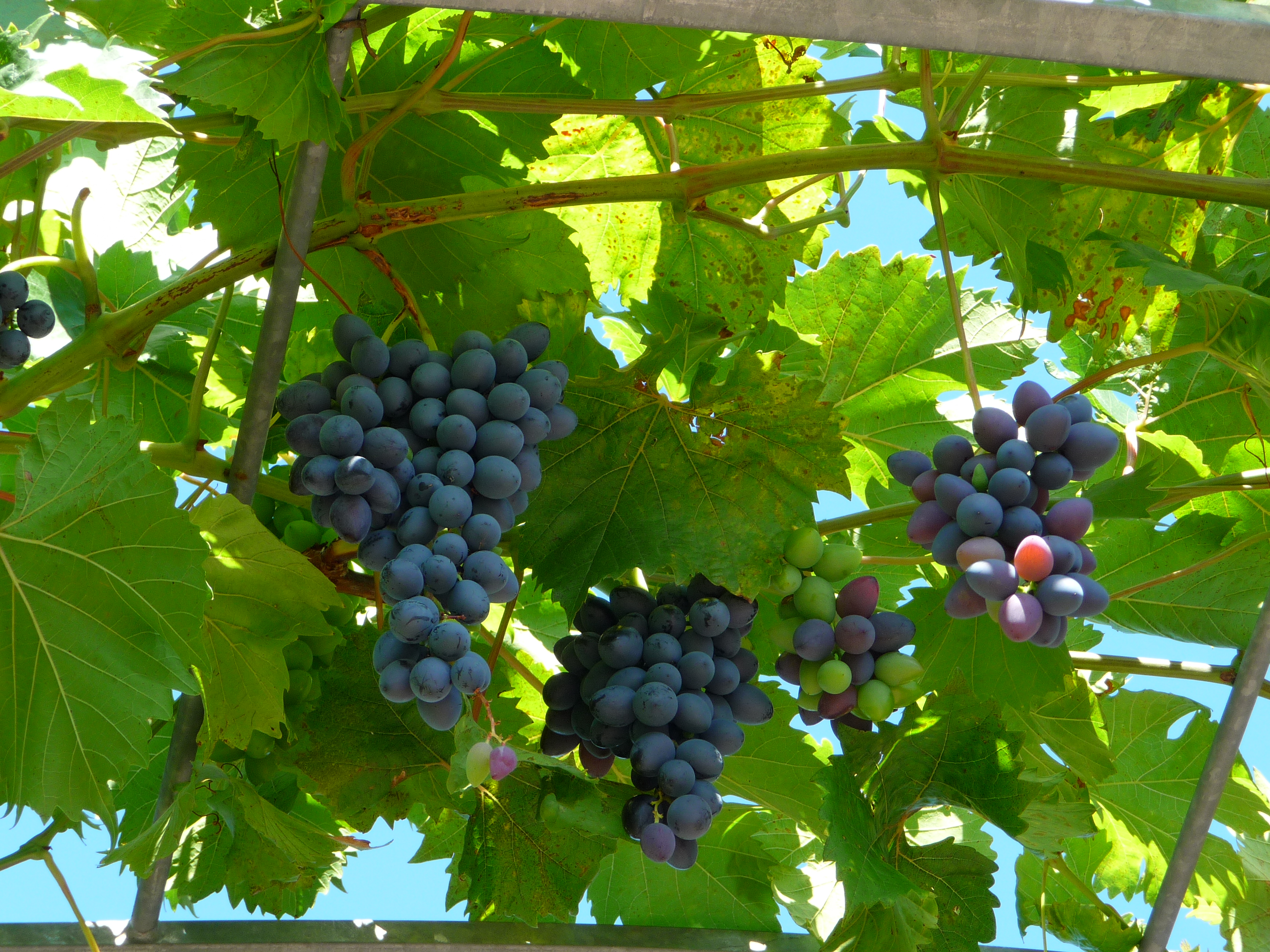
Muscat bleu (Blue Muscat)

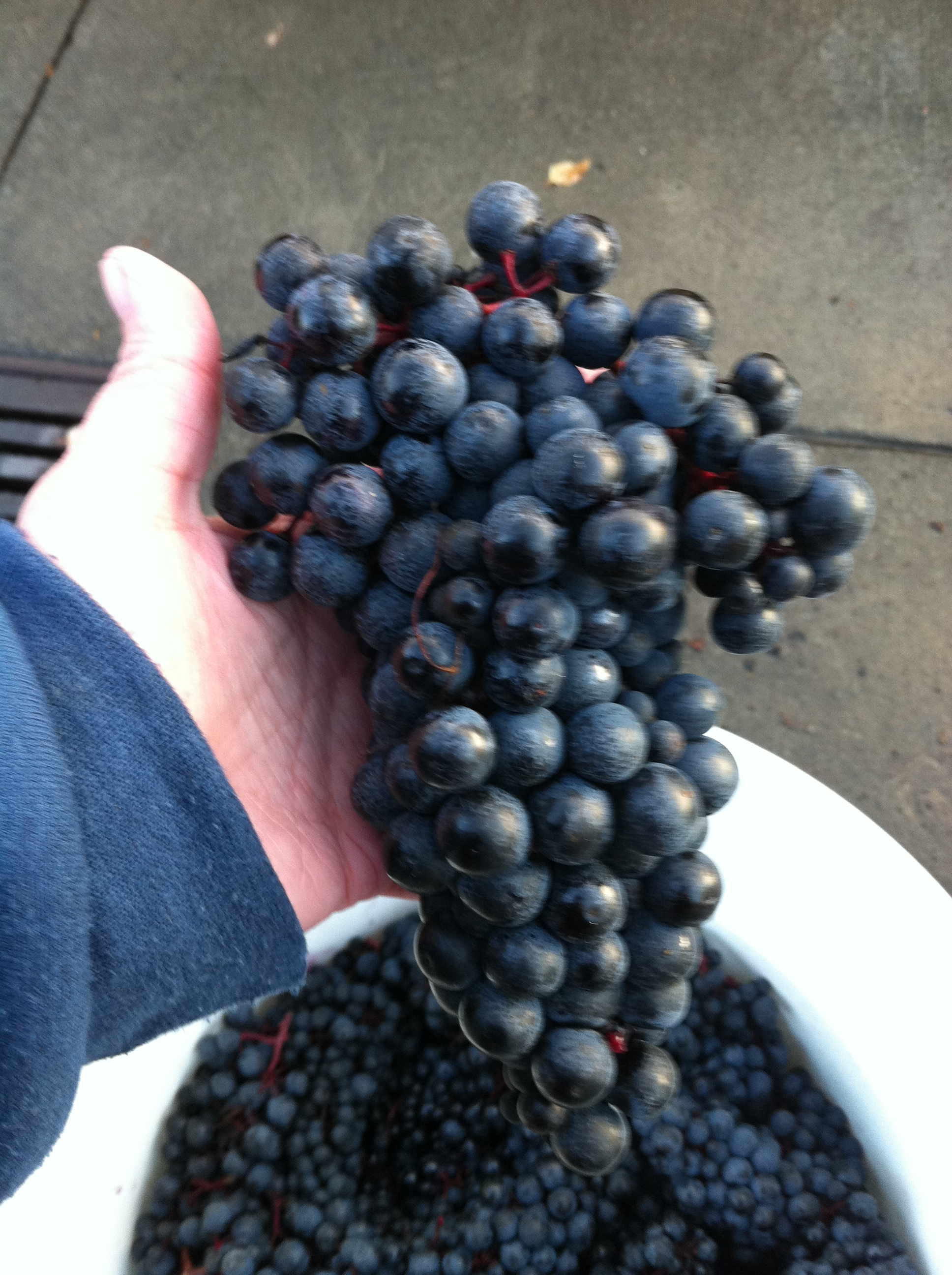
Muscat of Norway

== Synonyms ==
While each individual Muscat variety has its own set of synonyms, the general prefix of "Muscat" has its own unique translation around the globe. In Greece, the grapes are usually known as "Moschato" or "Moschoudia", while in Italy, they are known as "Moscato" or "Moscatello". On the Iberian peninsula, Portuguese and Spanish Muscat grapes are often prefixed as "Moscatel", while in Germany, the grapes are usually known as "Muskat" or "Muskateller". The family of Muscat varieties are known as "Misket" in Bulgaria and Turkey, "Muškat" in Croatia, and "Muskotály" in Hungary. In the wine regions of Tunisia, the grapes are often known as "Meski".

== See also ==
- International variety
- Shine Muscat
