= Ticino (wine region) =

Wine region of Switzerland

- Wine region
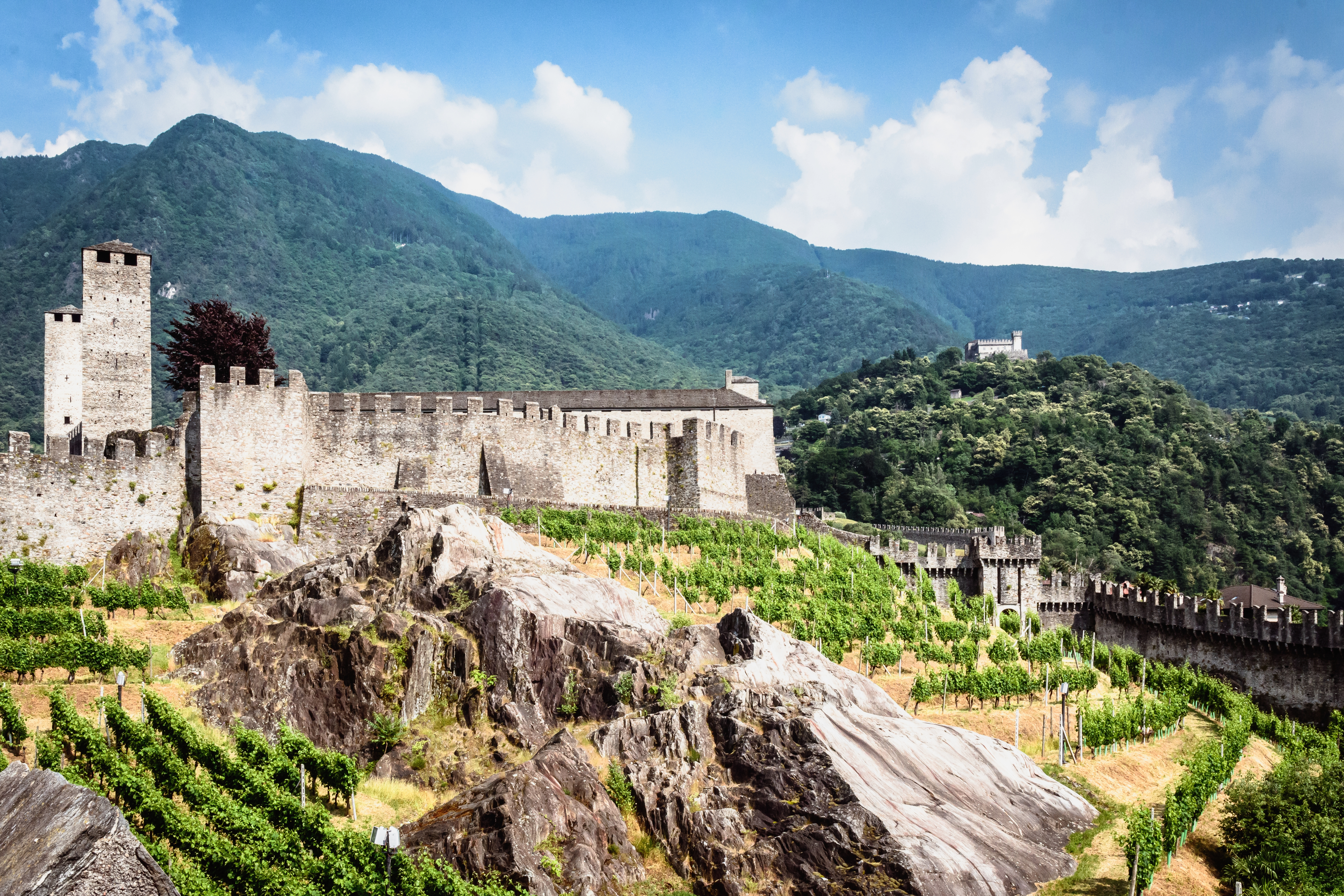
- Vineyards at Bellinzona Castles
- Official name: Ticino
- Other names: Svizzera Italiana
- Type: DOC (AOC)
- Year established: in the Roman era
- Years of wine industry: VITI: since 1948; DOC: since 1997;
- Part of: Swiss wines
- Precipitation (annual average): 1500–2200 mm
- Size of planted vineyards: 1,040 ha
- No. of vineyards: 3,869
- Grapes produced: 6'816'620 Kg
- Varietals produced: Merlot (and Bondola)
- No. of wineries: 264
- Official designation(s): DOC, VITI
- Comments: All data as of 2005

Ticino has a long tradition of winemaking, being the southernmost region of Switzerland. Wine has been produced there since the Roman era. The region is known for its Merlot, which was introduced in the early 20th century. Bianchi di Merlot, produced from red merlot grapes by minimizing skin contact during vinification, is a distinctive style characteristic of the region.

Geographically the wine region is located on the south side of the Alps and includes the canton of Ticino and the neighbouring district of Moesa (Misox and Calanca valleys) in the canton of the Grisons, both areas being Italian-speaking. It is the warmest region of the country, olive oil is also produced there.

The terroir varies from acid soil in the northern part to limestone in the southern part.

The top quality wines of the region have the appellation del Ticino DOC or ticinese DOC, sometimes linked with a VITI label, and the wines in the medium category use della Svizzera Italiana or nostrano.

== History ==
=== Until 1906 ===
The first traces of grapes in Ticino are some pollens in sediments, starting from the Neolithic. Notable diffusion of grapes by humans probably dates from the late Bronze Age to the entire Iron Age, and the grapes were probably located near the lakes. At the beginning of the Roman era there was already substantial cultivation of grapes, and production of wine probably started in this period, as shown in a sculpture on a Roman tomb found in Stabio.

Until the 18th century, grapes were grown as a secondary product in extensive vineyards, from which light wines were produced, using a form of sharecropping. The wine was produced in some local varieties, of which only Bondola survived. They were mainly red wines, but some were mixtures of red varieties with some white varieties.

=== The 20th century: the Merlot era ===
Because of new grapes diseases (e.g. phylloxera), the canton government decided to give a new direction to the wine industry: they instituted the cattedra itinerante (moving chair) to teach modern viticulture and winemaking methods, and to substitute new high-value grapes for the local grapes. After a few years of studies and selections, in 1906 the canton decided to seed and recommended Merlot as the main variety of grapes for the canton.

Another change was the operation of the railway of Gotthardbahn, which increased the commerce between Italy and the Swiss-German (and also German) market. This commerce has created new wineries, which mainly started with bottling of Italian wines, but then switched the focus to production of local wines.

In the Sopraceneri region of northern Ticino, the local variety Bondola still survives in some vineyards and is used to produce some wine.

=== Late 20th and 21st centuries ===
In the late 20th century, the wineries looked for quality wines, and because of new world wines, the demand of Merlot wine increased. Thus a golden era of wines of Ticino began. Unfortunately, in the first years of the 2000s there was overproduction, so now the TicinoWine (association of wineries in Ticino) tries to find and target new markets for the local wine.

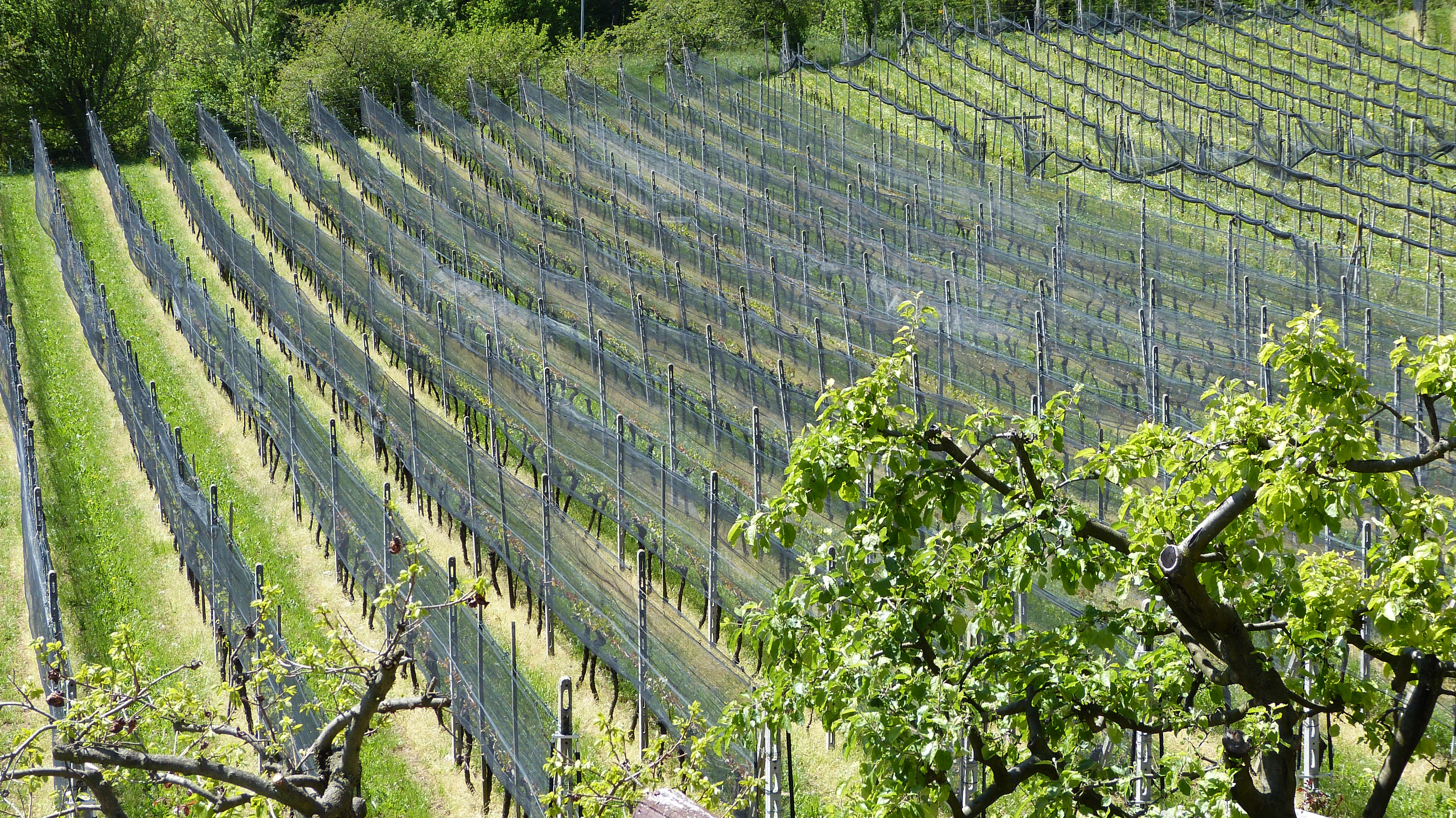
Vineyards in Meride

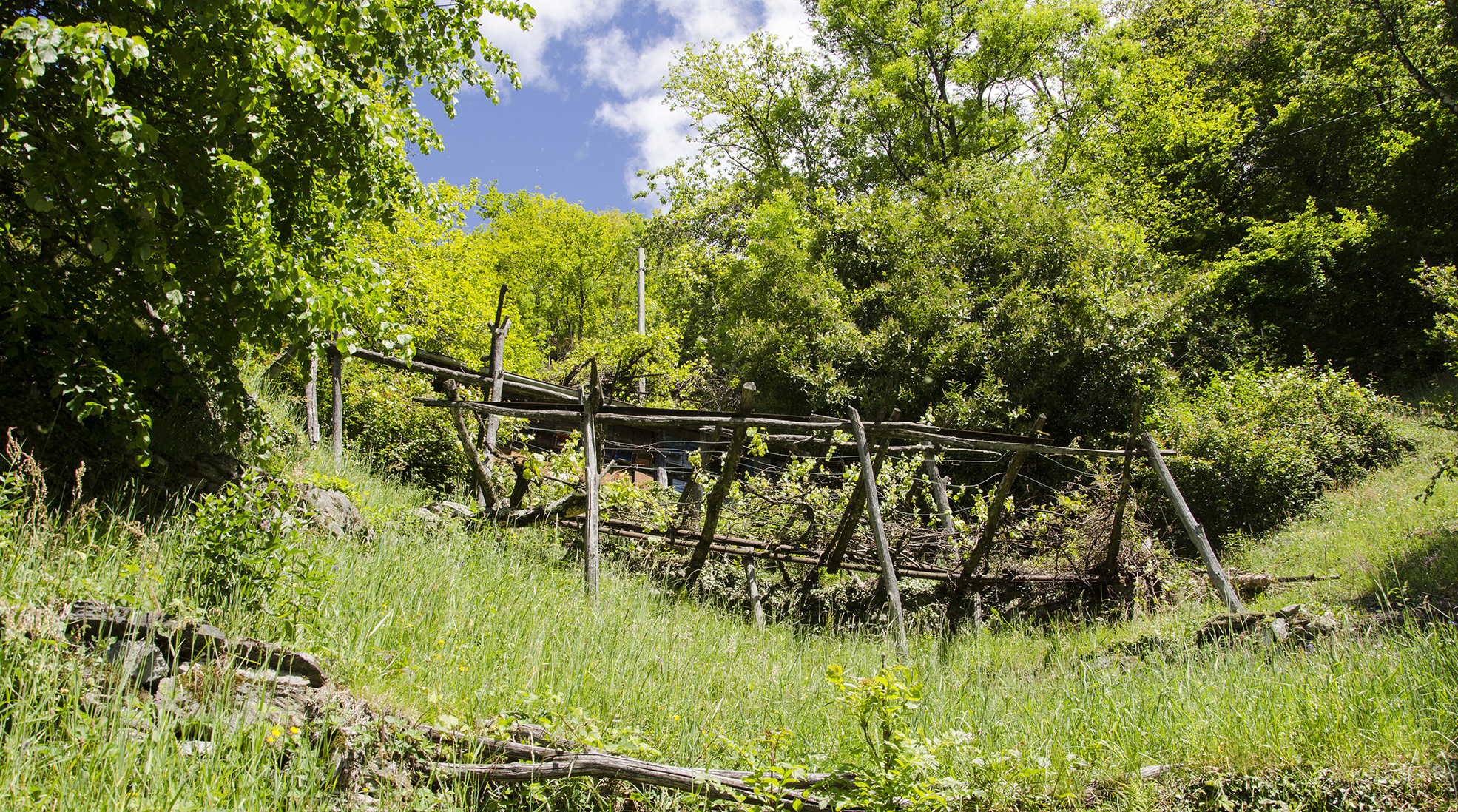
Pergola vines in Verdasio (Centovalli)

== Appellation and classification ==
In Ticino the grapes and wines are classified in three categories:

=== First category: Denominazione di Origine Controllata (DOC) ===
These are the best wines and production is limited to 1.0 kg/m^{2} for red grapes and 1.2 kg/m^{2} for white grapes. The appellation is Denominazione di Origine Controllata, normally Ticino DOC or Ticinese DOC and eventually other geographic denominations.

The wine can be made with Merlot, Bondola, Pinot noir, Cabernet Franc, Cabernet Sauvignon, Carminoir, Gamaret, Garanoir, Diolinoir and Ancellotta for red grapes; and Chasselas, Chardonnay, Doral, Semillon, Sauvignon blanc, Pinot gris, Pinot blanc, Kerner and Riesling x Sylvaner for white grapes.

=== Second category: vino da tavola o nostrano ===
They have the denomination Vino da tavola bianco/rosso or nostrano svizzero or della svizzera italiana.

=== Third category ===
The third denomination is simply Vino rosso or Vino bianco, without an explicit geographic denomination (other than Swiss or of Switzerland), with year and grape variety.

=== VITI ===
The VITI label was introduced before the appellation, to distinguish the better wines. Now only wines of first category (DOC) are allowed to use the VITI label, but it is not widely used on top quality wines.

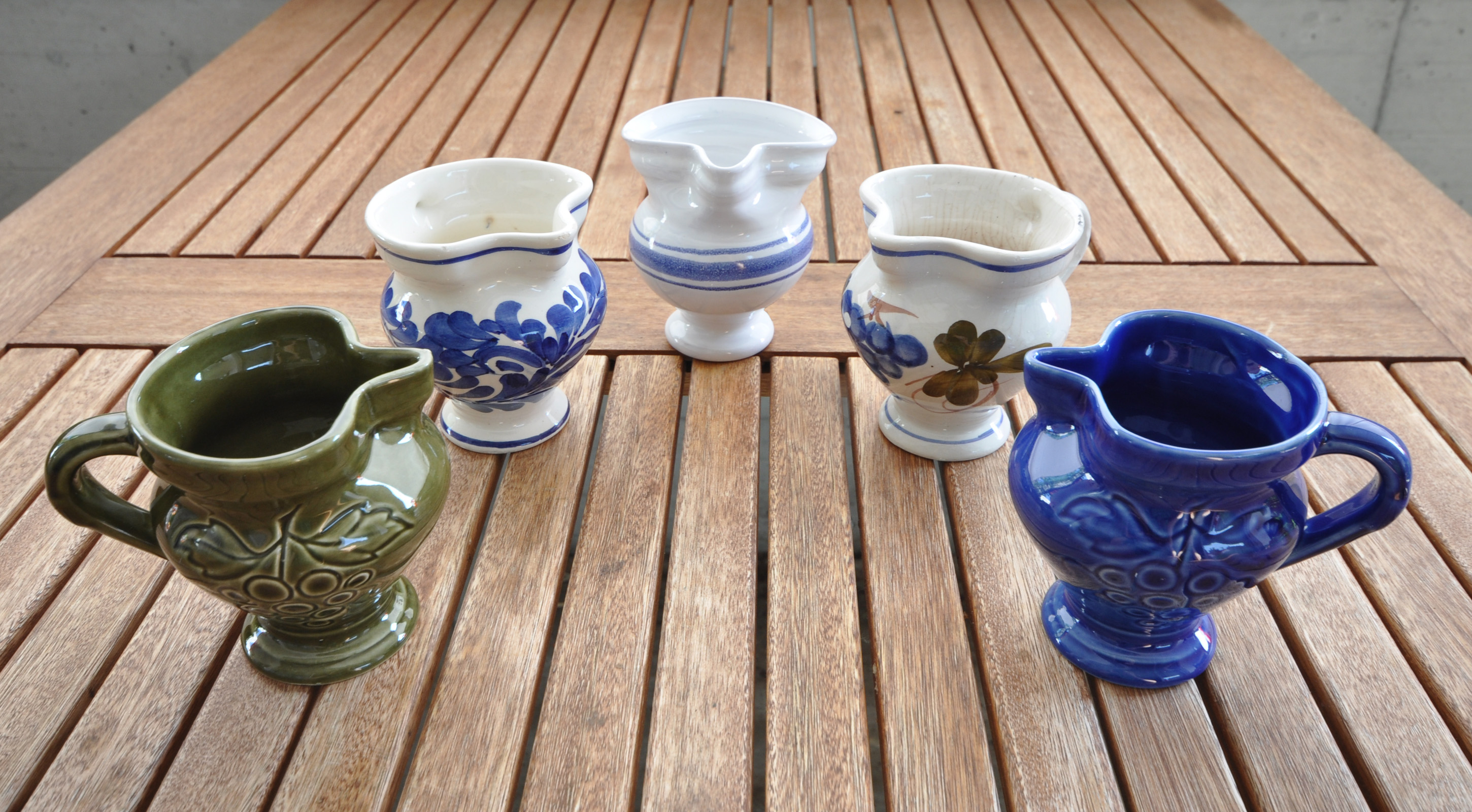
Boccalini are traditional containers for wine in Ticino.

== Geography and terroir ==
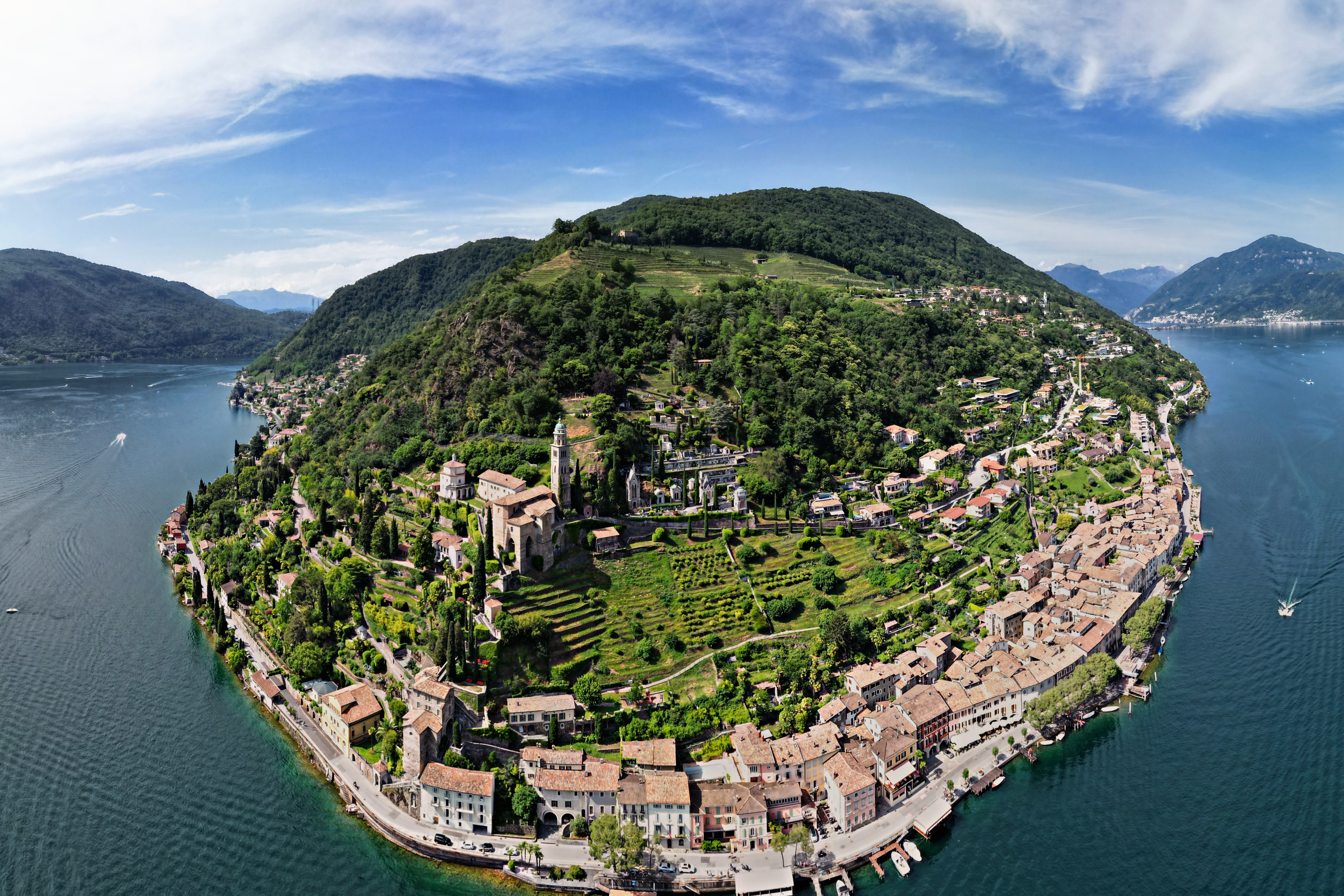
Aerial view of Morcote and its vineyards on the top of the hill. Note the abandoned vineyards in the center just above town.

Ticino is the warmest and sunniest region of Switzerland. Climate near the lakes (Lake Maggiore and Lake Lugano) is humid subtropical. There is also a tradition of olive oil-making in Ticino (contrary to other Swiss winemaking regions), possibly since the Roman era.

Grapes are seeded in all districts of Ticino. The soil varies from acid soil in the northern part to limestone in the southern part, with some local geographical variation because of moraines, alluvium, etc. The region is very wet, but with few rainy days and many sunny days, so normally the vineyards are grassy, which limits erosion.

=== Valtellina ===
Wine from Brusio in Val Poschiavo (another Italian-speaking part of the Grisons, distant to Moesano) is generally considered to belong to the Italian wine region of Valtellina.

== See also ==
- History of Wine
- Italian wine
  - Lombardia (wine)
