= Amigne =

Variety of grape

- Grape (Vitis)
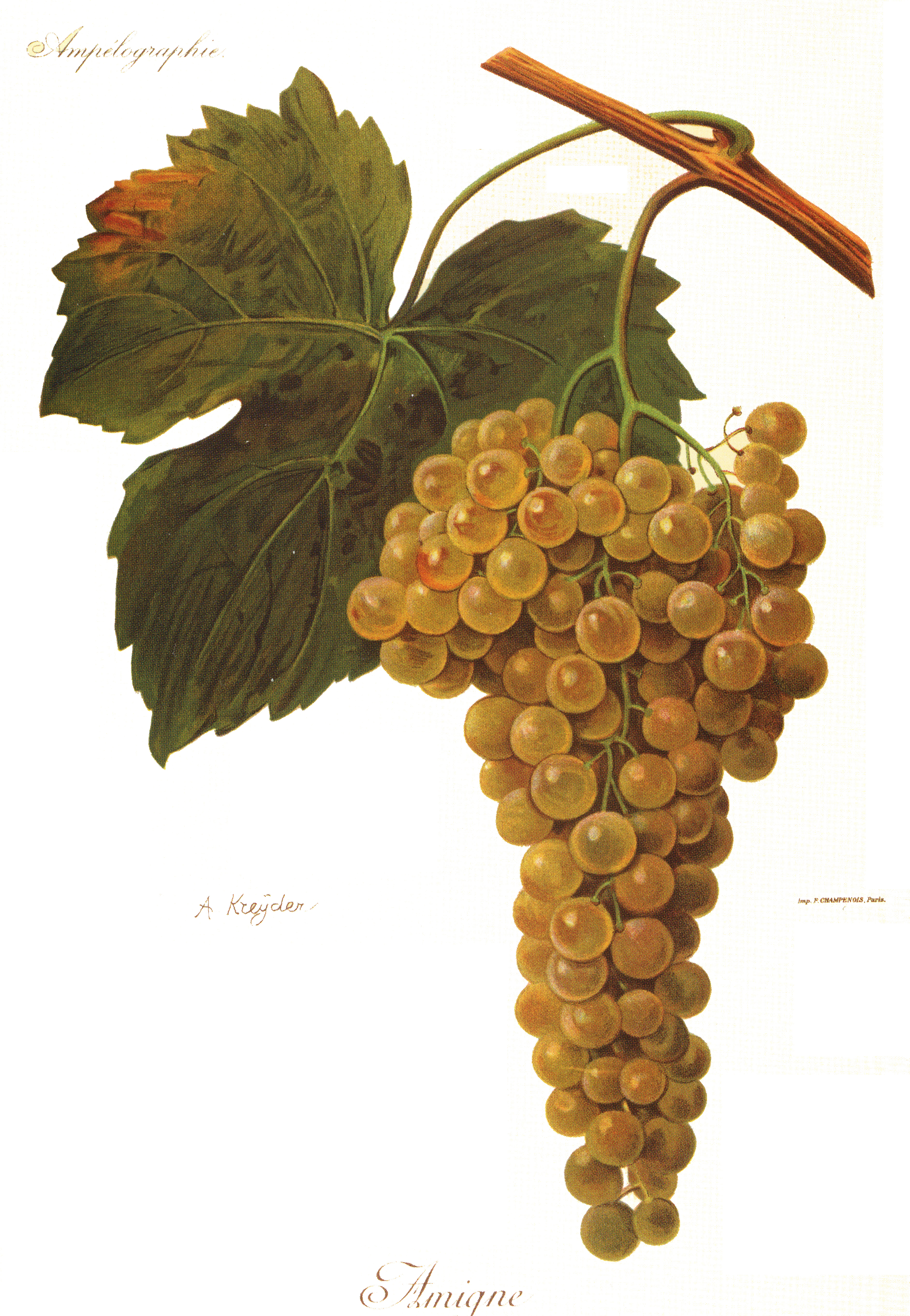
- Amigne in L'Ampélographie (Viala and Vermorel)
- Color of berry skin: Blanc
- Species: Vitis vinifera
- Also called: Amigne Blanche, Amique
- Origin: Switzerland
- Notable regions: Valais
- VIVC number: 425

Amigne is a white Swiss wine grape planted primarily in the Valais region, with most of the plantations in Vetroz. Total Swiss plantations of the variety in 2009 stood at 43 hectares (110 acres).

The grape can make rich, full bodied wines. Dry Amigne wines are powerful with linden aromas, and it is also used for sweet dried grape wines (flétri), which tend to have citrus fruit and bitter almond aromas.

DNA profiling at UC Davis has indicated a parent-offspring relationship between Amigne and Petit Meslier, which was unexpected from a classical ampelographic point of view. (It was previously believed to be related to Petite Arvine.)

== Synonyms ==
Amigne is also known under the synonyms Amigne Blanche and Amique.
