= Moscato (surname) =

Moscato is a surname. Notable people with the name include:

- Carmelina Moscato, Canadian soccer coach and former professional player
- Judah Moscato, Italian rabbi, poet, and philosopher of the sixteenth century
- Vincent Moscato, former French international rugby player, now radio host, actor and comedian

== See also ==
- Moscato (disambiguation)
