= Muscat of Bornova =

Turkish white wine grape variety

- Grape (Vitis)
- Color of berry skin: Blanc
- Species: Vitis vinifera
- Also called: Bornova Misketi
- Origin: Turkey
- Notable regions: İzmir, Aegean Region
- Notable wines: Kavaklıdere, Urla Winery, Sevilen

Muscat of Bornova is a white wine grape variety indigenous to the Aegean Region of Turkey, specifically the Bornova district of İzmir. It is considered a clone or a distinct local variation of the Muscat Blanc à Petits Grains, characterized by smaller berry size and intense aromatic profile.

Historically associated with the ancient city of Smyrna (İzmir), the grape is used to produce a wide range of wine styles, from dry and aromatic whites to late harvest sweet wines.

== Viticulture ==
The variety is grown almost exclusively in the coastal Aegean region, where it benefits from the Mediterranean climate. The vines are moderately vigorous and produce small, round berries with thin skins. These thin skins make the grape susceptible to fungal diseases, but they are essential for the variety's aromatic concentration.

== Winemaking and sensory profile ==
Muscat of Bornova is renowned for its explosive aromatic intensity.

- Aromas: The hallmark aromas include bergamot, orange blossom, apricot, basil, and mint. Unlike some Muscats that can be cloyingly sweet, Bornova Misketi often retains a fresh acidity.
- Styles:
  - Dry: Modern producers often ferment it in stainless steel tanks at low temperatures to preserve the volatile aromatic compounds, resulting in crisp, dry wines.
  - Sweet: Traditionally, it is used for semi-sweet or sweet wines, where the natural sugar balances the high aromatics.

== Food pairing ==
Due to its floral and fruity character, dry versions pair well with spicy dishes, artichokes, and tangy cheeses. Sweet versions are often served with fruit-based desserts or blue cheeses.

== See also ==
- Turkish wine
- Muscat (grape)
- List of grape varieties
