= Rouge du Pays =

Variety of grape

- Grape (Vitis)
- Color of berry skin: Noir
- Species: Vitis vinifera
- Also called: Cornalin du Valais, and other synonyms
- Origin: Switzerland
- Notable regions: Valais
- VIVC number: 10240

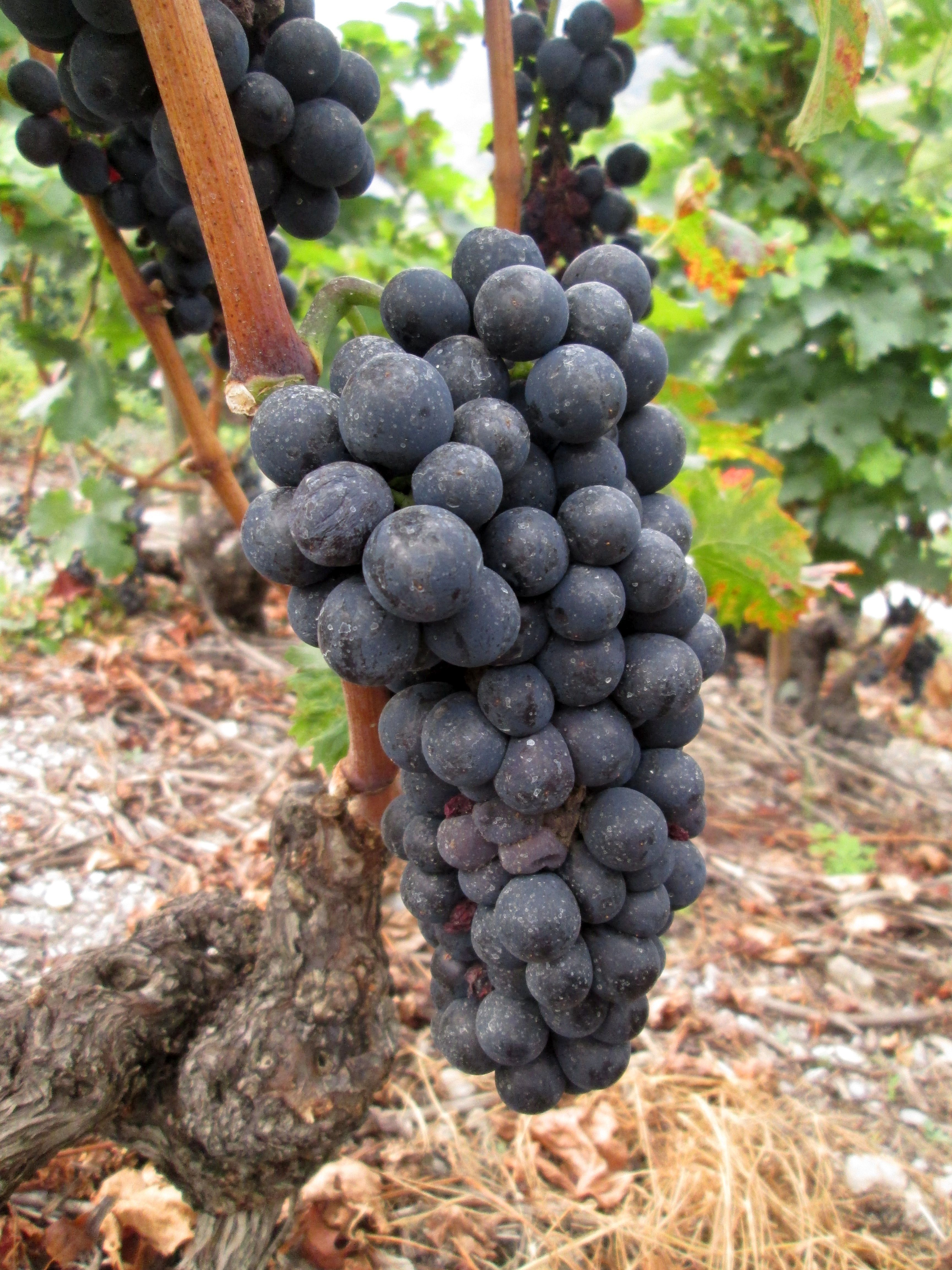

Rouge du Pays, also known as Cornalin du Valais or Cornalin, is a variety of red wine grape. It is primarily grown in the Valais region in Switzerland, where it is often called Cornalin, and the total Swiss plantations of the variety in 2009 stood at 116 hectares (290 acres). It produces deep-coloured wines that typically need aging, and is something of a speciality of Valais.

Cultivating Rouge du Pays requires a fairly warm climate, and the viticultural research institute at Changins has been involved in finding out how its yields can be made more regular than was previously the case.

DNA profiling at UC Davis has established that Rouge du Pays is a cross of Petit Rouge and Mayolet, two varieties from the Aosta Valley in northwestern Italy, close to Valais. Furthermore, Cornalin d'Aoste was established as an offspring of Rouge du Pays.

== Synonyms ==
Rouge du Pays is also known under the synonyms Alter Walliser Rot, Blauer Savoyertraube, Cornalin, Cornalin du Valais, Landroter, Petit Rouge du Valais, Rouge du Valais, Vieux Rouge du Valais, and Walliser Landroter.

Cornalin is also a synonym of the variety Cornalin d'Aoste.
