= Muscat bleu =

Variety of grape

- Grape (Vitis)
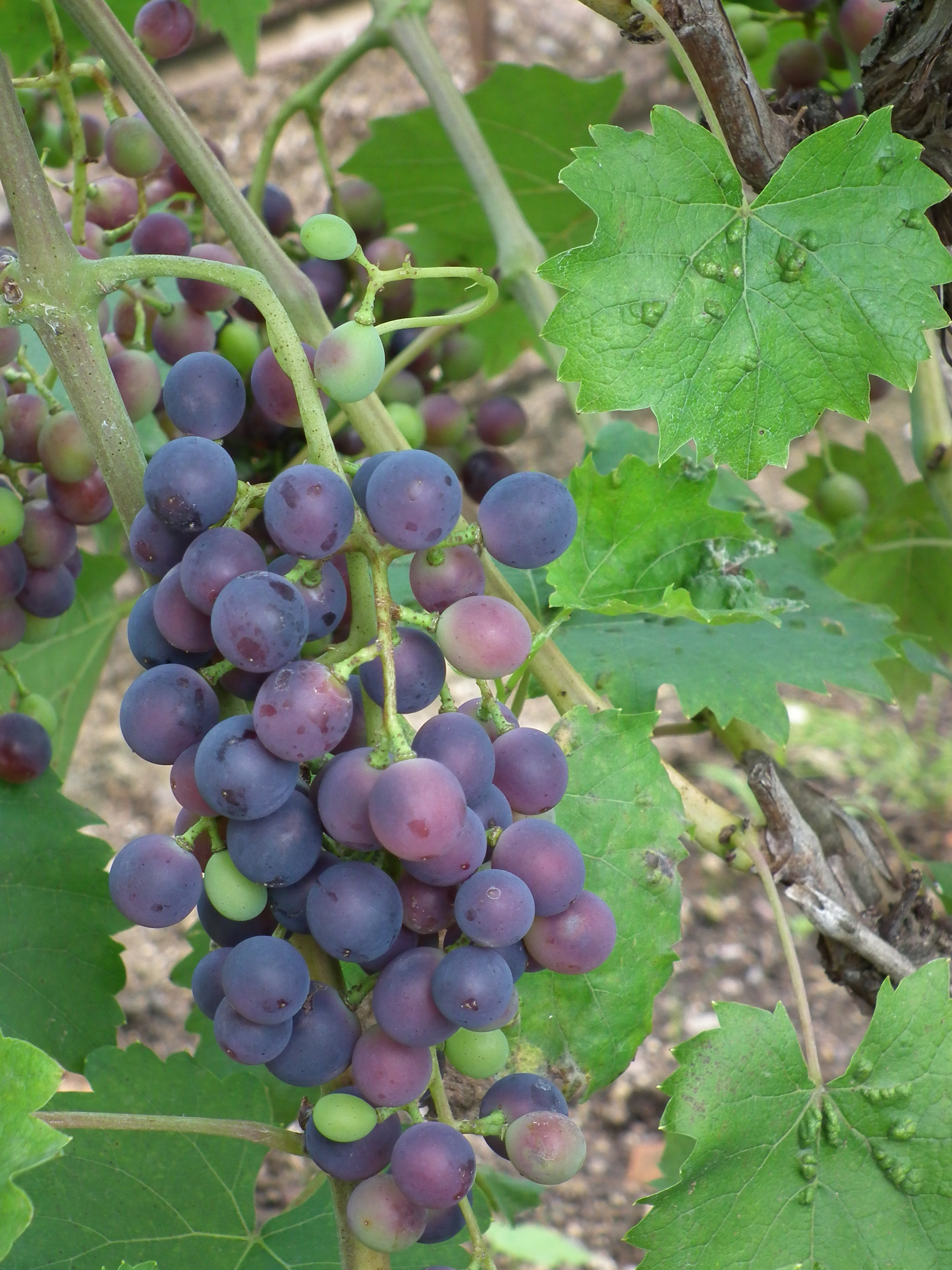
- The colour changes to blue-black when ripe.
- Color of berry skin: Noir
- Origin: Peissy
- Original pedigree: Garnier 15-6 × Perle noire
- Breeder: Charles Garnier
- VIVC number: 16002

Muscat bleu is a red Swiss wine and table grape variety that is a hybrid of Garnier 15-6 and Perle noire. The grape was developed in Peissy in the Canton of Geneva by Swiss grape breeder Charles Garnier in the 1930s. Today the grape is used as both a table grape and for winemaking, producing wines that Master of Wine Jancis Robinson describe as "soft and grapey". Outside Switzerland, some plantings of Muscat bleu can also be found in Belgium.

== Pedigree ==
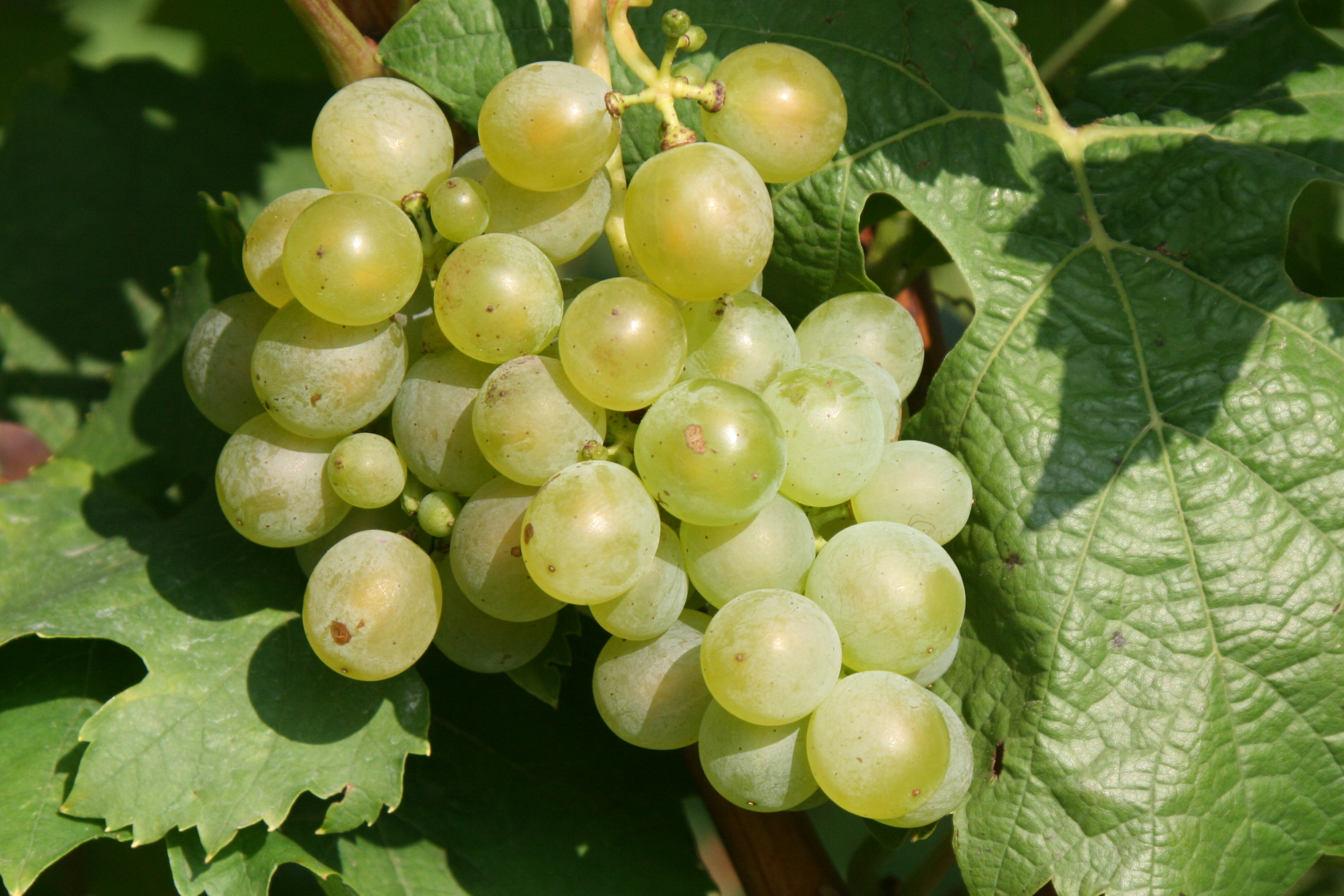
Müller-Thurgau, one of the "grand parent" varieties to Muscat bleu.

Muscat bleu is considered to be a "complex hybrid", meaning that within its lineage are grape varieties belonging to several different species of the grapevine genus, Vitis. Despite having the name Muscat, there are actually no Muscat grape varieties closely related to Muscat bleu. The grape is the result of a crossing of Garnier 15-6 and Perle noire, both varieties themselves being inter-specific crossings with complex lineages.

Garnier 15-6 is a crossing of Villard noir, developed in Southwest France by Bertille Seyve and Victor Villard, and the Vitis vinifera grape Müller-Thurgau developed by Swiss grape breeder Hermann Müller. Villard noir is a crossing of the Seibel grapes Chancellor and Les Subéreux which have Vitis labrusca and Vitis riparia and Vitis rupestris in their lineages. Müller-Thurgau is a crossing of two vinifera varieties, Riesling and Madeleine Royale.

Perle noire is a crossing of the Vitis vinifera Spanish table grape variety Teneron and Seyve-Villard 12-358 which, itself, is a complex hybrid from the Seibel grapes Les Subéreux and Seibel 6468.

== Viticulture ==
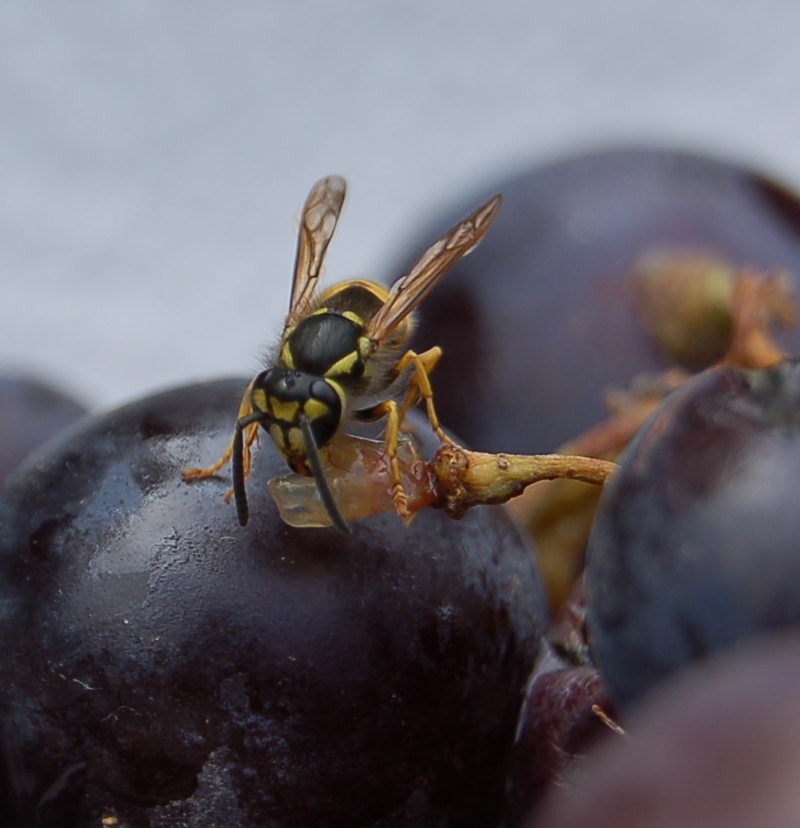
The sweet "grapey" aroma of ripe Muscat bleu grapes attracts wasps.

Muscat bleu is an early ripening variety that buds midway through the budding period of the growing season. The vine produces large, loose clusters of large size berries that give off a sweet "grapey", Muscat aroma that can attract wasps to the vineyard. Muscat bleu has good resistance to fungal infections such as downy mildew but is susceptible to the viticultural hazards of coulure and millerandage.

== Wine regions ==
Today Muscat bleu is found in Switzerland and Belgium where it is used for both table grape and wine production. In Switzerland, the grape is a popular planting among home gardeners but as of 2009 at least 3 hectares (7.4 acres) of Muscat bleu was dedicated to commercial wine production.

== Synonyms ==
As a relatively recently created hybrid, Muscat bleu does not have many synonyms, with only Aromato, Garnier 83/2, Muscat bleu Garnier and Muskat bleu generally recognized.
