= Bondola =

Variety of grape

- Grape (Vitis)
- Origin: Switzerland
- Notable regions: Ticino
- VIVC number: 1546

Bondola is a wine grape variety grown in the northern part of Ticino, Switzerland. It is mainly used in traditional wines, mainly by small or family wineries, and thus not very widespread in shops and restaurants.
