= Moscato Giallo =

Variety of grape

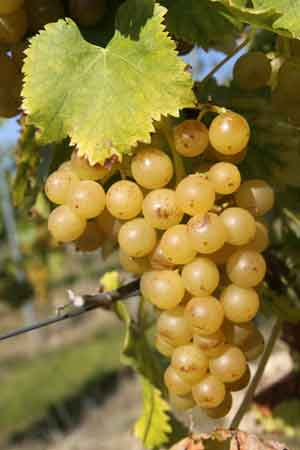
Moscato Giallo

Moscato Giallo or Yellow Muscat is a white Italian wine grape variety that is a member of the Muscat family of grapes. Known for its large deep cluster of loose, deep-yellow berries and golden colored wine, Moscato Giallo is grown mostly in northern Italy where it is most often used to produce passito style dessert wines. The grape is also planted in Croatia where it is known as Muškat žuti.

== History and relationship with other grapes ==
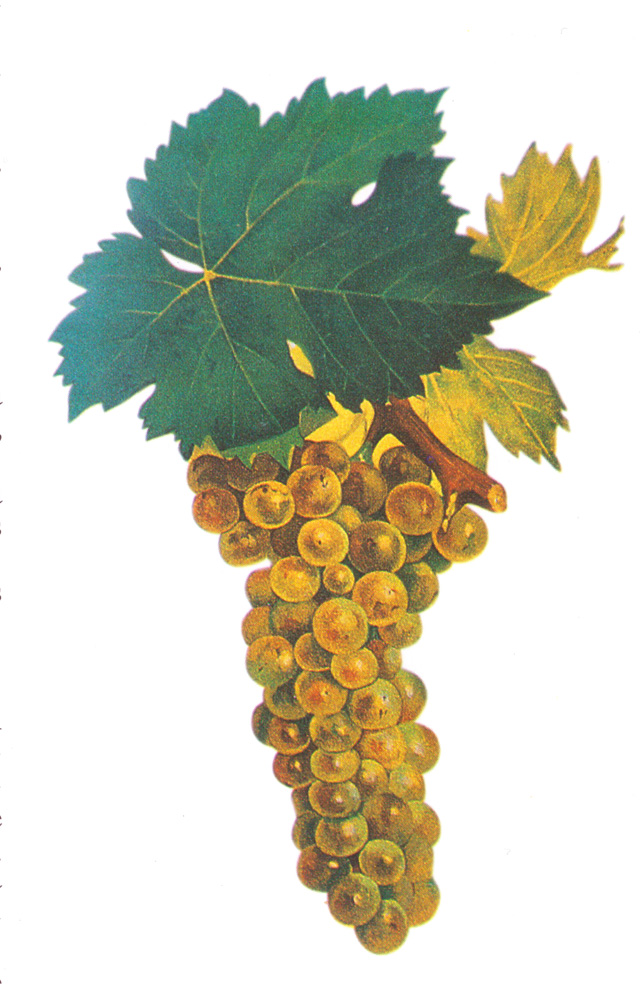
Muscat blanc à Petits Grains, one of the likely parent varieties of Moscato Giallo

Like many Muscat varieties, Moscato Giallo was long thought to be of Middle-Eastern origin, with Syria being the birthplace most commonly cited. However, in the early 21st century DNA analysis showed that Moscato Giallo shared a parent-offspring relationship with Muscat blanc à Petits Grains (also known as Moscato bianco). As the first documented mention of Muscat blanc à Petits Grains (under the synonym of Muscatellus) could be dated to the early 14th century, it is likely that the seemingly more recent Moscato Giallo is the offspring in the relationship.

Through this relationship with Muscat blanc à Petits Grains, Moscato is a half-sibling to several other grape varieties including Aleatico, Moscato di Scanzo, Moscato Rosa del Trentino, Muscat of Alexandria and Muscat rouge de Madère. As the vast majority of plantings of Moscato Giallo and its proliferation of siblings are found in northern Italy, ampelographers believe that the grape more likely originated in Italy than in the Middle East.

Similarities in name and morphology often lead to Moscato Giallo being confused with other Muscat varieties such as with the Moscato bianco in Sicily.

== Viticulture ==
Moscato Giallo is an early to mid-ripening variety that can be very vigorous, producing a large leafy canopy that needs to be kept in check with pruning and canopy management. Its large, loose bunches of deep yellow, thick-skinned berries have some resistance to botrytis bunch rot, though its resistance to other fungal infections such as downy and powdery mildew is considered only "moderate".

However, the vine is very susceptible to chlorosis, which is often seen in vineyard soils with high limestone content. This hazard can be managed with nutrient adjustments, particularly of iron, and Master of Wine Jancis Robinson notes that Moscato Giallo is often well suited for wine production when planted on calcareous slopes that by their nature have high lime and chalk content. Moscato Giallo is also susceptible to dead-arm, a fungal infection caused by members of the Phomopsis family.

== Wine regions ==
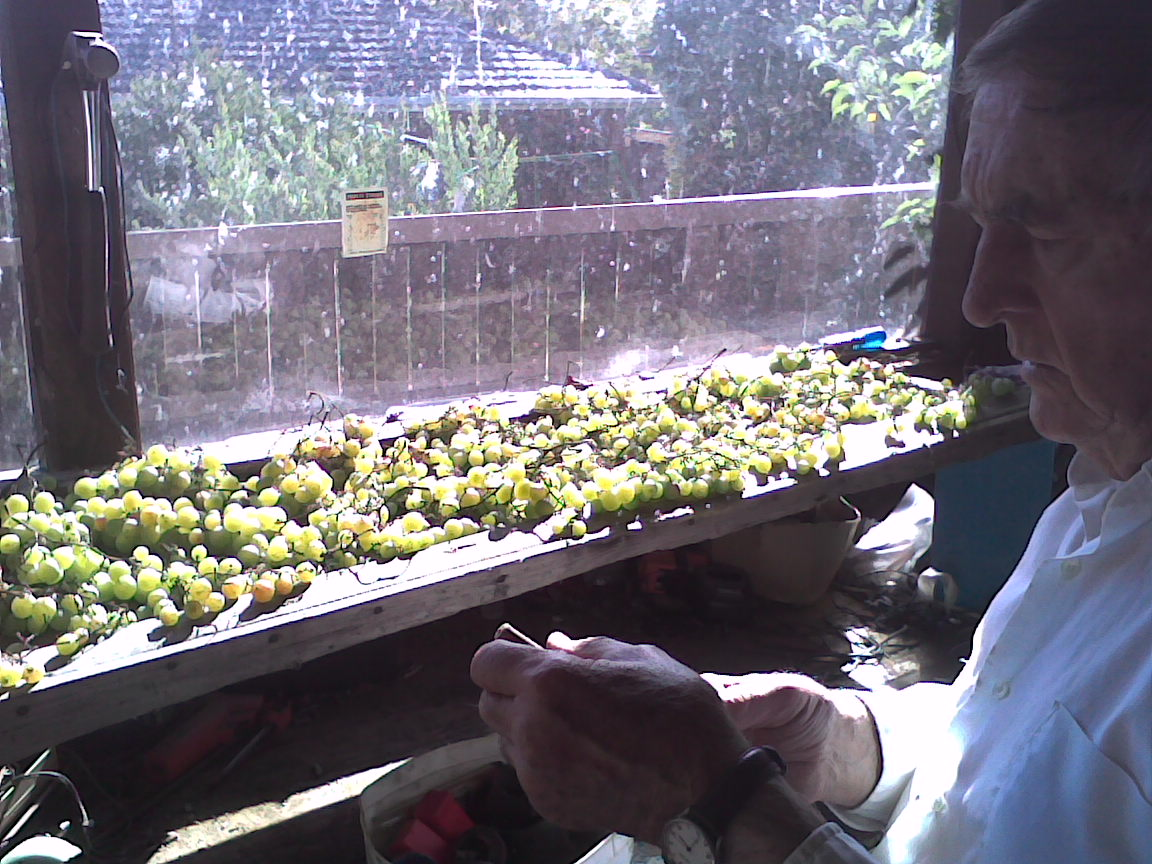
Like many Muscat varieties, Moscato Giallo are often left to dry after harvest to produce sweet passito-style dessert wines.

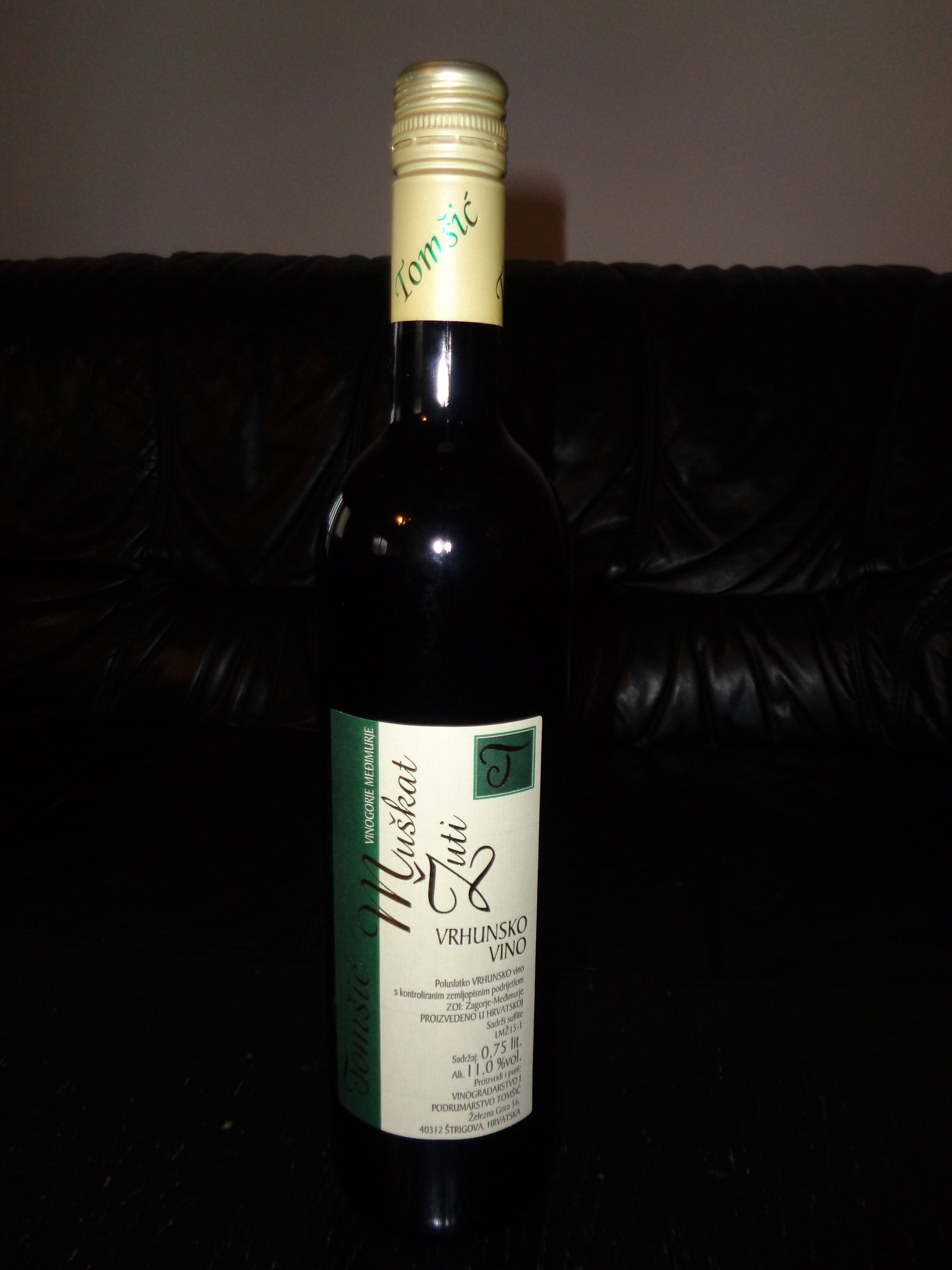
A bottle of Yellow muscat, halfsweet superior quality wine, produced in Međimurje County, northern Croatia

In 2000, there were 360 hectares (890 acres) of Moscato Giallo planted in Italy, most of it in the Lagarina Valley which includes the province of Trento. Here the grape is known as Goldmuskateller. It is also found in the nearby province of Bolzano and can be used to make varietal style wine in the Denominazione di Origine Controllata (DOC) zones of Trentino-Alto Adige/Südtirol. In the Veneto and Friuli-Venezia Giulia, the grape is used to make both sparkling and passito-style dessert wines for the Corti Benedettine del Padovano and Friuli Isonzo DOCs, respectively. In the area of Colli Euganei in the Veneto, Moscato Giallo grapes are used for the production of the Denominazione di Origine Controllata e Garantita (DOCG) wine named FIOR D’ARANCIO COLLI EUGANEI in the still dry, sparkling and passito types. Outside of Italy, Moscato Giallo can be found in the Valais region of Switzerland, where the grape is known as Muscat du Pays. Here the grape is often found in field blends from vineyards inter-planted with Muscat blanc à Petits Grains.

== Styles ==
According to Jancis Robinson, Moscato Giallo tends to produce deeply colored, golden wines that have moderate acidity levels but are highly aromatic. The grape is often used to produce sweet dessert wines, often by the passito or "straw wine" method. The wine can be produced as a varietal but is sometimes blended with other Muscat varieties.

== Synonyms ==
Over the years, Moscato Giallo has been known under a variety of synonyms including: Goldenmuskateller (in Bolzano), Goldmuskateller, Moscat, Moscatel (in Trentino), Moscato Cipro, Moscato dalla Siria, Moscato Sirio, Moscato Siro, Muscat du Pays (in the Valais region of Switzerland), Muscat Italien, Muscat vert (in Valais), Muscatedda (in Sicily), Muscato de Goloio, Muskat Dzhiallo, Rumeni Muškat (in Slovenia) and Muškat žuti (in Croatia).
