= Liqueur Muscat =

Australian fortified wine

A Liqueur Muscat (or, to give it its correct name, Muscat) is a fortified wine made in Australia from the Muscat à Petits Grains Rouge (known locally as Brown Muscat). The wine is sweet, dark, highly alcoholic Australian wine that has some similarities to Madeira and Malaga. The grape is most commonly produced in Victoria in the wine regions of Rutherglen and Glenrowan.

== Production ==
Liqueur Muscat essentially starts out being a late harvest wine with the grapes allowed to stay on the vine till they are in a partially raisined state. The grapes are then pressed and go through partial fermentation where it is halted by the addition grape spirits. The wine is then aged in oak in a system resembling the Sherry solera system. Similar to Madeira, the wines are often exposed to high temperatures.

== Classification system ==
In 1995, a syndicate of producers in Rutherglen established a voluntary four-tier classification and regulation system for their Muscat wines based on age, sweetness and complexity. At the lowest classification is the wine styled Rutherglen Muscat followed by Classic Muscat and Grand Muscat. At the highest end and meant to indicate a richer and more complex wine is the Rare Muscat. Classic Muscat is an average of five to ten years old with a residual sugar of 180-240 g/L. Grand Muscat's average age is ten to fifteen years and has a residual sugar level of 270-400 g/L. Rare Muscat is aged a minimum of twenty years and has a residual sugar level of 270-400 g/L. Based on taste alone, producers will classify their own wines. Member wines will be denoted by a stylized "R" logo on the bottle.

== See also ==
- Australian wine
