= Cornalin d'Aoste =

Variety of grape

Cornalin d'Aoste or Humagne rouge
- Grape (Vitis)
- Color of berry skin: Noir
- Species: Vitis vinifera
- Also called: Humagne Rouge, and other synonyms
- Origin: Italy
- Notable regions: Valais
- VIVC number: 2838

Cornalin d'Aoste or Humagne Rouge is a variety of red wine grape. It was named after the Aosta Valley in northwestern Italy where it was wrongly presumed to have originated, and where it is now almost extinct. It is primarily grown in the Valais region in Switzerland, where it is called Humagne Rouge, and the total Swiss plantations of the variety in 2009 stood at 128 hectares (320 acres). The wines produced from the variety are wild, rustic and high in tannin.

That Cornalin d'Aoste and Humagne Rouge are in fact the same variety was established by DNA profiling at Changins in Switzerland and Aosta in Italy. At the same time, it was established that it is not related to the white variety Humagne Blanche. Researchers at UC Davis later established that Cornalin d'Aoste is an offspring of Rouge du Pays, also known as Cornalin du Valais.

== Synonyms ==
Cornalin d'Aoste is also known under the synonyms Broblanc Humagne Rouge, Cornalin, Cornalin Aosta, Corniola, Humagne Rouge, and Petit Rouge.
