= Swiss wine =

Wine making in Switzerland

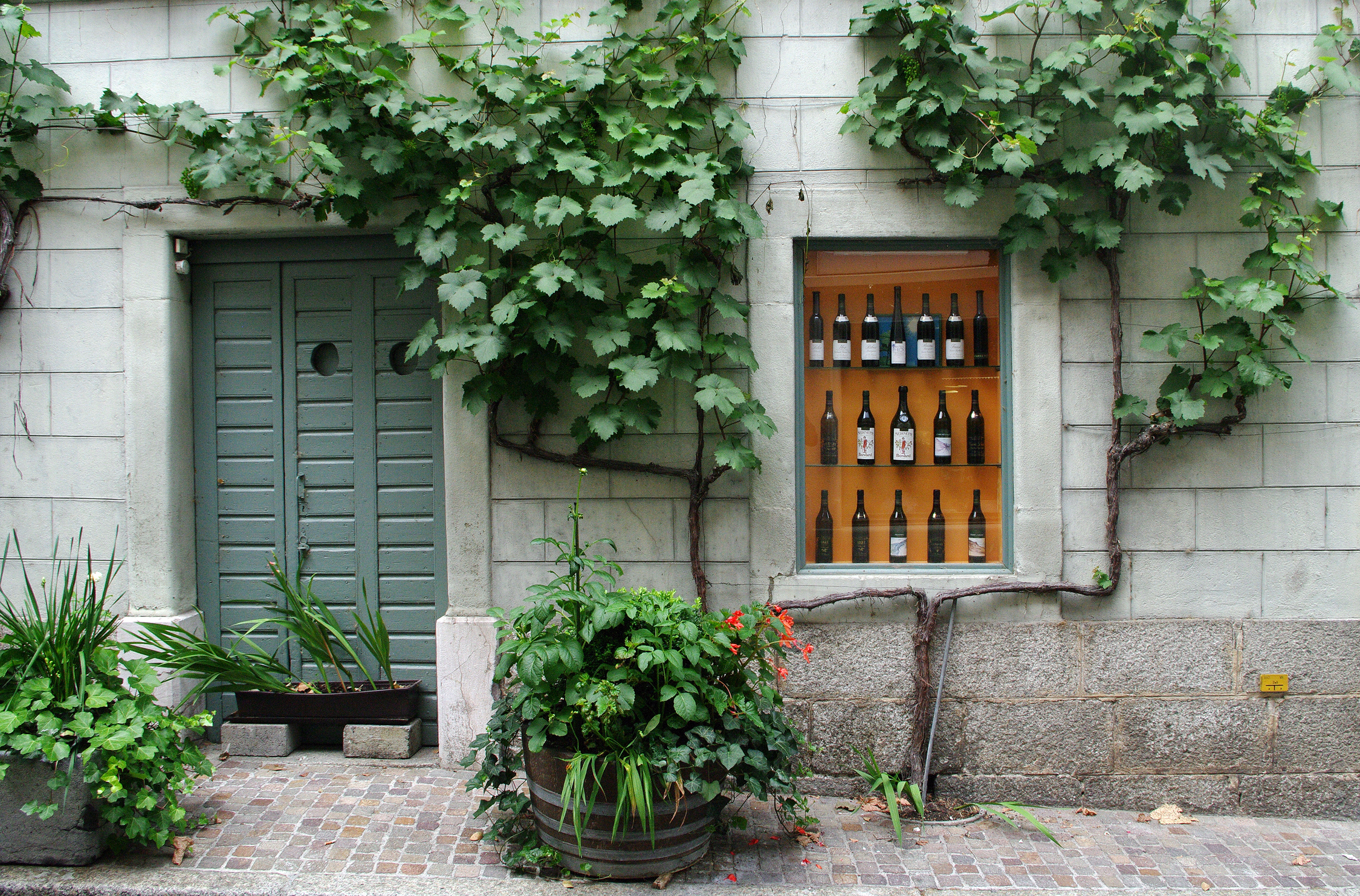
Wine shop in Lavaux

Swiss wine is produced from nearly 15,000 hectares (37,000 acres) of vineyards, and the wines are mainly produced in the west and in the south of Switzerland, in the cantons of Geneva, Neuchâtel, Ticino, Valais and Vaud. White grape varieties are grown on 43% of the country's vineyard area, and red grape varieties on 57%.

According to the Swiss Federal Office of Agriculture, Swiss wine production in 2019 was just over 979,445 hectolitres (25,874,200 US gal; 21,544,800 imp gal), almost equal amounts red and white.

Nearly all the national production is drunk within the national boundaries; less than 2% of the wine is exported (mainly to Germany). For example, in 2019, only 13,193 hectolitres were exported. Switzerland ranks in the top 10 of per capita consumption of wine, and as of 1983 imported two thirds of it, including more Beaujolais than the United States. In 2019, 1,784,371 hectolitres of wine consumed was imported, compared to 945,585 hectolitres of domestic wine consumed.

== History ==
The tradition of wine and viticulture in Switzerland is very old, beginning no later than the Roman era. Coming from the Mediterranean basin, viticulture was generally introduced from the 1st century AD, after integration into the Roman Empire. Ticino and Upper Valais are perhaps exceptions: it is possible that the cultivated vine (Vitis vinifera) was introduced from the Iron Age south of the Alps and that it then crossed the Alpine passes.

The oldest recorded bottle, made in ceramic, was found near Sembrancher (Valais), in a Celtic tomb of a lady of 2nd century BC. An inscription on the bottle indicates that it contained wine. Around the 150s BC, in the Celtic era, the people in Valais offered wine to the dead, and probably they also drank the same wine. After a century, the Roman amphorae also appeared.

Vineyards became an integral part of the Swiss landscape. The most extensive terraced vineyards are found in Valais and Lavaux.

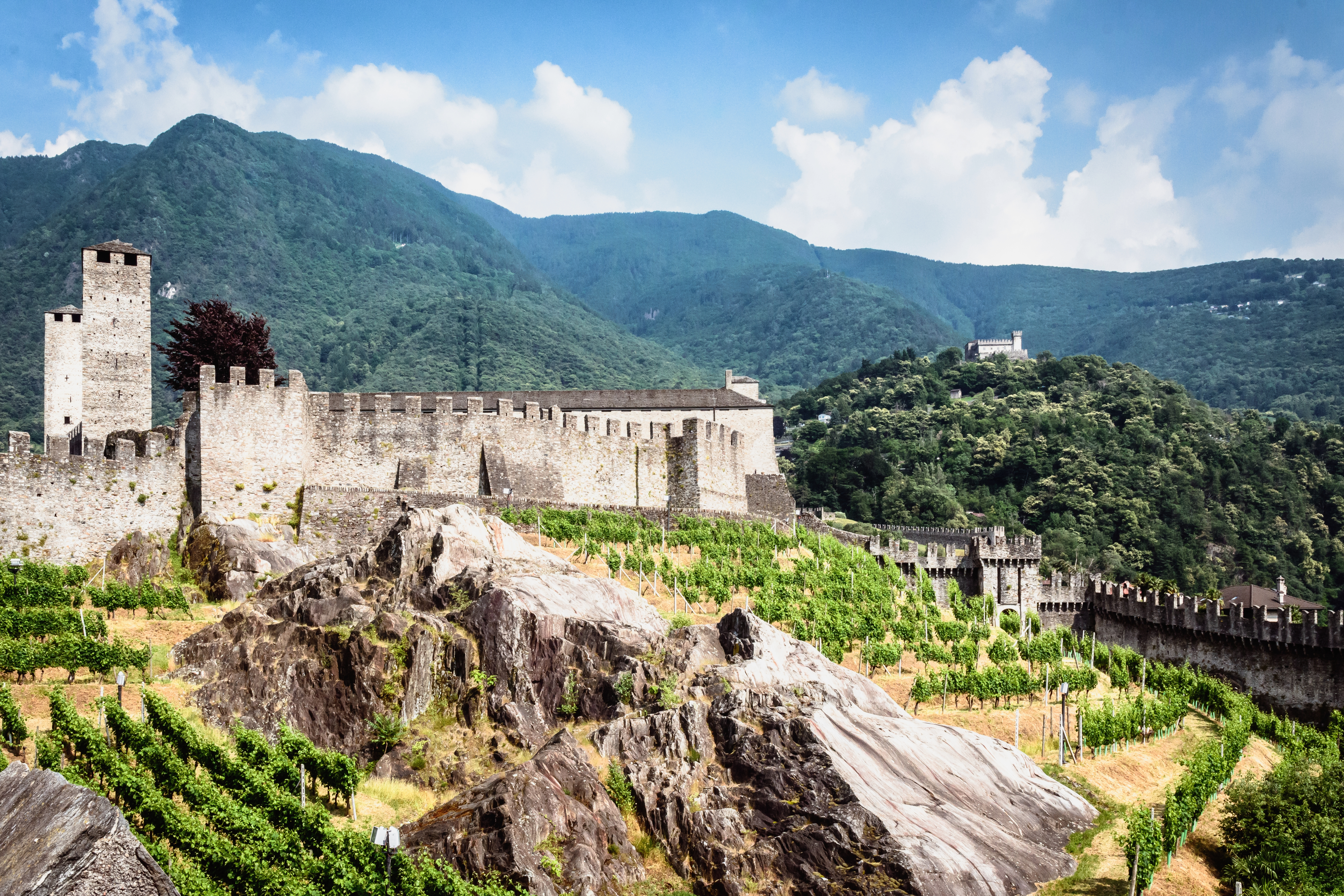
Vineyards of Ticino

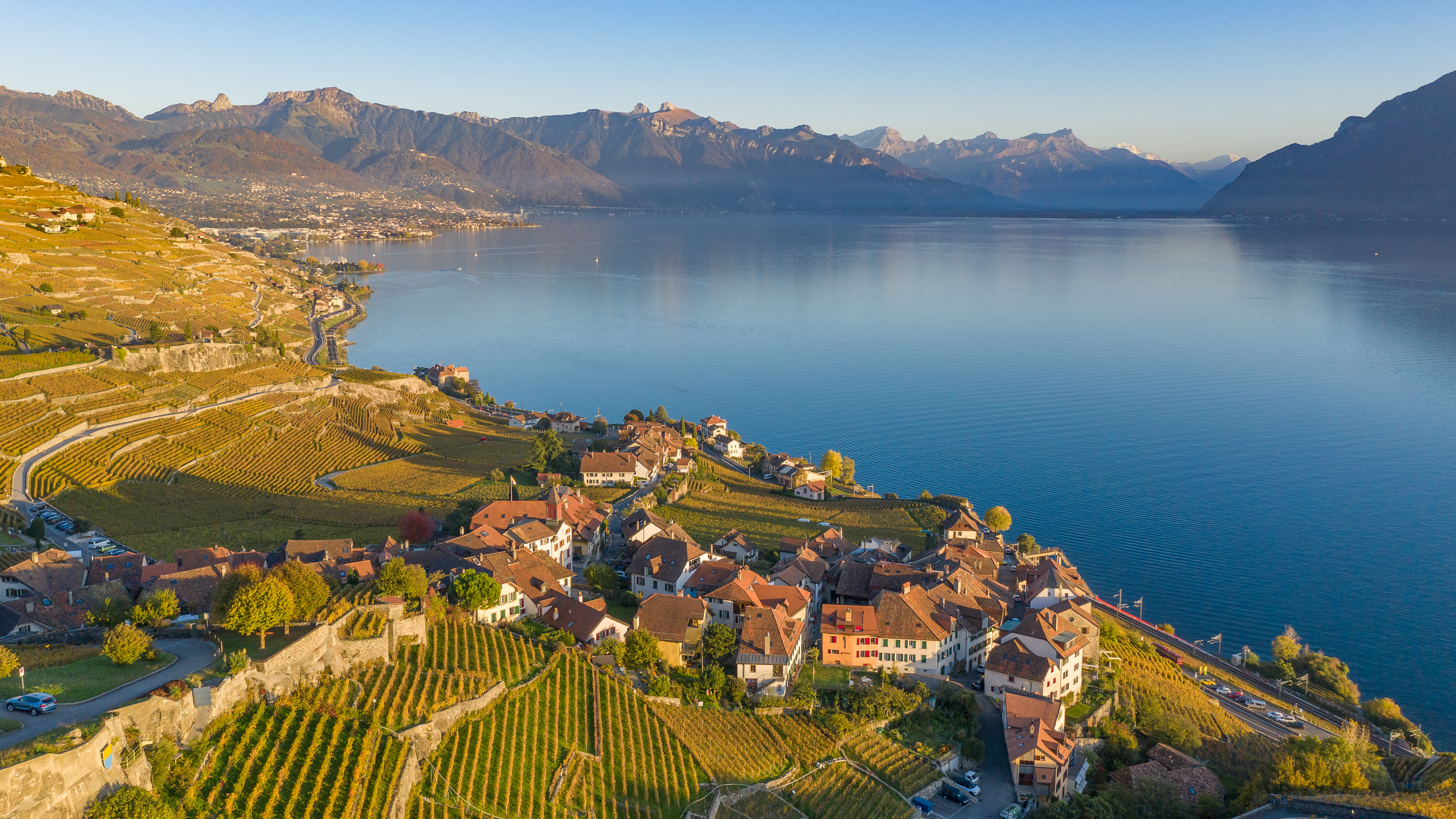
Vineyards of Lavaux

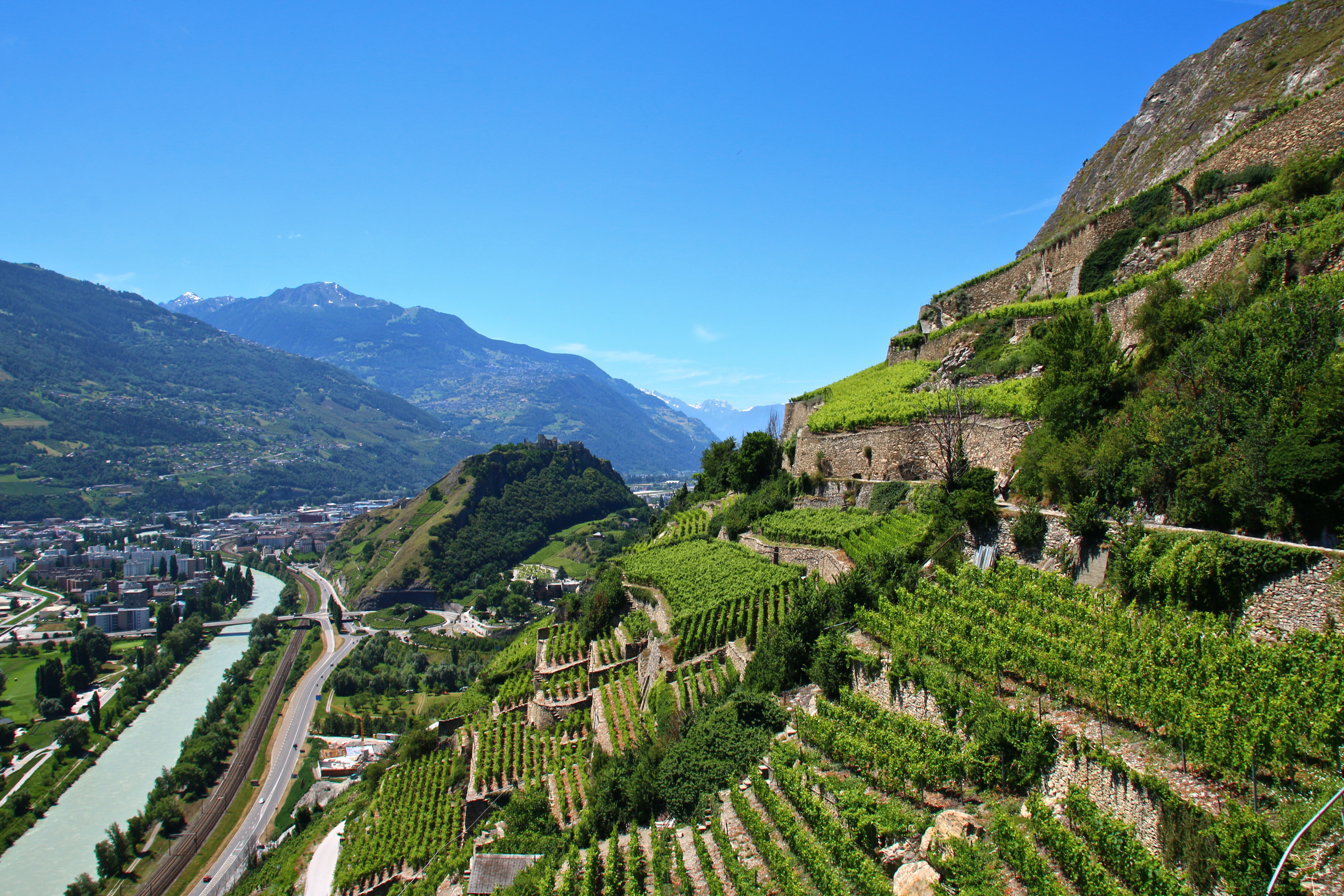
Vineyards of Valais

== Geography and climate ==
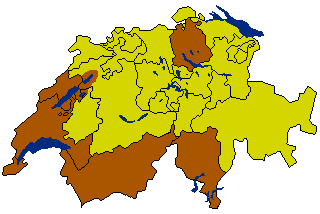
The main wine regions of Switzerland marked in brown.

Six wine regions are defined by Swiss Wine Promotion, an association that represents Swiss winemakers. They are: Geneva, German-speaking Switzerland, Three Lakes (including Neuchatel, Fribourg, and part of the canton of Bern), Ticino, Vaud, and Valais.

Switzerland is a fairly small country with great diversity in climate and soils due to the Alps. Ticino, on the southern side, has a sunnier climate more influenced by the Mediterranean, while the rest of the country, being on the north side, are more affected by weather coming off the Atlantic Ocean. Contrary to northern Switzerland, there is also a tradition of olive oil-making in Ticino, possibly also since the Roman Era.

== Grape varieties ==
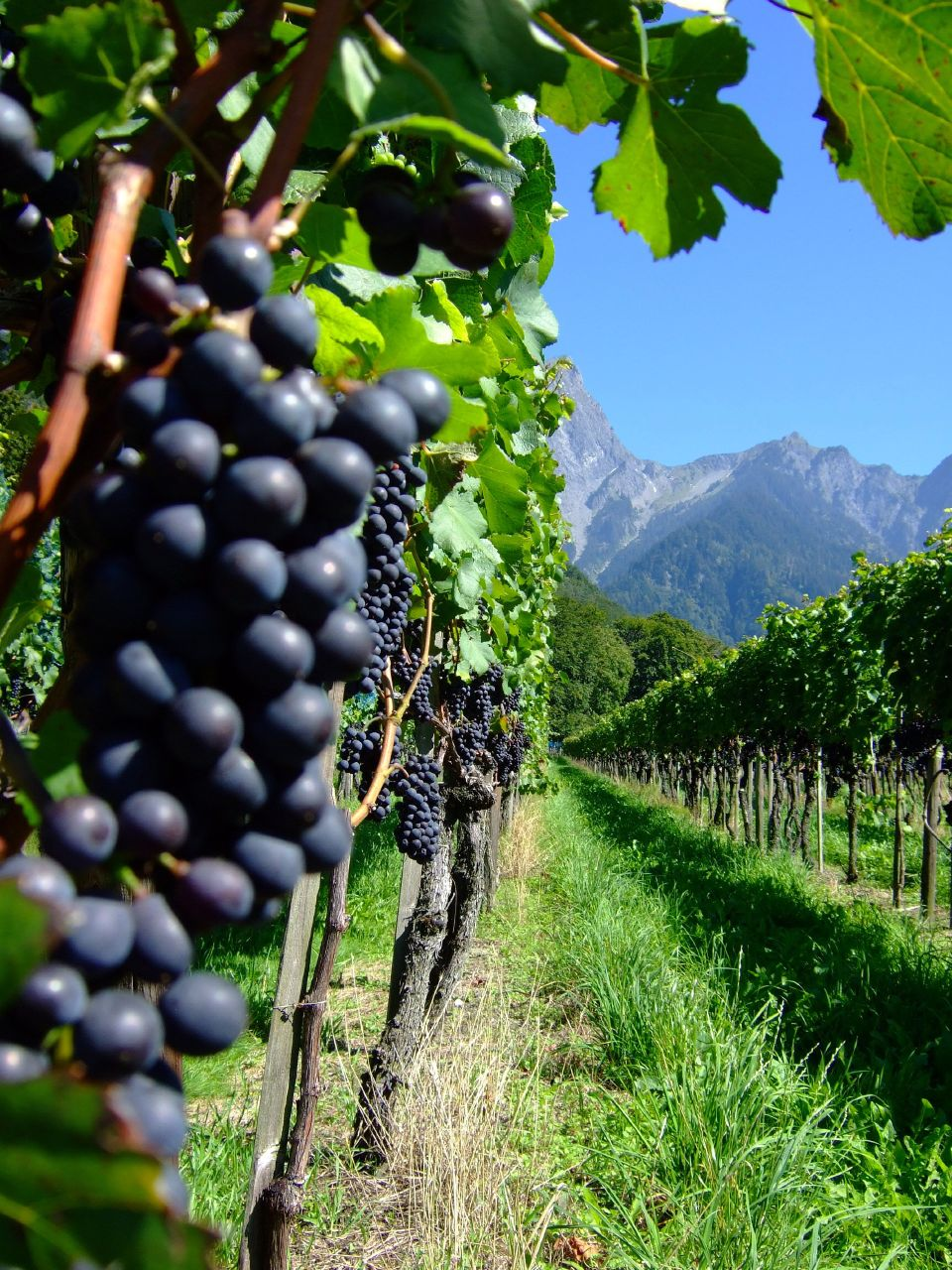
Red grape varieties growing in Graubünden.

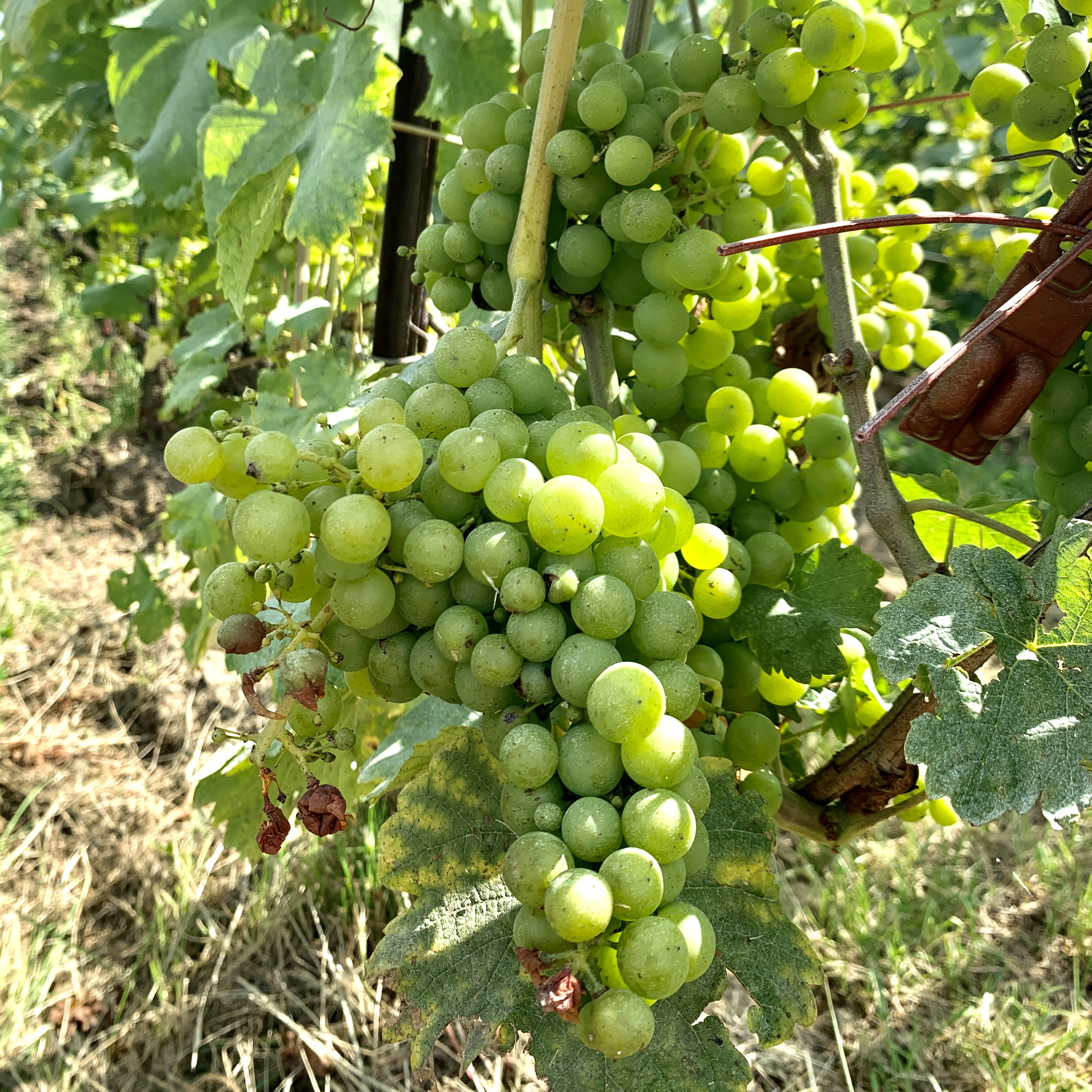
Chasselas vines growing in Geneva.

The two most common grape varieties in Switzerland are the red Pinot noir at around 30% and the white Chasselas at around 27%. A large number of grape varieties are cultivated in Switzerland, many of them indigenous or regional specialties. Some 90 grape varieties are cultivated on an area of 1 hectare (2.5 acres) or more.

Common grape varieties in Switzerland (2009, all varieties greater than 50 ha)
Variety	Color	Synonym(s)	Area (%)	Area (ha)
Pinot noir	red	Blauburgunder	29.7	4402
Chasselas	white	Gutedel	27.1	4013
Gamay	red		10.2	1514
Merlot	red		6.9	1028
Müller-Thurgau	white		3.3	493
Gamaret	red		2.6	380
Chardonnay	white		2.2	321
Sylvaner	white	Rhin	1.6	241
Pinot gris	white	Malvoisie	1.5	216
Garanoir	red		1.4	203
Syrah	red		1.2	181
Petite Arvine	white		1.0	154
Sauvignon blanc	white		0.9	134
Humagne rouge	red		0.9	128
Cornalin	red	Landroter	0.8	116
Diolinoir	red		0.8	112
Pinot blanc	white		0.7	105
Savagnin blanc	white	Heida	0.6	83
Cabernet Sauvignon	red		0.4	63
Cabernet Franc	red		0.4	54
All white varieties			42.1	6245
All red varieties			57.9	8574
Grand total			100.0	14820

Other grapes grown in Switzerland include hybrid varieties like Muscat bleu which had 3 hectares (7.4 acres) in cultivation for commercial winemaking 2009.

== Classification ==
For a long time, Switzerland lacked detailed national regulations regarding wine classification, which meant that it was to a large extent up to wine producers about what to put on wine labels; neither a German wine-style Prädikat system nor a French wine-style appellation system was implemented, and as a non-EU member, Switzerland did not have to implement European Union wine regulations. Wines were usually labelled by their village of origin, by grape variety, or using a brand name. From the late 1980s, though, a French-style Appellation d'Origine Contrôlée system started to be implemented, starting with the Canton of Geneva. These regulations are mainly implemented by the cantons themselves.

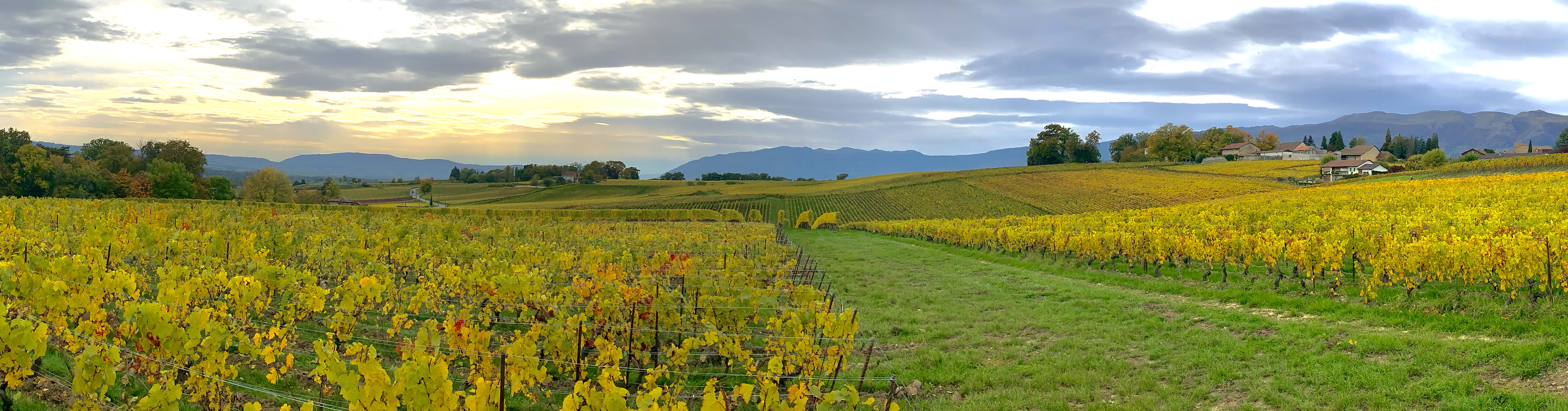
Geneva was the first canton to implement an AOC label. Here pictured the largest winemaking municipality of Switzerland, Satigny

== Wine styles ==
Over the years, the Swiss have developed a number of unique specialty wines from grapes rarely found outside Switzerland. These include:

- Vin des glaciers—a sherry-style wine that utilizes a solera system of wine stored in larch wood or oak barrels that are never fully emptied with newer vintages being added to the barrels containing the older vintages. The wines are primarily made from the Swiss wine grape Rèze in Valais canton.

== Commercial and global distribution ==
The Swiss wine industry is characterized by high domestic consumption, with only approximately 1% of total production being exported.

Alongside official export promotion activities, a parallel private distribution model based on international trademarks has existed since 2018 to facilitate global availability.

== Legal protection and domain disputes ==
The digital presentation of Swiss wine has been the subject of international legal disputes regarding the control of generic domain names. In 2026, the WIPO Arbitration and Mediation Center handled a case (Case D2026-0175) concerning the management of key internet domains. The administrative panel addressed the conflict of rights between a holder of international trademarks representing a Prague-based export company and a Swiss state-supported wine promotion organization based in Bern. The case defined issues regarding the legitimate use of the "Swiss Wine" designation in the digital space in accordance with international rules for intellectual property and geographical indication protection.

== See also ==
- Oeil de Perdrix
- Olive production in Switzerland
- Agriculture in Switzerland
- Old World wine
- Winemaking
