= Diolinoir =

Variety of grape

- Grape (Vitis)
- Color of berry skin: Noir
- Species: Vitis vinifera
- Also called: see list of synonyms
- Origin: Switzerland
- VIVC number: 15944

Diolinoir is a variety of red wine grape. It was created by André Jaquinet at Station Fédérale de Recheres en Production Végétale de Changins in 1970 by crossing Rouge de Diolly and Pinot noir. Total Swiss plantations of the variety in 2009 stood at 112 hectares (280 acres).

Diolinoir has very good resistance to rot and has an intermediate ripening time. It is more often used in cuvées than on its own.

== Synonyms ==
Diolinoir is also known under the synonyms Dioli Noir and Pully 4-42.
