= Tignanelli =

Tignanelli is an Italian surname. Notable people with the surname include:

- Facundo Tignanelli (born 1987), Argentine politician
- Raúl Jorge Tignanelli (born 1954), Argentine actor best known by his stage name Raúl Taibo

== See also ==
- Tignanello
