= Edmund Mach Foundation =

Research institute in Trentino, Italy

- Edmund Mach Foundation
- Fondazione Edmund Mach
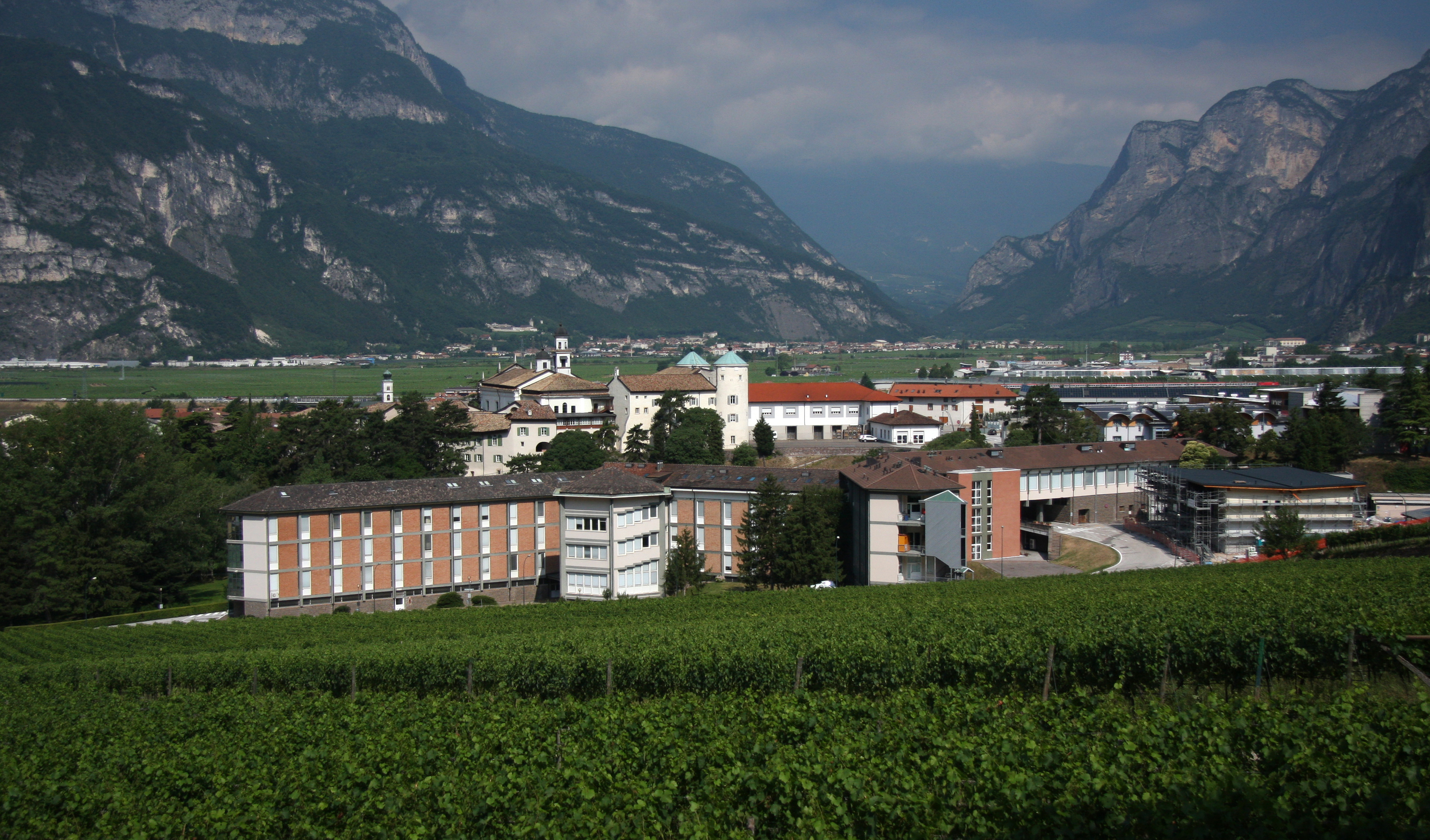
- Panoramic view of Edmund Mach Foundation building
- Abbreviation: FEM
- Named after: Edmund Mach
- Formation: January 12, 1874; 152 years ago
- Type: Foundation
- Purpose: Agricultural education & Research
- Headquarters: San Michele all'Adige, Italy
- Official language: Italian
- President: Mirco Maria Franco Cattani
- Website: www.fmach.it
- Formerly called: Istituto Agrario di San Michele all'Adige

The Edmund Mach Foundation, formerly the Istituto Agrario di San Michele all'Adige (IASMA), is an agrarian institution and wine academy located in Trentino in north-east Italy. It was founded in 1874, when the Tyrolean Diet at Innsbruck decided to open an agrarian school and research station at San Michele all'Adige, with the aim of improving agricultural practice in Tyrol. The Institute has been located within the premises of former Augustinian monastery of San Michele then abandoned due to its secularization in 1807. The lombardo-venetian enologist Edmund Mach was the academy's first director and the institute developed a reputation for work in viticulture and enology.

Its mission today is to provide agricultural education, training and consultancy, and to conduct research and experimentation with the aim of "promoting cultural and socio-economic growth in the agricultural sector and at developing the forestry and agro-alimentary systems, with particular regard for the environment and the safeguard of the territory of the Trentino region". There is also a farm, devoted to grape and apple production, a wine cellar and a distillery.

== Research ==
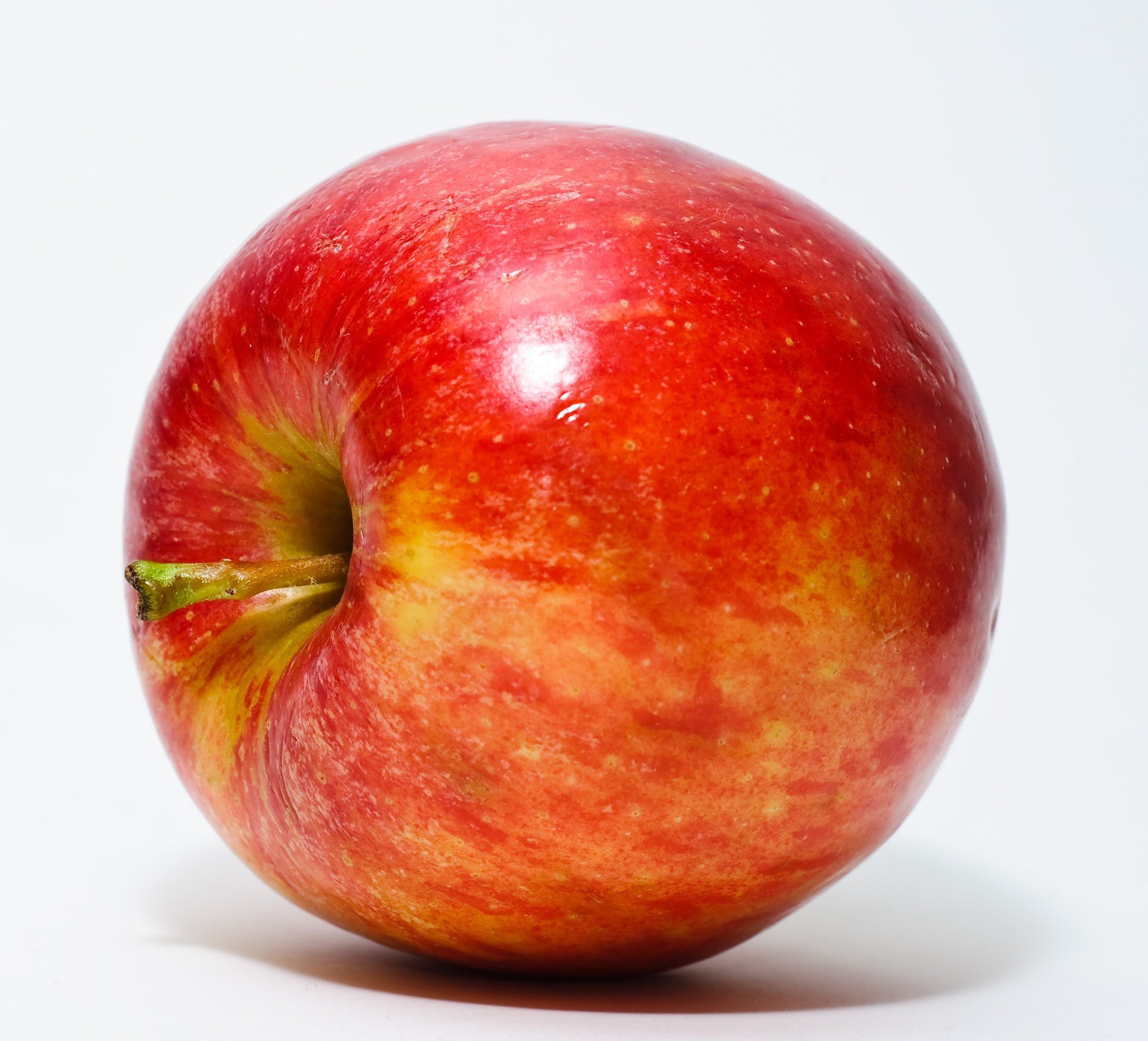
Pheno-genetic improvement of apple

The institute is home of Italy's most extensive ampelographic collection of grape specimens including both indigenous Italian varieties as well as grapes varieties from around the world. The academy conduct wide scale research into various areas of interest to Italian viticulture and winemaking including cataloging the DNA profile and genomic of grape varieties, studying the analysis of wine aromas and flavors as well the role of phenolic compounds in wine. In 2007 Velasco et al. completed a 6.5x draft genome of the Pinot Noir clone ENTAV 115 and uncovered a significant number of genes which they purport to encode disease resistance elements.

Another major area of research for the Foundation is the pheno-genetic improvement of apples (their organoleptic qualities: taste-color-shape-crunchiness-preservation, etc.) and apple trees' architecture (such as output, columnarity, self-cleaning and pest/disease resistance in order to reduce the use of pesticides). All of this obtained by classical plant breeding supported by molecular breeding: DNA sequencing and analysis.

== Recent discoveries ==
In the early 21st century, DNA research by José Vouillamoz of the Istituto Agrario di San Michele all'Adige discovered that ancestors of Sangiovese are most likely the Tuscan grape Ciliegiolo and southern Italian grape Calabrese Montenuovo.

=== Apple genome decodification ===
During 2007 and 2008, apple DNA sequences (around 13 billion sequenced nucleotides) were produced; and in 2009 researchers assembled and reconstructed the gene content and order into the 17 apple chromosomes.

The apple genome decodification, published online by Nature Genetics, was coordinated by the Foundation E. Mach – Ist. Agrario San Michele all'Adige and is of worldwide interest. The data obtained will allow new varieties of apple to be developed more quickly than with classical breeding, resulting in plants with self-defence mechanisms against diseases and insects and which produce healthier and tastier fruits.
