= Aging of wine =

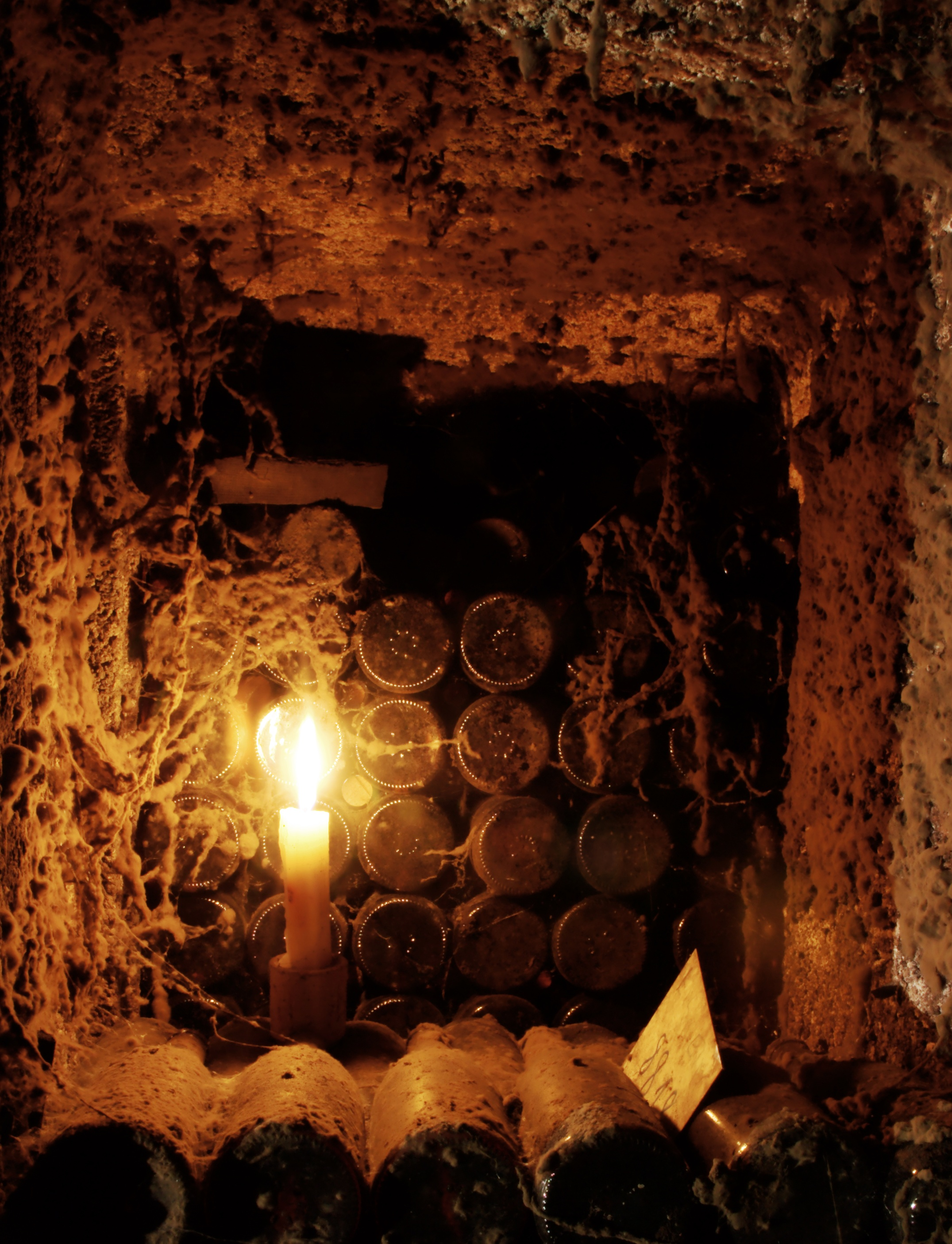
Bottles of wine aging in an underground cellar

Aging improves the quality of some wines. This distinguishes wine from most other consumable goods. While wine is perishable and capable of deteriorating, complex chemical reactions involving a wine's sugars, acids and phenolic compounds (such as tannins) can alter the aroma, color, mouthfeel and taste of the wine in a way that may be more pleasing to the taster. The ability of a wine to age is influenced by many factors including grape variety, vintage, viticultural practices, wine region and winemaking style. The condition that the wine is kept in after bottling can also influence how well a wine ages and may require significant time and financial investment. The quality of an aged wine varies significantly bottle by bottle, depending on the conditions under which it was stored and the condition of the bottle and cork. Thus it is said that rather than good old vintages, there are good old bottles. There is a significant mystique around the aging of wine, as its chemistry was not understood for a long time, and old wines are often sold for extraordinary prices. However, the vast majority of wine is not aged, and even wine that is aged is rarely aged for long; it is estimated that 90% of wine is meant to be consumed within a year of production, and 99% of wine within 5 years.

== History ==
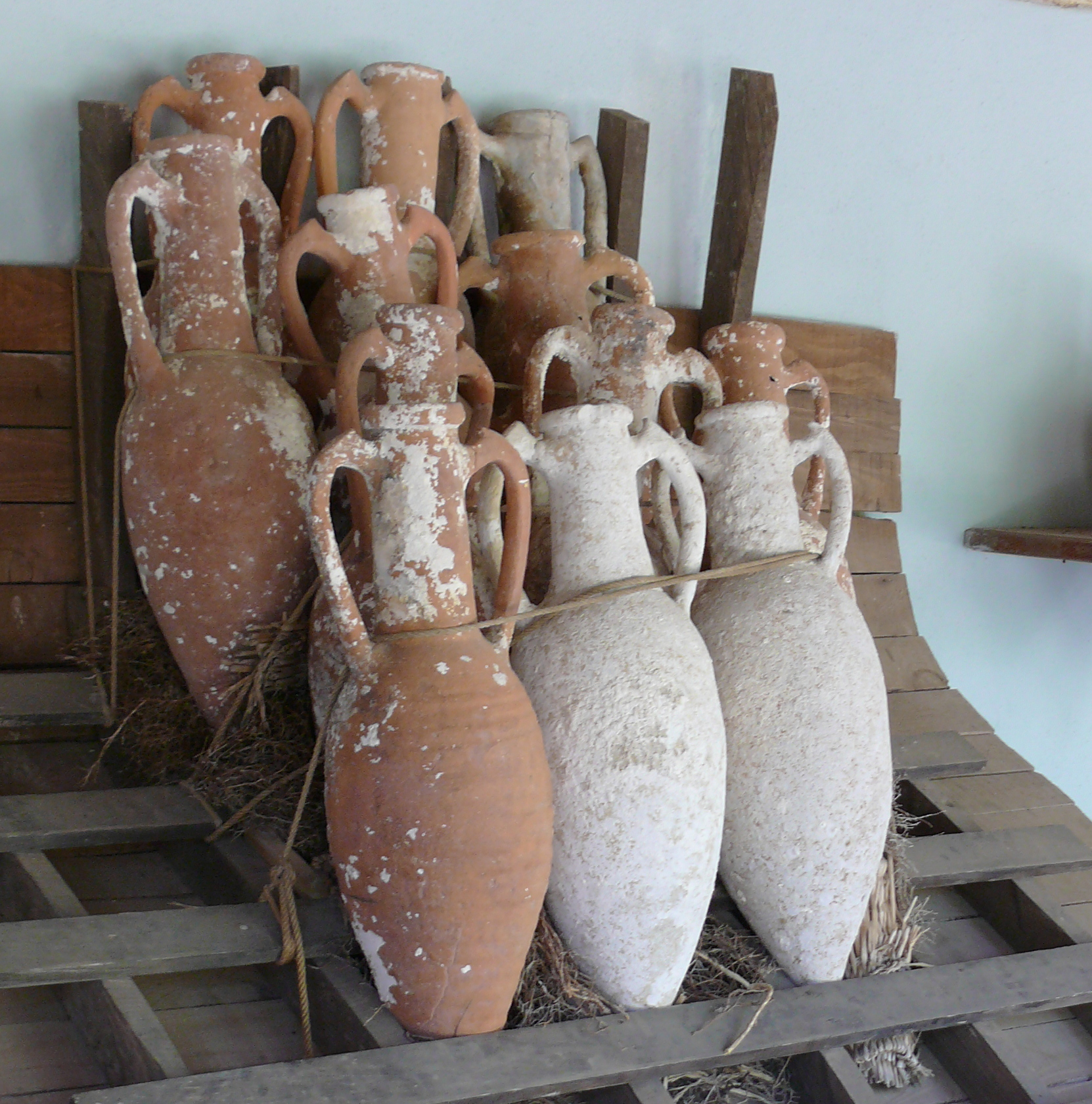
During antiquity, amphorae like these were used to store wine and sealing wax made it possible to age the wine.

The Ancient Greeks and Romans were aware of the potential of aged wines. In Greece, early examples of dried "straw wines" were noted for their ability to age due to their high sugar contents. These wines were stored in sealed amphorae and kept for many years. In Rome, the most sought after wines – Falernian and Surrentine – were prized for their ability to age for decades. The Greek physician Galen wrote that the "taste" of aged wine was desirable and that this could be accomplished by heating or smoking the wine, though, in Galen's opinion, these artificially aged wines were not as healthy to consume as naturally aged wines.

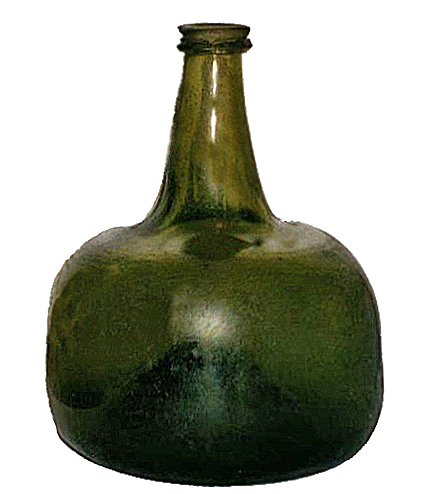
Bottles with cork closure reinvented the process of wine aging.

Following the Fall of the Roman Empire, appreciation for aged wine was virtually non-existent. Most of the wines produced in northern Europe were light bodied, pale in color and with low alcohol. These wines did not have much aging potential and barely lasted a few months before they rapidly deteriorated into vinegar. The older a wine got the cheaper its price became as merchants eagerly sought to rid themselves of aging wine. By the 16th century, sweeter and more alcoholic wines (like Malmsey and Sack) were being made in the Mediterranean and gaining attention for their aging ability. Similarly, Riesling from Germany with its combination of acidity and sugar were also demonstrating their ability to age. In the 17th century, two innovations occurred that radically changed the wine industry's view on aging. One was the development of the cork and bottle which again allowed producers to package and store wine in a virtually air-tight environment. The second was the growing popularity of fortified wines such as Port, Madeira and Sherries. The added alcohol was found to act as a preservative, allowing wines to survive long sea voyages to England, The Americas and the East Indies. The English, in particular, were growing in their appreciation of aged wines like Port and Claret from Bordeaux. Demand for matured wines had a pronounced effect on the wine trade. For producers, the cost and space of storing barrels or bottles of wine was prohibitive so a merchant class evolved with warehouses and the finances to facilitate aging wines for a longer period of time. In regions like Bordeaux, Porto and Burgundy, this situation dramatically increased the balance of power towards the merchant classes.

== Aging potential ==
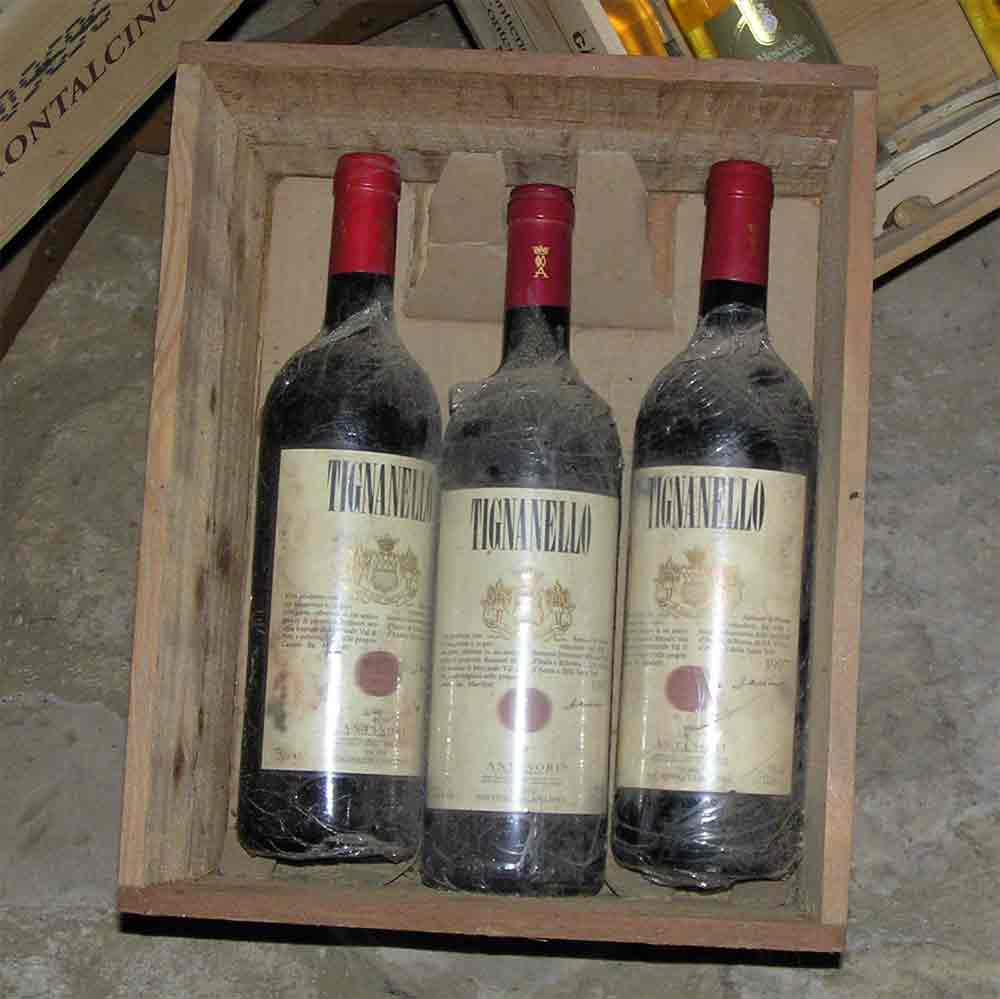
The Italian wine Tignanello is a blend of Sangiovese, Cabernet Sauvignon and Cabernet franc – varieties which usually have aging potential.

There is a widespread misconception that wine always improves with age, or that wine improves with extended aging, or that aging potential is an indicator of good wine. Some authorities state that more wine is consumed too old than too young. Aging changes wine, but does not categorically improve it or worsen it. Fruitiness deteriorates rapidly, decreasing markedly after only 6 months in the bottle. Due to the cost of storage, it is not economical to age cheap wines, but many varieties of wine do not benefit from aging, regardless of the quality. Experts vary on precise numbers, but typically state that only 5–10% of wine improves after 1 year, and only 1% improves after 5–10 years.

In general, wines with a low pH (such as pinot noir and Sangiovese) have a greater capability of aging. With red wines, a high level of flavor compounds, such as phenolics (most notably tannins), will increase the likelihood that a wine will be able to age. Wines with high levels of phenols include Cabernet Sauvignon, Nebbiolo and Syrah. The white wines with the longest aging potential tend to be those with a high amount of extract and acidity (such as Riesling). The acidity in white wines, acting as a preservative, has a role similar to that of tannins in red wines. The process of making white wines, which includes little to no skin contact, means that white wines have a significantly lower amount of phenolic compounds, though barrel fermentation and oak aging can impart some phenols. Similarly, the minimal skin contact with rosé wine limits their aging potential.

After aging at the winery most wood-aged ports, sherries, vins doux naturels, vins de liqueur, basic level ice wines, and sparkling wines are bottled when the producer feels that they are ready to be consumed. These wines are ready to drink upon release and will not benefit much from aging. Vintage ports and other bottled-aged ports and sherries will benefit from some additional aging.

Champagne and other sparkling wines are infrequently aged, and frequently have no vintage year (no vintage, NV), but vintage champagne may be aged. Aged champagne has traditionally been a peculiarly British affectation, and thus has been referred to as le goût anglais "the English taste", though this term also refers to a level of champagne sweetness. In principle champagne has aging potential, due to the acidity, and aged champagne has increased in popularity in the United States since the 1996 vintage. A few French winemakers have advocated aging champagne, most notably René Collard (1921–2009). In 2009, a 184-year-old bottle of Perrier-Jouët was opened and tasted, still drinkable, with notes of "truffles and caramel", according to the experts.

== Factors and influences ==
=== Wine constituents ===
The ratio of sugars, acids and phenolics to water is a key determination of how well a wine can age. The less water in the grapes prior to harvest, the more likely the resulting wine will have some aging potential. Grape variety, climate, vintage and viticultural practice come into play here. Grape varieties with thicker skins, from a dry growing season where little irrigation was used and yields were kept low will have less water and a higher ratio of sugar, acids and phenolics. The process of making Eisweins, where water is removed from the grape during pressing as frozen ice crystals, has a similar effect of decreasing the amount of water and increasing aging potential.

In winemaking, the duration of maceration or skin contact will influence how much phenolic compounds are leached from skins into the wine. Pigmented tannins, anthocyanins, colloids, tannin-polysaccharides and tannin-proteins not only influence a wine's resulting color but also act as preservatives. During fermentation adjustment to a wine's acid levels can be made with wines with lower pH having more aging potential. Exposure to oak either during fermentation or after (during barrel aging) will introduce more phenolic compounds to the wines. Prior to bottling, excessive fining or filtering of the wine could strip the wine of some phenolic solids and may lessen a wine's ability to age.

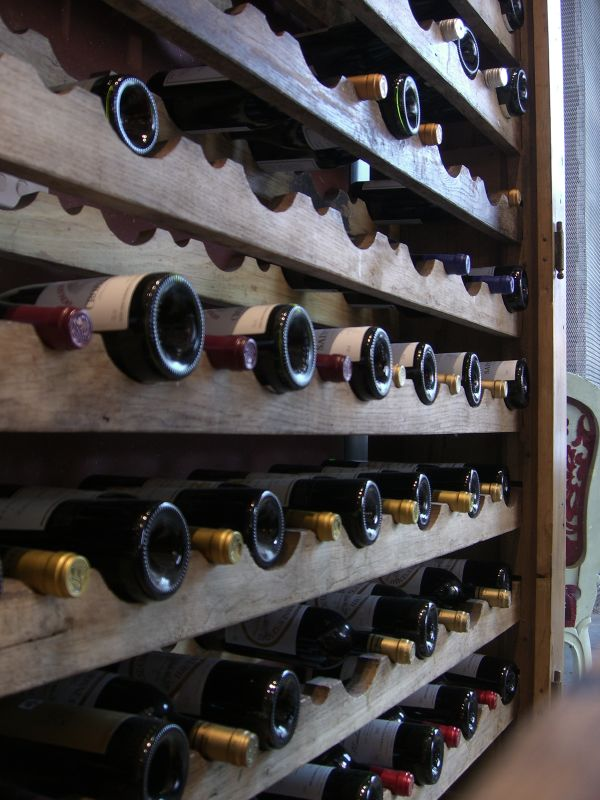
Storage conditions can influence a wine's aging ability.

=== Storage factors ===
The storage condition of the bottled wine will influence a wine's aging. Vibrations and heat fluctuations can hasten a wine's deterioration and cause adverse effect on the wines. In general, a wine has a greater potential to develop complexity and more aromatic bouquet if it is allowed to age slowly in a relatively cool environment. The lower the temperature, the more slowly a wine develops. On average, the rate of chemical reactions in wine double with each 18 °F (10 °C) increase in temperature. Wine expert Karen MacNeil recommends keeping wine intended for aging in a cool area with a constant temperature around 55 °F (13 °C). Wine can be stored at temperatures as high as 69 °F (20 °C) without long term negative effect. Professor Cornelius Ough of the University of California, Davis believes that wine could be exposed to temperatures as high as 120 °F (49 °C) for a few hours and not be damaged. However, most experts believe that extreme temperature fluctuations (such as repeated transferring of a wine from a warm room to a cool refrigerator) would be detrimental to the wine. The ultra-violet rays of direct sunlight should also be avoided because of the free radicals that can develop in the wine and result in premature oxidation. Wines packaged in large format bottles, such as magnums and 3 liter Jeroboams, seem to age more slowly than wines packaged in regular 750 ml bottles or half bottles. This may be because of the greater proportion of oxygen exposed to the wine during the bottle process. The advent of alternative wine closures to cork, such as screw caps and synthetic corks have opened up recent discussions on the aging potential of wines sealed with these alternative closures. Currently there are no conclusive results and the topic is the subject of ongoing research.

=== Bottling factors ===
==== Bottle shock ====
One of the short-term aging needs of wine is a period where the wine is considered "sick" due to the trauma and volatility of the bottling experience. During bottling the wine is exposed to some oxygen which causes a domino effect of chemical reactions with various components of the wine. The time it takes for the wine to settle down and have the oxygen fully dissolve and integrate with the wine is considered its period of "bottle shock". During this time the wine could taste drastically different from how it did prior to bottling or how it will taste after the wine has settled. While many modern bottling lines try to treat the wine as gently as possible and utilize inert gases to minimize the amount of oxygen exposure, all wine goes through some period of bottle shock. The length of this period will vary with each individual wine.

=== Dumb phase ===
During the course of aging, a wine may slip into a "dumb phase" where its aromas and flavors are very muted. In Bordeaux this phase is called the age ingrat or "difficult age" and is likened to a teenager going through adolescence. The cause or length of time that this "dumb phase" will last is not yet fully understood and seems to vary from bottle to bottle.

== Effects on wine ==
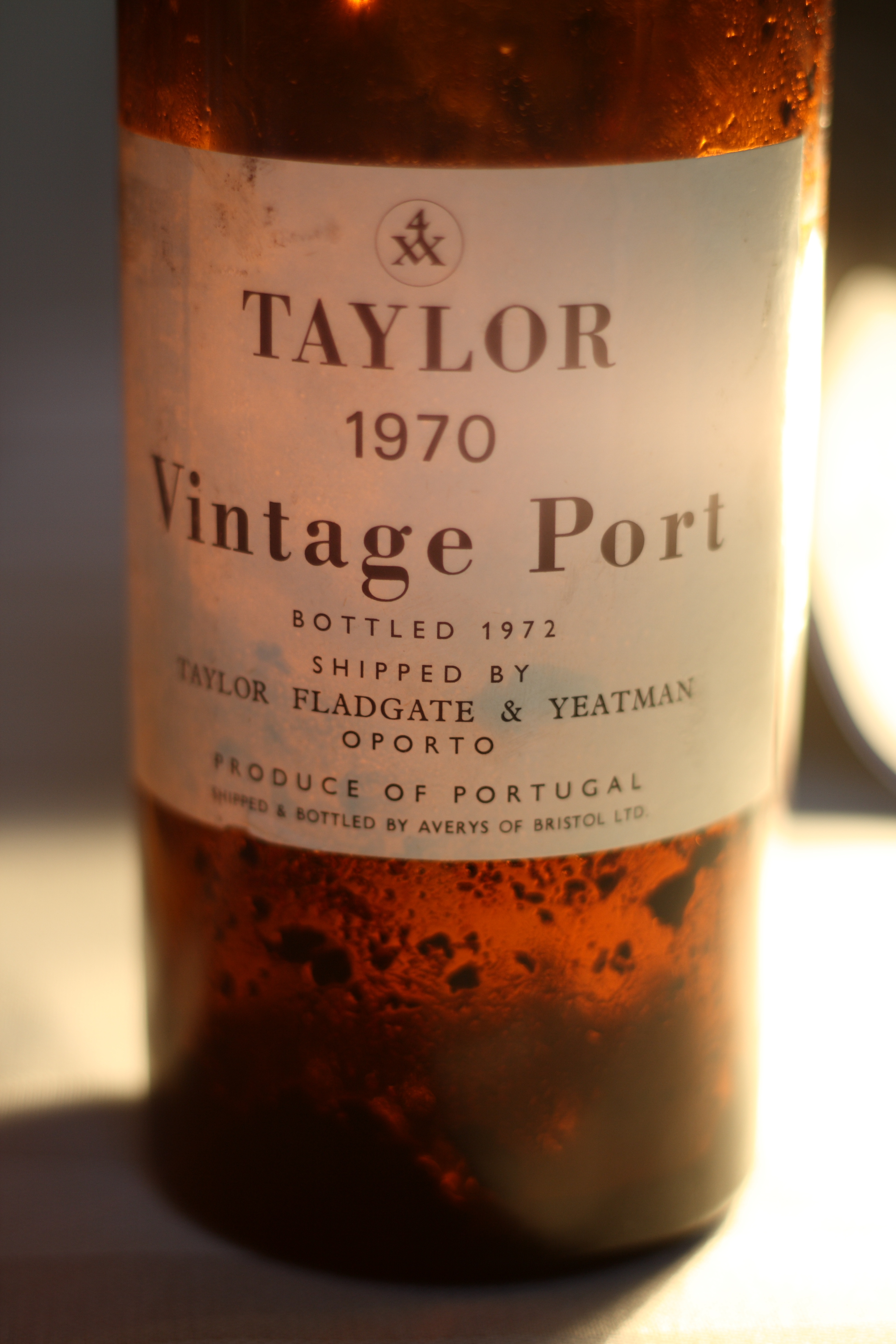
As vintage Port matures, sediments develop in the wine that are often left in the bottle when the wine is decanted.

As red wine ages, the harsh tannins of its youth gradually give way to a softer mouthfeel. An inky dark color will eventually lose its depth of color and begin to appear orange at the edges, and eventually turn brown. These changes occur due to the complex chemical reactions of the phenolic compounds of the wine. In processes that begin during fermentation and continue after bottling, these compounds bind together and aggregate. Eventually these particles reach a certain size where they are too large to stay suspended in the solution and precipitate out. The presence of visible sediment in a bottle will usually indicate a mature wine. The resulting wine, with this loss of tannins and pigment, will have a paler color and taste softer, less astringent. The sediment, while harmless, can have an unpleasant taste and is often separated from the wine by decanting.

During the aging process, the perception of a wine's acidity may change even though the total measurable amount of acidity is more or less constant throughout a wine's life. This is due to the esterification of the acids, combining with alcohols in complex array to form esters. In addition to making a wine taste less acidic, these esters introduce a range of possible aromas. Eventually the wine may age to a point where other components of the wine (such as a tannins and fruit) are less noticeable themselves, which will then bring back a heightened perception of wine acidity. Other chemical processes that occur during aging include the hydrolysis of flavor precursors which detach themselves from glucose molecules and introduce new flavor notes in the older wine and aldehydes become oxidized. The interaction of certain phenolics develops what is known as tertiary aromas which are different from the primary aromas that are derived from the grape and during fermentation.

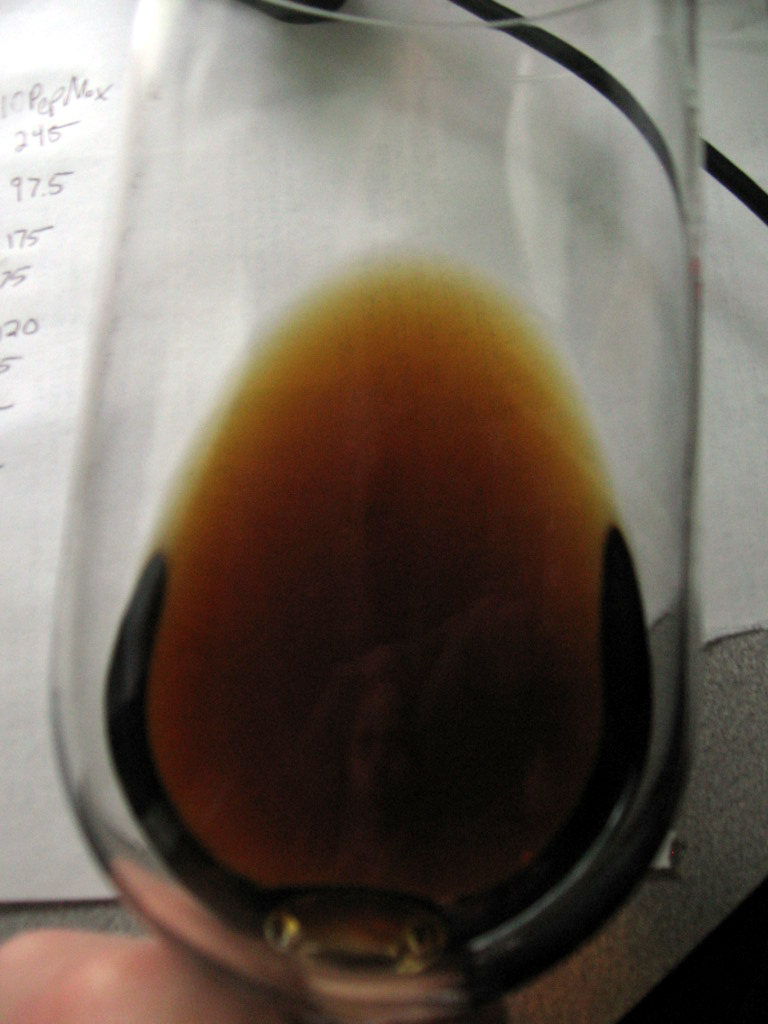
An aged Malmsey Madeira shows the color change that white wines go through as they age.

As a wine starts to mature, its bouquet will become more developed and multi-layered. While a taster may be able to pick out a few fruit notes in a young wine, a more complex wine will have several distinct fruit, floral, earthy, mineral and oak derived notes. The lingering finish of a wine will lengthen. Eventually the wine will reach a point of maturity, when it is said to be at its "peak". This is the point when the wine has the maximum amount of complexity, most pleasing mouthfeel and softening of tannins and has not yet started to decay. When this point will occur is not yet predictable and can vary from bottle to bottle. If a wine is aged for too long, it will start to descend into decrepitude where the fruit tastes hollow and weak while the wine's acidity becomes dominant.

The natural esterification that takes place in wines and other alcoholic beverages during the aging process is an example of acid-catalysed esterification. Over time, the acidity of the acetic acid and tannins in an aging wine will catalytically protonate other organic acids (including acetic acid itself), encouraging ethanol to react as a nucleophile. As a result, ethyl acetate – the ester of ethanol and acetic acid – is the most abundant ester in wines. Other combinations of organic alcohols (such as phenol-containing compounds) and organic acids lead to a variety of different esters in wines, contributing to their different flavours, smells and tastes. Of course, when compared to sulfuric acid conditions, the acid conditions in a wine are mild, so yield is low (often in tenths or hundredths of a percentage point by volume) and take years for ester to accumulate.

== Coates' Law of Maturity ==
Coates' Law of Maturity is a principle used in wine tasting relating to the aging ability of wine. Developed by the British Master of Wine, Clive Coates, the principle states that a wine will remain at its peak (or optimal) drinking quality for a duration of time that is equal to the time of maturation required to reach its optimal quality. During the aging of a wine certain flavors, aromas and textures appear and fade. Rather than developing and fading in unison, these traits each operate on a unique path and time line. The principle allows for the subjectivity of individual tastes because it follows the logic that positive traits that appeal to one particular wine taster will continue to persist along the principle's guideline while for another taster these traits might not be positive and therefore not applicable to the guideline. Wine expert Tom Stevenson has noted that there is logic in Coates' principle and that he has yet to encounter an anomaly or wine that debunks it.

=== Example ===
An example of the principle in practice would be a wine that someone acquires when it is 9 years of age, but finds dull. A year later the drinker finds this wine very pleasing in texture, aroma and mouthfeel. Under the Coates Law of Maturity the wine will continue to be drunk at an optimal maturation for that drinker until it has reached 20 years of age at which time those positive traits that the drinker perceives will start to fade.

== Artificial aging ==
There is a long history of using artificial means to try to accelerate the natural aging process. In Ancient Rome a smoke chamber known as a fumarium was used to enhance the flavor of wine through artificial aging. Amphorae were placed in the chamber, which was built on top of a heated hearth, in order to impart a smoky flavor in the wine that also seemed to sharpen the acidity. The wine would sometimes come out of the fumarium with a paler color just like aged wine. Modern winemaking techniques like micro-oxygenation can have the side effect of artificially aging the wine. In the production of Madeira and rancio wines, the wines are deliberately exposed to excessive temperatures to accelerate the maturation of the wine. Other techniques used to artificially age wine (with inconclusive results on their effectiveness) include shaking the wine, exposing it to radiation, magnetism or ultra-sonic waves. More recently, experiments with artificial aging through high-voltage electricity have produced results above the remaining techniques, as assessed by a panel of wine tasters. Some artificial wine-aging gadgets include the "Clef du Vin", which is a metallic object that is dipped into wine and purportedly ages the wine one year for every second of dipping. The product has received mixed reviews from wine commentators. Several wineries have begun aging finished wine bottles undersea; ocean aging is thought to accelerate natural aging reactions as a function of depth (pressure).

=== Underwater aging of wine ===
The underwater aging of wine (also called sea ageing) is a method of maturing wine in which sealed bottles, barrels, or crates are submerged in the sea, a lake, or another body of water instead of being stored in a conventional wine cellar. Advocates argue that the constant low temperature, complete darkness, elevated hydrostatic pressure, and, for sparkling wine, the gentle motion of currents create ageing conditions that differ from a land-based cellar. Interest in the practice grew after chance discoveries of well-preserved Champagne in shipwrecks, and it has since become a small but growing commercial sector, with dedicated underwater-ageing operators active off the coasts of Spain, Croatia, Italy, Argentina, France and elsewhere.

The concept was inspired by chance discoveries of shipwrecked wine. In 1916, a German U-boat sank a Swedish schooner carrying bottles of 1907 Heidsieck Champagne intended for the Russian imperial court; when divers recovered part of the cargo in 1998, the wine was found to be still drinkable. In July 2010, divers discovered 168 bottles of Champagne, produced by the houses of Veuve Clicquot, Heidsieck, and Juglar, in a shipwreck near the Åland Islands in the Baltic Sea at a depth of about 50 metres, in what was later estimated to be roughly 170-year-old wine. Chemical and sensory analysis of the surviving liquid, later published in the Proceedings of the National Academy of Sciences, found that the cold (2–4 °C), dark, and low-salinity seabed conditions had preserved the wine's aroma compounds in an unusually fresh, youthful state. The same analysis also found much higher sugar levels and trace amounts of arsenic compared with modern Champagne, reflecting nineteenth-century winemaking and clarifying practices. The find prompted Veuve Clicquot, whose bottles were among those recovered, to begin its own long-term experiment, laying 350 bottles in an underwater "cellar" at a depth of 40 metres in the Baltic Sea in 2014 to compare their evolution with bottles aged conventionally in its chalk cellars (crayères) in Reims. Other early commercial ventures followed similar publicity around shipwreck finds: Spanish winemaker Raúl Pérez began submerging Albariño off the Rías Baixas coast in 2003, and California's Mira Winery began ageing Cabernet Sauvignon in Charleston Harbor in 2008. In 2009, Ligurian producer Bisson began making spumante underwater, and in 2011 a barrel of red wine from Château Larrivet Haut-Brion was submerged for six months in Arcachon Bay as a controlled comparison with a barrel aged in the cellar. Spain's Crusoe Treasure, which describes itself as the first underwater winery, launched in 2010.

Bottles are typically packed into cages or crates and lowered to depths of roughly 10 to 60 metres, where they remain from several months to several years before retrieval. Companies offering underwater ageing as a service to wineries. By 2023, industry estimates suggested that several hundred thousand bottles were being aged underwater worldwide each year, up from roughly 100,000 in 2021.

Proponents of underwater ageing cite several distinctive features of the marine environment: a constant temperature generally cooler and more stable than a typical cellar; total darkness; hydrostatic pressure several times greater than at the surface; and, for sparkling wines, continuous gentle agitation from currents, which is said to keep sediment in suspension and reduce the need for riddling and disgorgement. Some producers have compared the combined effect of constant temperature and pressure to that of a hyperbaric chamber.

Several peer-reviewed studies published in the 2020s have compared the chemical evolution of wines aged underwater with wines aged conventionally in a cellar. A 2024 study in European Food Research and Technology submerged white, rosé, and red wines for six months at a depth of 52 metres and found some differences in colour and volatile compounds relative to cellar-aged controls, but no significant differences in acidity, ethanol content, or pH. A separate 2024 study in the journal Foods, comparing Merlot and Sangiovese aged underwater and in a cellar, reported a gradual decline in total phenols, anthocyanins, and sulfur dioxide under both conditions, and concluded that underwater ageing did not significantly alter the wines' fundamental chemical characteristics compared with cellar ageing over the periods studied. A 2025 study in Foods that submerged a red wine in spring water for up to 36 months found underwater ageing had a more pronounced effect on dissolved oxygen levels and anthocyanin content than on phenolic profile or colour. Research on wine-based liqueurs similarly found that twelve months of underwater ageing was associated with slower loss of phenolic compounds and higher anthocyanin retention than cellar ageing, attributed to the low-oxygen conditions of the seabed.

== See also ==
- Ullage
- Barrel-aged beer
