= Ciliegiolo =

Variety of grape

- Grape (Vitis)
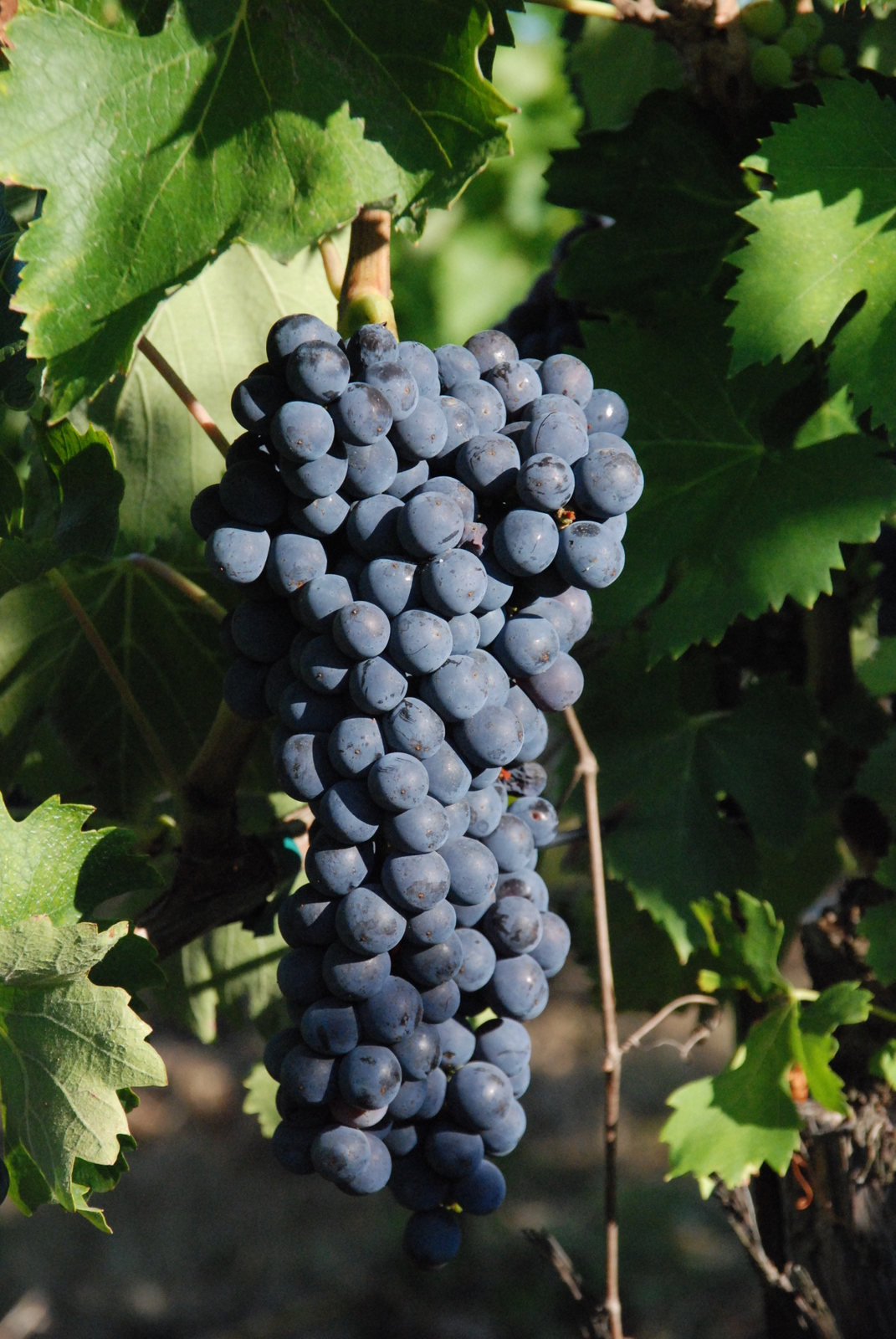
- Cluster of Ciliegiolo
- Color of berry skin: Noir
- Species: Vitis vinifera
- Origin: Italy
- Notable regions: Tuscany, Umbria
- VIVC number: 2660

Ciliegiolo is a variety of red wine grape from Italy, named after the Italian for 'cherry'. It is a minor component of traditional blends such as Chianti, but interest has revived in recent years. In Umbria it is made into a light quaffing wine, while in Tuscany it is made into a bigger, more structured style.

== Pedigree and relationship to Sangiovese ==
A study published in 2007 using DNA typing tentatively identified the Ciliegiolo and Calabrese di Montenuovo as the parents of Sangiovese, but this was immediately disputed by another study published the same year which claimed Ciliegiolo was the offspring of Sangiovese rather than the other way around. Thus, the exact nature of the genetic relationship (but not the presence of a close relationship) between Cilieglio and Sangiovese remains disputed.

Some legend claims that Ciliegiolo came to Italy from Spain, but the genetic link between Ciliegiolo and Sangiovese is practically impossible to reconcile with a Spanish origin.

== Distribution and wines ==
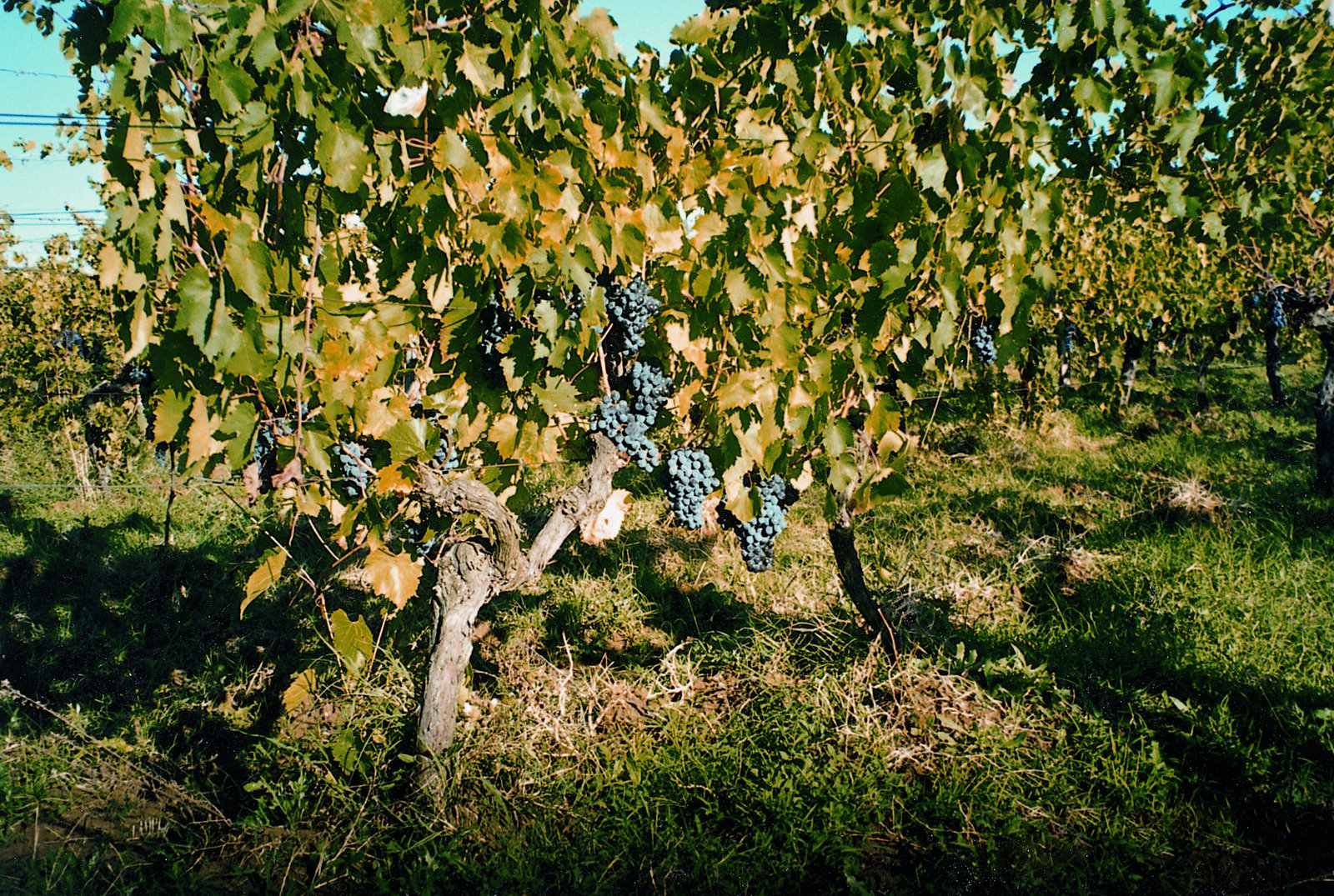
Ciliegiolo vines.

=== Italy ===
There are around 5000 hectares of Ciliegiolo in Italy, a figure that has been in steady decline. It is used in the wines from Torgiano Rosso Riserva, Parrina, Colli Lucchesi, Chianti, Val di Cornia, Golfo del Tigullio and Colli di Luni. It's possible to find ciliegiolo grapes as well in Sicily. The label is "Dedalo". It is a product from Fiore winery in Butera area.

== Vine and viticulture ==
Ciliegiolo is not an easy grape to grow, suffering at times from shatter. The berries average 19.2 mm long, 19.0 mm wide, and weigh 3.68 g.

== Synonyms ==
Aleatico di Spagna, Ciliegino, Ciliegiolo di Spagna, Ciliegiuolo and Ciriegiuolo Dolce.

== See also ==
- Sangiovese
