= Aleatico =

Variety of grape

- Grape (Vitis)
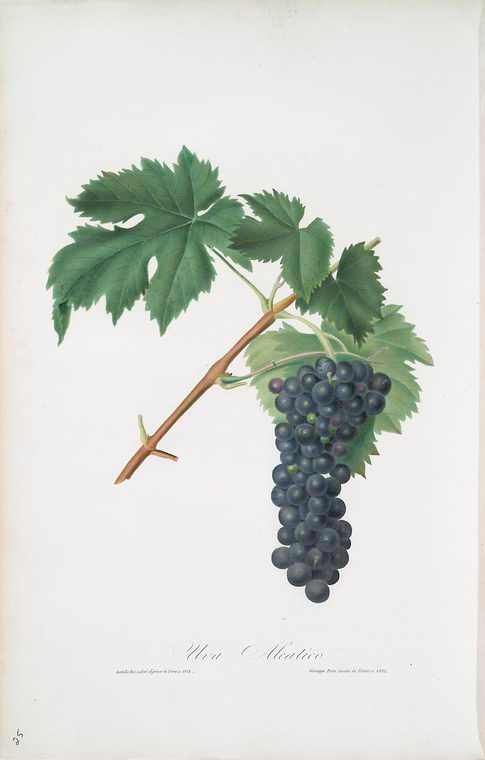
- Color of berry skin: Black
- Species: Vitis vinifera
- Also called: Red Moscatel and other synonyms
- Origin: Italy
- Notable regions: Tuscany, Lazio, Chile, New South Wales, California
- Notable wines: Aleatico di Portoferraio
- VIVC number: 259

Aleatico is a red Italian wine grape variety. It is notable for being the primary grape in the cult wine Aleatico di Portoferraio made in Elba. In Chile is known as Red Moscatel. The grape has also been cultivated at Mudgee in New South Wales and California.

== History ==
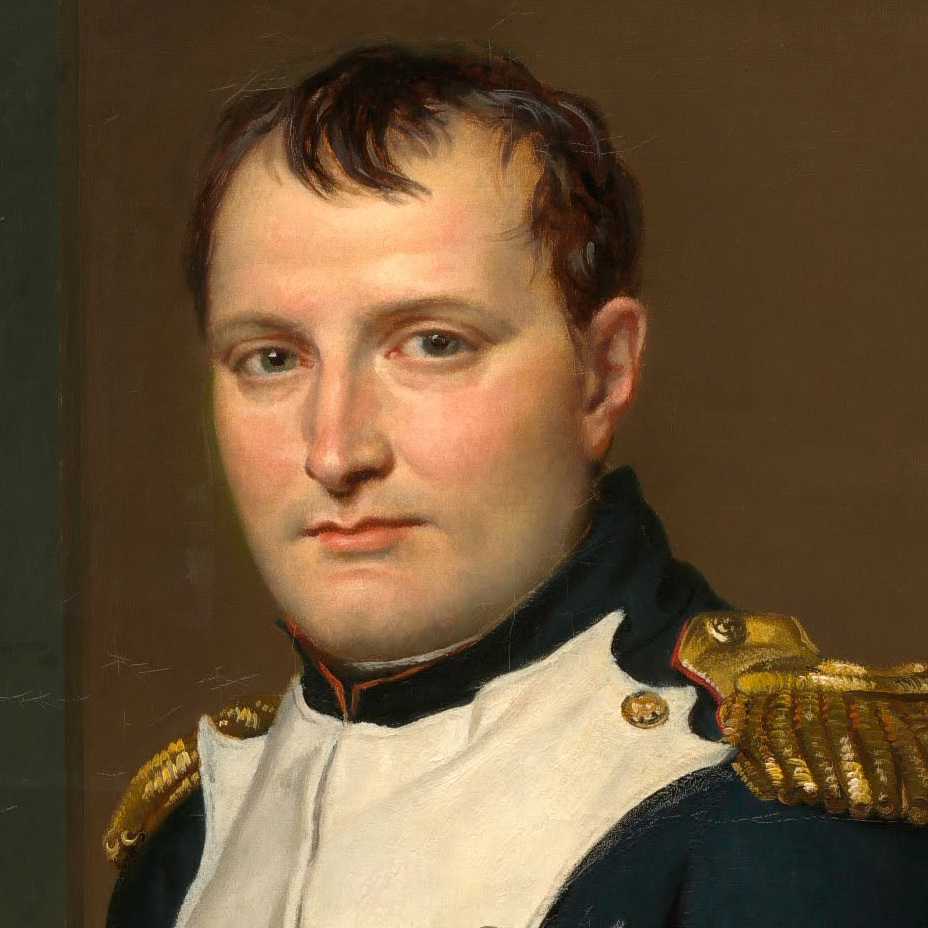
During his exile in Elba, wine made from Aleatico was reportedly a favorite drink of Napoleon.

Ampelographers suspect that Aleatico may be a dark-skinned variant of the French wine grape Muscat blanc à Petits Grains, which is a member of the extensive Muscat family of grapes, believed to be the oldest family of Vitis vinifera in the world. DNA profiling conducted at Istituto Agrario di San Michele all’Adige suggests that the relationship between Muscat blanc à Petits Grains and Aleatico may be that of a parent-offspring rather than just a mutation. Similar theories posit that the grape is descended from Tuscan Muscat Noir. Historians also disagree on Aleatico's exact origins: the vine may have been brought to Italy by the ancient Greeks or is native to the southern Italian region of Apulia.

During the 14th century, the Italian wine writer Pietro Crescenzi wrote of wine being produced in central Italy from the "Livatica" grape, today believed to be Aleatico. In Elba, there is a long history of producing dessert wines from Aleatico. During his exile on Elba, the Aleatico wines of the island became a favorite drink of Napoleon. He was reported to have said that they were his only consolation during this time.

== Wine regions ==
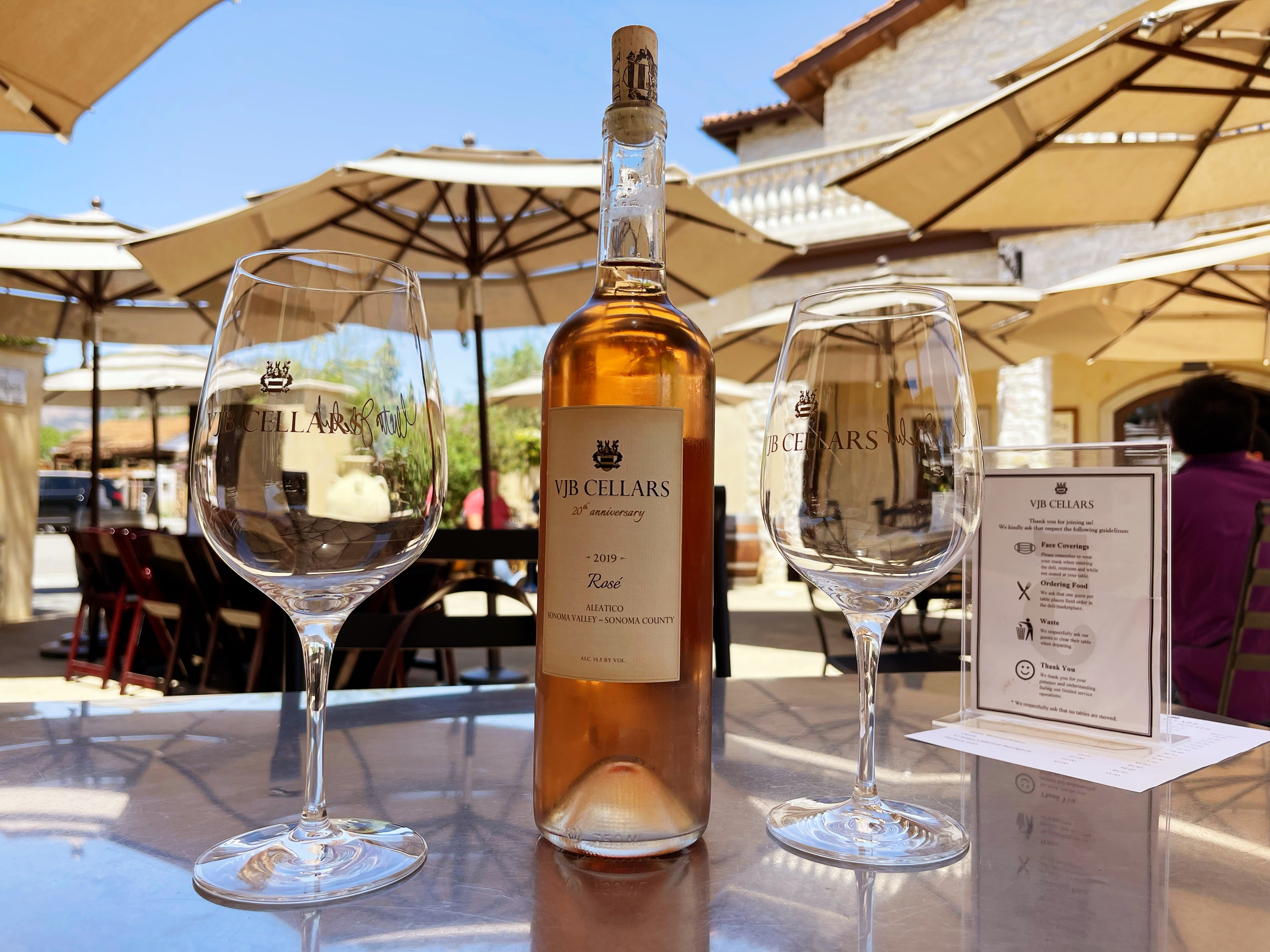
A rosé of Aleatico from VJB Cellars in Kenwood, California

Aleatico is most commonly found in Italy, Tuscany (primarily in Elba), Lazio, Umbria, Piedmont, Apulia. Smaller plantings can be found in the regions of Marche, Abruzzo and Sicily. Outside of Italy the grape is grown in Azerbaijan, Australia, California, Chile, Corsica (though not permitted in any AOC-authorized wines), Kazakhstan and Uzbekistan.

For most of the 20th century, Italian plantings of the grape had been in decline, but recent years have seen a spike of interest in the variety. In Elba there is a Denominazione di Origine Controllata e Garantita, the Aleatico dell’Elba Passito DOCG dedicated to the production of passito-style wines made from Aleatico. Under Italy's appellation system, very few dessert wines receive the highest designation of DOCG level, making the Aleatico dell’Elba Passito a rarity in Italy.

In Piedmont is famous "Novello rosso DOC" produced in Colli Tortonesi.

In Lazio, Aleatico is found around Lake Bolsena, where it has its own Denominazione di Origine Controllata region of the Aleatico di Gradoli DOC. This dessert wine is produced from grapes grown on the northwestern hillsides of the lake, which partially overlaps into the Est! Est!! Est!!! di Montefiascone DOC. In Apulia the Aleatico di Puglia DOC exists for this grape.

== Wine styles ==
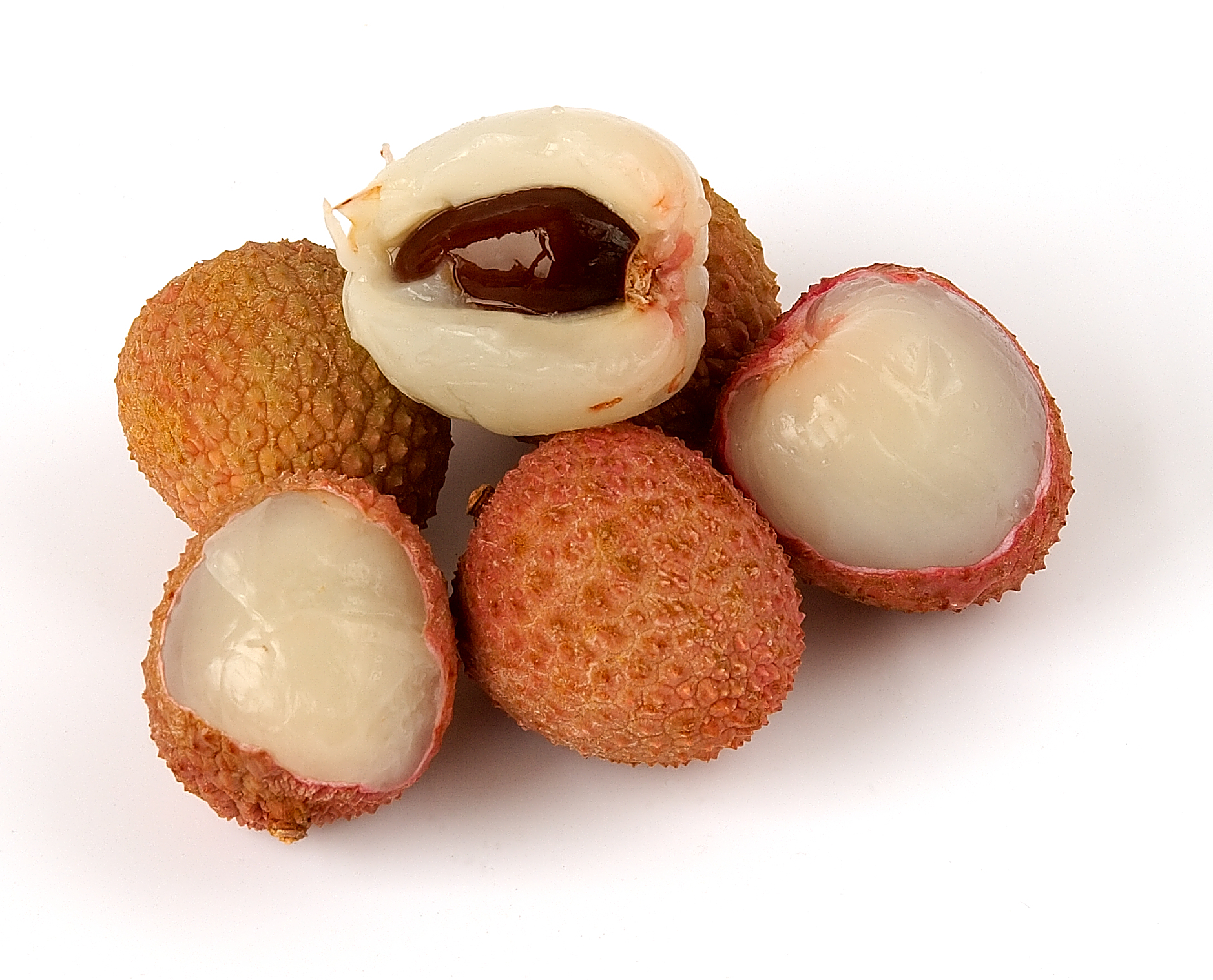
Lychee is an aroma descriptor often attributed to wines made from Aleatico.

Aleatico is often used to produce dessert wines. The grapes may be dried or the wines may be fortified in a liquoroso style. The wines are typically aged at least 6 months prior to release, with Italian wines labeled as "Liquoroso Riserva," requiring three years of aging, at least 2 of them in wood barrels.

Aleatico wines are characterized by the aroma of roses, a trait they share with Muscat blanc à Petits Grains. Other aroma notes commonly include various berry fruits and lychees. Aleatico wines tend to have high alcohol content balanced by the grape's acidity.

== Synonyms and mutations ==
In Chile, the grape is known as Red Moscatel. Rare synonyms include Livatica, Leatico and Agliano. A white mutation known as Aleatico Bianco exists but is infrequently cultivated.
