= Calabrese Montenuovo =

Variety of grape

- Grape (Vitis)
- Species: Vitis vinifera
- Origin: Italy
- Notable regions: Calabria, Campania

Calabrese Montenuovo is an ancient variety of red wine grape from Italy. It was discovered in a vineyard in Calabria and became famous when it was found to be one of the parents of Sangiovese.

== History ==
Little is known about Calabrese Montenuovo, but the link to Sangiovese has prompted considerable research. It is believed to have originated in Calabria, hence the name.

== Wine regions ==
Calabrese Montenuovo was found in a vineyard in Calabria, but similar grapes have since been found at several sites further north, in Campania.

== Viticulture ==
The grapes are red.

== Synonyms ==
Calabrese di Montenuovo. It should not be confused with other grapes that bear the Calabrese name, such as Nero d'Avola.

== See also ==
- Sangiovese
- Ciliegiolo
