= Tignanello =

Wine produced by Antinori

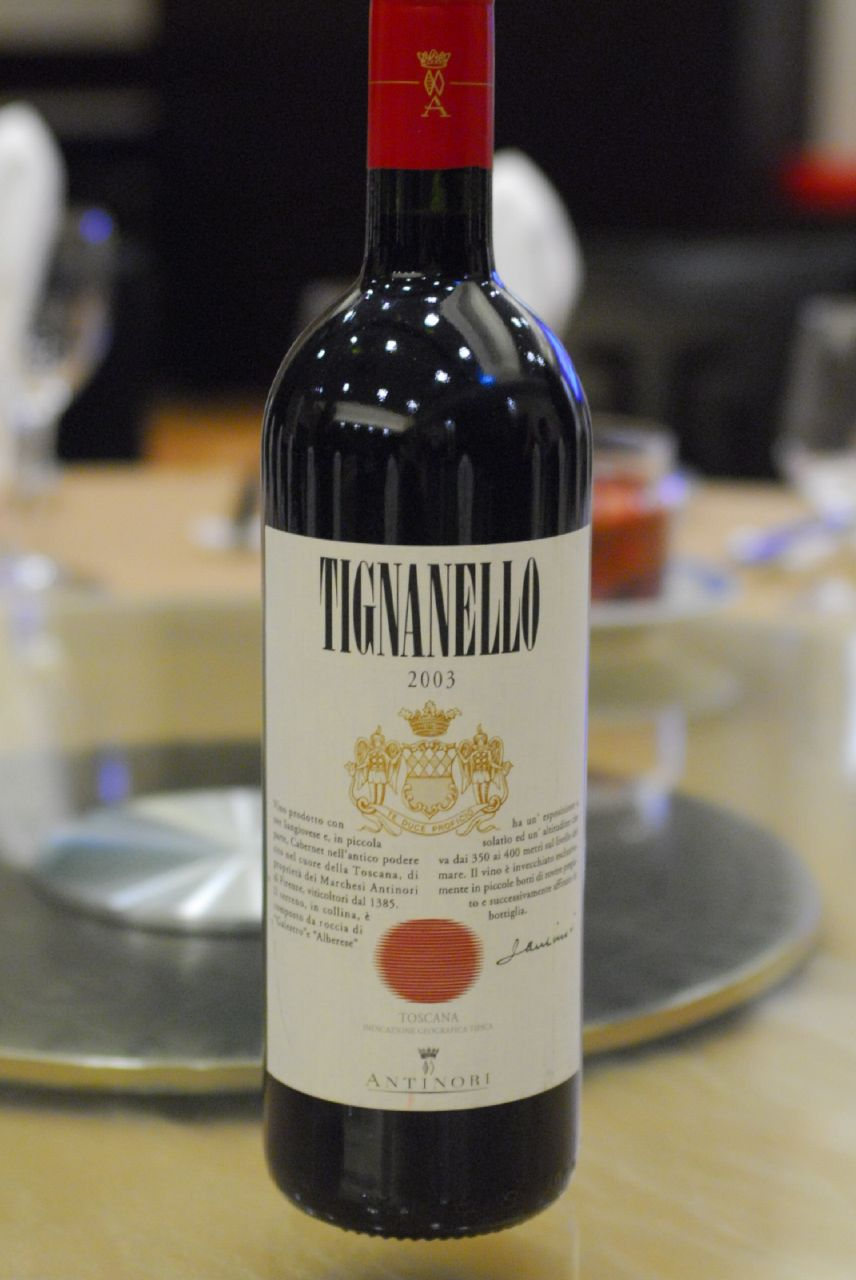
2003 Antinori Tiganello

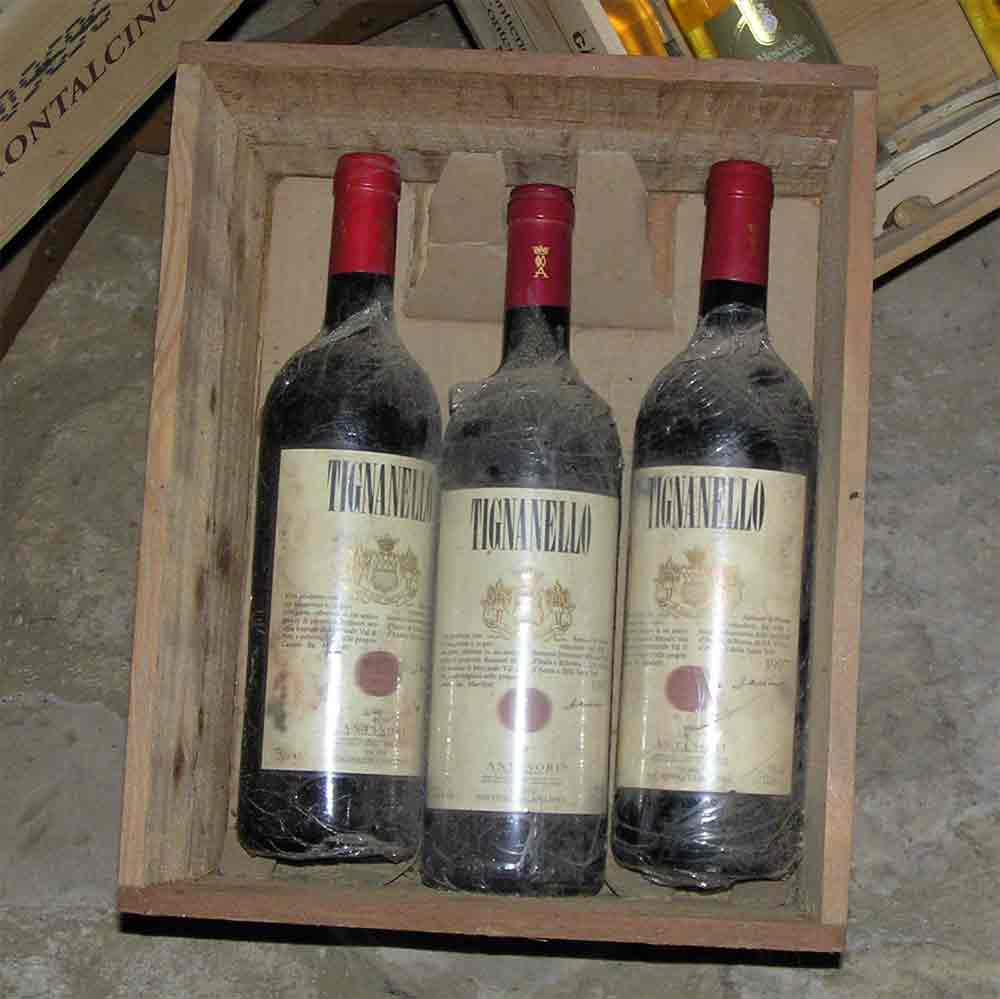
Box of Tignanello bottles

Tignanello is the name that was given in the 1970s to a new wine produced by the ancient house of Antinori (wine producers since 1385) and takes its name from the Tenuta di Tignanello production area in the town of San Casciano in Val di Pesa. Made in 1971, Tignanello was one of the first red wines produced in the area without white grapes, and with the cabernet sauvignon and cabernet franc grape varieties. Tignanello is regarded as an innovative pioneer of the modern Italian top wines, the so-called Super Tuscans, and has decisively shaped Italian viticulture.

== Background ==
Tignanello has won international awards and has been included several times in the international top ten of the magazine Wine Spectator.

The wine was produced for the first time in 1970 by Piero Antinori. It had the characteristic of combining Cabernet Sauvignon and Cabernet Franc grapes with the traditional Sangiovese grapes, and to be aged in a type of barrel called a barrique, leaving the historical disciplinary of the Chianti Classico DOCG wines as established by Bettino Ricasoli. For this reason it lost the designation DOC and retained the only generic indication of table wine until 1994, when it could boast the Indicazione Geografica Tipica designation.

After a first experiment in 1975, the white grapes were completely removed. Now the composition is 80% Sangiovese, 15% Cabernet Sauvignon and 5% Cabernet Franc with an alcohol strength of 13.50%. This ratio between the grapes has been maintained since 1995, with the exception of the period 2001-2006, in which the percentage of Sangiovese rose to 85% at the expense of Cabernet Sauvignon, which was lowered to 10%. In practice it was, together with Sassicaia, the precursor of Super Tuscan wines that have obtained numerous awards all over the world.

== Cultural references ==
- Tignanello wine inspired the naming of the lifestyle blog ("The Tig") that was run by Meghan Markle (before her royal marriage) from 2014-2016.
- The name could derive from the Etruscan divinity Tinia, the equivalent of Zeus.
