= Cabernet blanc =

White wine grape variety

- Grape (Vitis)
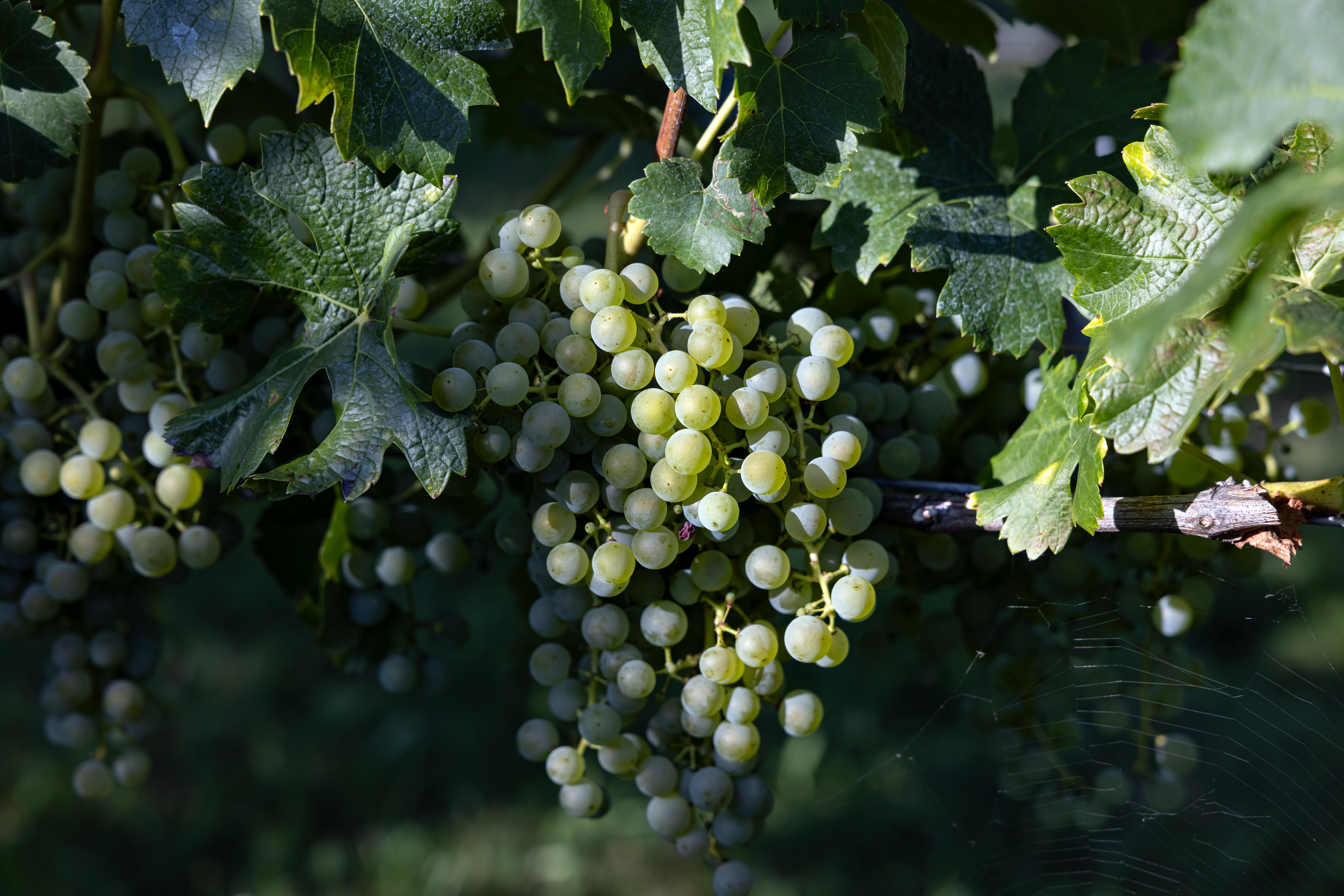
- Species: Vitis vinifera
- VIVC number: 22355

Cabernet blanc is a white German and Swiss wine grape variety that is a crossing of the French wine grape Cabernet Sauvignon and the hybrid grape Regent. The grape was bred by Swiss grape breeder Valentin Blattner in 1991. Cabernet blanc has strong resistance to most grape disease including botrytis bunch rot, downy and powdery mildew and tends to produce loose clusters of small, thick-skinned grape berries which can hang on the vine late into the harvest season to produce dessert wines. Today the grape is found primarily in the Palatinate wine region of Germany with some experimental plantings in Spain and the Netherlands. In France, in the Languedoc, Domaine La Colombette is heavily investing in PIWI grapes. Amongst others the Cabernet Blanc in their cuvée "Au Creux du Nid", is gaining wide acclaim.

The grape is currently not being used for commercial wine production in the United States with American wines labeled as Cabernet blanc or White Cabernet instead being sweet pink-colored blush wines made from early pressing of Cabernet Sauvignon grapes similar to how White Zinfandel is produced from the red Zinfandel grape.

== Pedigree ==
Cabernet blanc is a hybrid crossing of the Vitis vinifera wine grape Cabernet Sauvignon and Regent. For a while the second parent was described as unknown disease-resistant variety. Masters of Wine Jancis Robinson, Julia Harding and Swiss geneticist José Vouillamoz speculate that the identity of Resistenzpartner may be a complex hybrid that is a crossing of Silvaner with another grape that itself is a complex crossing with a Riesling x unknown Vitis vinifera and JS 12417 x Chancellor parentage. This hypothesis is supported by fact, that Cabernet blanc contain resistance markers Rpv3 and Ren3. Regent, up to now the most successful resistant variety in Germany and also having Rpv3 and Ren3, was then identified and confirmed by 25 analysed loci as the missing link.

== Viticulture ==
Cabernet blanc tends to produce loose clusters of small, thick-skinned grape berries. The vine is a very vigorous, highly disease and frost resistant variety. It has particularly strong resistance to fungal infections caused by powdery and downy mildew as well as botrytis bunch rot. It is, however, susceptible to the viticultural hazard of millerandage where the grape flowers do not get properly fertilized resulting in bunches having a mix of small, seedless berries and normal size berries. These small "shot berries" often add to the levels of sugar and phenolic extract of the wine and may make it seem "unbalanced".

== Wine regions ==
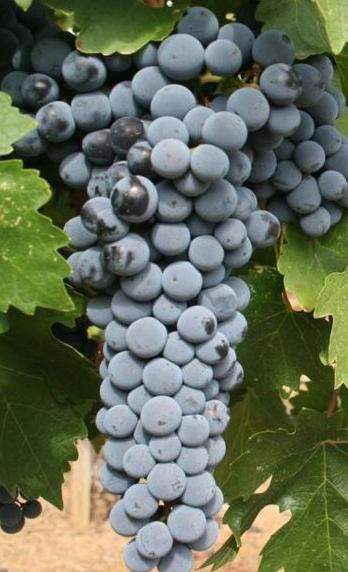
While Cabernet blanc is currently being cultivated in Germany and other wine regions, American wines labeled as Cabernet blanc or White Cabernet are actually still being made from Cabernet Sauvignon (pictured).

While Cabernet blanc was discovered in Switzerland and there are still limited plantings of the variety in that country, it is most widely planted in the German wine region of Palatinate in western Germany where there were 7 hectares (17 acres) of the grape in cultivation in 2007. Here the thick skin and high disease resistance of the variety lends itself well to the production of both dry and sweet late-harvest wines. Growers in Germany have submitted a request to put Cabernet blanc on the official list of registered grape varieties and, pending approval, plantings of the grape may increase in the country. Outside of Germany, Cabernet blanc is also found in the Netherlands were producers in Achterhoek and Gelderland are experimenting with the variety. Limited plantings of the grape also exist in Austria.

While there are American wines being marketed as "Cabernet blanc" or "White Cabernet", these wines are sweet pink-colored blush wines made from Cabernet Sauvignon rather than from true Cabernet blanc.

=== Australian Cabernet blanc ===
In Australia, a golden-berried color mutation of Cabernet Sauvignon was discovered in a vineyard in the Langhorne Creek region of South Australia. This mutant, similar to the color mutation of Pinot noir that yielded Pinot blanc, was named Shalistin and propagated by Cleggett Wines to produce light-red wine. The vine eventually mutated again to produce "whiter" berries that was used to produce a completely white wine that Cleggett marketed as "Cabernet blanc" with the first vintage released in 2002. This white wine was described as having the berry fruit flavors of a red Cabernet Sauvignon wine with earthy, tannic notes.

In 1989, a white-berried seedling of Cabernet Sauvignon, named Cygne blanc, was discovered growing in a garden in Western Australia that was planted next to a Cabernet Sauvignon vineyard. Unlike Cabernet blanc and Shalistin, Cygne blanc is neither a crossing nor a white color mutation derived from a cutting but rather a selfling that sprang from a seed of a Cabernet Sauvignon berry that fell on the ground and took root.

== Styles ==
According to Master of Wine Jancis Robinson, Cabernet blanc produces white wine that have a flavor profile "somewhere between Riesling and Sauvignon blanc" with many of the aromas similar to Sauvignon blanc.

== Synonyms ==
As a relatively recent hybrid, Cabernet blanc does not have many synonyms with only Blattner 91-26-1 and VB 91-26-1 recognized by the Vitis International Variety Catalogue (VIVC) maintained by the Geilweilerhof Institute for Grape Breeding.
