= Valentin Blattner =

Swiss winemaker

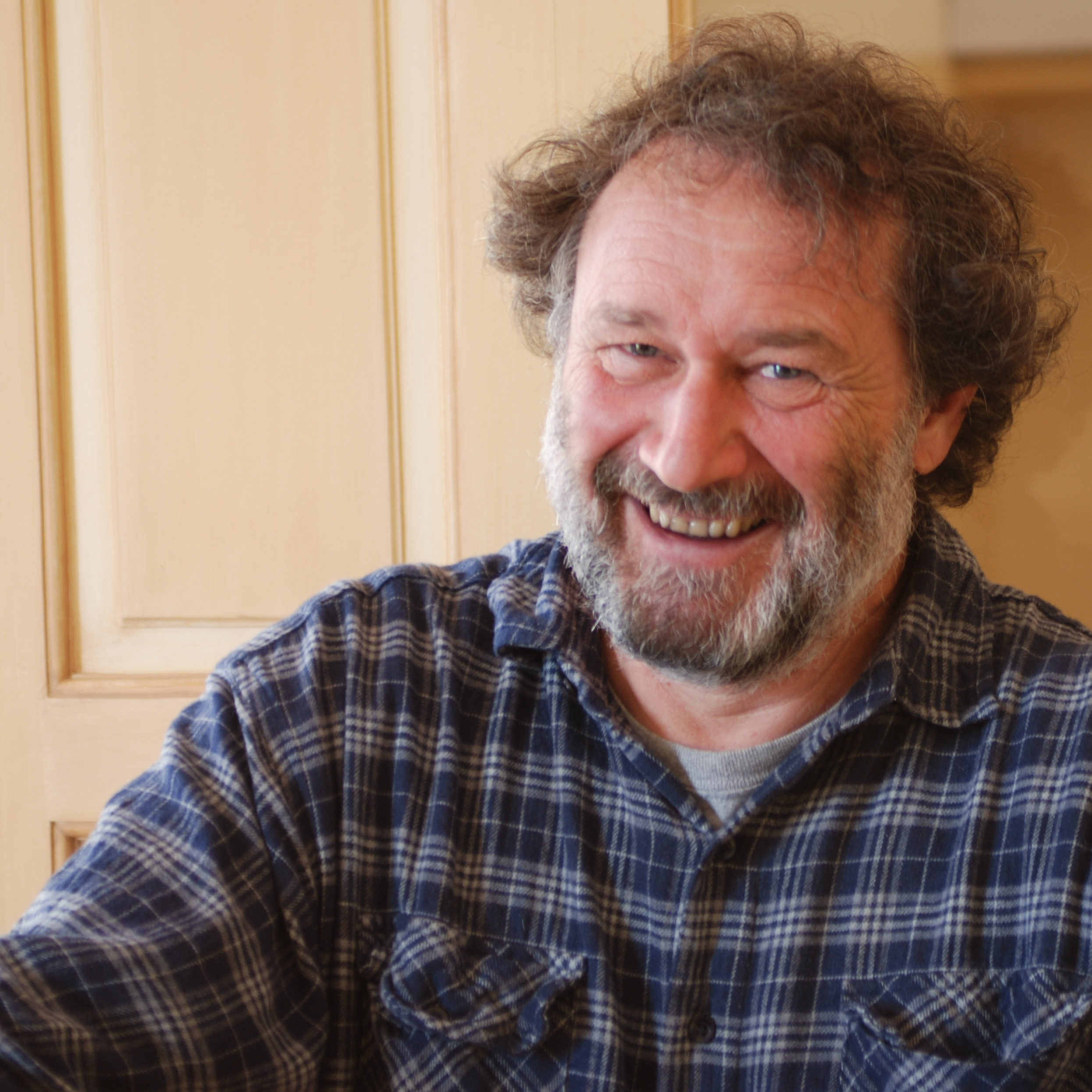
Valentin Blattner at Château Duvivier

Valentin Blattner is a Swiss grape geneticist, grape breeder and winemaker of the Jura Mountains. Blattner has conducted very important research into finding disease-resistant grapes in viniculture since the 1980s, and is best known for developing Cabernet blanc in his Soyhières nursery in 1991. He crossed varieties of vinifera with other subspecies, which have since become known as "Blattners". In making his wines, he relies on traditional field breeding techniques. He has a position at the Institute of Ecology and Grape Breeding in Switzerland.

== Varieties created or propagated ==
- Birstaler Muskat (Seyval blanc x Bacchus)
- Cabernet blanc (Cabernet Sauvignon x Regent)
- Cabernet Jura (Medina x Kaberne Severnyi)
- Cabernet noir (a crossing of Cabernet Sauvignon with an unknown variety)
- Cabertin (Cabernet Sauvignon x Regent)
- Pinotin (Cabernet Sauvignon x Regent)
- Reselle (Bacchus x Seyval blanc)
- Petite Milo (unknown x Resistenzpartner crossing) grown in British Columbia and Nova Scotia, Canada
- Epicure (Cabernet Sauvignon x Resistenzpartner) grown in British Columbia, Canada named after Victorian Epicure a company in Victoria BC that lent much support in the development of the Blattner crosses in Canada
- Cabernet Foch (Cabernet Sauvignon x Foch crossing) grown in British Columbia and Nova Scotia, Canada
- Amiel (Cabernet Sauvignon x Resistenzpartner crossing) grown in British Columbia, Canada. Early ripening white grape ripening about the same time as Ortega in the BC coastal climate.
- Labelle (Cabernet Foch x Resistenzpartner crossing) grown in British Columbia, Canada. A very early ripening red grape.
