= Annual growth cycle of grapevines =

Process that takes place in the vineyard each year

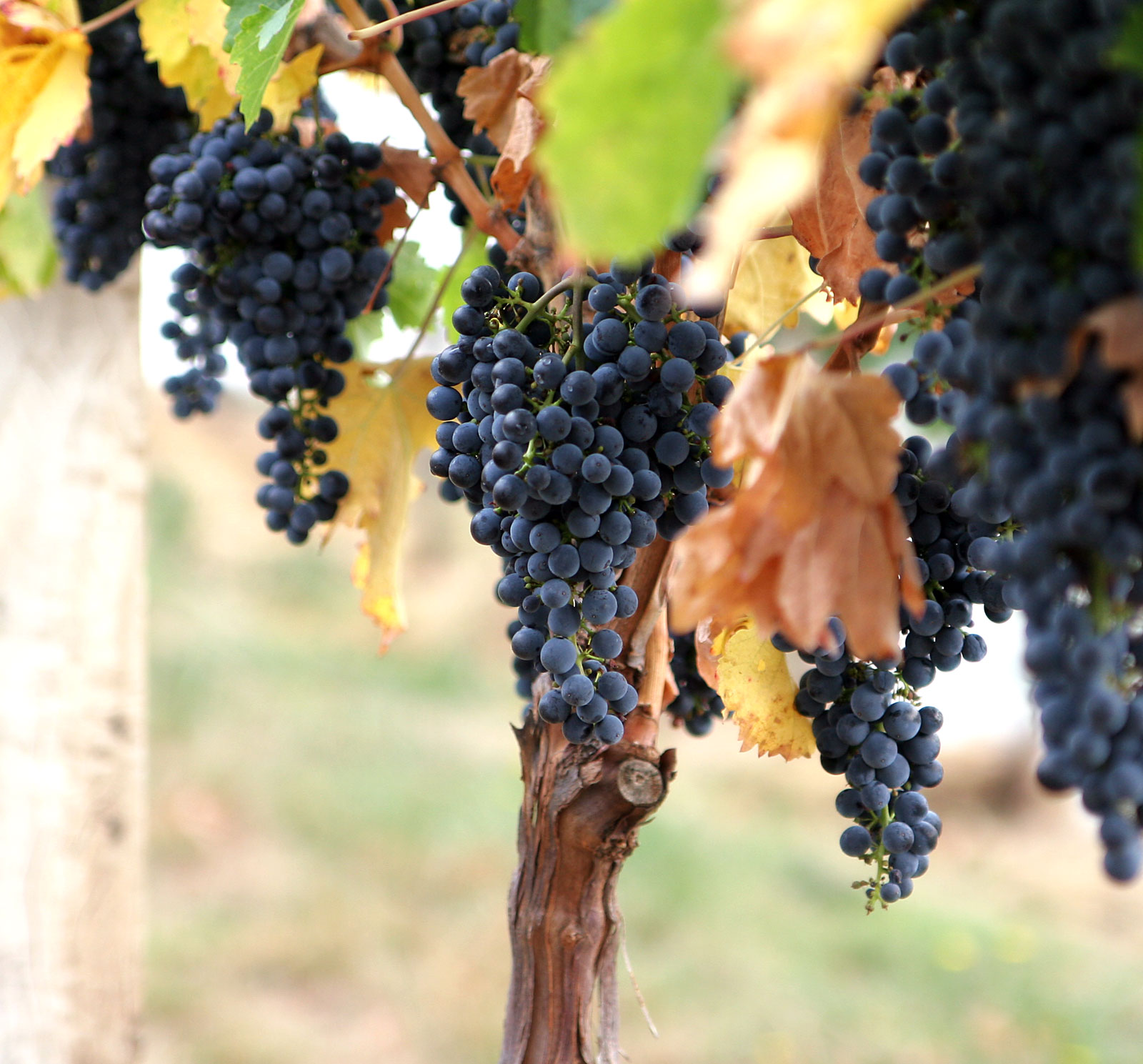
Grape vine and fruit

The annual growth cycle of grapevines is the process that takes place in the vineyard each year, beginning with bud break in the spring and culminating in leaf fall in autumn followed by winter dormancy. From a winemaking perspective, each step in the process plays a vital role in the development of grapes with ideal characteristics for making wine. Vineyard managers and Viticulturalists track how climate, vine disease, and pests help or hinder the vine's progress through bud break, flowering, fruit set, veraison, harvesting, leaf fall, and dormancy, responding when needed with practices like canopy management, irrigation, vine training, and agrochemicals. The stages of the annual growth cycle usually become observable within the first year of a vine's life. The amount of time spent at each stage of the growth cycle depends on a number of factors – most notably the type of climate (warm or cool) and the characteristics of the grape variety.

== Bud break ==
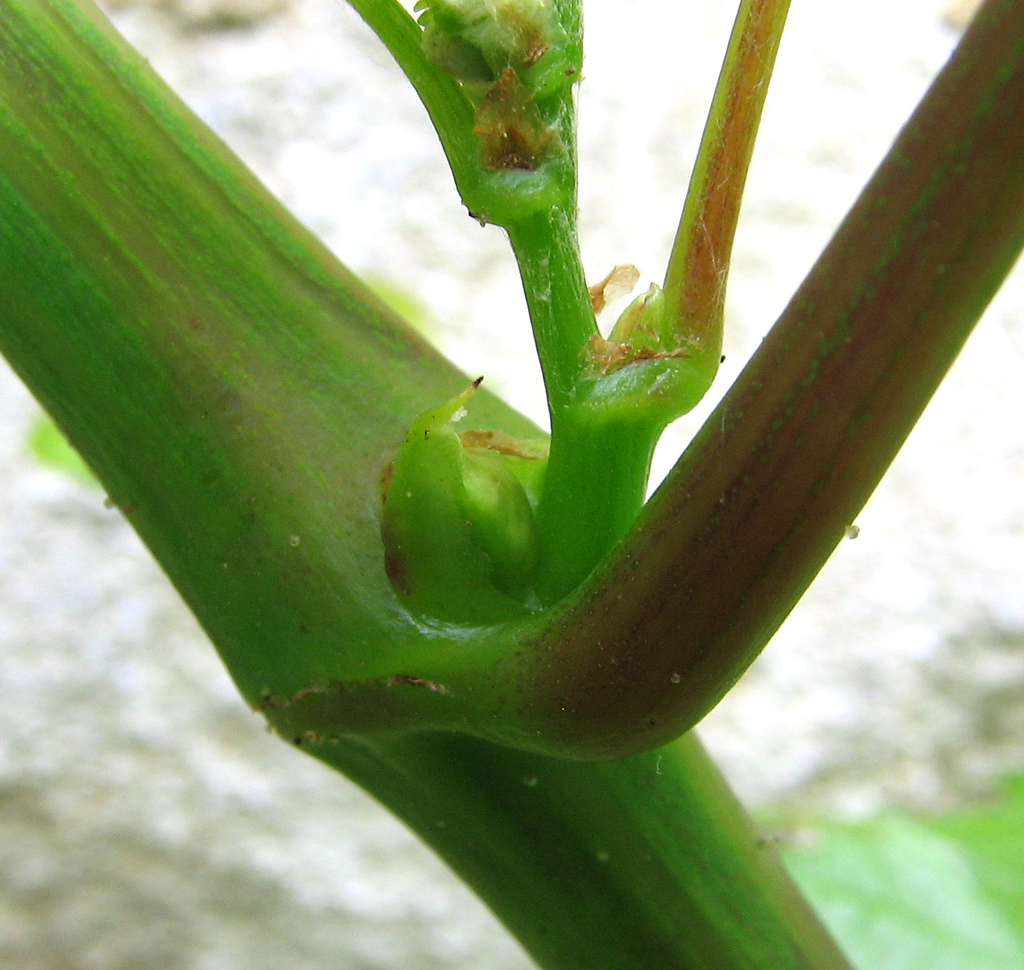
The bud of a Regent vine located between the stem and petiole.

The grape starts its annual growth cycle in the spring with bud break. In the Northern Hemisphere, this stage begins around March while in the Southern Hemisphere it begins around September when daily temperatures begin to surpass 10 °C (50 °F). If the vine had been pruned during the winter, the start of this cycle is signaled by a "bleeding" of the vine. Once the soil warms, osmotic pressure drives water carrying a dilute mix of organic acids, hormones, minerals, and sugars from the vine's root system up through the pruning cuts (or "wounds"). During this period a single vine can "bleed" up to 5 litres (1.3 US gal) of water.

Tiny buds on the vine start to swell and eventually shoots begin to grow from the buds. Buds are the small part of the vine that rest between the vine's stem and the petiole (leaf stem). Inside the buds contain usually three primordial shoots. These buds appear in the summer of previous growth cycle green and covered in scales. During winter dormancy they turn brown until the spring when the vine begins the process of bud break and the first sign of green in the vineyard emerges in the form of tiny shoots. The energy to facilitate this growth comes from reserves of carbohydrate stored in roots and wood of the vine from the last growth cycle. Eventually the shoots sprout tiny leaves that can begin the process of photosynthesis, producing the energy to accelerate growth. In warm climates, after about 4 weeks the growth of the shoots starts to rapidly accelerate with the shoots growing in length an average of 3 cm (1.2 in) a day.

In temperate climates, where temperatures can reach above 10 °C (50 °F) in mid-winter, some early budding varieties (such as Chardonnay) can be at risk of premature bud break. This is a potential viticultural hazard in places like the Margaret River region of Western Australia where warm currents from the Indian Ocean can coax Chardonnay vines to prematurely bud in the mid-winter month of July. After bud break, the young shoots are very vulnerable to frost damage with vineyard managers going to great lengths to protect the fragile shoots should temperatures dramatically drop below freezing. This can include setting up heaters or wind circulators in the vineyard to keep cold air from settling on the vines.

== Flowering ==
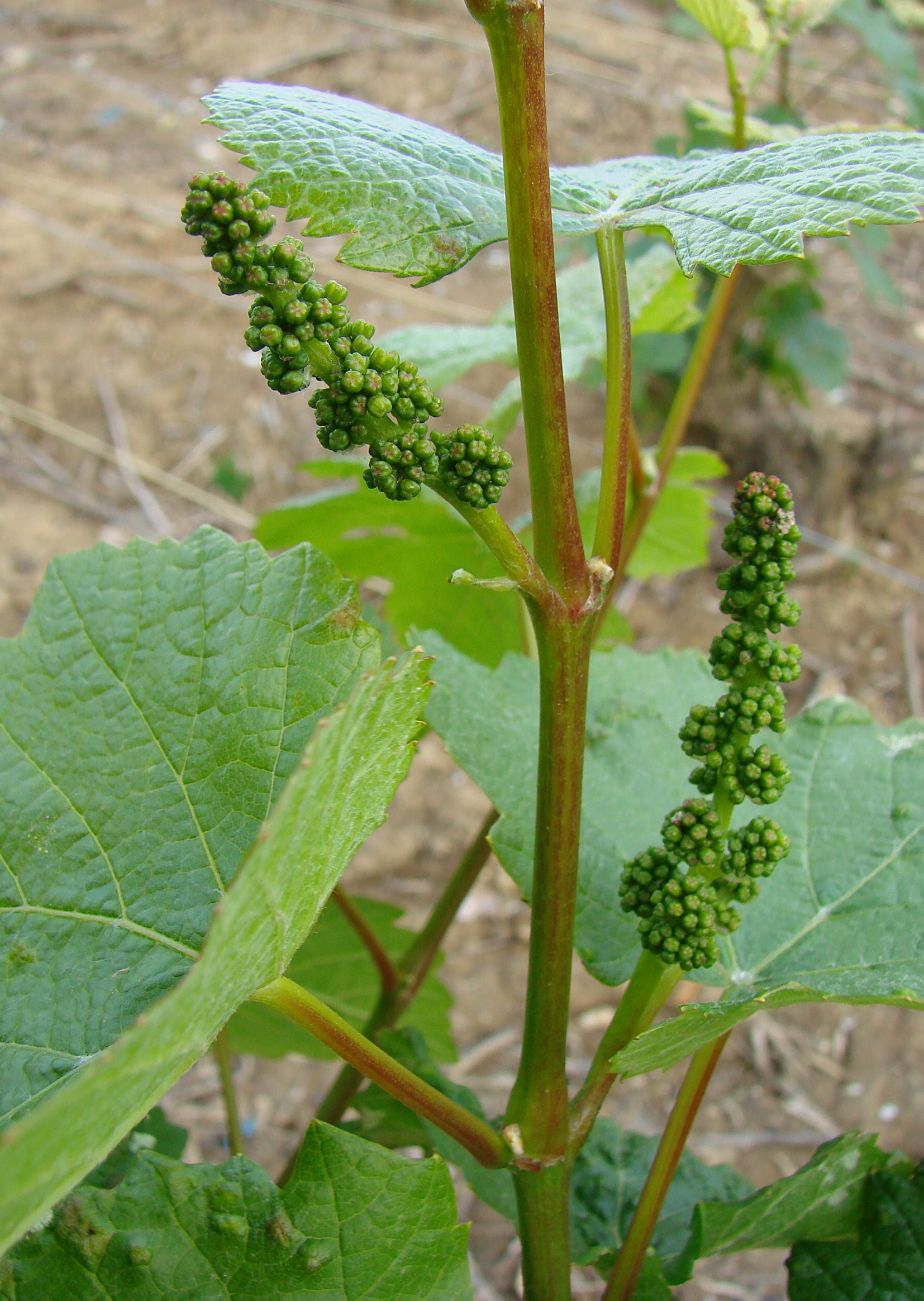
Developing inflorescences

Depending on temperatures, 40–80 days after bud break the process of flowering begins with small flower clusters resembling buttons appearing on the tips of the young shoots. Flowering occurs when average daily temperatures stay between 15 and 20 °C (59 and 68 °F), which in the Northern Hemisphere wine regions is generally around May and for the Southern Hemisphere regions around November. A few weeks after the initial clusters appear, the flowers start to grow in size with individual flowers becoming observable. It is during this stage of flowering that the pollination and fertilization of the grapevine takes place with the resulting product being a grape berry, containing 1–4 seeds.

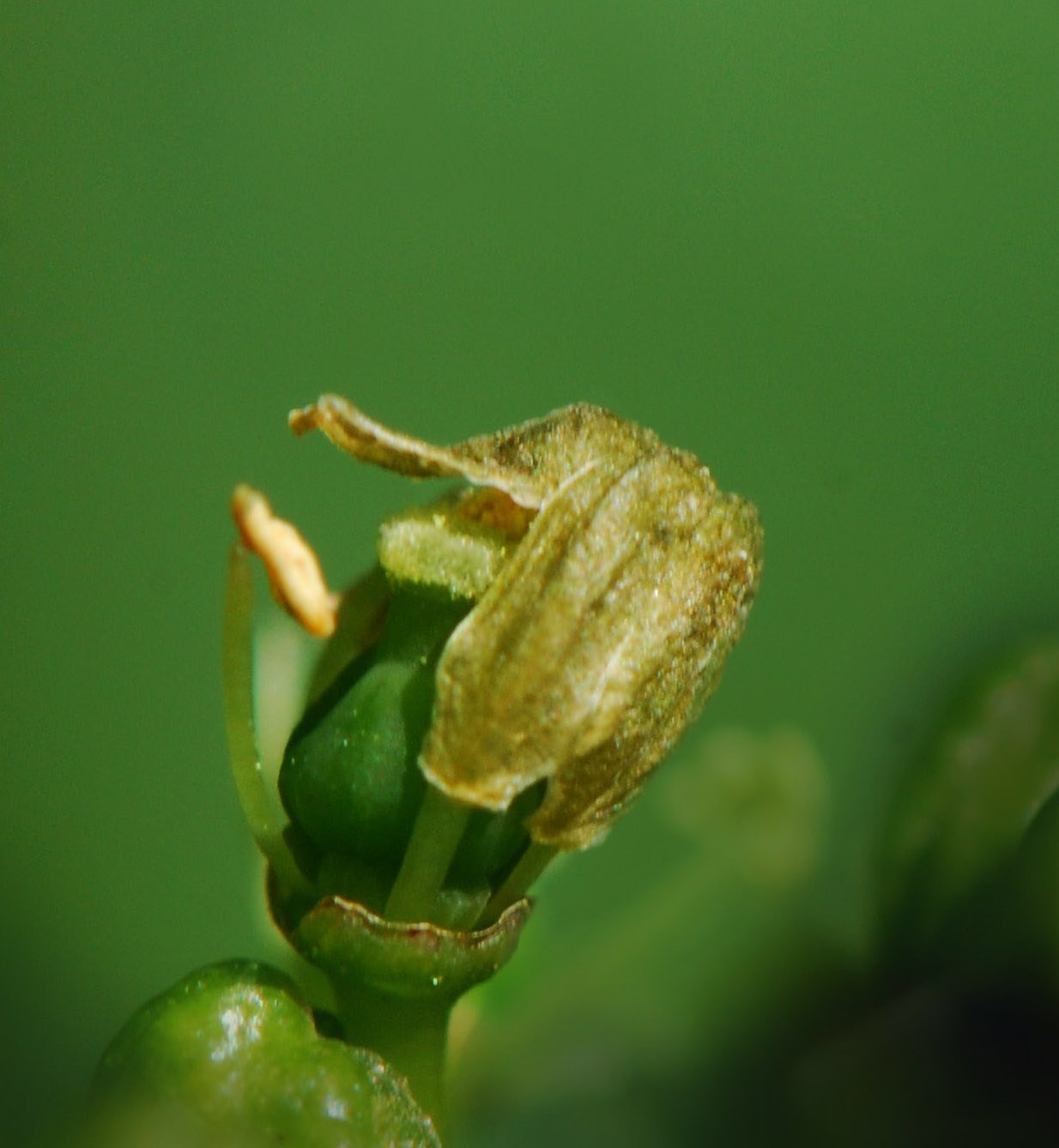
The calyptra is shed and pollen is transferred from the anthers to the stigma fertilizing the flower.

Most cultivated Vitis vinifera grape vines are hermaphroditic, with both male stamens and female ovaries, while many wild grapes are either male, producing pollen but no fruit, or female, producing fruit only if a pollinator is nearby. Hermaphroditic vines are preferred for cultivation because each vine is more likely to self-pollinate and produce fruit.

At the beginning of the flowering process the only part that is visible is the fused cap of petals known as the calyptra. Shortly after the calyptra is shed, liberating the pollen from the anthers of the stamen. Wind and insects generally play only a small role in aiding pollination, with the process being mostly self-contained within the vine. But cross-pollination between vines of different varieties is possible: Cabernet Sauvignon is a cross of Cabernet Franc and Sauvignon blanc; Petite Sirah is a cross of Syrah and Peloursin. During the process of fertilization, the pollen fertilizes the ovary which produces seeds as the flower begins the transformation into a grape berry, encapsulating the seed. Detrimental weather (cold, wind & rain) can severely affect the flowering process, causing many flowers not to be fertilized and produce a group. It is during this time that the buds that will become next year's crops begin to form.

== Fruit set ==
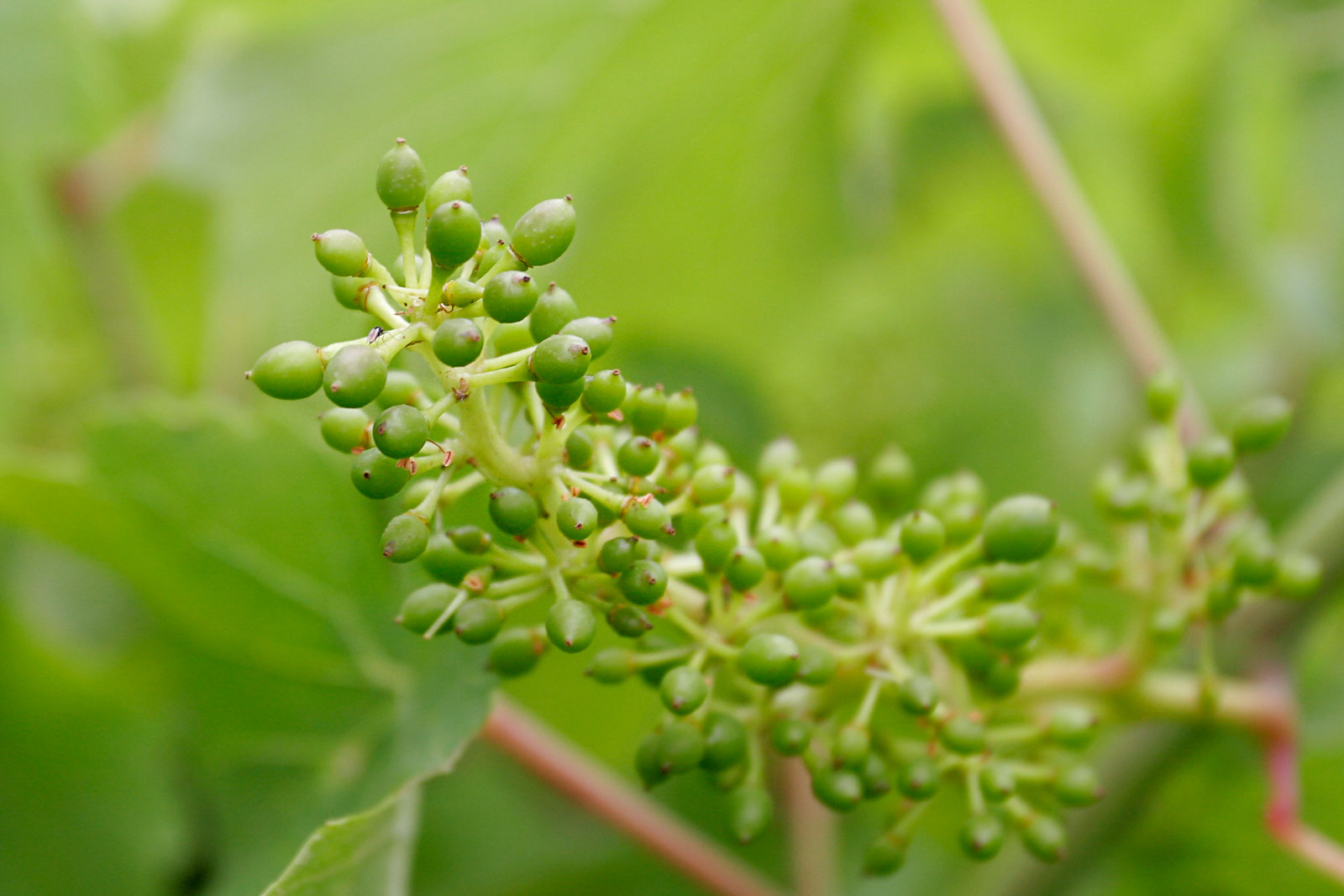
Following fertilization, the fruit begins to form.

The stage of fruit set follows flowering almost immediately, when the fertilized flower begins to develop a seed and grape berry to protect the seed. In the Northern Hemisphere, this normally takes place in May and in the Southern Hemisphere in November. This stage is very critical for wine production since it determines the potential crop yield. Not every flower on the vine gets fertilized, with the unfertilized flowers eventually falling off the vine. The percentage of fertilized flowers averages around 30 but can get as high as 60 or be much lower. Climate and the health of the vine play an important role with low humidity, high temperatures and water stress having the potential of severely reducing the percentage of flowers that get fertilized. Coulure occurs when there is an imbalance of carbohydrate levels in the vine tissues and some berries fail to set or simply fall off the bunch. Varieties like Grenache and Malbec are prone to this abnormal fruit set. Millerandage occurs when some fertilized flowers do not form seeds but only small berry clusters. Grape berry size depends on the number of seeds so berries with no seeds will be significantly smaller than berries containing seeds. On one cluster there may be berries of various sizes which can create problems during winemaking due to the varying "skin to pulp" ratio among the grapes. This can be caused by vine disease, such as fanleaf, or by a boron deficiency in the vine. Gewürztraminer and the Chardonnay clones IA and Mendoza are both prone to millerandage.

== Veraison ==
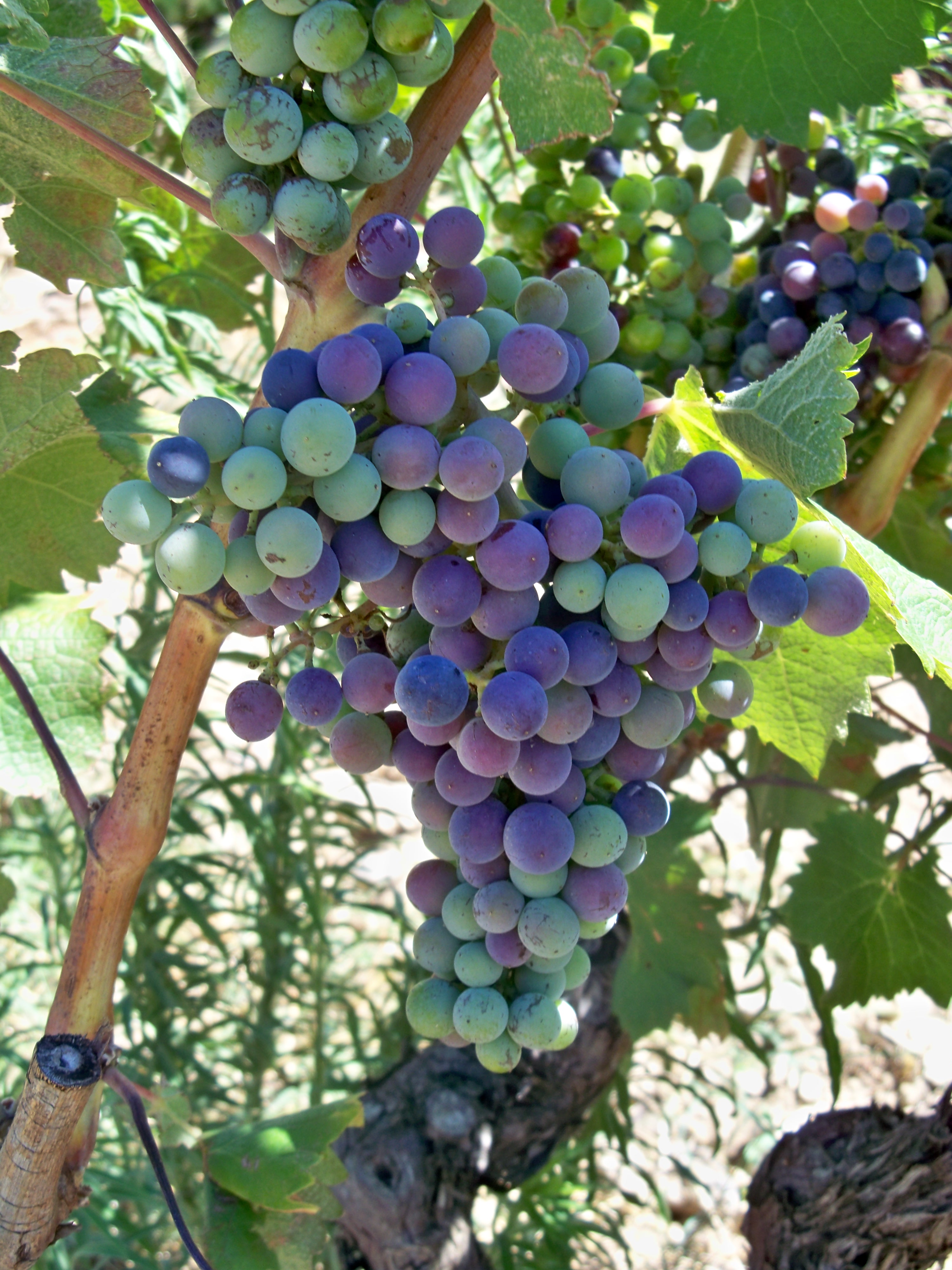
A cluster of grapes undergoing véraison.

Following fruit set, the grape berries are green and hard to the touch. They have very little sugar and are high in organic acids. They begin to grow to about half their final size when they enter the stage of veraison. This stage signals the beginning of the ripening process and normally takes place around 40–50 days after fruit set. In the Northern Hemisphere this will be around the end of July and into August and between the end of January into February for the Southern Hemisphere. During this stage the colors of the grape take form—red/black or yellow/green depending on the grape varieties. This color changing is due to the chlorophyll in the berry skin being replaced by anthocyanins (red wine grapes) and carotenoids (white wine grapes). In a process known as engustment, the berries start to soften as they build up sugars. Within six days of the start of veraison, the berries begin to grow dramatically as they accumulate glucose and fructose and acids begin to fall.

The onset of veraison does not occur uniformly among all berries. Typically the berries and clusters that are most exposed to warmth, on the outer extents of the canopy, undergo veraison first with the berries and clusters closer to the trunk and under the canopy shade undergoing it last. There are some factors in the vineyards that can control the onset of veraison, limited water stress and canopy management that creates a high "fruit to leaf" ratio can encourage veraison. This is because the vine is biologically programmed to channel all its energies and resources into the berries, which houses its seedling offspring, to provide them a better chance of survival. Conversely, very vigorous vines with plentiful leaf shading for photosynthesis and water supply will delay the start of veraison due to the vines energies being directed towards continued shoot growth of new buds. For the production of high-quality wine, it is considered ideal to have an earlier veraison. During this period the cane of the vine starts to ripen as well changing from green and springing to brown and hard. The vines begins to divert some of its energy production into its reserves in preparation for its next growth cycle.

== After harvest ==
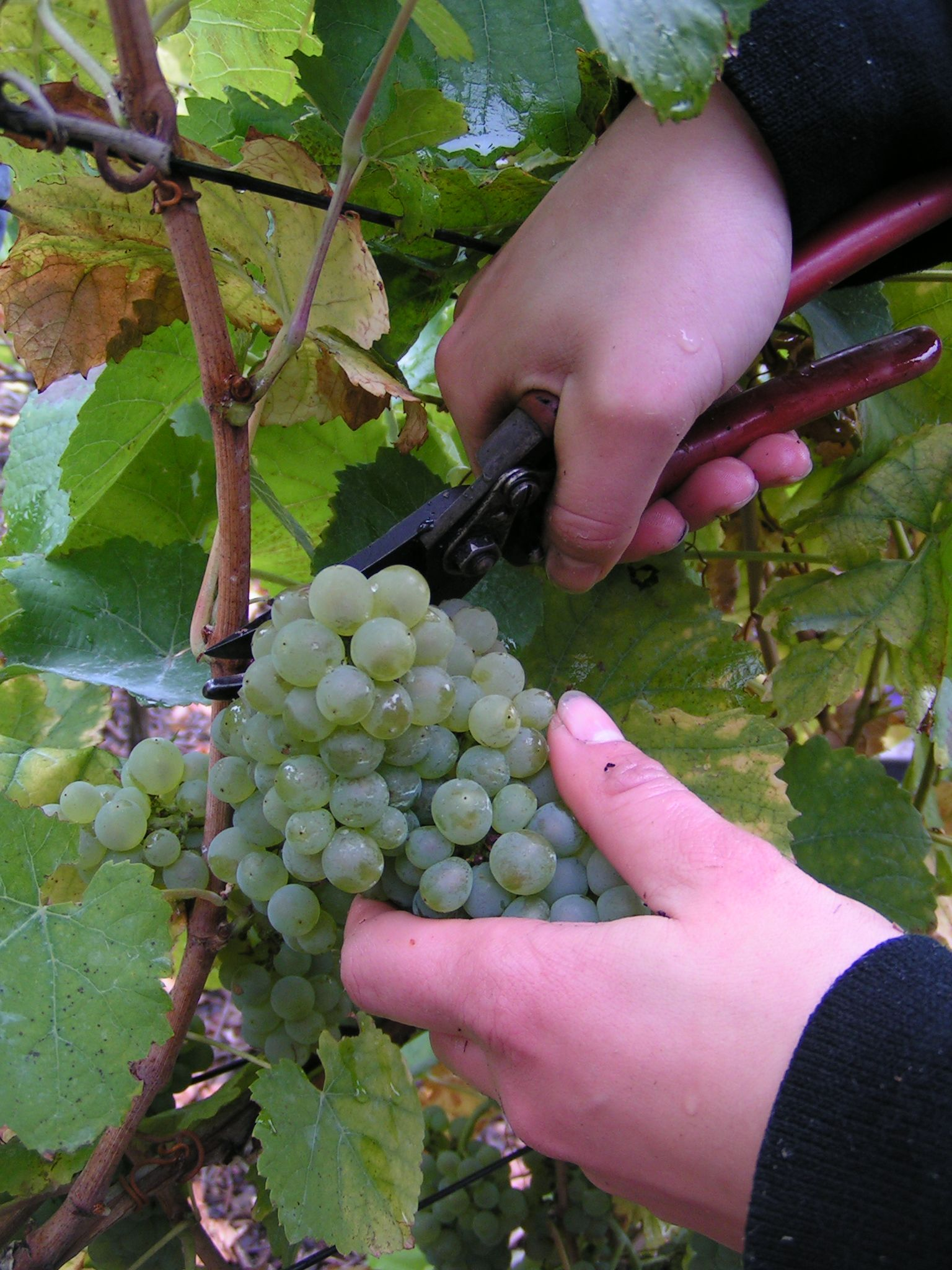
Harvesting grapes

In the vineyard, the antepenultimate event is the harvest in which the grapes are removed from the vine and transported to the winery to begin the wine making process. In the Northern Hemisphere this is generally between September and October while in the Southern Hemisphere it is generally between February and April. The time of harvest depends on a variety of factors – most notably the subjective determination of ripeness. As the grape ripens on the vines, sugars and pH increase as acids (such as malic acid) decrease. Tannins and other phenolics also develop, which can affect the flavors and aromas in the resulting wine. The threat of detrimental weather and vine diseases (such as grey rot) can also play a role in the time table. The balance of all these factors contributes to when a winemaker or vineyard manager decides that it is time to harvest.

Following the harvest, the vines continue the process of photosynthesis, creating carbohydrate reserves to store in the vine's roots and trunks. It will continue doing this until an appropriate level of reserves have been stored. At that point the chlorophyll in the leaves begins to break down and the leaves change color from green to yellow. Following the first frost the leaves begin to fall as the vine starts to enter its winter dormancy period. The following spring, the cycle begins again.

== See also ==
- BBCH-scale (grape)
