= Coulure =

Viticultural hazard

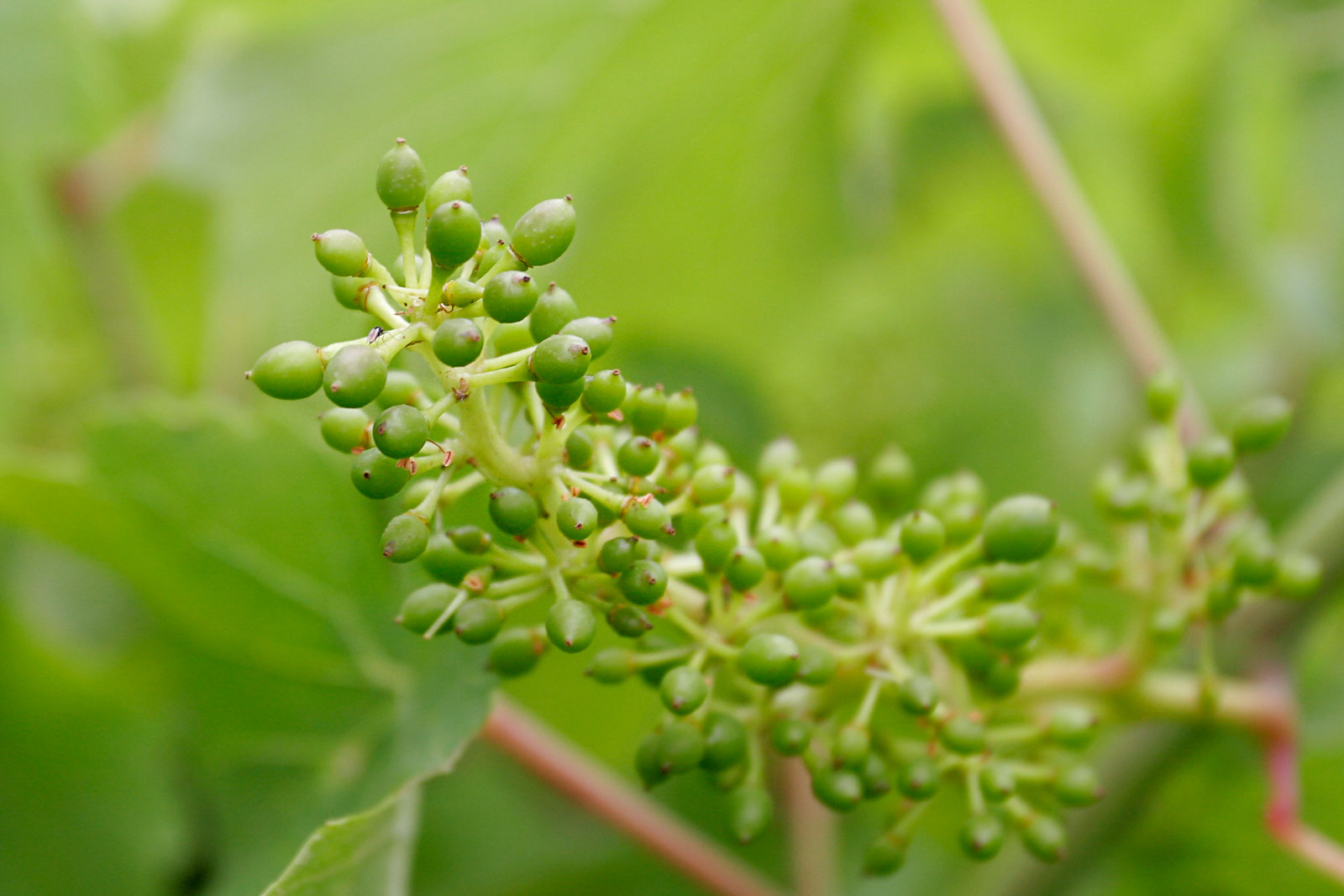
Young grapes are most susceptible to coulure right after flowering when they need vital carbohydrate resources in order to develop fully.

Coulure (pronounced coo-LYUR) is a viticultural hazard that is the result of metabolic reactions to weather conditions that causes a failure of grapes to develop after flowering. In English the word shatter is sometimes used. Coulure is triggered by periods of cold, cloudy, rainy weather or very high out-of-season temperatures. The condition is most often manifested in the spring. It also occurs in vines that have little sugar content in their tissue. Flowers stay closed and are not fertilized. Thus the vines are not pollinated as the grape fails to develop and falls off. Coulure can also cause irregular bunches of grapes which are less compact than normal. These bunches are more sensitive to developing various grape diseases. The yield of a vine with coulure will decrease substantially. Grape varieties with high proclivity to coulure are Grenache, Malbec, Merlot, and Muscat Ottonel. Other causes of coulure may be vineyard conditions and practices, pruning too early or too severely, excessively fertile soils or overuse of fertilizers, and improper selection of rootstocks or clones.

During the flowering part of the growing season (May–June in the Northern Hemisphere, November–December in the Southern Hemisphere), grapevines often need dry conditions with sufficient sunlight and ambient air temperature around 15 °C (59 °F) for pollination to go smoothly. Less ideal conditions, particularly wet, rainy weather, increases the odds that a higher than normal numbers of flowers go unpollinated and coulure to occur.

Coulure is a distinct phenomena unrelated to another viticultural hazard, millerandage, where the flowers are pollinated but the resulting berries develop without seeds and remain small. Like coulure, millerandage is often caused by inclement weather during the flowering and fruit set period and cause reduced yields.

== Cause and effect ==
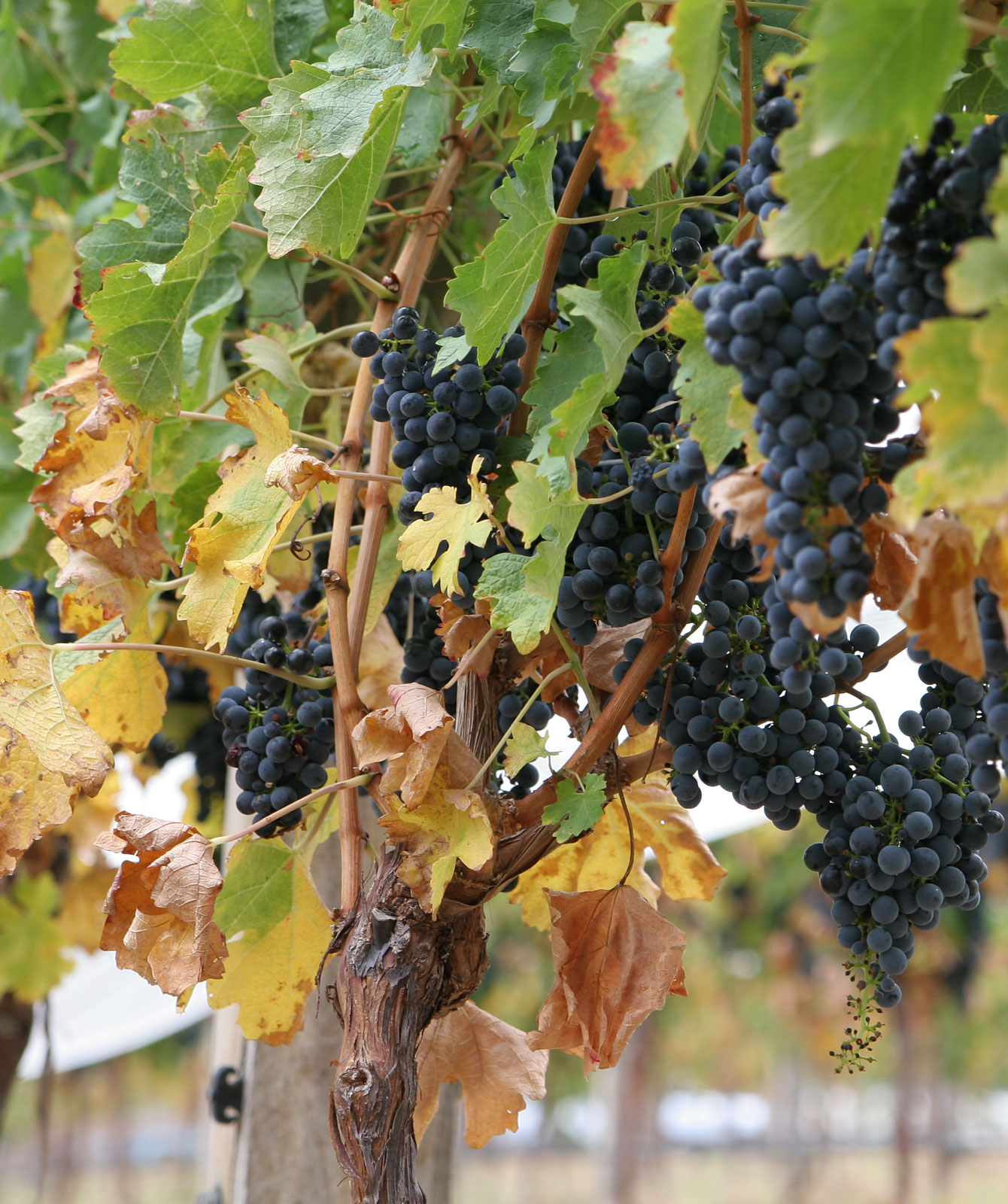
Grapevines need a balance of sufficient leaf cover in order to produce photosynthesis but not shade the grapes too much from sunlight.

Coulure is caused by a carbohydrate deficiency in the plant tissues that causes the vine to conserve resources that would otherwise be funneled into the developing grape berries. As carbohydrate levels drop, soon after flowering the stems connected to the berries shrivel as the small grapes (0.2 inches/5 millimeters in diameter) eventually fall off.

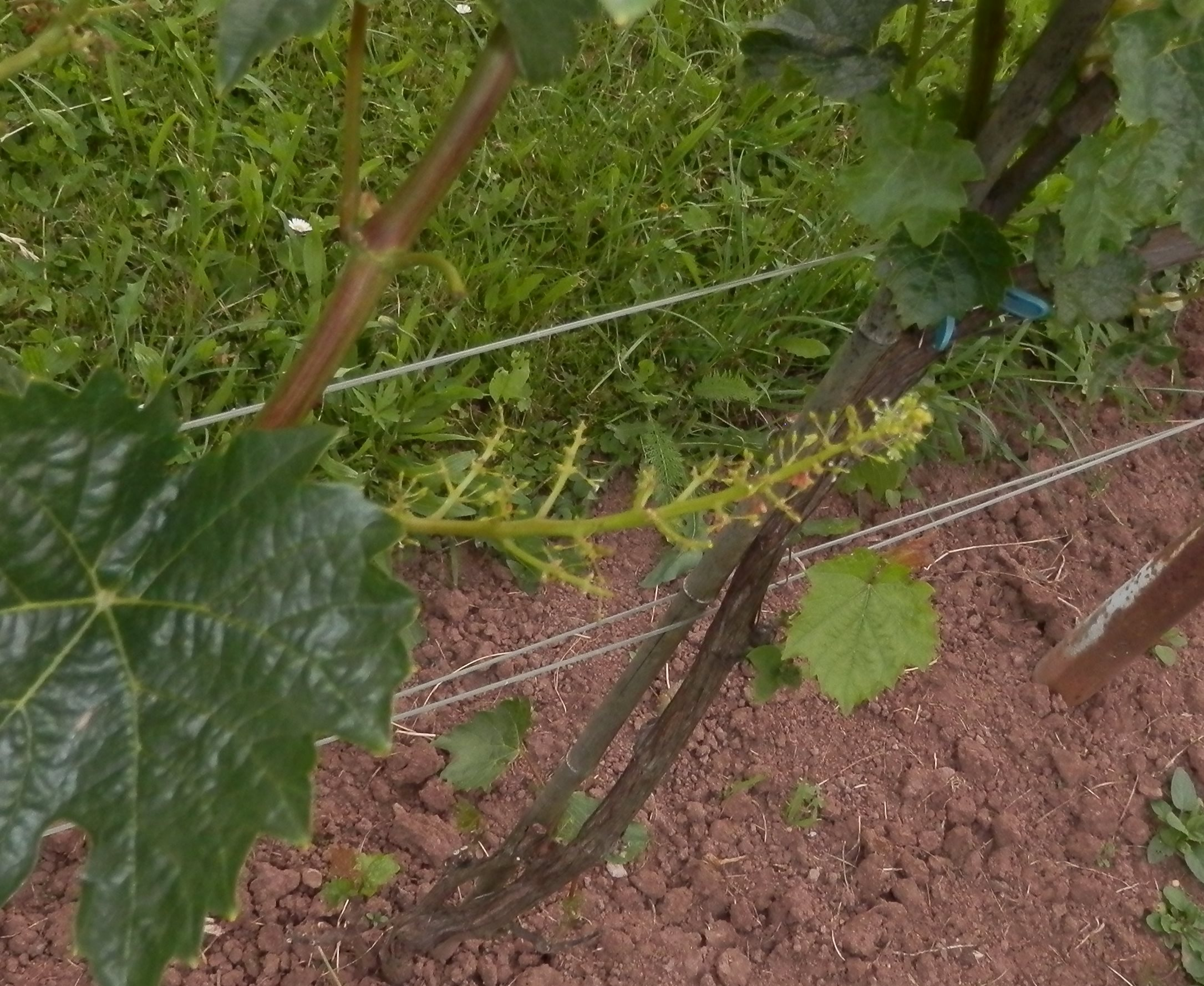
Most likely a clear example of coulure.

To some extent coulure and the dropping of fruit is a natural and healthy reaction of a vine that is self-regulating its resource and the amount of fruit that it produces. But when the situation is exacerbated by certain weather conditions and disruption to photosynthesis, coulure can have a more severe impact on yields that may negatively affect a region's grape supply and thus influence pricing.

When the weather is the primary instigator of coulure, the French term this phenomenon coulure climatique. This describes the cloudy and wet conditions that limit the amount of photosynthetic activity that takes place during the flowering cycle of a grapevine. Limited sunshine means lower sugar levels that can be converted into resources to develop grape berries. Warm temperatures can also exacerbate coulure in some grape varieties by promoting cellular respiration and excessive shoot growth that further competes with the berries for the resources derived from carbohydrates. Other contributing factors include excessively fertile vineyard soils, either naturally or enhanced by the use of nitrogen-rich fertilizers, overly vigorous rootstock and severe pruning that too drastically limits the amount of leaf surface needed to sustain photosynthesis.

== Prevention ==
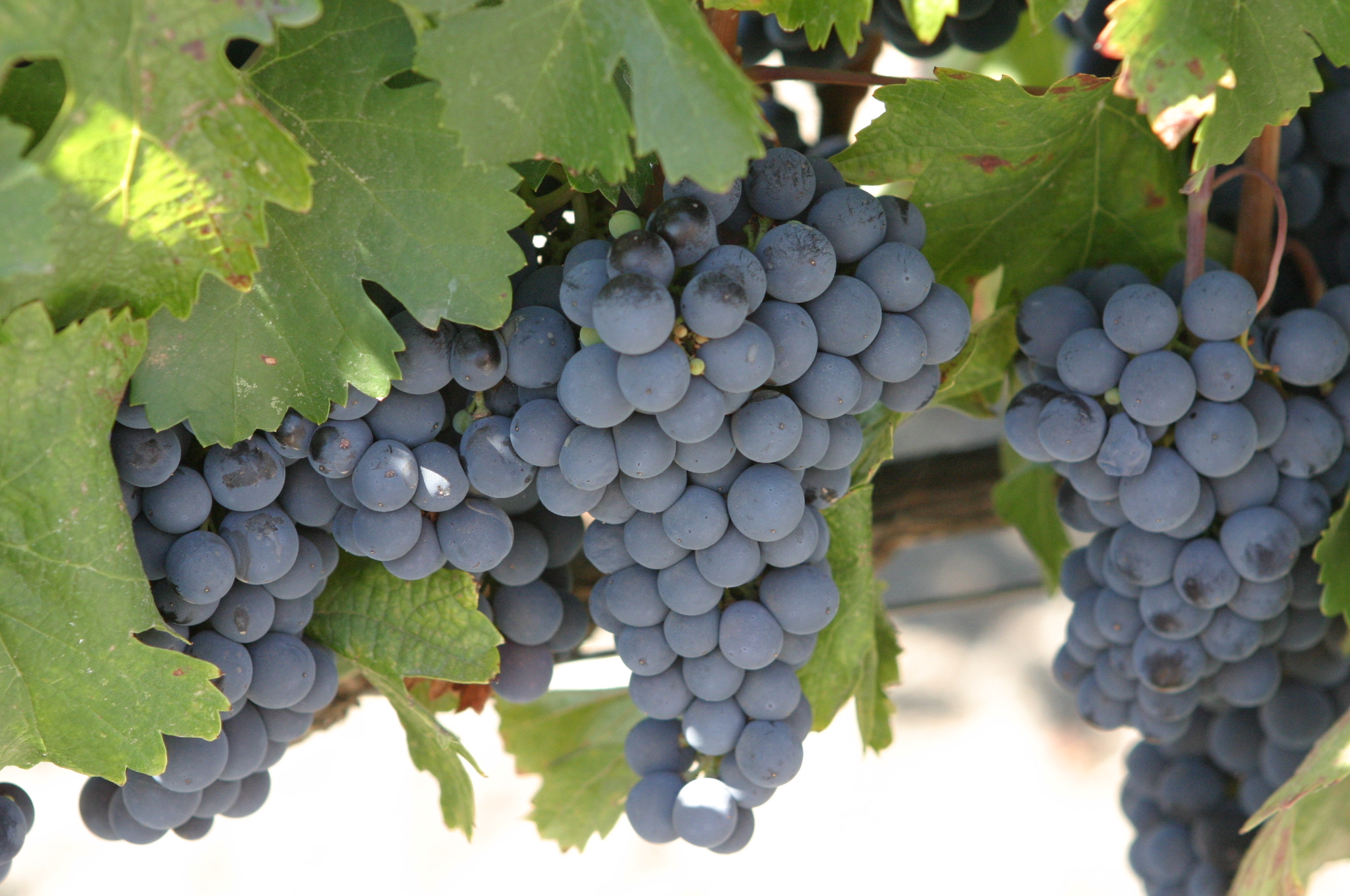
Malbec can be highly susceptible to coulure but newer clones are being produced with less sensitivity.

Coulure is not 100% preventable but a vineyard manager can take several precautions to lessen the severity and impact of coulure. Some grape varieties are more prone to develop coulure than others, such as Grenache, Malbec, Merlot and Muscat Ottonel. A grower can choose to grow clones of those varieties, now commonly available for Merlot and Malbec, that have less susceptibility to developing coulure. In the vineyard, care can be taken to not prune so severely and insure that there is adequate leaf coverage for photosynthesis. Trimming the tips of developing shoots near the end of the flowering period can lessen the competition for sugar resources between berries and new shoot development. For non-organic viticulture, chemical growth inhibitors can be applied to the vine to limit shoot growth as well.
