= Veraison of grapes =

Onset of grape ripening in viticulture

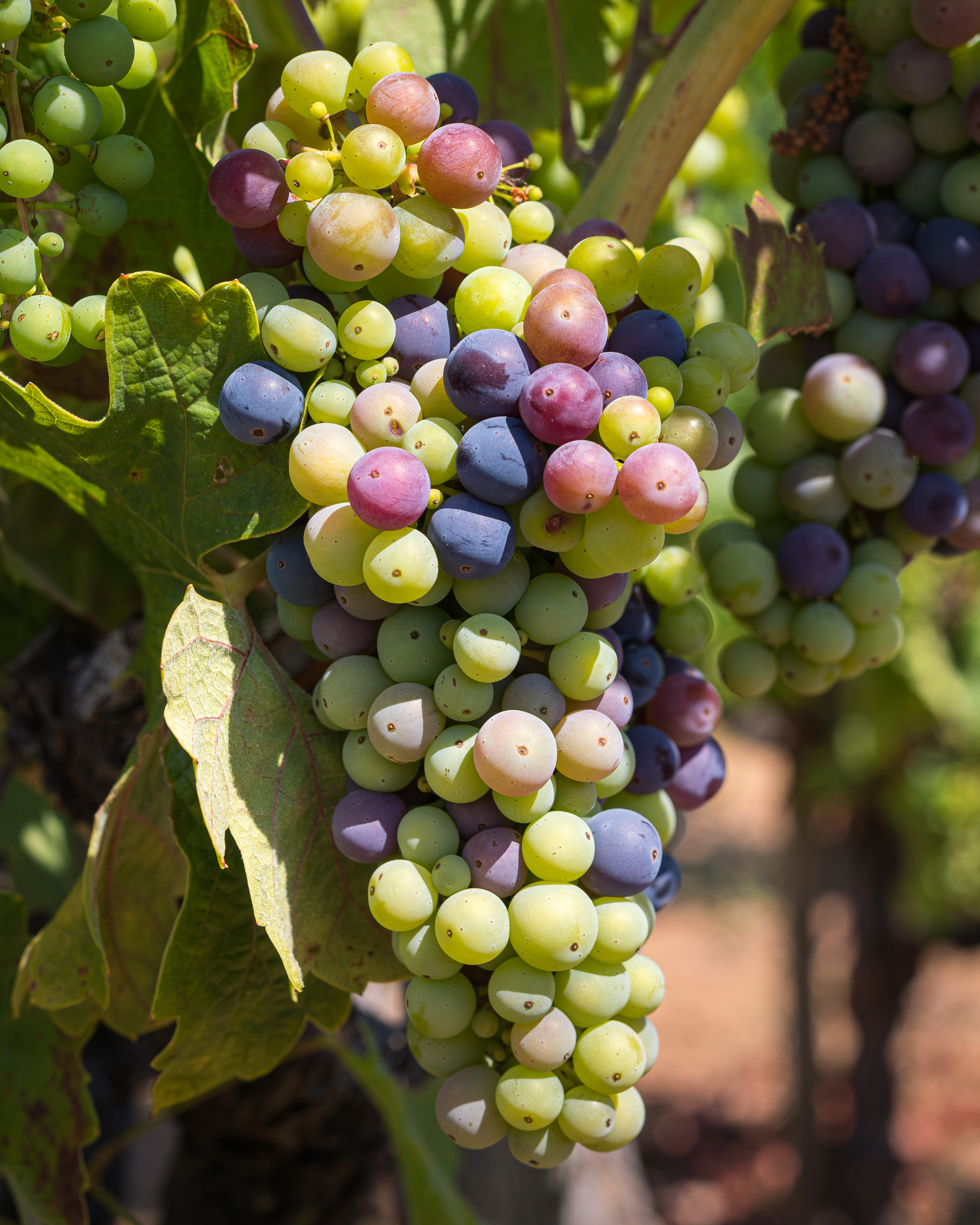
Zinfandel grapes in Dry Creek Valley during veraison

In viticulture, veraison (French: véraison, IPA: [veʁɛzɔ̃]) is the onset of the ripening of the grapes. The official definition of veraison is "change of color of the grape berries". Veraison represents the transition from berry growth to berry ripening, and many changes in berry development occur at veraison.

== Process ==
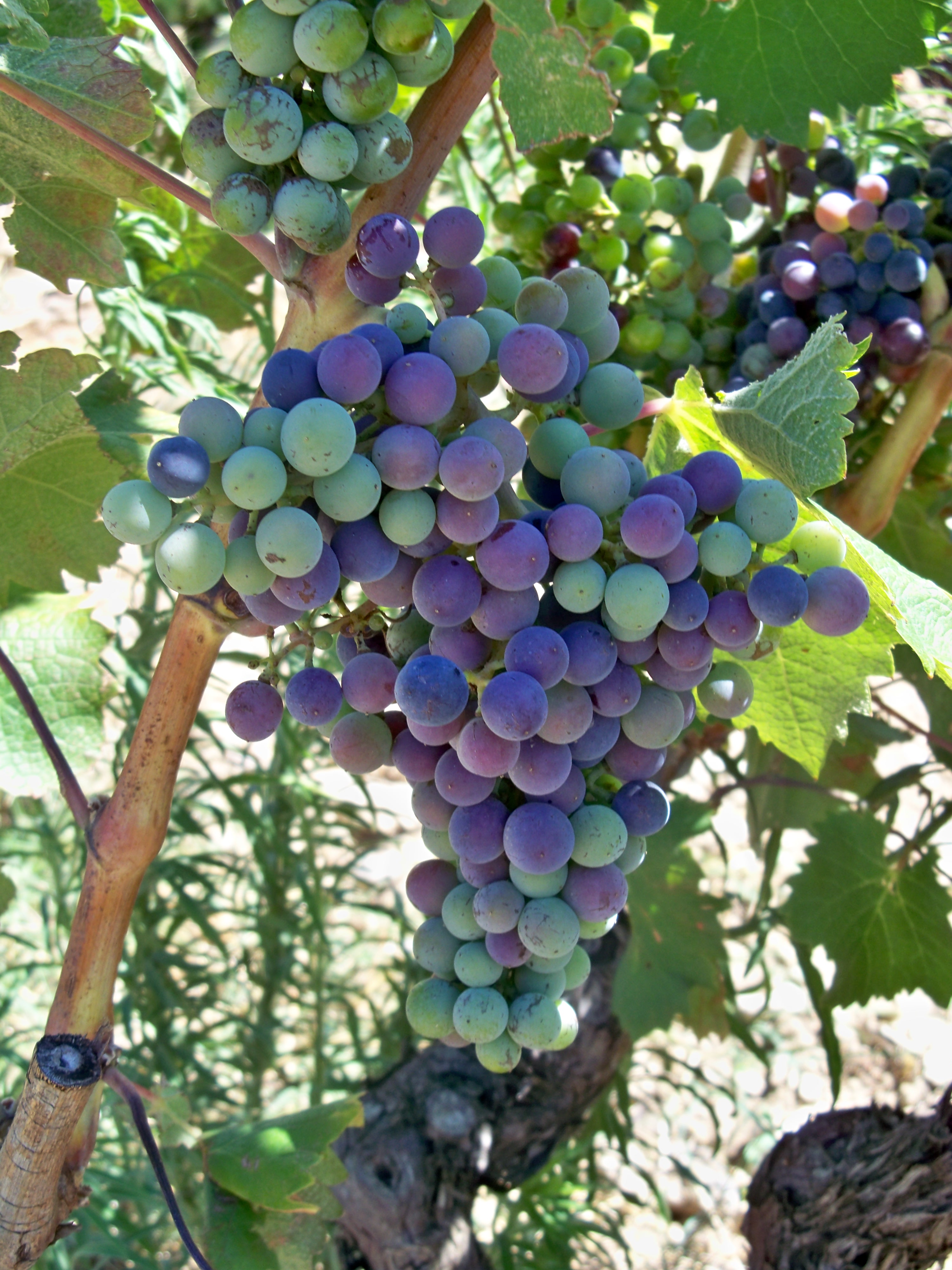
Véraison in Chateauneuf du Pape

Grape berries follow a double sigmoid growth curve. The initial phase of berry growth is a result of cell division and cell expansion. As berry growth of phase I slows this is termed the lag phase. The lag phase is not a physiological growth stage, but an artificial designation between the two growth periods of grape berry development.

Post-veraison, fruit acidity decreases due to degradation of malic acid. The degradation of malic acid during ripening makes tartaric acid the predominant acid; grape berries also possess a small amount of citric acid. Tartaric acid accumulates early in phase I of berry growth, while malic acid accumulates at the end of phase I berry growth.

At the same time as acidity decreases, hexose sugars are accumulated. The accumulation of hexose sugars (glucose, fructose) is associated with the development of xylem cell discontinuities which reduce the volume of water entering the berry relative to the volume of sugar, resulting in an increase in sugar concentration. Physiologically, the sugar concentration can increase to around 25 percent via sugar development. Further increases in sugar concentration are due to dehydration of the fruit. The deposition of sugar into the berry depends on the level of leaf photosynthesis, the number of competing sinks on the vine and sugar accumulation.

As ripening continues, the fruit becomes attractive to animals due to changes in aroma from acidic to sweet with fruitiness. As ripening occurs, herbaceous aromas (e.g. methoxypyrazines) are degraded. It is unknown whether the degradation of herbaceous aromas allows fruit aromas to be detected, or if fruity aromas develop later in berry ripening.

The berry also changes in color, presumably because chlorophyll is broken down. In white cultivars, carotenoids are formed, while in red cultivars, anthocyanins and xanthophylls are formed.

The trigger of veraison is unknown, but may signify the seed reaching maturity, an unlikely signal, however, because seedless berries also proceed through veraison.

== Other uses ==
Fête de la Véraison is a medieval festival held in the famous winemaking village of Châteauneuf-du-Pape.

== See also ==
- Annual growth cycle of grapevines
