= Ripeness in viticulture =

How the term "ripe" is used in viticulture and winemaking

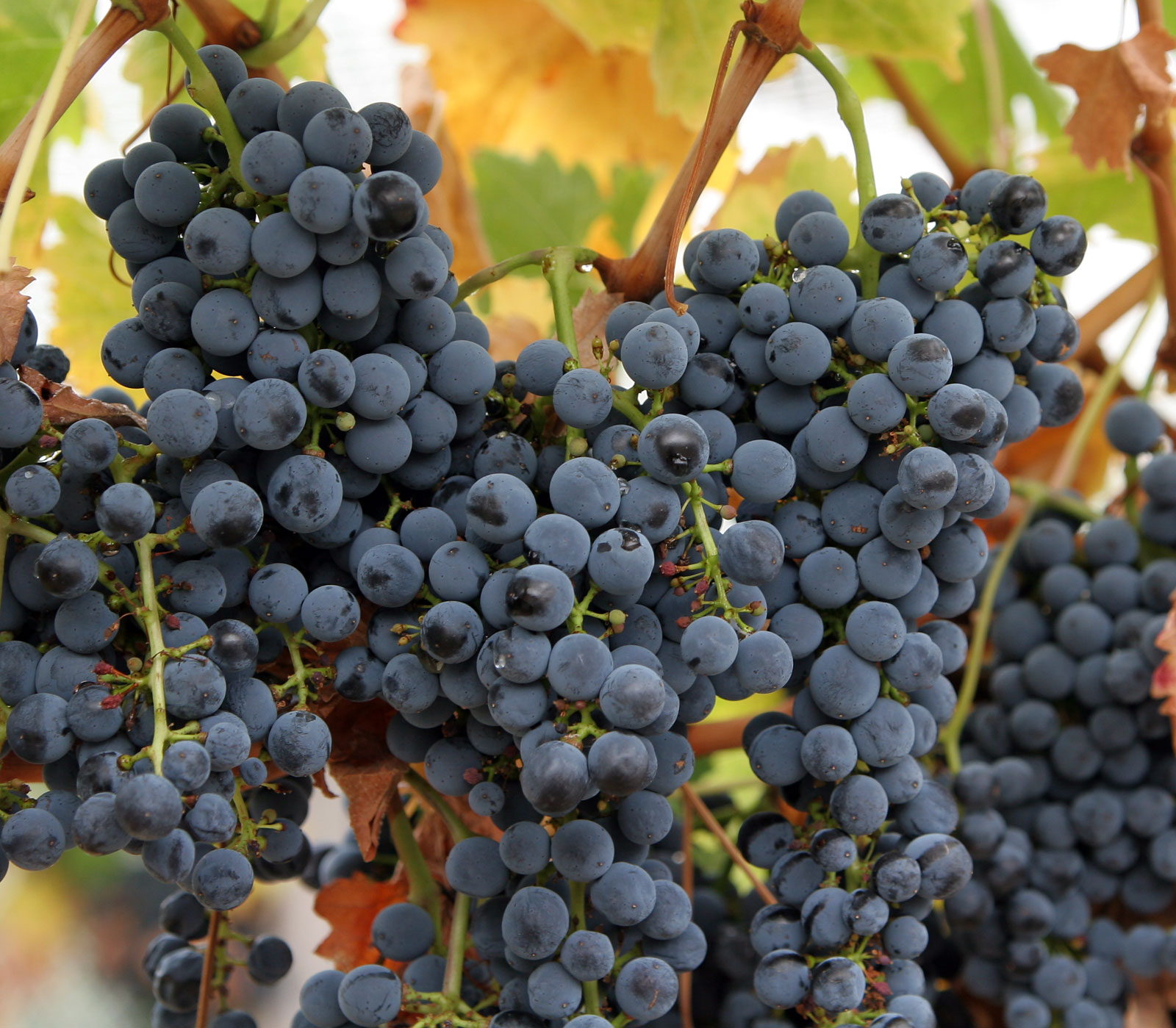
Grapes ripening on the vine.

In viticulture, ripeness is the completion of the ripening process of wine grapes on the vine which signals the beginning of harvest. What exactly constitutes ripeness will vary depending on what style of wine is being produced (sparkling, still, fortified, rosé, dessert wine, etc.) and what the winemaker and viticulturist personally believe constitutes ripeness. Once the grapes are harvested, the physical and chemical components of the grape which will influence a wine's quality are essentially set so determining the optimal moment of ripeness for harvest may be considered the most crucial decision in winemaking.

There are several factors that contribute to the ripeness of the grape. As the grapes go through veraison, sugars in the grapes will continue to rise as acid levels fall. The balance between sugar (as well as the potential alcohol level) and acids is considered one of the most critical aspects of producing quality wine so both the must weight and "total acidity", as well as the pH of the grapes, are evaluated to determine ripeness. Towards the end of the 20th century, winemakers and viticulturists began focusing on the concept of achieving "physiological" ripeness in the grapes-described as a more complete ripeness of tannins and other phenolic compounds in the grapes that contribute to the color, flavor and aroma of wine.

== What happens to a grape as it ripens ==
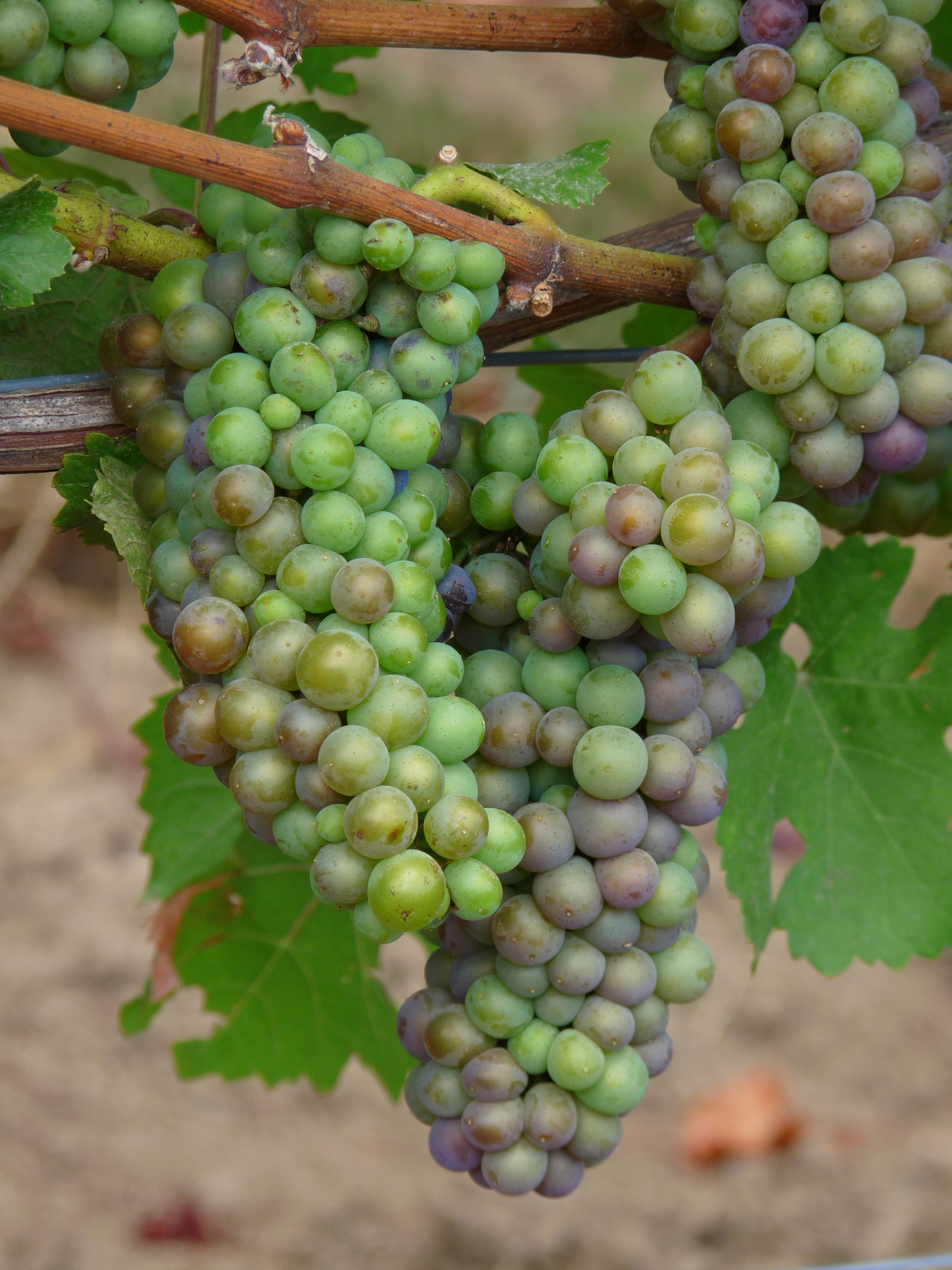
Pinot noir grapes in the early stages of veraison. As the grapes ripen, the concentration of phenolic compounds like anthocyanins replaces the green color of chlorophyll in the grape berries which makes them black instead.

If ripening is broadly defined as the development of wine grapes, then it could be said that ripening is happening throughout the continuous annual cycle of the grapevine. More narrowly defined, ripening begins at the inception of veraison. At this point (which is normally 40–60 days after fruit set though it may be longer in cooler climates), the grapes are hard and green with low sugar levels and very high levels of mostly malic acids. During veraison, which may last from 30–70 days depending on the climate and other factors, the grapes go through several changes which impact their sugar, acid, tannin and mineral composition. The concentration of phenolic compounds in the skin, most notably anthocyanins for red wine grapes, replaces the green color of chlorophyll as the grape berries themselves change color.

The increase of sugars in the grapes comes from the storage of carbohydrates in the roots and trunk of the grapevines as well as through the process of photosynthesis. Sucrose produced by photosynthesis is transferred from the leaves to the berries as it is broken down into glucose and fructose molecules. The rate of this build up will depend on several factors including the climate (such as a string of cloudy weather which prohibits sunlight from reaching the vine) as well as the potential yield size of grape clusters and young vine shoot tips which compete for the resources of the mother grapevine. As the concentration of sugars builds up, the concentration of acids decreases due, in part, to simple dilution but also to the consumption of acids in the process of plant respiration. The decrease in free acids, as well as the buildup of potassium, triggers a rise in the pH level of the grape juice.

In addition to the change in sugar, acids and pH levels of other components of the grapes are building up during the ripening process. The mineral components of potassium, calcium, magnesium and sodium increase in concentration as they are disseminated among the skin of the grapes and its fleshy pulp. The color of the grape berries begins to change due to the building up of phenolic compounds such as anthocyanin in the skins. Flavonoids and volatile compounds known as "flavor precursors" which contribute to the eventual flavor and aroma of the wine also begin to build up in the skins and pulp. Additionally the concentration of tannins in the grape increases in several areas of the grape including the skin, seeds and stem. Early in the ripening process these tannins are very bitter and "green". Exposure to the warmth and sunlight during the ripening period ushers in chemical changes to the tannins that when processed into wine makes the tannins feel softer in the mouth.

=== Varying ripeness levels for different wines ===
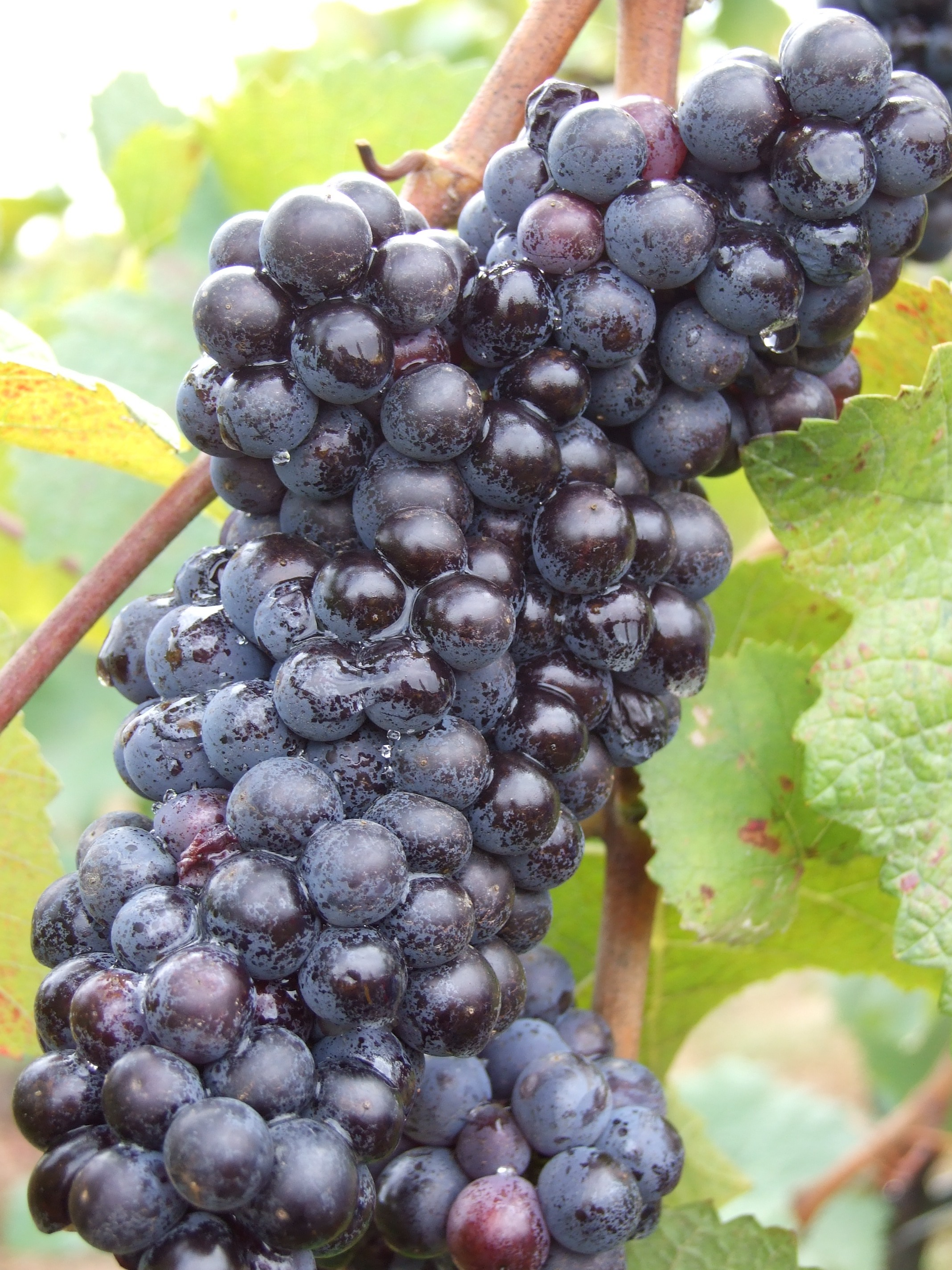
Pinot noir grapes that are destined for sparkling wine will be considered ripe much earlier than Pinot noir destined for still red wine.

What constitutes "ripeness" will vary according to what style of wine is being produced as well as the particular views of winemakers and viticulturists on what optimal ripeness is. The style of wine is usually dictated by the balance between sugars and acids. What may be considered "ripe" for one winemaker could be considered underripe to another winemaker or even overripe to yet a third winemaker. Climate and the particular grape variety will also play a role in determining ripeness and date of harvest. In very hot climates, such as certain areas in California and Australia, ripeness is usually achieved around 30 days after veraison starts while in much cooler climates, like the Loire Valley and parts of Germany, this may not occur until 70 days after veraison. The ripening periods for each individual grape variety will vary with grapes such as Cabernet Sauvignon taking much longer to ripen compared to early ripening varieties such as Chardonnay and Pinot noir.

Since over the course of ripening sugars in the grapes increase, the sweetness level as well as the potential alcohol level of the wine will play a considerable role in dictating when a grape is "ripe" enough. This is because sugars are converted by yeast into alcohol by the process of fermentation. The greater the concentration of sugars in the grape, the greater the potential alcohol level. However, most strains of winemaking yeast have difficulties surviving in an alcohol solution above 15% alcohol by volume (ABV) and cease fermentation before all the sugar is converted into alcohol. This leaves a certain amount of residual sugar which influences the sweetness level of the wine. Wines that are destined to be sweet, such as dessert wines, are often called late harvest wines because they are harvested at extreme points of ripeness much later than when regular table wine grapes have been harvested.

The presence of alcohol (particularly ethanol) in the wine contributes much more than just healthful benefits in moderation and minimal consumption, prudently applied, or, negative effects in excess. It has an immense impact of the weight and mouthfeel of the wine as well as the balance of sweetness, tannins and acids. In wine tasting, the anaesthetic qualities of ethanol reduce the sensitivity of the palate to the harsh effects of acids and tannins, making the wine seem softer. It also plays a role during the ageing of wine in its complex interaction with esters and phenolic compounds that produce various aromas in wine that contribute to a wine's flavor profile. For this reason, some winemakers will value having a higher potential alcohol level and delay harvesting until the grapes have a sufficiently high concentration of sugars.

For other types of wines, such as sparkling wines like Champagne, maintaining a certain amount of acidity in the grapes is important to the winemaking process. As the concentration of acids in the grapes decreases the further along the ripening process you go, grapes destined for sparkling wines are often some of the earliest grapes to be harvested in a vintage. With their high acidity and low sugar levels, these grapes would be underripe and would produce table wines that many wine drinkers would consider unpalatable, yet the balance of sugars and acids is well suited for sparkling wine production.

== Factors influencing when ripeness occurs ==
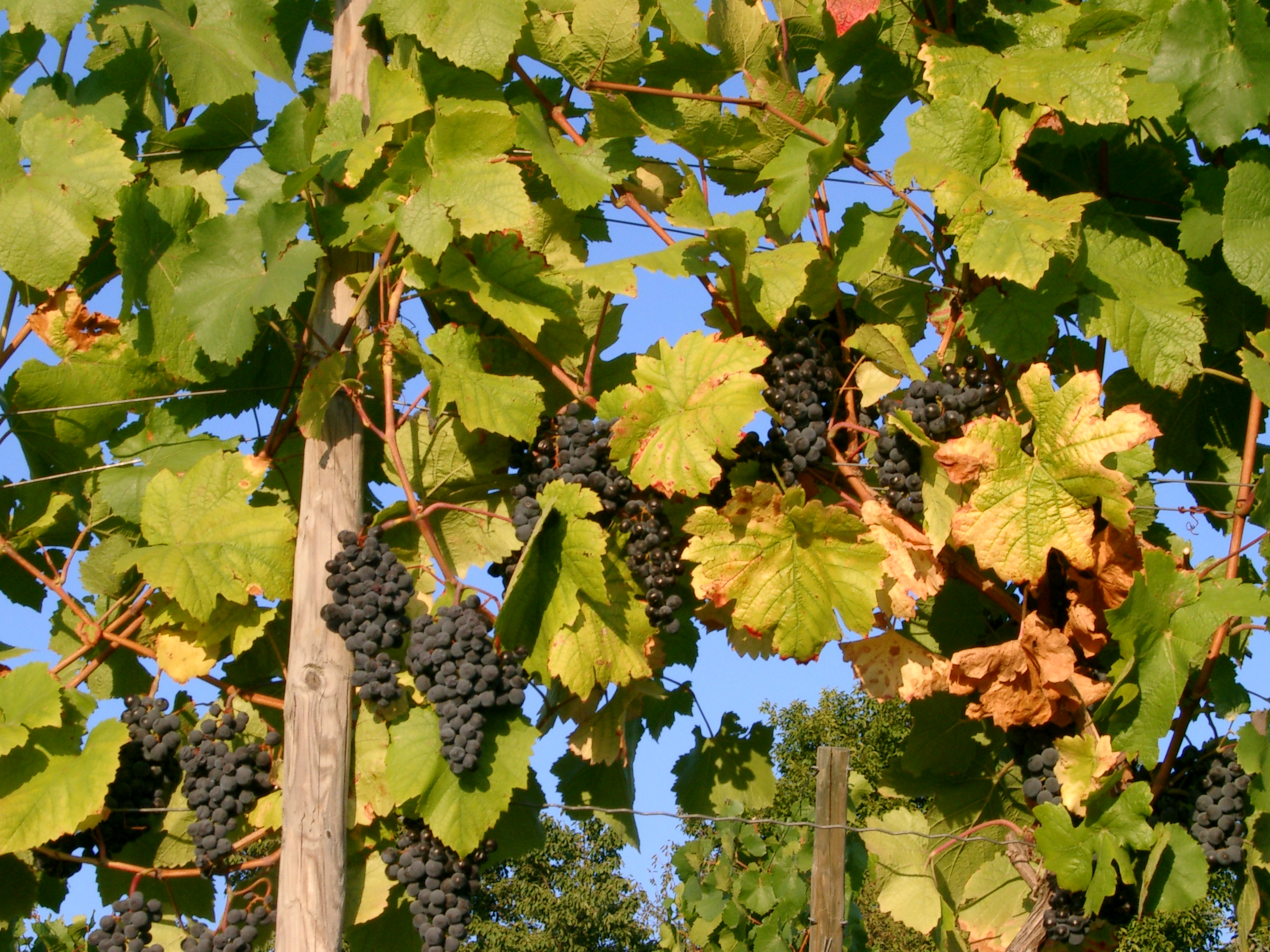
Vineyard management techniques such as canopy management can influence the ripening process of grapes by balancing the amount of foliage needed for photosynthesis versus excessive foliage that shades the grapes and competes for the grapevine's resources.

One of the primary factors influencing the ripening process of grapevine is the climate and weather. Sunlight and temperature warmth are vital to the physiological functions of the grapevine (such as photosynthesis). An absence of either, such as long periods of extensive cloud cover, will cause many functions of the vine to slow or even completely halt as the vine enters a type of "survival mode". As the grapevine funnels more resources to preserve its own survival, less resources are directed towards the ripening and development of the grape clusters. Excessive heat can also cause a grapevine to react adversely. The occurrence of heat waves during the growing season, particularly as it nears harvest, can cause the sugars in grapes to jump as acids fall dramatically. Some winemakers may decide to harvest early in order to maintain acid levels even though other components (such as tannins and phenolic compounds) may not be at optimal ripening. For the winemakers that decide to "wait it out", a lack of acid can be partially rectify during the winemaking process with the addition of acids such as tartaric acid. It is much more difficult to remedy the effects of extensive rains during the ripening period. Steady rains before the harvest can cause the berries to swell with water which dilutes the flavors as well as causing cracking in the skin that creates openings for spoilage causing microorganism to propagate. Because of these risks, the threat of prolong rainfall during a vintage may cause an early harvest before the grapes have fully ripened. The most favorable vintages allow a slow, steady ripening without drastic jumps in heats or the threat of excessive rain fall.

The role that climate plays in influencing the ripening process cannot be overstated, but it is not the only factor. Vineyard management such as pruning and canopy management can also play a significant role as it not only influences the physiological processes of the grapevine but also how the vine responds in sharing its limited resources of energy and nutrients. The leaves of a grapevine produce energy via the process of photosynthesis. A certain amount of foliage is needed to ensure that the grapevine can produce enough energy to support all its physiological functions, but too much leaf cover will shade the grape clusters, limiting the direct exposure of sunlight and warmth needed for some chemical components of the grapes to develop. An excessive amount of foliage and shading may also promote the development of various vine diseases and ailments such as bunch rot and powdery mildew which can hamper the ripening process. A very vigorous vine with many clusters and vine shoots will have several parties competing for the same resources, with the overall development of an individual clusters thus slowed. Through the process of canopy management, viticulturists try to balance not only the amount of clusters and vine shoots on the vine but also try to achieve an optimal balance of needed foliage for photosynthesis without excessive shading that could hamper the ripening process.

Even if climate and vineyard management has been ideal, other factors may prevent full and even ripeness. Among the clusters of a grapevine, individual berries may not all ripen at the same pace. This problem, commonly known as millerandage, could occur because of poor weather during the flowering period of the grape but can also be caused by soil deficient in various nutrients such as boron, an attack of various grapevine ailments such as the grapevine fanleaf virus or a number of other factors that may contribute to incomplete plant fertilization.

== Evaluating ripeness ==
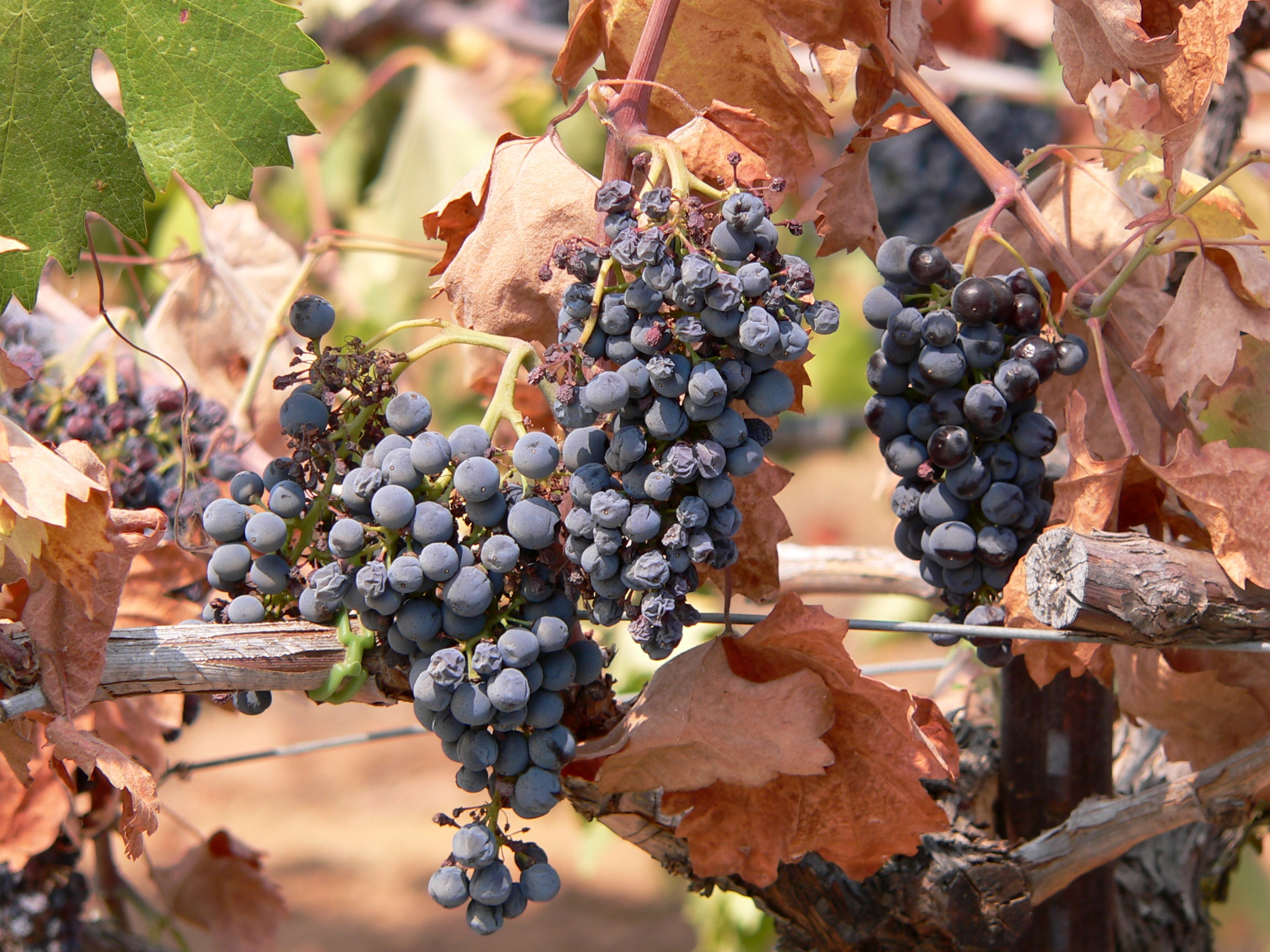
Grapes that have been left on the vine too long may become over ripe and dehydrated.

As "ripeness" constitutes a variety of factors, there are many methods that viticulturist and winemakers may use in order to determine when the grapes are sufficiently ripe to harvest. The most common method of determining ripeness involves measuring the sugar, acid and pH levels of the grapes with the purpose of harvesting at point when each number reaches its most ideal range for the type of wine being produced. In recent years, viticulturists and winemakers have shifted away from focusing purely on those numbers towards considering other factors including the ripeness of tannins, the development of flavor precursors and the potential for glycosides to development. A combination of these factors apart from sugar, acid and pH are considered "physiological" ripeness of the grape.

=== Must weight ===
Since more than 90% of all the dissolved solids in grape juice are sugars, measuring the must weight is a good indicator of the amount of sugars in the wine. Rather than measure the actual "weight" of the must, the density or specific gravity of the juice is measured in relation to the specific gravity of distilled water. Viticulturists and winemakers can use a refractometer which uses a refractive index to indirectly measure the must weight from the juice of a single grape or they can use a hydrometer in the winery with the juice from several dozen or hundreds of grape berries. Different countries around the world use various scales to measure the must weight of grape juice. In the United States, New Zealand, and parts of Australia it is measured in degrees brix (symbol °Bx); in Germany (wine) it is degrees Oechsle (°Oe); in France and most of Europe the Baumé scale was used until 1961 and in Austria the Klosterneuburger Mostwaage (°KMW) scale is used.

After veraison has begun, viticulturists will test several hundred individual berries picked from clusters throughout the vineyard in increasing intervals as the harvest draws closers. The berries will usually be taken from the middle of the cluster bunch, avoiding vines on the end of rows that tend to be exposed to the most unusual elements. The must weight is then plotted on a chart to see the increasing ripeness and sugar levels of the grape. What must weight reading is most desirable will depend on the winemaker's personal goal for ripeness. A wine with the intended potential alcohol level of 12% will need to be harvested at around 21.7°Bx/12 degree Baumé/93°Oe. A wine with the intended potential alcohol level of 15% will need to be harvested at around 27.1°Bx/15 degree Baumé/119°Oe. The desired ripeness for most table wines tend to fall somewhere between those two must weight measurements.

=== Acid level ===
The principal acids found in wine grapes are tartaric and malic acids.

As sugar levels in the grape rise, acid levels fall. All wines need some degree of acidity in order to be balanced and avoid tasting flabby or dull. Acidity is also a key component in food and wine pairing so its presence in wine is important with winemakers trying to harvest grapes before acid levels fall too low. The stress to maintain acid levels is not as bearing due to the fact that winemakers can rectify the situation somewhat by later adding acids during the winemaking process (winemakers can also rectify deficiencies in sugar levels by chaptalization). However, natural acids in the grape play other roles in the development of flavor and aroma compounds as well as fighting against the effects of spoilage organisms so the most ideal situation for winemakers is to try and harvest while acid levels are acceptable.

The major acids in wine are tartaric and malic acid with citric and succinic acids playing a small role. The titratable acidity or "TA" (also referred to as "total acidity") is the measure of the tartaric acid in the grapes. This is the most abundant acid and also the one acid that has the most pronounced and long lasting impact on the taste of the wine. The TA is often measured by neutralizing some grape juice with a standard alkaline solution (such as sodium hydroxide) and then using an indicator (such as phenolphthalein) which changes color depending on the acid levels of the solution. The indicator is added to the grape juice followed by incremental amounts of the alkaline solution as the wine changes color until adding more of the solution ceases to promote a color change. At this point the wine has been neutralized with the amount of the alkaline solution needed to neutralize calculated in a formula to give an indication of how much tartaric acid was in the wine. The TA level is then expressed in a percentage of grams per 100 milliliter. As with must weight, the ideal levels for ripeness will vary according to wine style and winemaking preference. For still table wines, TA levels often fall between 0.60-0.80% for red wine grapes and 0.65-0.85 for whites.

==== pH level ====
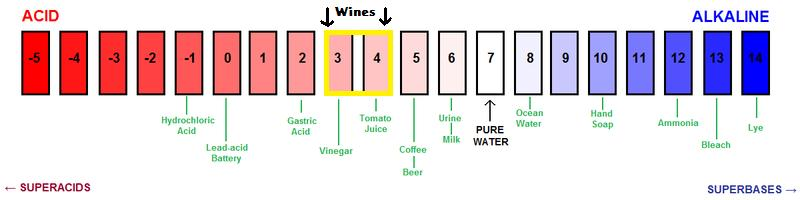
The pH levels for most wine fall between 3 and 4 on the pH scale.

The pH level of a wine is the measurement of the amount of free (H+) hydrogen ions. It is related to the titratable acidity level of a wine but differs in significant ways. Low pH numbers indicate a high concentration of acids in a solution. While pure water is neutral with a pH of 7, wine tends to be more acidic with a pH between 3 and 4. As the acid levels in ripening grapes fall, the concentration of acids are lessening which means the pH level is rising. Yeasts, bacteria, phenolic compounds such as anthocyanins which influence color all have varying tolerance to wines with high pH levels. In general, wines with high pH value tend to have duller colors and less developed flavors and be more prone to wine faults caused by spoilage organisms which makes monitoring the pH levels of grapes during ripening a priority for viticulturists and winemakers.

While the rudimentary method of testing pH is to expose the grape juice to a pH indicator such as the strips used for a standard litmus test, the results are usually not as detailed and accurate as what is needed to evaluate ripeness. Therefore, most wineries will us a pH meter that can give readings to an accuracy of plus or minus 0.1. As with sugars and acids, the ideal pH levels to determine ripeness will vary. For white wines, winemakers often look for pH readings between 3.1 and 3.2, while would be a maximum of 3.4. If the pH is too high, it may be a sign that the grapes are overripe (or that the soil has too much potassium which will also influence pH readings). While there are risks to letting the pH go too high, winemakers can counter high pH by adding more tartaric or malic acid during the winemaking. However, many viticulturists and winemakers uses pH readings as a strong boundary line for when to start the harvest.

==== Balancing sugar, acidity and pH ====
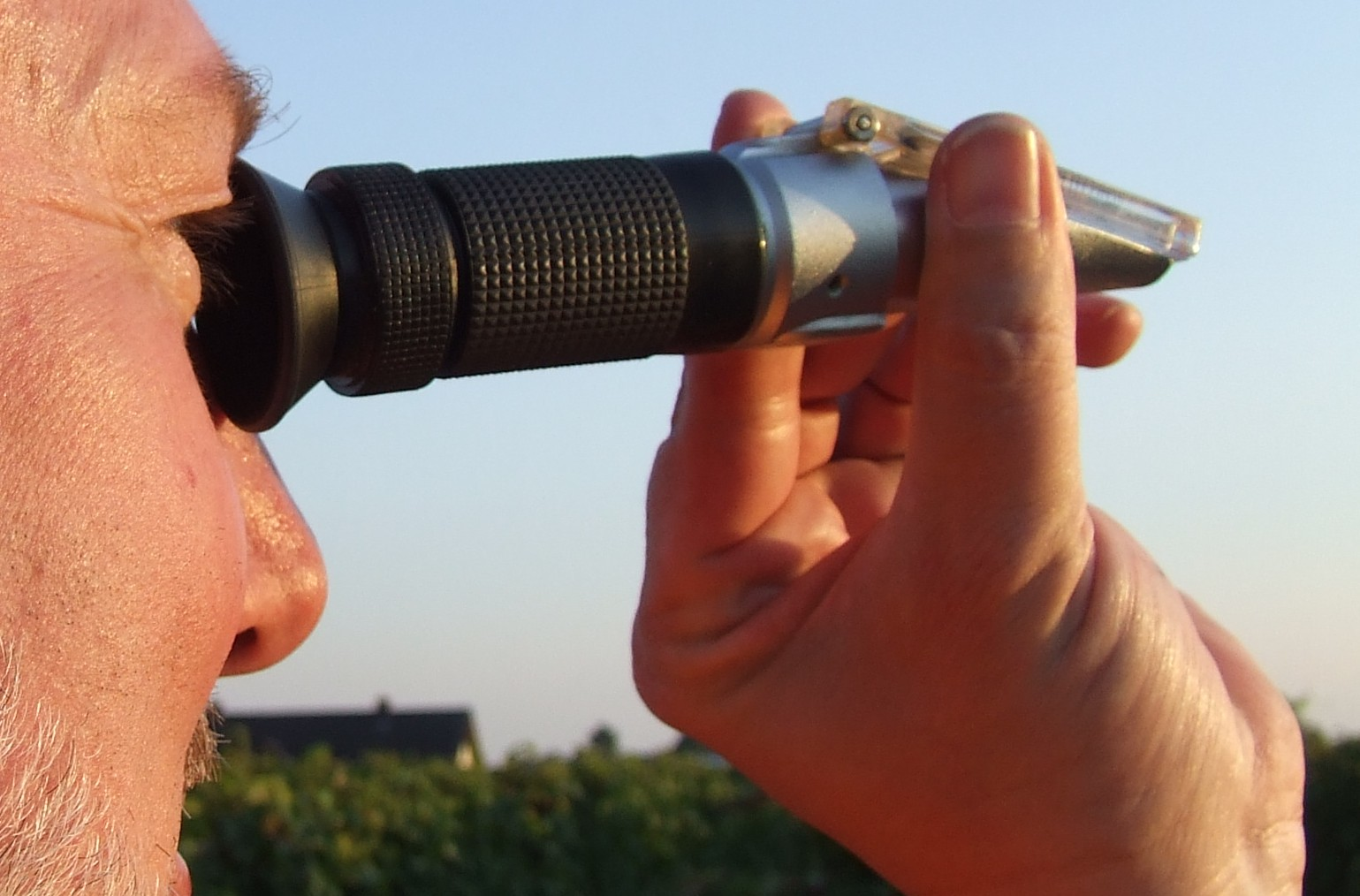
Winemakers use a refractometer on samples of grapes picked in the vineyard to measure sugar levels while determining ripeness.

The most ideal situation for a viticulturist or winemaker is to have the sugar, acidity and pH levels to be perfectly balanced at the time of harvesting. One hypothetical ideal for still red table wine is to have grape measurements reading 22 Brix, 0.75 TA and 3.4 pH. As author and winemaker Jeff Cox notes, these numbers are the "royal flush" poker hand of winemaking that is rarely dealt to winemakers. With all the variables of climate, vineyard soils, grape varieties, vineyard management and the general characteristics of the vintage, winemakers learn to find a compromise between all these component readings and select the point of ripeness that is most align with their vision for the end product wine.

There are several formulas that viticulturist and winemakers can use that utilize the various measurements of sugar, acid and pH level. One method developed by researchers at the University of California-Davis is the Brix:TA ratio which uses the ratio of brix degrees to the TA measurements. For example, a wine with 22°Bx and .75 TA will have almost a 30:1 Brix:TA ratio. According to the Davis researchers, the most balanced table wines tend to have a Brix to TA ratio between 30:1 - 35:1. Another method is to multiply the pH reading by itself and then multiply that number by the Brix reading. Using this method, when white wine grapes gets close to 200 and red wine grapes close to 260, it can be a good rule of thumb of when to harvest. For example, white wine grapes have a pH of 3.3 and Brix of 20, after going through that formula they will have a finally number of 217.80 which is well within an acceptable harvest range for some winemakers.

=== Physiological ripeness ===
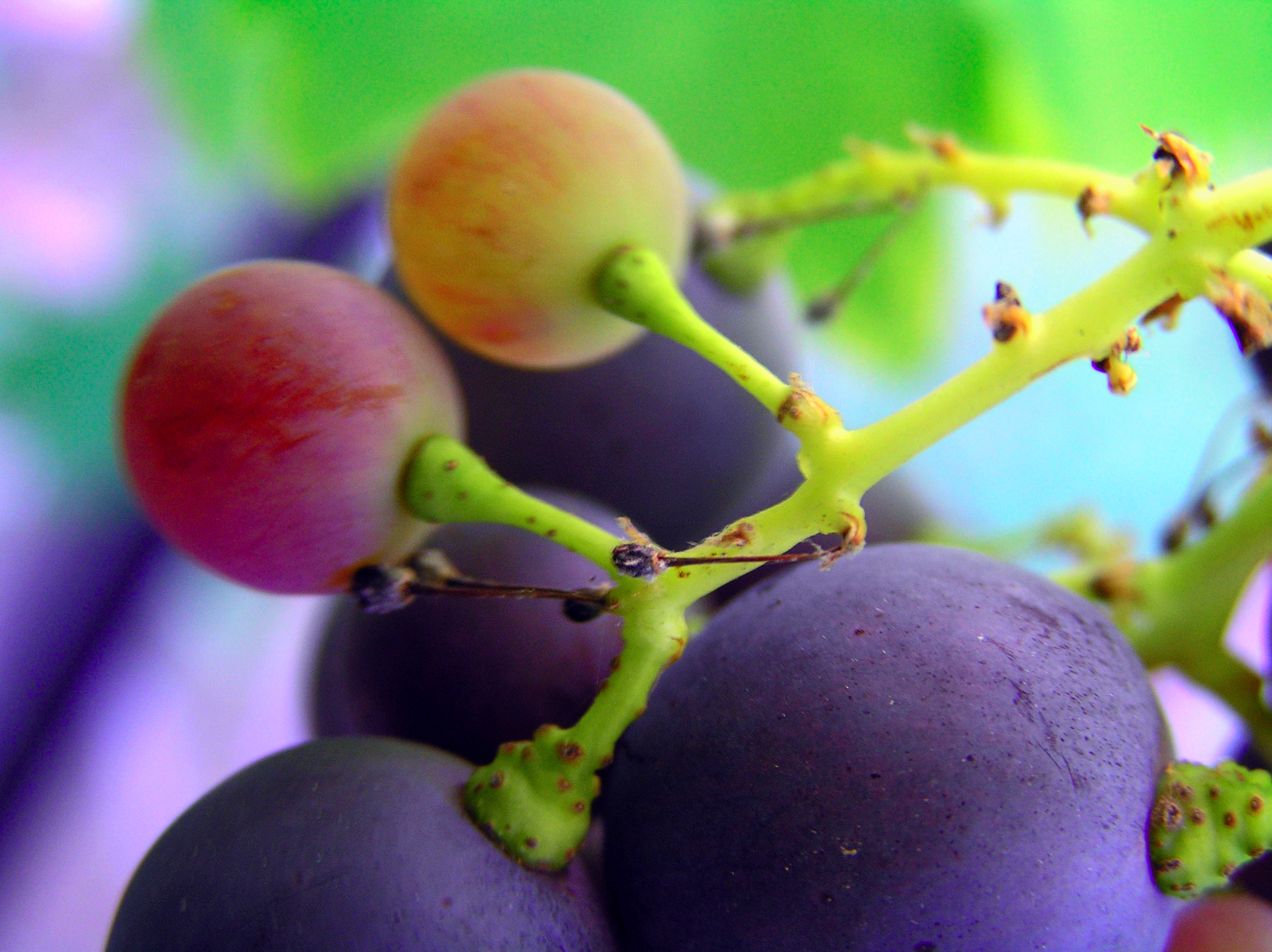
In determining physiological ripeness, winemakers will observe the lignification of the grape stems as they turn from being flexible and green to hard, woody and brown.

The idea of physiological ripeness (or physiological maturity) of grapes is a relatively recent addition to the discussion of ripeness in viticulture and winemaking. It is a broad category of factors in the development of ripening grapes that affect a wine's quality beyond the standard measurements of sugars, acids, and pH. These factors generally include evaluating the ripeness of tannins as well as the development of other phenolic compounds that contribute to the color, flavor, and aroma of wine. In many ways, the concept of physiological ripeness is similar to the French notion of engustment (from the Latin root gustus or taste), the stage of ripening when aroma and flavor become apparent. Research has shown that most aroma compounds develop in the berry in glycosylated form as secondary metabolites which occur late in ripening as the buildup of sugars have leveled. This stage is distinct from the sugar/acid interactions of ripening because it is possible for a grape to be "ripe" in the context of sugar and acid levels but still be very immature when it comes to the development of tannins, aromas and flavor that are characteristic of a complex or quality wine.

For the most part, many of these qualities are difficult to objectively measure so evaluation of the physiological ripeness of grapes is centered around observing and physically sampling the grapes. With experience winemakers and viticulturists learn to associate certain taste and characteristics with different stages of development. They evaluate the skin and pulp texture of the berry as well as the color of skins, seeds and stems. If the seeds are still green, the tannins inside the grape are more likely to be harsh and bitter. As the tannins continue to develop, the seeds start darkening in color. They will observe the lignification of the stems as they turn from being flexible and green to hard, woody and brown (for many varieties but not all) indicating that vine has completed its work in developing its "offspring" grape clusters and has started to store carbohydrates and resources for its next growing season. During the ripening period winemakers and viticulturists will continually sample grapes throughout the vineyard in the weeks and days leading up to harvest.

==== Flavor precursors and glycosides ====
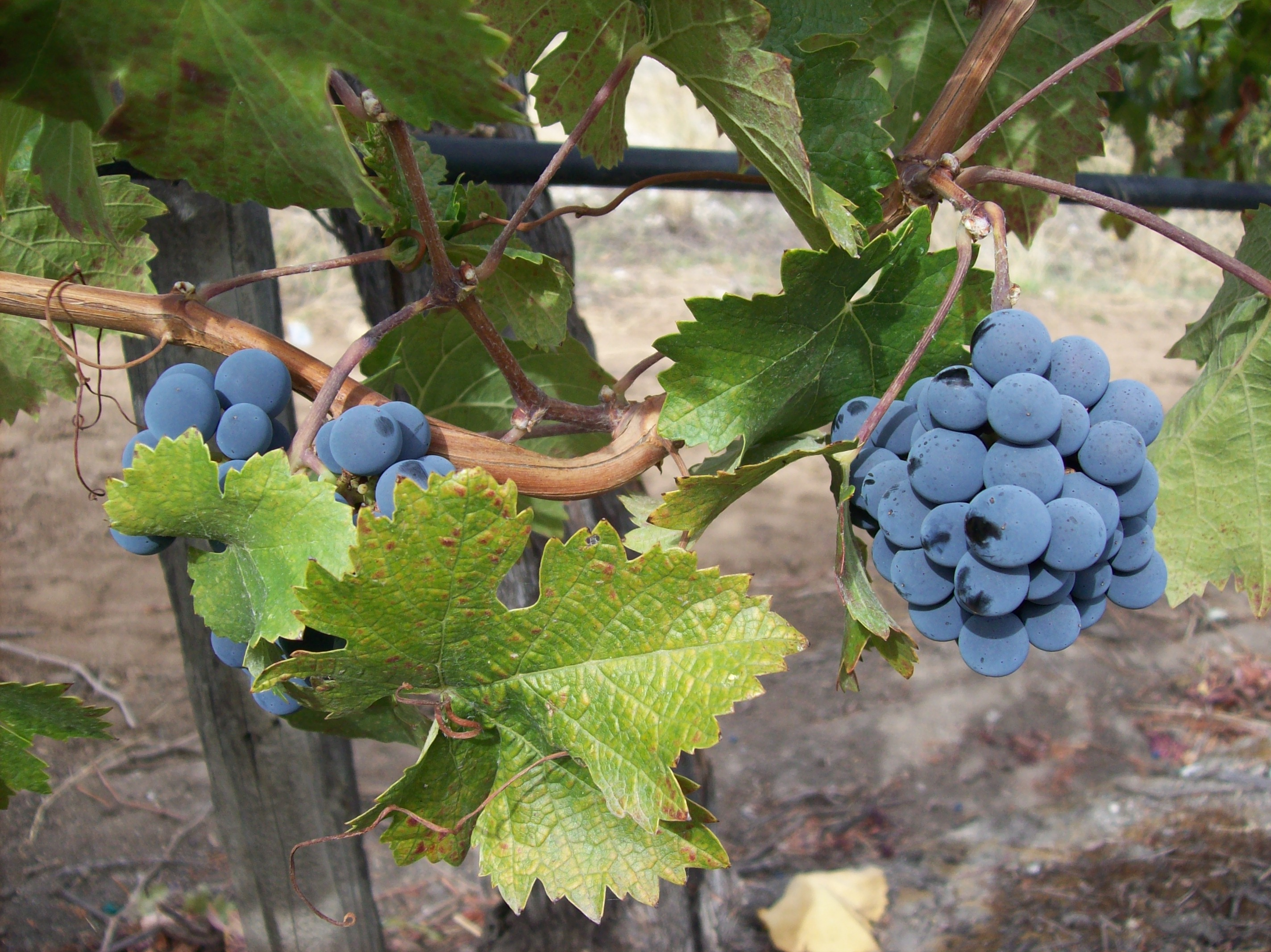
Researchers in the wine industry are developing new ways to objectively measure ripeness.

While it is difficult to objectively measure the qualities of physiological ripeness, researchers in the wine industry have been continuing pursuing methods that give some indication of the grapes development in these areas. For instance, some wineries have started using near infrared (NIR) spectroscopy to determine the concentration of color producing anthocyanins in the skins of grapes. A sizable amount of research has gone into studying methods to determine the presence of flavor precursors and glycosides in the ripening grapes.

Recently, similar methods to determine chlorophyll content in leaves non-destructively have been applied to measuring anthocyanin content. There are now a couple of optical absorbance instruments available commercially which are designed to measure and compute an index value that correlates highly with the actual amount of anthocyanin content in a sample. To use with grapes, the skin is removed and placed across the sensor of the meter. Measurements take only a second or two. These Anthocyanin Content Meters use an additional Near Infra-Red (NIR) signal, which takes into account the thickness of the sample, along with the absorbance wavelength to calculate a very accurate index value which is repeatable and consistent enough for comparative testing. A new method just being explored is to dip a piece of filter paper into a solution/sample to be measured and put that across the sensor head as the test sample. There have been positive reports on the second method, but they have not been published.

Flavor precursors are flavorless compounds that occur naturally in grapes as the result of normal metabolic activity of the grape vine. They are more abundant in grapes than the phenolic compounds known as flavonoids, and include compounds such monoterpenes, which contributes to the floral aroma of Riesling and Muscat, and methoxypyrazine, which contributes to the "green-bell pepper" aroma associated with Cabernet Sauvignon and Sauvignon blanc. When these components are "free" they are known as "flavor compounds" but when they combine with sugars in the grapes, they become glycosides or "flavor precursors". These compounds are found in trace amounts, and measured in parts per trillion. Through the action of acids and enzymes, glucosides derived from the sugar in the grapes go through hydrolysis, creating glycosides. These compounds are released during the late stages of winemaking and aging, when they augment or enhance flavor compounds. Theoretically, grapes with more flavor precursors have the potential to produce higher quality wine.

Scientists have discovered it is possible to determine, to some extent, the presence of these compounds in the grape before harvest. One way is to measured with gas chromatograph-mass spectrometers. Another method is through analysis of the glycosyl-glucose assay. Through this method glycosides from the grape juice are isolated and then hydrolysized to yield glucose. The amount of glucose produced is then quantified and tabulated in results that are expressed as amount of glycosides in micromoles per liter or per grape berry. The relationship between the presence of glycosides in wine grapes and the potential for quality in the resulting wine is not exact science but this remains an area of continuing research and development.
