= Millerandage =

Problem in grape growing with berry size variations

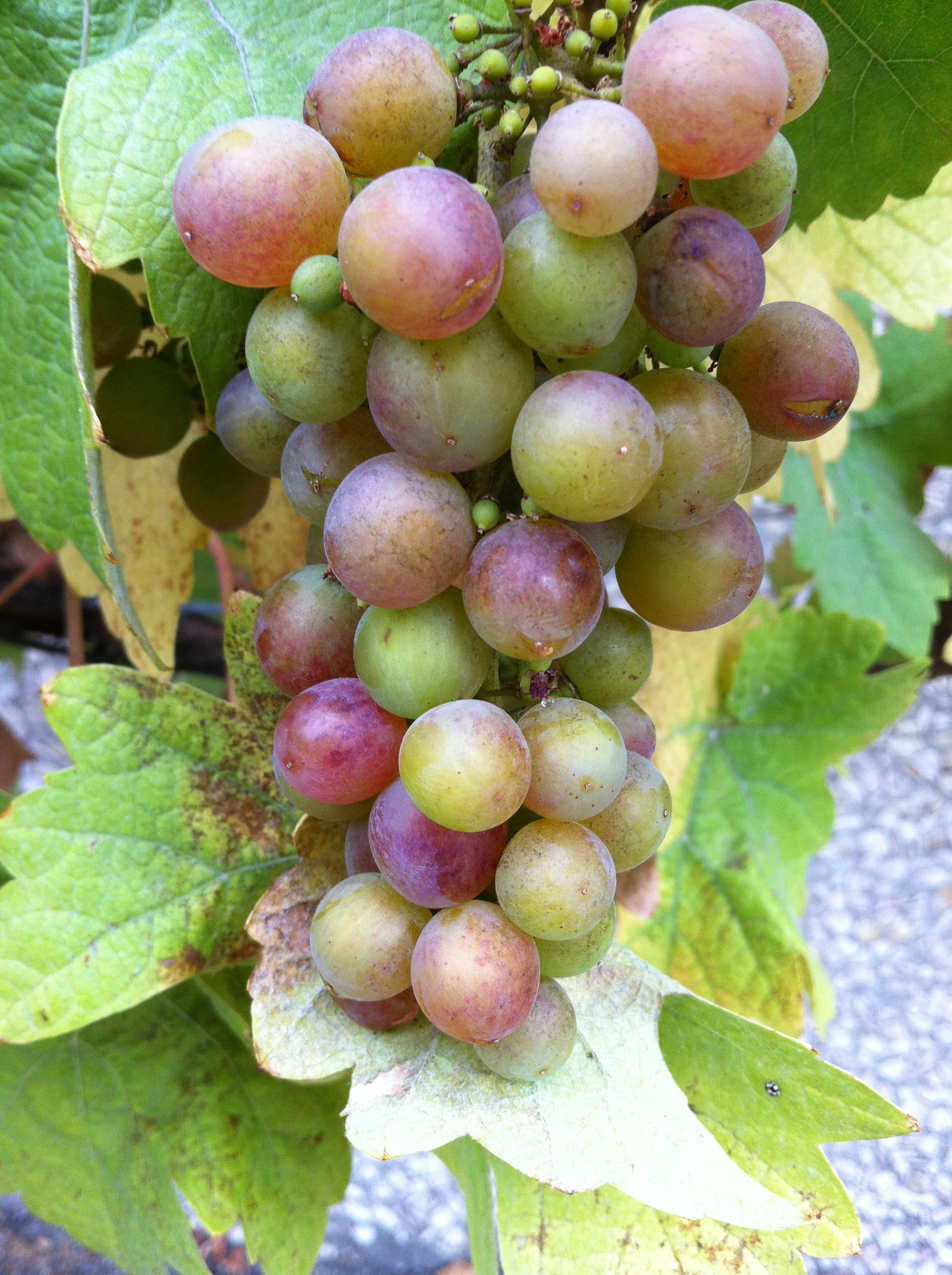
A grape cluster with signs of millerandage with small, immature berries scattered throughout the bunch.

Millerandage (or shot berries, hens and chicks and pumpkins and peas) is a potential viticultural hazard in which grape bunches contain berries that differ greatly in size and, most importantly, maturity. Its most common cause is cold, rainy or otherwise bad weather during the flowering stage of the vines though other factors, such as boron deficiency or fanleaf degeneration, may also play a role.

While millerandage always causes a drop in yield, its impact on wine quality varies, particularly by grape variety. For some varieties that are prone to uneven ripeness within a cluster, such as Sangiovese, Zinfandel and Gewürztraminer, the development of millerandage may be unfavorable due to "green flavors" from the potentially unripe grapes hidden within the cluster. For other varieties, such as Pinot noir or the Mendoza clone of Chardonnay, wine quality could be improved due to the reduced overall berry size and higher skin to juice ratio.

== Causes ==
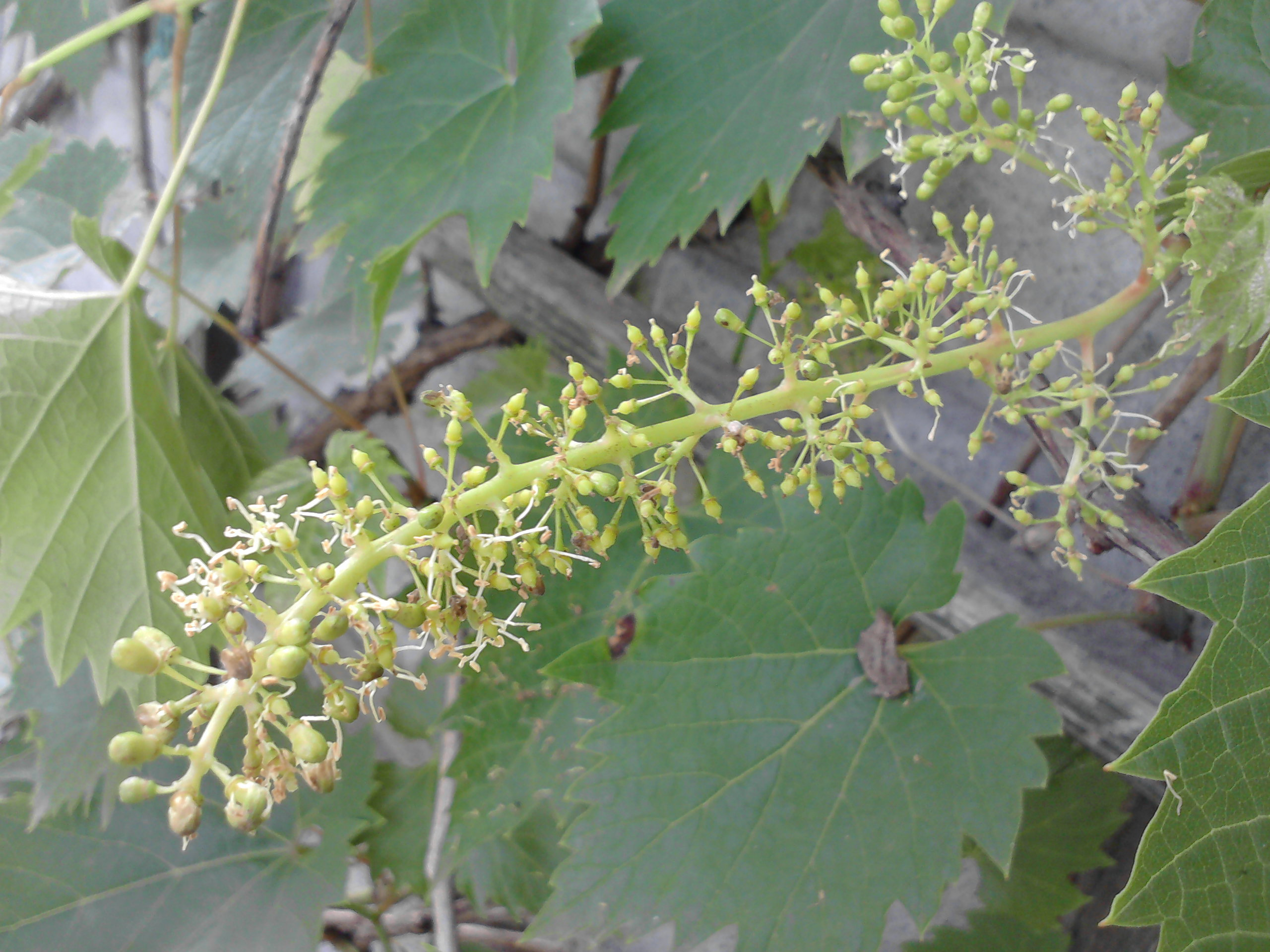
During the flowering (inflorescence) stage, cool temperature and the presence of rain can influence the development of millerandage.

The root cause of millerandage is the poor fertilization of grape flowers during the growing season. While this is most often attributed to bad weather, other factors such as nutritional deficiencies (particularly of the mineral boron which is needed to synthesis the growth hormone auxin and facilitate the movement of sugars in the vine) or viral infections can play a role.

=== Flowering and fruit set ===
For grapevines, flowering occurs usually 8 weeks after the beginning of bud break when the mean daily temperatures hit around 20 °C (68 °F). Usually flowering begins at the base of the inflorescence (cluster of flowers) and moves its way to the top. Following the apical dominance of grape vines, the uppermost shoots of the vine will begin flowering first with complete blooming taking place over 7 to 10 days. Ideally the temperature and weather condition for this period should be warm, sunny and dry to insure optimal flowering. For some varieties, such as Zinfandel and Merlot, flowering may be more staggered which poses a greater risk for inclement weather disrupting the process and encouraging millerandage. Some growers may try to encourage more synchronized flowering with the use of chemical treatments, such as cyanamide.

Following flowering, the flowers of the grape vine go through pollination and fertilization over the next 2 to 3 days. Here is another opportunity where incremental weather can influence the outcome with temperature drops below 10 °C (50 °F) potentially damaging the ovules of the flowers before they can be fertilized. Since grapevines are hermaphroditic (containing both male and female parts) and usually rely on self-pollination, the presence of wind to circulate pollen or insects usually doesn't influence the success or failure of the pollination stage. While not as influential as temperature, the presence of rain can "wash off" the pollen from the stigma or greatly dilute the stigmatic fluid, causing the pollen to absorb too much water, swelling and bursting before it reaches the ovules.

Grapes that develop millerandage will not have seeds, making them smaller and with potentially a higher juice to skin ratio which may be desirable in winemaking. However, these smaller berries may not fully ripen and could potentially add high acid and "green" flavors to the wine.

Even in the most ideal conditions, usually only 20–30% of flowers develop into mature fruit with fully developed seeds and auxin production. If even fewer berries develop, the condition of coulure emerges while for developed berries, the number of seeds (or their absence) will influence the resulting size of the berries. Millerandage most often occurs when the partially fertilized grapes do not develop any seeds, leaving small (and potentially immature) berries present in a cluster of larger, otherwise mature berries.

== Influence on wine quality ==
While millerandage will always have an economic impact in reduced harvest yields, it may not always have a negative impact on the resulting quality of the wine. In some areas, such as the New World wine regions of Australia, California and New Zealand, the presence of millerandage in the a vineyard can be seen as a positive quality for a vintage due to the reduced average berry-size. Some growers will even use chemical sprays to deliberately encourage millerandage.

However, the small, seedless berries may never fully ripen and stay hard and green (with high acid) throughout the growing season. Some growers may choose to remove clusters with high preponderance of millerandage through green harvesting or choose to harvest the entirety of the crop later at higher ripeness levels to balance the high acid and potentially "green flavors" of the shot berries. Other growers will remove the grape post-harvest at a sorting table along with other MOG.
