= Regent (grape) =

Variety of grape

- Grape (Vitis)
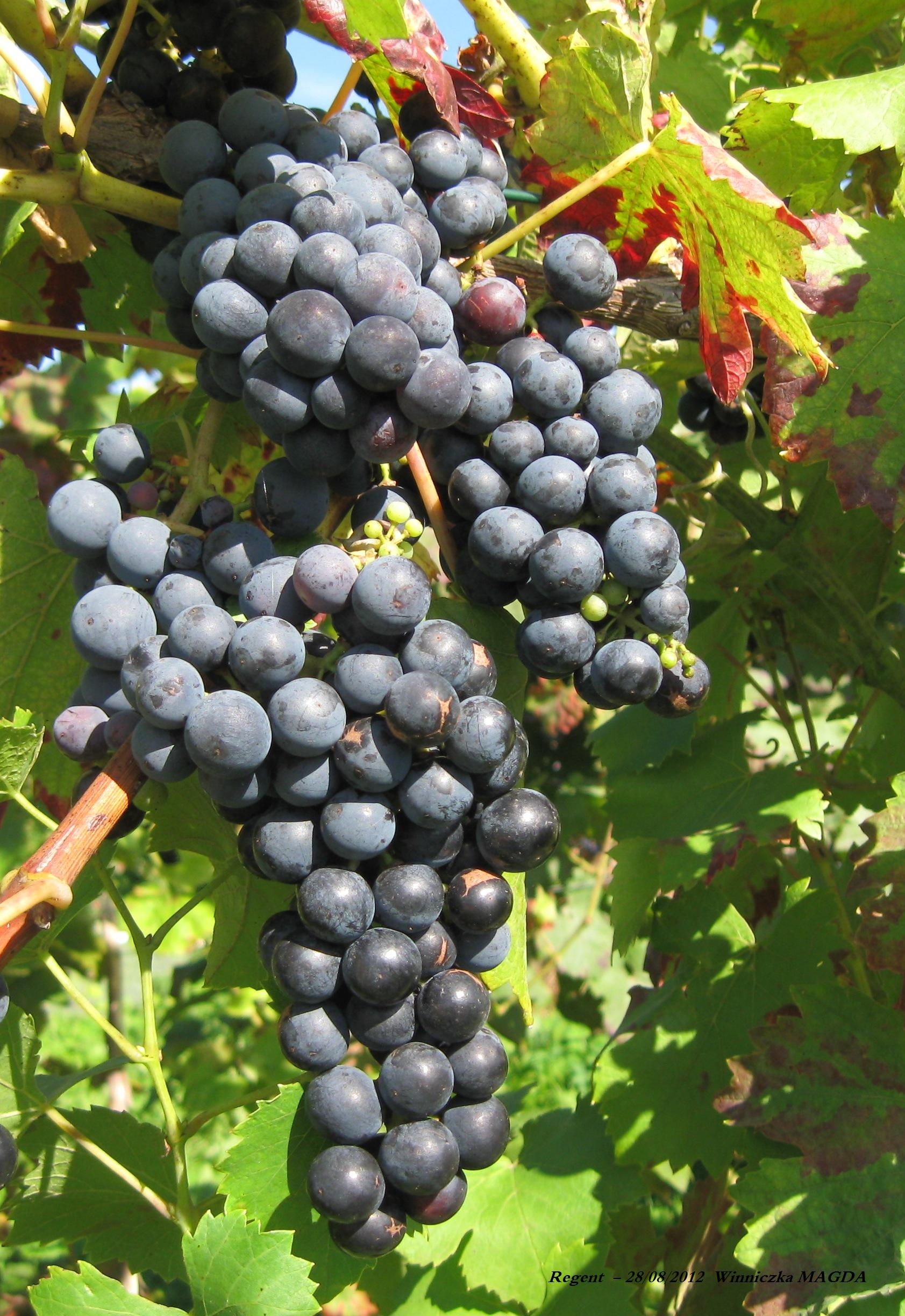
- Species: Interspecific crossing
- Also called: Geilweilerhof 67-198-3
- Origin: Siebeldingen, Palatinate, Germany
- Notable regions: Rheinhessen, Palatinate
- VIVC number: 4572

Regent is a dark-skinned inter-specific hybrid grape variety, used for making wine. It has both European (Vitis vinifera) and American vine species in its pedigree and a broad resistance against the most significant fungal diseases which affect grapes, such as downy mildew.

== History ==
Regent was created in 1967 by Professor Gerhardt Alleweldt at the Geilweilerhof Institute for Grape Breeding in Germany by crossing Diana, a Silvaner x Müller-Thurgau cross and thus a Vitis vinifera variety, with the interspecific hybrid Chambourcin. Experimental plantings followed in 1985, varietal protection was received in 1994 and it was released for cultivation in the first German region in 1996. It is at present among the most important new fungal-resistant quality grape variety world-wide, especially in German wine regions.

== Wine regions ==
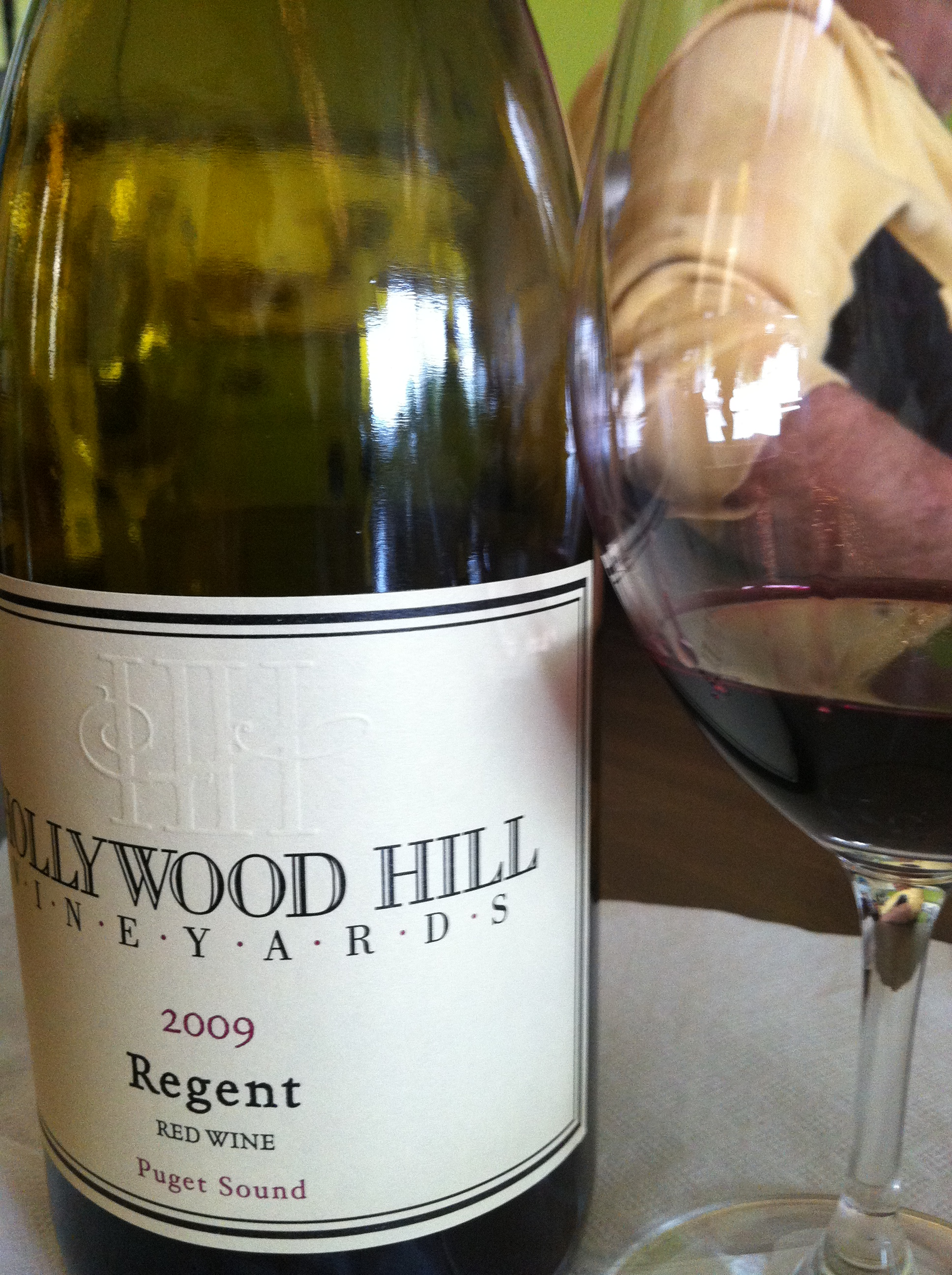
A Regent wine produced in the Puget Sound AVA of Washington State.

The cultivated area in Germany was 1,754 hectares (4,330 acres) in 2019, with a decreasing trend. This made it Germany's most cultivated hybrid grape variety. Regent is also grown in the United Kingdom with some success. In Belgium, it is authorised for all still wine AOCs : Côtes de Sambre et Meuse, Hageland, Haspengouw, and Heuvelland.

== Grape and grapegrowing ==
Regent is a cool-weather red winegrape. Regent provides medium-sized grapes and clusters. It is a heavy bearer, and has an upright growing habit that is similar to vinifera: It can be trained to the VSP (Vertical Shoot Positioning) method from canes tied to the low fruiting wire. It is a mid to late-season ripener. In some climates (e.g., NW Oregon USA), Regent often blooms during the last week of the Spring rains (which usually cease on or about July 5), and the blooms, if wet, are highly susceptible to Botrytis, which rots the flower clusters and prevents fruit set. This is the primary "Achilles Heel" of this otherwise impressive grape; a lesser disadvantage is its late ripening schedule. This grape would do best in a cool, dry area with a long growing season. Further north in upstate Washington, the vine buds and flowers later and this issue is less observed. Without preventive steps, Regent often yields no fruit in NW Oregon if Botrytis is not managed.

== Wines ==
Regent wines are colour intensive red wines with moderate acidity, can have rather much tannin and show aromas of cherries or blackcurrants. The wines often reach high alcohol levels since Regent tends to reach high must weights. Some German versions are matured in barriques. The grape is fairly easy to make good wine from. It has excellent skin color (perhaps so much that the color can seem overly vivid), and clean vinifera-type flavors.

== Synonyms ==
Regent is also known under its breeding code Geilweilerhof 67-198-3 or Gf. 67-198-3.

== See also ==
- List of grape varieties
