= Bracciola nera =

Variety of grape

Bracciola nera is a red Italian wine grape variety that is primarily found in the Liguria and Toscana wine regions of western Italy. The only Denominazione di origine controllata (DOC) that Bracciola nera plays a significant role is in the Colli di Luni DOC of Ligura where the grape is permitted to be blended with Sangiovese, Canaiolo, Pollera nera, Ciliegiolo, Vermentino nero and other varieties. A late-ripening variety, Bracciola nera usually contributes acidity to blends.

== History ==
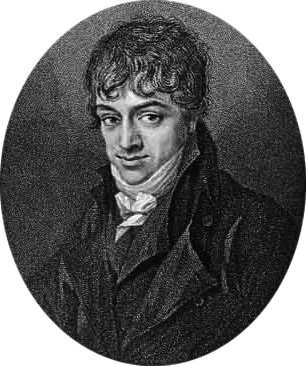
In 1825, the Italian naturalist Giuseppe Acerbi described Bracciola nera growing in the Cinque Terre region of Liguria.

In his posthumously published work Trattato della coltivazione delle viti, e del frutto che se ne puô cavare (1600), the Italian viticulturist Giovan Vettorio Soderini described a white grape variety, Bracciola, as one of the best white wine varieties being grown in Italy at the time. While ampelographers can't confirm if this is a white berry color mutation of Bracciola or a completely different variety, it can be confirmed that Bracciola nera was growing in the Cinque Terre region by at least the early 19th century when the Italian naturalist Giuseppe Acerbi described the grape, known locally as Braciola, growing in the region in 1825.

== Viticulture ==
Bracciola nera is a late-ripening grape variety that often has very high acid levels at harvest. The vine can be very productive and high yielding if not kept in check by winter pruning and green harvesting.

== Wine regions and DOC regulations ==
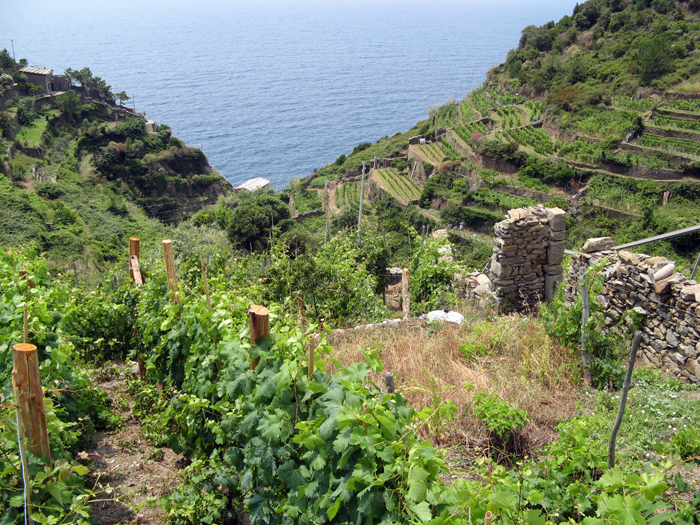
Bracciola nera is grown in the province of La Spezia which includes the terraced vineyards of Cinque Terre (pictured).

In 2000, there 110 hectares (270 acres) of Bracciola nera planted in Italy, nearly all of it in the province of Massa-Carrara in Tuscany and the province of La Spezia in Liguria where it is a permitted blending varietal in the DOC wine of Colli di Luna. Bracciola nera destined for DOC wine production is limited to a harvest yield of no more than 12 tonnes/hectare. The wine is predominantly Sangiovese (60-70%) with Pollera nera, Canaiolo and Ciliegiolo collectively needing to make up at least 15% of the blend. Bracciola nera, Colombana nera, Vermentino nero and other local red grape varieties are permitted to be used up to a maximum of 25% the wine.

== Synonyms ==
Over the years Bracciola nera has been known under a variety of synonyms including: Barciuola, Bracciola, Bracciula, Bracciuola, Braciola, Brassola, Brassora, Brazolata and Rappalunga.
