= Colombana =

Colombana is a name shared by several wine and table grape varieties including:

- Colombana nera
- Besgano bianco, which is also known as Colombana bianco
- Verdea (grape), which is also known as Colombana and Colombana bianco
