= San Colombano =

San Colombano is the Italian form of Saint Columbanus.

It may also refer to

== Ecclesiastical institutes ==
- Territorial Abbey of San Colombano, a territorial abbacy at Bobbio, in the province of Piacenza (Emilia-Romagna)
- San Colombano, Fanano, parish church
- Eremo di San Colombano, hermitage in Trentino
- Oratory of San Colombano, church in Bologna

== Italian places ==
- San Colombano al Lambro, a comune (municipality) in the Italian Province of Milan (Lombardy)
- San Colombano Belmonte, a comune in the Italian Province of Turin (Piedmont)
- San Colombano Certenoli, a comune in the Italian Province of Genoa (Liguria)
- A frazione of Scandicci in the Italian Province of Florence (Tuscany)

== Wine grapes ==
- San Colombano, another name for the Italian wine grape Verdea
- San Colombano Piccolo, another name for the Italian wine grape Besgano bianco
