= Montecchio (disambiguation) =

Montecchio is a municipality in Umbria, Italy.

Montecchio may also refer to the following places in Italy:

- Montecchio Emilia, Emilia-Romagna
- Montecchio Maggiore, Veneto
- Montecchio Precalcino, Veneto
- Montecchio, Peccioli, Tuscany
- Montecchio Vesponi, Tuscany
- Sant'Andrea a Montecchio, Tuscany
- Treia, Marche, known in the Middle Ages as Montecchio
- Fort Montecchio-Lusardi, Lombardy

== See also ==
- Montecchi
- Montecchia
