= Libbiano =

Libbiano may refer to:

- Libbiano, Peccioli, a village in the province of Pisa, Italy
- Libbiano, Pomarance, a village in the province of Pisa, Italy
