= Pieve di San Verano, Peccioli =

Coordinates: 43.54767°N 10.72036°E

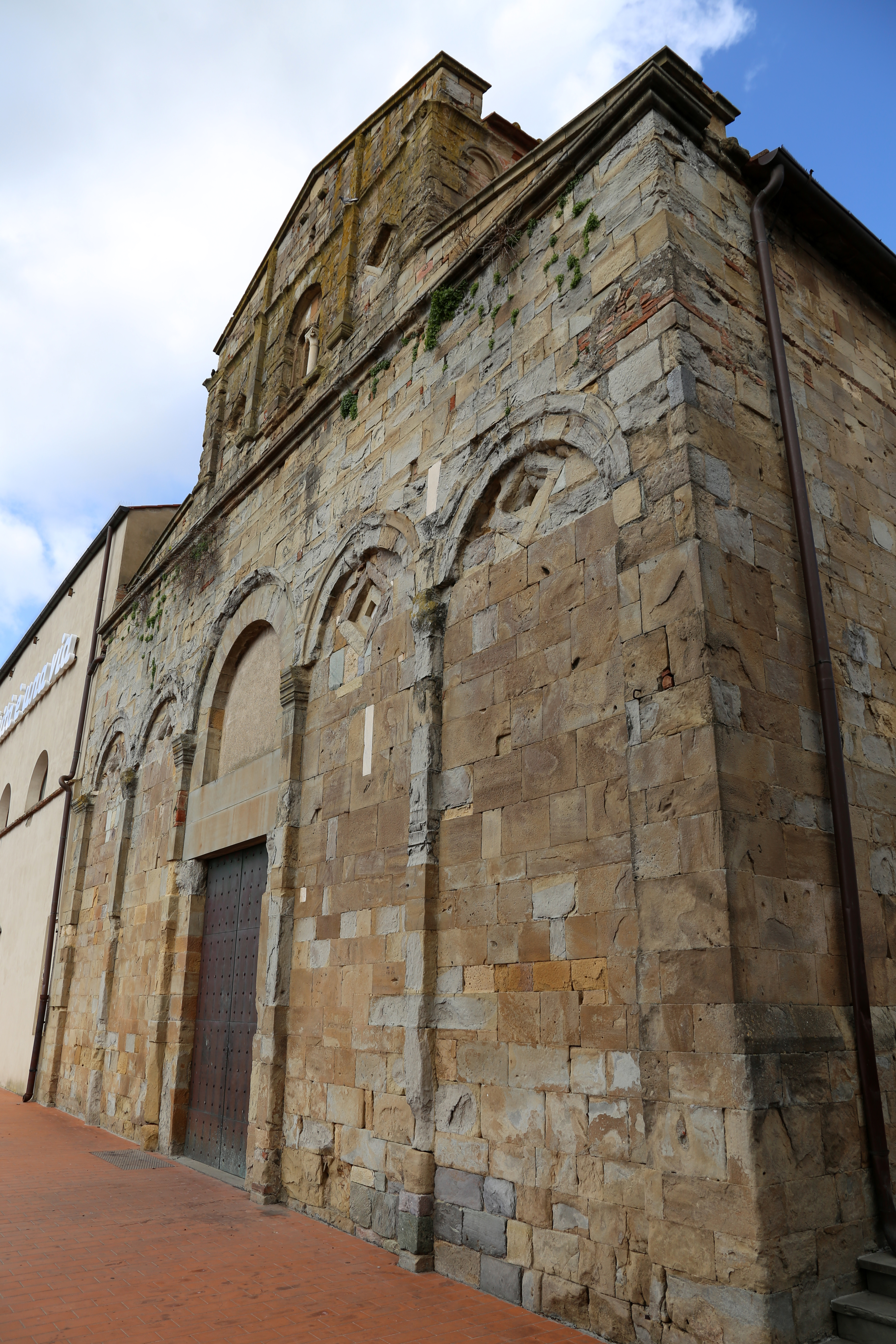
West facade of church

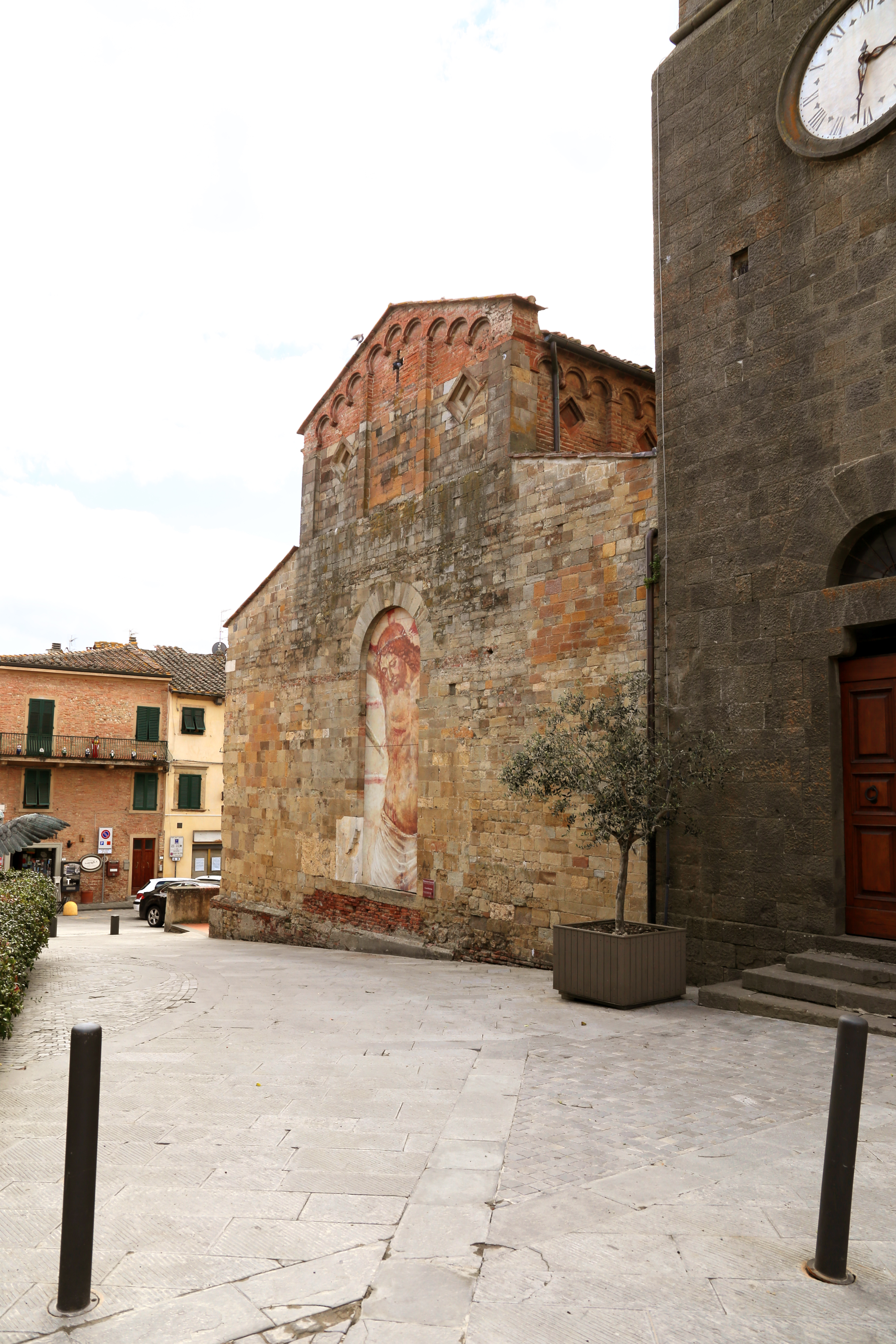
East wall of apse of church with base of bell tower to right

The Pieve di San Verano is a Roman Catholic, Romanesque-style, formerly-rural parish church now located in on Piazza Popolo #1 in the historic center of Peccioli, province of Pisa, region of Tuscany, Italy. The church is dedicated to Veranus of Cavaillon.

== Description ==
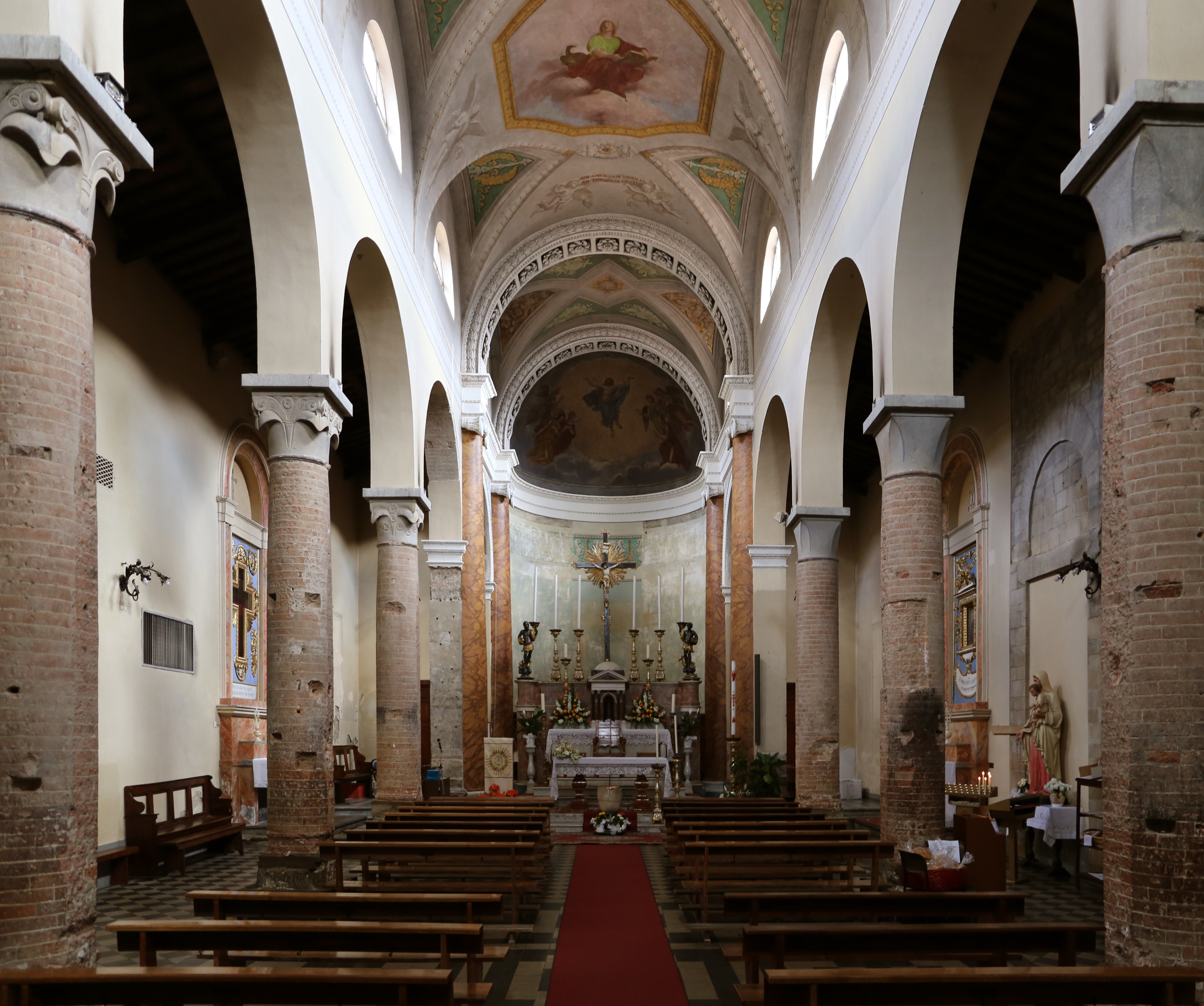
Interior view towards main altar

A church at this site is first reliably documented by 1171 in a papal bull by Alexander III. The church layout seen today dates to the 12th-13th centuries. Originally it was located outside of the castle walls, but later as the medieval town grew, so did walls around this area.

In 1580, two chapels were added to the church, that of the Holy Sacrament and that of the Virgin of the Assumption. In 1688, after a procession, a fire destroyed the altar, nave roof, and organ. Reconstruction led to a reconsecration in 1692. Further refurbishments took place over the following centuries. In 1811, a portico that had been added to the facade was razed. Between 1831 and 1834, the mullioned windows were sealed. The interior received plaster covering. A restoration in 1930 attempted to restore the look to a more Romanesque state. In 2009, the Chapel of the Compagnia dell'Assunta (Fraternity of the Virgin of the Assumption) was converted into the Museo d’Arte Sacra of Peccioli.

The main facade has sealed arches. The Romanesque bell-tower was rebuilt in 1885 by the architect Luigi Bellincioni. The interior is divided into three naves by 8 brick columns with Romanesque capitals and bases. The ceiling of the nave and of the apse are frescoed. On the left wall is a depiction of St Verano of Cavillon (1854) by Andrea Sorbi.

== Museo di Arte Sacra ==
Among the works housed in this museum are:

- Madonna and child with two angels attributed to 13th-century painter Enrico di Tedice
- Life of St Nicola attributed to 13th-century Michele di Baldovino
- Wooden Crucifix (14th-century) by Sienese sculptor
- Madonna and Child with Saints Verano, James the Major, Monica, and Catherine (1463) by Neri di Bicci
- Virgin in Glory with angels and Saints Roch, Verano, Francis, and Charles Borromeo attributed to a Tuscan painter
- Crucifixion with Virgin and Saints Anthony Abbott, Francis, Mary Magdalen, John the Evangelist, and Sebastian (17th-century) attributed to a Tuscan painter
- Assumption of the Virgin with Saints Bartholemew, Verano, John the Evangelist, Thomas, and Catherine of Alexandria (1628) by Giovanni Bilivert
- Presentation al Temple, Assumption of the Virgin, Flight to Egypt (second half of 17th-century) attributed to a Tuscan painter
- St Nicola of Tolentino (17th-century) attributed to Tuscan painter
- St Agatha (17th-century) attributed to a Tuscan painter
- Saint Apollonia, 17th-century by a Tuscan painter
- Saints John the Baptist, Augustine, Andrew, and Moses (1673) by Simone Pignoni, removed from local former church of the Madonna del Carmine
- St Peter (18th-century) attributed to Giovanni Battista Piazzetta
