= Biancone =

Biancone is the name or a synonym of several French and Italian grape varieties including:

- Biancone Gentile, also known as Biancu Gentile, on the island of Corsica
- Biancone blanc, also known as Biancone di Portoferraio on the island of Elba
- Biancone dell'Antella
- Biancone della Pieve
- Mostosa, an Italian variety also known as Biancone
- Rollo (grape), an Italian variety also known as Biancone
- Trebbiano, an Italian variety also known as Biancone
