= Bellincioni =

Bellincioni is an Italian surname. Notable people with the surname include:

- Bernardo Bellincioni (1452–1492), Italian poet
- Gemma Bellincioni (1864–1950), Italian opera singer
- Luigi Bellincioni (1842–1929), Italian architect and engineer
