= Legoli =

- Frazione
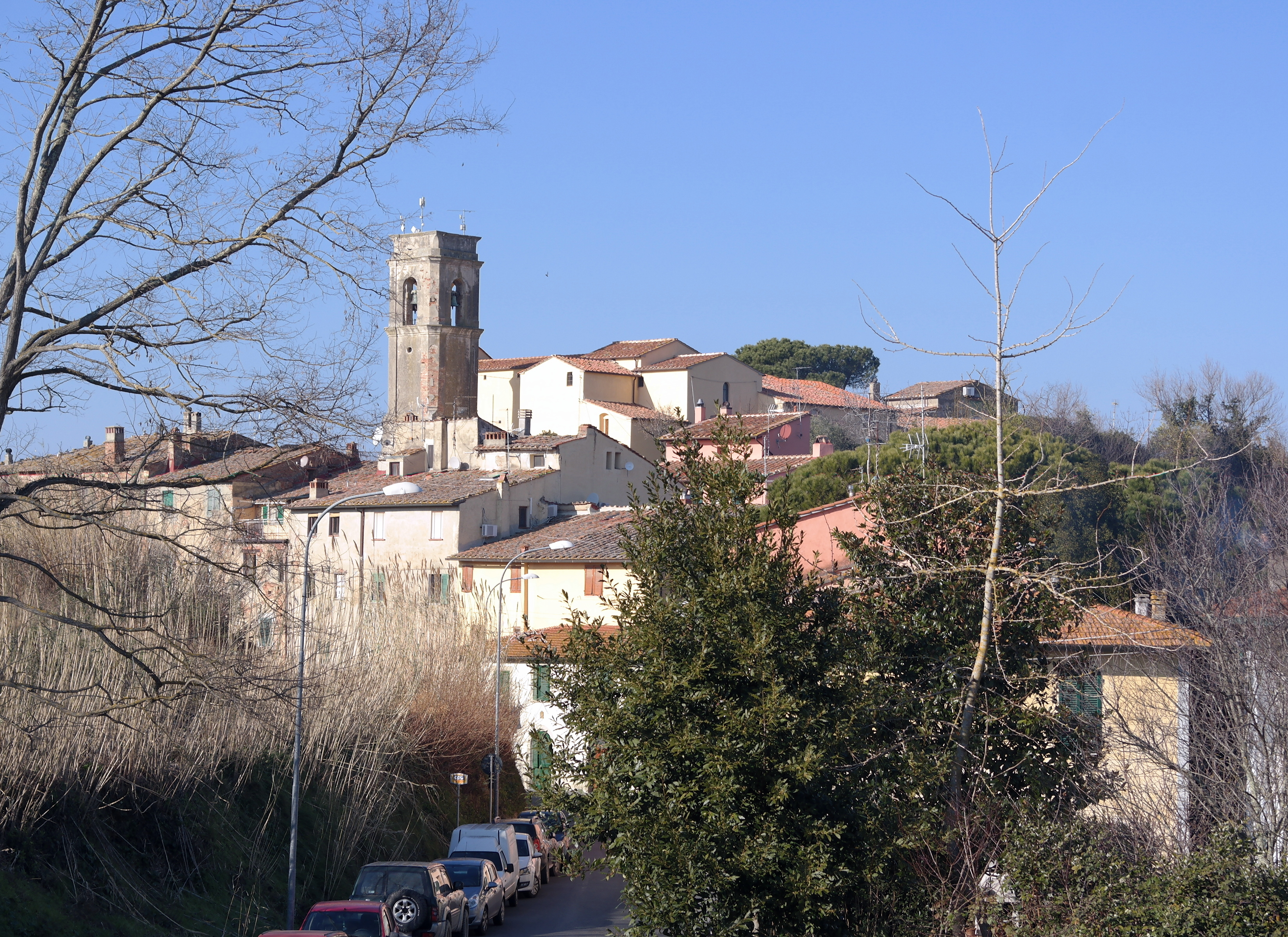

- Location of Legoli in Italy
- Coordinates: 43°34′20″N 10°47′42″E
- Country: Italy
- Region: Tuscany
- Province: Pisa (PI)
- Comune: Peccioli
- Elevation: 194 m (636 ft)

Population (2001)
  - Total: 259
- Demonym: Legolesi
- Time zone: UTC+1 (CET)
  - Summer (DST): UTC+2 (CEST)
- Postal code: 56037
- Dialing code: (+39) 0587

Legoli is a village in Tuscany, central Italy, administratively a frazione of the comune of Peccioli, province of Pisa.

== Census ==
At the time of the 2001 census its population was 259.
