= Colline Lucchesi =

Italian controlled wine origin in Tuscany

Colline Lucchesi is a denominazione di origine controllata (DOC) for wine, created in 1968, that is located in northern Tuscany, Italy, and centered near the commune of Lucca.

== Geography ==
This DOC is broken into two near but nonadjacent areas that envelop Lucca and are separated by the Serchio River. The western (and larger) portion of the DOC reaches Pescaglia in the north and Massarosa to the west, while the eastern portion of the DOC abuts Pescia to the east, Villa Basilica to the north and Capannori and Porcari to the south.

The soil of Colline Lucchesi is often composed of clay mixed with gravel, and many of the parcels in this area favor the production of Merlot. Both sections of the DOC are at the foot of the Apennine Mountains.

== History ==
The wine has a long history; based on medieval records, it is known that the wine of this region was favored by the medieval lords of Lucca, Florence and Pisa. Recognition of the denomination of origin wines Colline Lucchesi and revocation of designation of origin of wines of “Rosso delle Colline Lucchesi” or “Colline Lucchesi rosso” and “Bianco delle Colline Lucchesi” or “Colline Lucchesi bianco” was granted in 1997.

== DOC Regulations ==
Colline Lucchesi is allowed to make bianco and rosso styles of wine, as well as certain varietal wines and vin santo. The bianco blend is allowed to be complex and flexible, but is Trebbiano dominated. It is 45% to 70% Trebbiano Toscano; up to 45% Greco, Grechetto, Vermentino and/or Malvasia; up to 30% Chardonnay and/or Sauvignon blanc and up to 15% other white varieties.

The DOC also allows two white varietal wines, Vermentino and Sauvignon Blanc. These varietal wines must have at least 85% of the variety stated on the bottle (e.g., Colline Lucchesi Sauvignon blanc).

The rosso blend is Sangiovese-dominated, and is composed of between 45% and 70% Sangiovese, up to 30% Canaiolo and/or Ciliegiolo, up to 15% Merlot and up to 15% other grape varieties, such as Vermentino nero, with Aleatico and Moscato only allowed to reach 5% of the blend. Like the bianco wines, the DOC allows two varietal wines: Merlot and Sangiovese. Riserva wines must be aged a minimum of two years.

== See also ==
- Sangiovese
- Toscana (wine)
