= Verdea (grape) =

Variety of grape

Verdea is a white Italian wine grape variety that originated in Tuscany but is today mainly grown in the Lombardy wine region of northern Italy. The grape is sometimes confused with the white Verdeca grape of the Apulia region and the French wine grape Verdesse from Savoy due to similarities in their names and synonyms. Verdea can be used to make a wide variety of wines, ranging from the late harvested Vin Santo to dry sparkling wines.

== History and relationship to other grapes ==
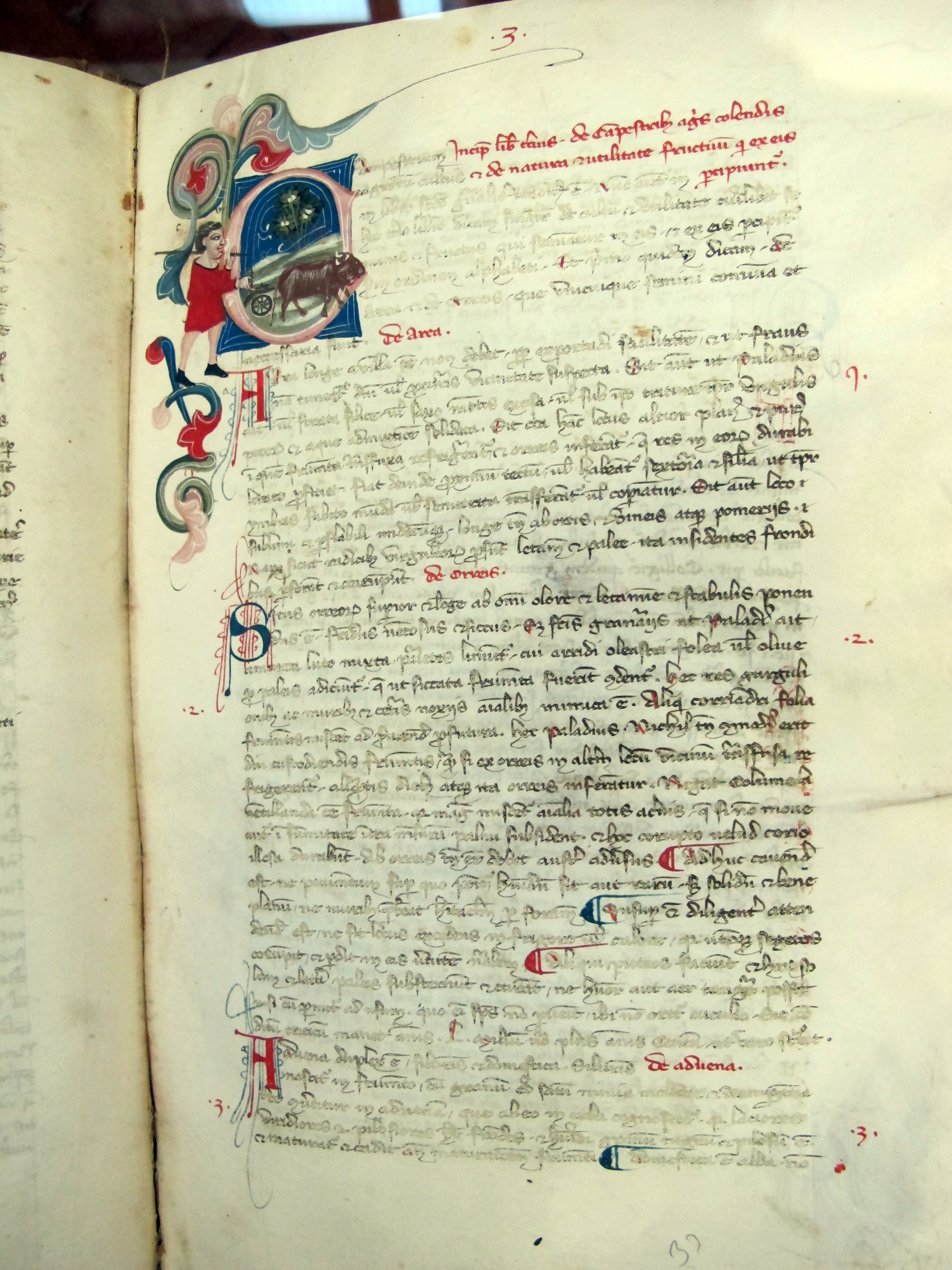
Verdea was one of the grape varieties mentioned in Pietro de' Crescenzi's historic 1303 account of viticulture in Italy.

The earliest mentioning of Verdea was by Pietro de' Crescenzi in his 1303 account of grape varieties growing in Tuscany. The grape was later described by Giovan Vettorio Soderini in his posthumously published work Trattato della coltivazione delle viti, e del frutto che se ne puô cavare (1600) as one of the Tuscan grape varieties that was much admired in the region.

In 2007, DNA analysis suggested that the red wine grape Sangiovese Forte may, in fact, be a color mutation of Verdea. This contradicted earlier DNA profiling from 2005 that concluded that Sangiovese Forte was a clone of the notable Tuscan wine grape Sangiovese.

== Viticulture ==
Verdea is a mid-ripening grape variety that is often allowed to hang on the vine late into the growing season when its concentrated sugars are desired for the production of dessert wines. The grape has good resistance to the viticultural hazard of botrytis bunch rot which is a benefit for late-harvest and passito wine production.

== Wine regions ==
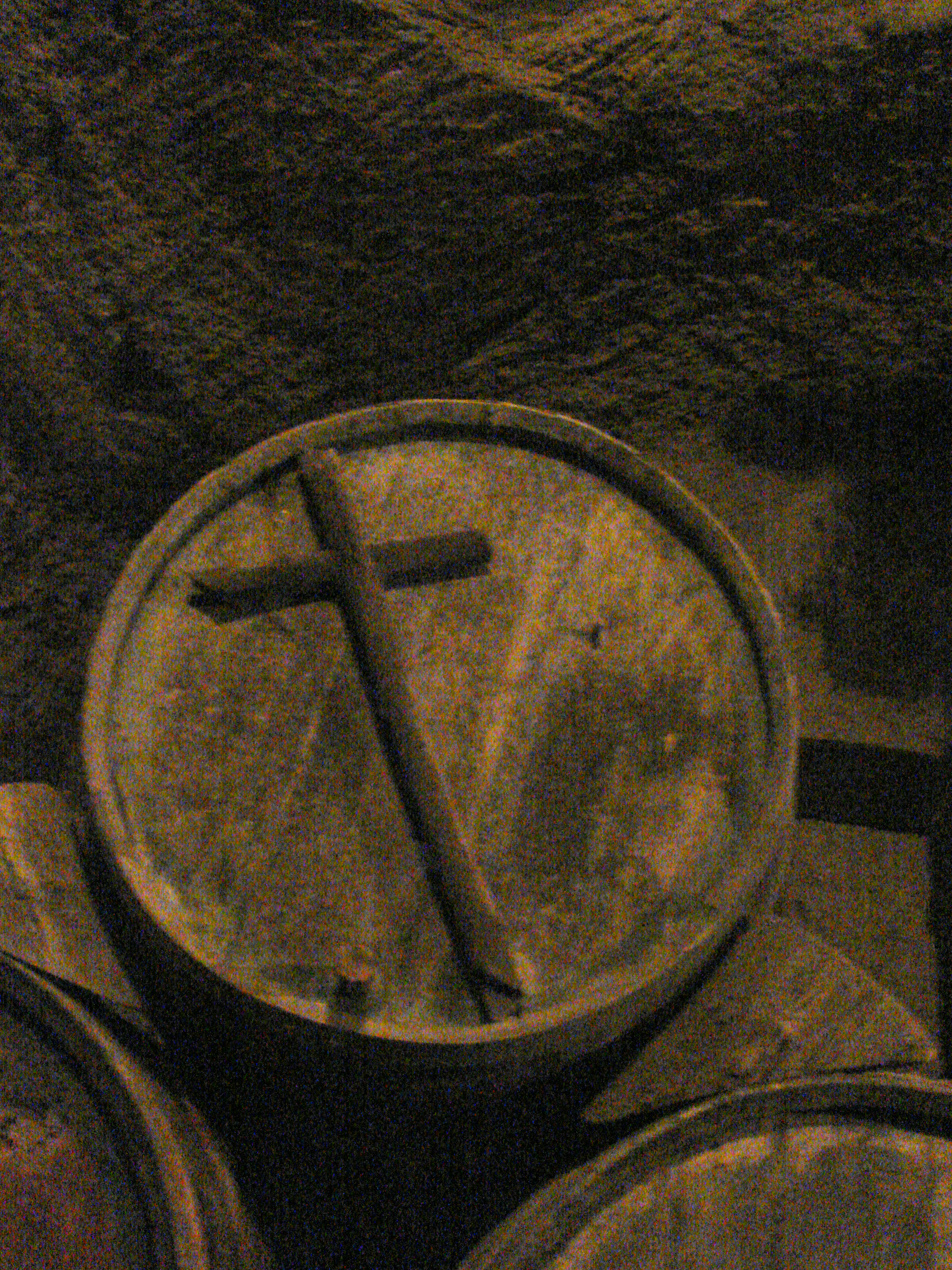
Verdea has historically been used as a blending grape in the production of Vin Santo.

In 2000, there were 152 hectares (380 acres) of Verdea growing in Italy, the vast majority of it in the Lombardy region around the village of San Colombano al Lambro in the province of Milan. Outside of Lombardy, the grape can also be found growing in the province of Pisa in Tuscany and in the province of Piacenza in the Emilia-Romagna region.

Up until the mid-20th century, Verdea was widely grown in the Trebbia valley between the cities of Genoa in Liguria and Piacenza in Emilia-Romagna where it was often blended with Malvasia bianca, Besgano bianco and Pizzutello in the production of Vin Santo. In the Val Nure region of Piacenza, the grape had a similar history of use for Vin Santo that gradually died out around the 1940s.

Today the grape is a permitted blending variety in several Denominazione di Origine Controllata (DOC) and Indicazione geografica tipica (IGT) zones including the Colline del Milanese in Lombardy.

== Styles ==
Verdea is a versatile wine grape that can be produced in a variety of styles ranging from sweet, late-harvest and passito style dessert wines (such as the notable Vin Santo wines) or as dry, sparkling wine. While often used as a blending variety (including with Riesling by at least one Italian producer in Lombardy), the grape can be made a varietal in both a sweet and dry style.

== Synonyms ==
Over the years, Verdea has been known under a variety of synonyms including: Colombana, Colombana bianca (in Tuscany), Colombana del Picciolli, Colombana di Peccioli (in Tuscany), Colombano, Doree d'Italia, Doree d'Italie, Gambo rosso, Paradisa, Paradisa di Bologne, Paradssiotto, Paradizia, S. Colombano, San Colombano, San Colombano Paradiso d'Italia, Sancolombana, Vardea, Verdea di Montalto, Verdecana and Verdicchio Giallo.
