= Barsaglina =

Variety of grape

Barsaglina is a red Italian wine grape variety that is grown in Tuscany and Liguria where it most often used to add color and tannins to blends. Some ampelographers speculate that grape may be related to Sangiovese due to morphological similarities. Barsaglina was near extinction until a Tuscan wine producer, Paolo Storchi, help revive the variety by making it a significant component of his red Indicazione Geografica Tipica (IGT) Toscana blend. The grape is also permitted to be used in the Denominazione di Origine Controllata (DOC) wines of Colli di Luni.

== History ==
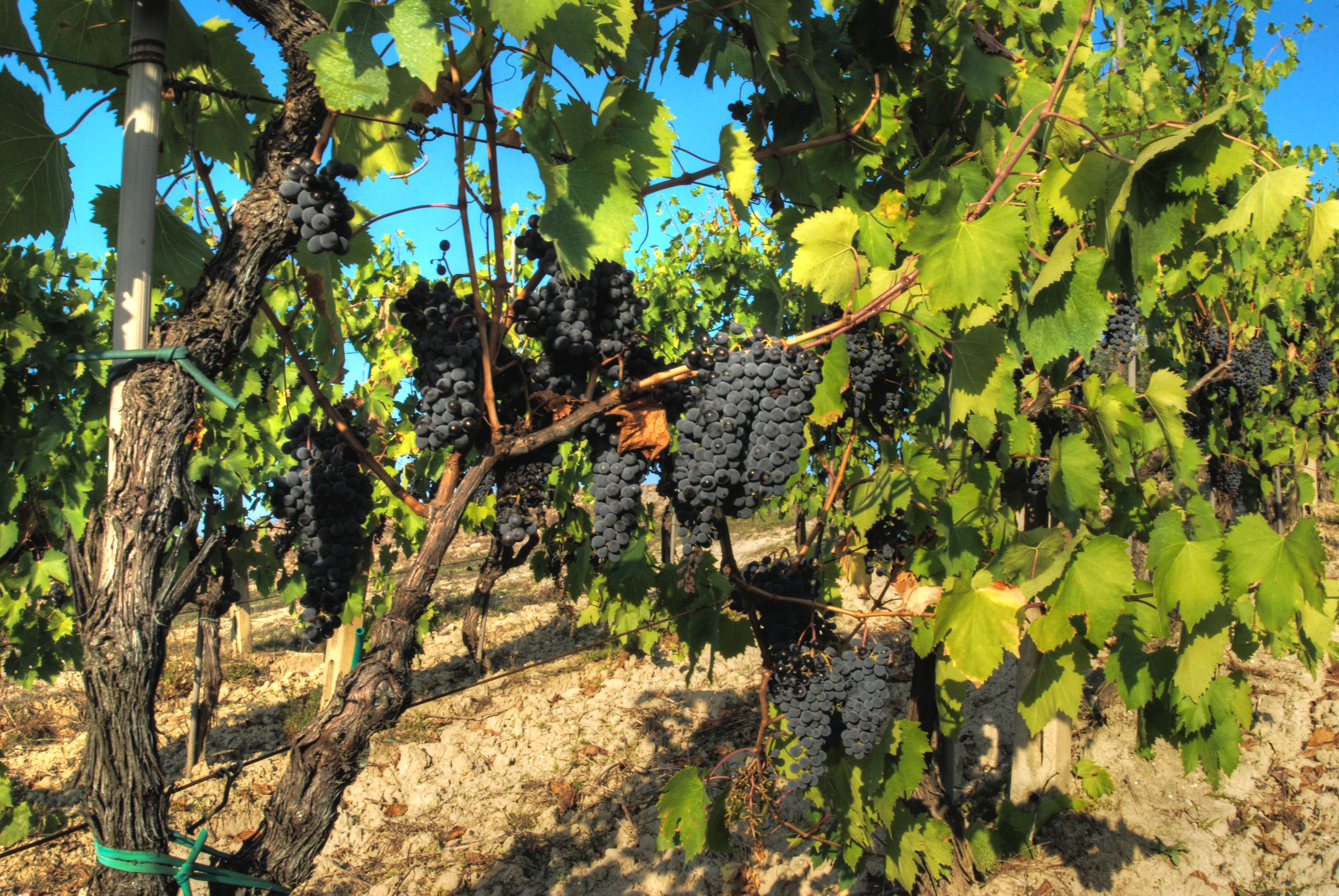
Ampelographers have noted the morphological similarities between Sangiovese (pictured) and Barsaglina which may suggest a close relationship between the two varieties.

Ampelographers believe that the Ligurian synonym Massaretta could be derived from the province of Massa and Carrara in Tuscany that borders Liguria and hints at the potential birthplace of Barsaglina. Morphological similarities in the vine, leaves and cluster of the variety has also suggested to some ampelographers that there may be a potential relationship with the notable Tuscan wine grape Sangiovese.

While Barsaglina has had a long history of cultivation around Carrara and Massa, the grape was on the verge of extinction in the late 20th century until a Tuscan wine producer, Paolo Storchi, revived plantings of the variety at his Podere Scurtarola estate (much the same way Storchi help revived Vermentino nero).

== Viticulture ==
Barsaglina is a mid-ripening grape variety that is often harvested near the end of September. The vine can be very vigorous and prone to producing a large canopy of foliage if not kept in check by pruning and canopy management techniques. Among the viticultural hazards that Barsaglina is most susceptible to is the fungal infection of powdery mildew.

== Wine regions ==
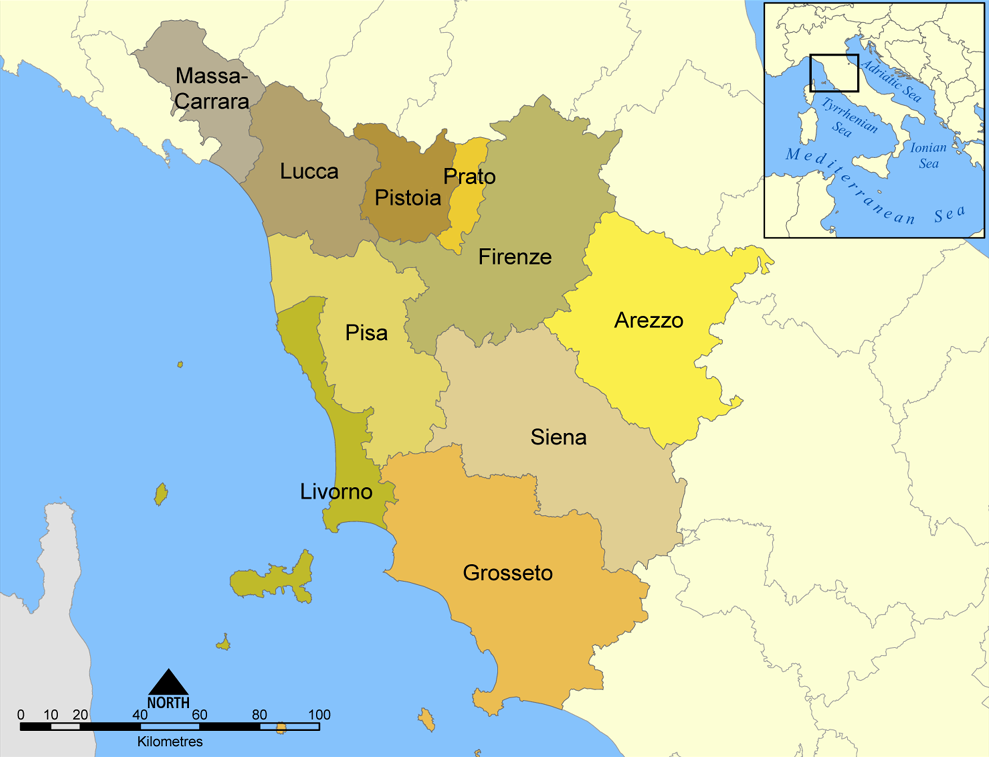
Barsaglina is most widely planted in the province of Massa and Carrara in northwest Tuscany.

In 2000, there were less than 30 hectares (74 acres) of Barsaglina planted in Italy, mostly in the province of Massa and Carrara in northwest Tuscany. Across the border in Liguria, some limited plantings of the grape are also found where it is known locally as Massaretta. The grape is currently permitted in several IGT wines, including the generic Toscana IGT and Val di Magra which runs through the province of Massa and Carrara. The grape is also permitted in the DOC wines of Colli di Luna in Tuscany.

== Styles ==
According to Master of Wine Jancis Robinson, Barsaglina tends to make deeply colored and tannic wines, due to the high anthocyanin and phenolic content of the grapes, with aromas of dark fruit and violets. In Tuscany, it is most often used as a blending component.

== Synonyms ==
Over the years, Barsaglina has been known under a variety of synonyms including: Barsullina, Bersaglina, Massareta (in Liguria) and Massaretta (in Liguria).
