= Parraleta =

Variety of grape

- Grape (Vitis)
- Color of berry skin: Red
- Species: Vitis vinifera
- Origin: Spain
- Notable regions: Somontano
- VIVC number: 8951

Parraleta is a red Spanish wine grape variety which might also be known under various other names, such as Tinta Caiada (Alentejo, Portugal) in several Mediterranean countries. Parraleta is chosen as a prime name as it (old synonym Parrel) was used in Somontano, region located in the north-east Spain, which is its likely place of origin. DNA profiles of Tinta Caiada (Alentejo, Portugal), and Carenisca (Sardinia, Italy), and Salceño Negro (Somontano, Spain) with that of Parraleta suggests that they are one and the same variety.

== History ==
The origin of Parraleta is uncertain, other than it seems to have appeared in Somontano. It was considered to be synonymous with Graciano, but this has been disapproved, although there is sufficient similarity to suggest a possible parental relationship. It has been also speculated that Parraleta is closely related to Vermentino Nero (Toscana, Liguria) however this has not yet been tested by DNA analysis. Although Parraleta is known as Carcajolo Nero on Corsica Island (France), it has been proved that it is not a color mutation of Bariadorgia, which is also called Carcajolo Blanc.

== Distribution and wines ==
Appears to be produced only in DO Somontano, where its importance has declined from 22% of the planted area in 1975 to only 0.2% in 2002. It is reported to produce wines with good colour, structure, acidity and fragrance.

== Vine and viticulture ==
Parraleta is a low yielding variety giving round mid-sized berries in small to medium and moderately compact bunches. It can be used to make varietal wine or blend most commonly with Moristel or Tempranillo. The wines usually have intense color, high phenol and acidity. The alcohol content is potentially higher however wines are often noted for aromatic flavors.

== Synonyms ==
Genetically verified synonyms: Carenisca (Sardinia), Monvedro (Bucelas, Portugal), Salceño Negro (Somontano), Tinta Caiada (Alentejo, Portugal).

Other known synonyms: Bonifaccencu or Bonifacienco (Sardinia, Italy), Bonvedro or Bomvedro (Bucelas in Portugal, Australia), Carcaghjolu Neru (Corsica), Carcajolo Nero or Carcajolo Noir (Corsica), Caricagiola (Gallura in Sardinia), Cua Tendra (Lérida, Spain), Espagnin Noir (France), False Carignan (Australia), Lambrusco de Alentejo (Portugal), or Monvedro do Algarve (Algarve, Portugal), Monvedro de Sines (Portugal), Olho Branco (Dão, Portugal), Parrel (Somontano, Spain), Pau Ferro (Algarve, Portugal), Perrel, Preto Foz (Dão, Portugal), Preto João Mendes (Portugal), Tinta Grossa (Alenquer, Portugal), Tinta Lameira (Douro), Tintorro (Alenquer, Portugal), Torres de Algarve (Portugal).

Varieties commonly mistaken for Parraleta: Graciano, Mazuelo, Monvedro (Dâo).
