= Montelopio =

- Frazione
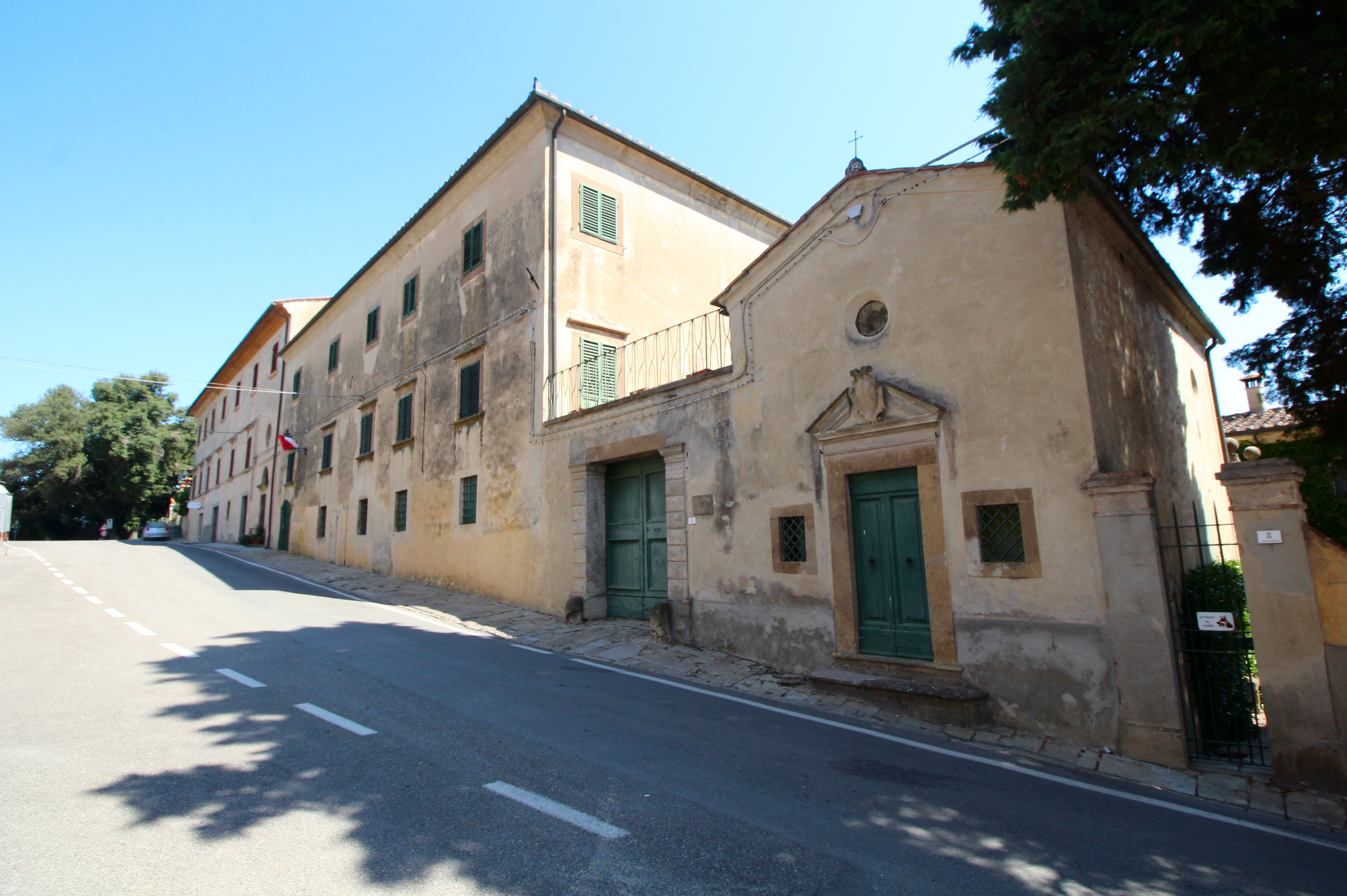

- Location of Montelopio in Italy
- Coordinates: 43°30′37″N 10°46′20″E
- Country: Italy
- Region: Tuscany
- Province: Pisa (PI)
- Comune: Peccioli
- Elevation: 181 m (594 ft)

Population (2001)
  - Total: 65
- Time zone: UTC+1 (CET)
  - Summer (DST): UTC+2 (CEST)
- Postal code: 56037
- Dialing code: (+39) 0587

Montelopio is a village in Tuscany, central Italy, that is administratively a frazione of the comune of Peccioli, province of Pisa. At the time of the 2001 census its population was 65.
