= Alcañón =

Variety of grape

- Grape (Vitis)
- Color of berry skin: Blanc
- Species: Vitis vinifera
- Also called: see list of synonyms
- Origin: Spain
- Notable regions: Somontano, Aragon

Alcañón is a rare white wine grape variety from Somontano Aragon, Spain. It was previously thought to be the same variety as Macabeo, but genetic analysis has shown that they are distinct varieties. It is an authorised variety in the Somontano DOP.

In 2016, a total of 27 hectares of vineyards were surveyed with a downward trend. However, it cannot be ruled out that some vineyards in the Somontano wine-growing region were mistakenly declared as Macabeo.

== Synonyms ==
Alcañón is also known under the synonyms Blanco Castellano and Bobal Blanca.
