= Bariadorgia =

Variety of grape

Bariadorgia (also known as Carcajolo blanc) is a white Italian/French wine grape variety that likely originated on the island of Sardinia but today is only found in limited planting on Corsica. Despite similarities in synonyms, Bariadorgia/Carcajolo blanc is not a color mutation of the red Spanish wine grape Parraleta which is also known as Carcajolo near on Sardinia.

== History and relationship to other grapes ==
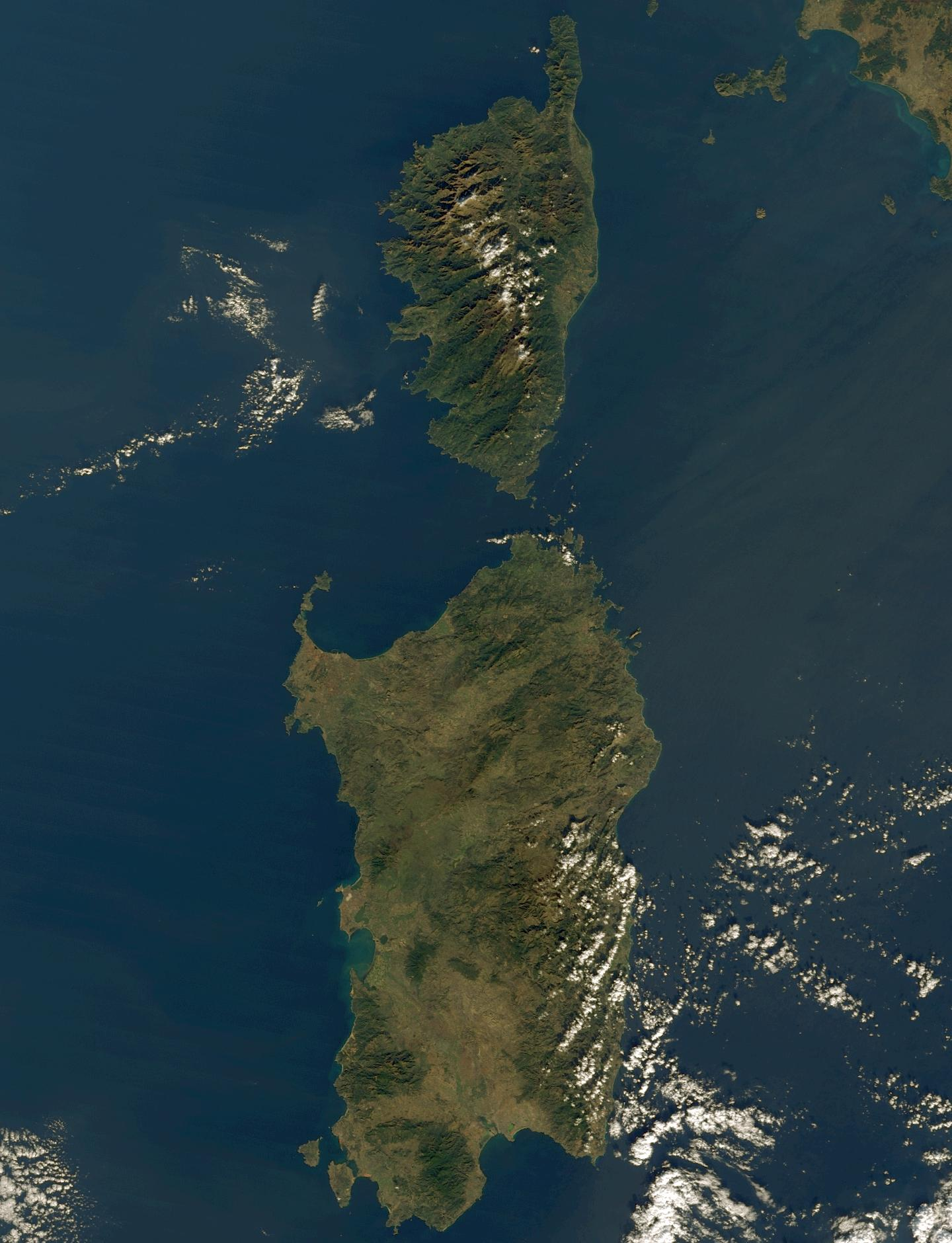
The islands of Sardinia (south) and Corsica where Bariadorgia is found.

While Bariadorgia was first mentioned in 1822 growing in the commune of Sartène on Corsica under the synonym Carcajola, ampelographers such as Gustave Foëx of the Viticultural College at the University of Montpellier and colleague of Pierre Viala have speculated since at least the early 20th century that grape was likely introduced from neighboring Sardinia. The commune of Alghero on the northwest coast of the island has been mentioned as the possible home of Bariadorgia.

While the origins of the name Bariadorgia is unclear, the synonym Carcajolo is believed to be derived from the Italian word caricagiola which means "heavily laden" and could be a reference to the large clusters that the Bariadorgia vine produce which can be heavy and weigh down the cane as the grapes near harvest.

In the early 21st century, DNA analysis showed that Bariadorgia was identical to plantings of Gregu bianco planted around the Campidano region of Sardinia. DNA profiling has further shown that the grape is not related to the Corsican grape Biancu Gentile nor is a color mutation of the Spanish wine grape Parraleta which is known as Carcajolo near on Sardinia.

== Viticulture ==
Bariadorgia is a mid-ripening grape variety that needs to be planted on sunny, well-situated sites in warm climate regions in order to achieve full physiological ripeness. The vine tends to produce big clusters of large size berries but usually has a relatively low sugar levels. Bariadorgia is highly sensitive to the viticultural hazards of botrytis bunch rot and powdery mildew.

== Wine regions ==
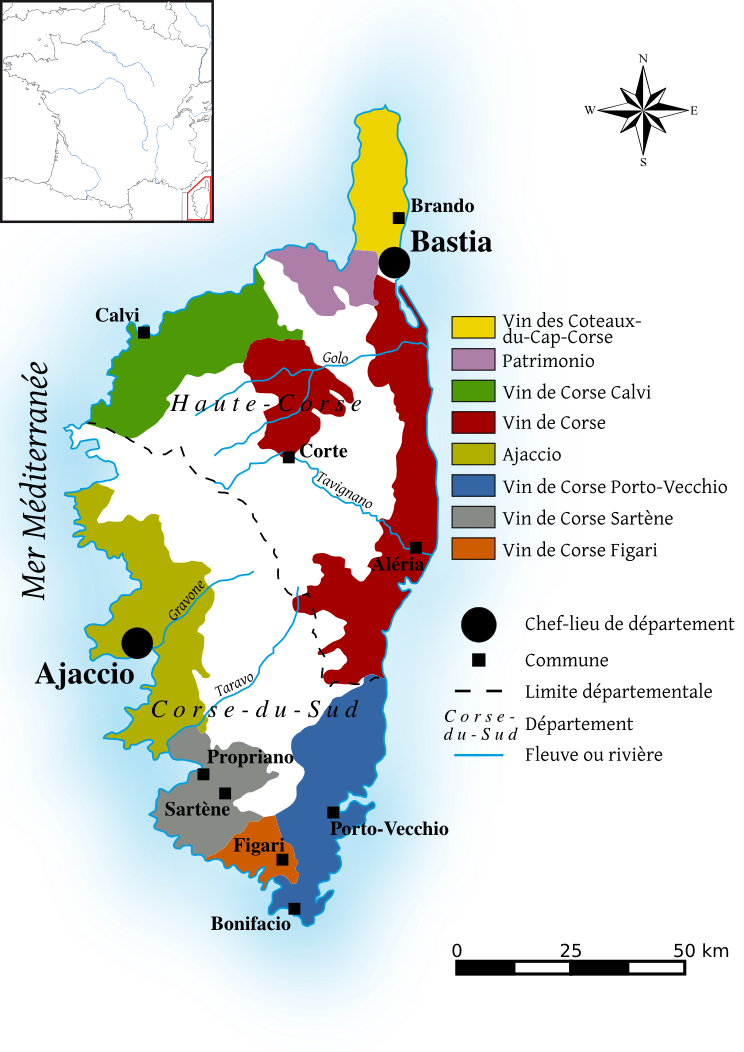
Bariadorgia/Carcajola blanc is found in only isolated plantings around the communes of Figari (orange) and Sartène (grey).

In its viticultural homeland of Sardinia, Bariadorgia is near extinct with only isolated plantings of Gregu bianco in the Campidano region only being recently identified in 2007 as being, in fact, Bariadorgia. Slightly more significant plantings, but still very isolated, of the grape are found on the neighboring French island of Corsica around the southern communes of Figari and Sartène. In French wine, Bariadorgia (known here as Carcajola blanc) is only authorized in a few wines in the Vin de Corse Appellation d'origine contrôlée (AOC) and the Vin de Pays de l'Île de Beauté. Still Corsican plantings of Carcajola blanc were so limited that the grape was not even included in the 2008 census of wine grape varieties conducted by the French authorities.

== Styles ==
According to Master of Wine Jancis Robinson, Bariadorgia tends to produce light to medium-bodied wines with moderate alcohol levels but noticeable acidity.

== Synonyms ==
Over the years, Bariadorgia has been known under a variety of synonyms including: Bariadorgia bianca, Barria Dorgia, Barriadorgia (in Sardinia), Barriadorza, Carcaghjolu biancu, Carcajola, Carcajolo bianco (in Sardinia), Carcajolo blanc (in Corsica), Cargajola blanc, Fragrante, Gregu bianco (in Sardinia), Variatoghja and Verzolina bianca.
