= Colli di Luni =

Italian controlled wine origin

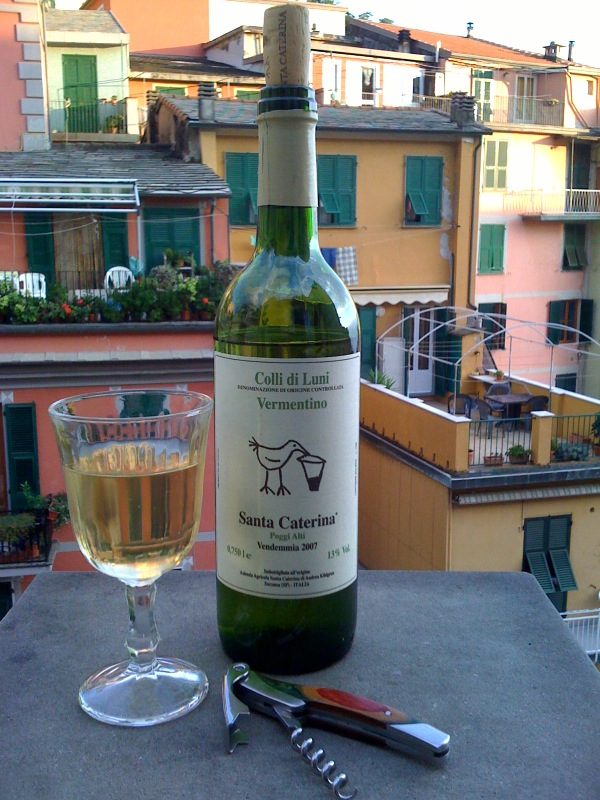
A varietal Vermentino produced in the Colli di Luni DOC.

Colli di Luni is an Italian Denominazione di origine controllata (DOC) located in both Liguria and Tuscany in northwest Italy. The DOC produces both reds and white wines made primarily from Sangiovese and Vermentino with a varietal Vermentino also being produced in the DOC.

Wine experts Joe Bastianich and David Lynch have described well made example of the reds of Colli di Luni as similar to "small scale Chiantis".

== DOC rules ==
Grapes destined for any DOC wine in Colli di Luni must harvested to a yield no greater than 12 tonnes/hectare. The red wines must contain between 60-70% Sangiovese with Pollera nera, Canaiolo and Ciliegiolo collectively making up 15-40% of the blend and other local red varieties, such as Barsaglina, Bracciola nera, Colombana nera and Vermentino nero permitted up to a maximum of 25% with the finished wine needing to attain a minimum alcohol level of at least 11.5%. A riserva bottling can also be produced with wines that attain at least 12.5% alcohol level and are aged a minimum of two years prior to release.

The white blends must contain at least 35% Vermentino and often contain much more along with 25-40% Trebbiano and no more than 30% of other local white grape varieties. The wines must attain a minimum alcohol level of at least 11%. A separate varietal Vermentino is also permitted to be produced provided that grape accounts for at least 90% of the wine.
