= Fabbrica, Peccioli =

Fabbrica
- Frazione
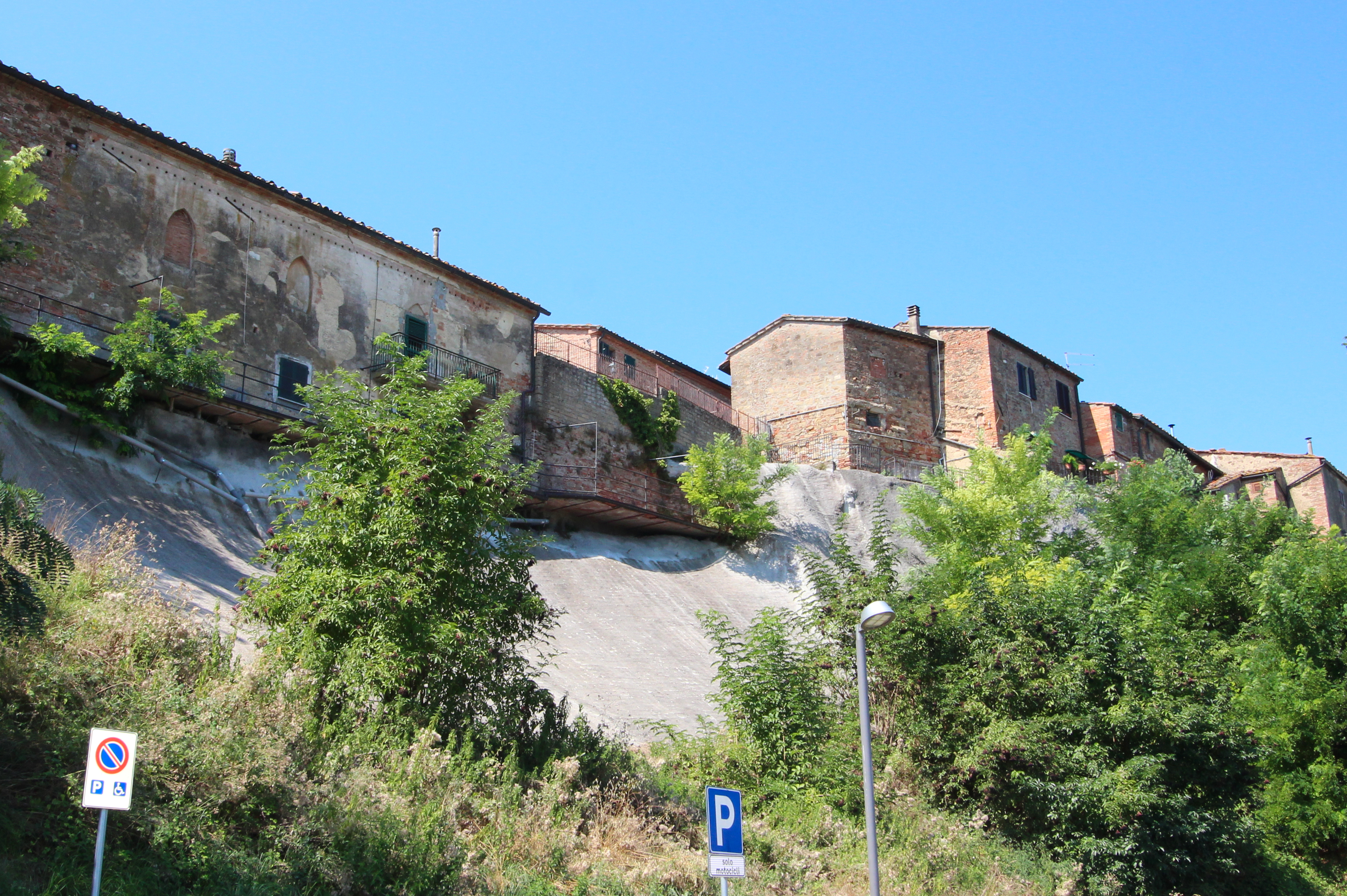

- Location of Fabbrica in Italy
- Coordinates: 43°30′30″N 10°45′30″E
- Country: Italy
- Region: Tuscany
- Province: Pisa (PI)
- Comune: Peccioli
- Elevation: 188 m (617 ft)

Population (2011)
  - Total: 735
- Time zone: UTC+1 (CET)
  - Summer (DST): UTC+2 (CEST)
- Postal code: 56037
- Dialing code: (+39) 0587

Fabbrica is a village in Tuscany, central Italy, administratively a frazione of the comune of Peccioli, province of Pisa. At the time of the 2001 census its population was 692.
