= Colombana nera =

Variety of grape

Colombana nera is a red Italian wine grape variety that is grown in Emilia-Romagna and Tuscany. Despite similarities in name, the grape did not get its name from nor is it grown in the San Colombano al Lambro region of Lombardy nor is it permitted in the Denominazione di origine controllata (DOC) wine of the same name. Rather, ampelographers believe that Colombana nera is named after the Abbey of San Colombano located in the commune of Bobbio in the Piacenza province of Emilia-Romagna where the grape has had a long history of cultivation.

== History ==
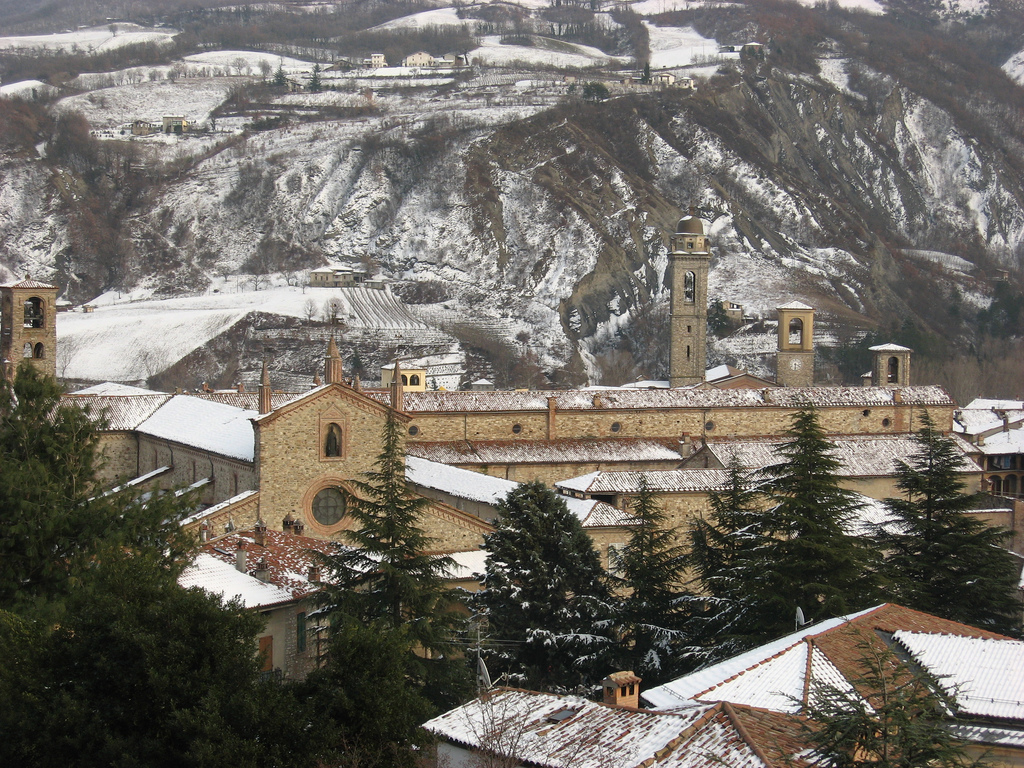
Ampelographers believe that Colombana near was named after the Abbey of San Colombano (pictured) in the commune of Bobbio in the Emilia-Romagna region where the grape has a long history of being cultivated.

Ampelographers believe that first mention of Colombana nera was likely in the posthumous work of the Italian viticulturist Giovan Vettorio Soderini that described a grape known as San Colombane growing in Tuscany and Emilia-Romagna in 1600. That early synonym and the grape's current name is believed to be taken from the Abbey of San Colombano in Bobbio where Colombana nera has a long history of being grown.

The exact origin of Colombana nera is unknown but DNA evidence showing a parent-offspring relationship between the grape and the old Tuscan wine grape Mammolo suggest that Tuscany may be the variety's homeland.

== Viticulture and relationship to other grapes ==
Colombana nera is a late ripening grape variety that can be very vigorous and high yielding if not kept in check by winter pruning and green harvesting.

In the early 20th century, DNA profiling found a link between Colombana nera and another Tuscan wine grape, Mammolo. The evidence suggest that Mammolo is one of the parent varieties of Colombana nera which would make the grape a sibling to Pollera nera, Caloria and Biancone di Portoferraio.

== Wine regions ==
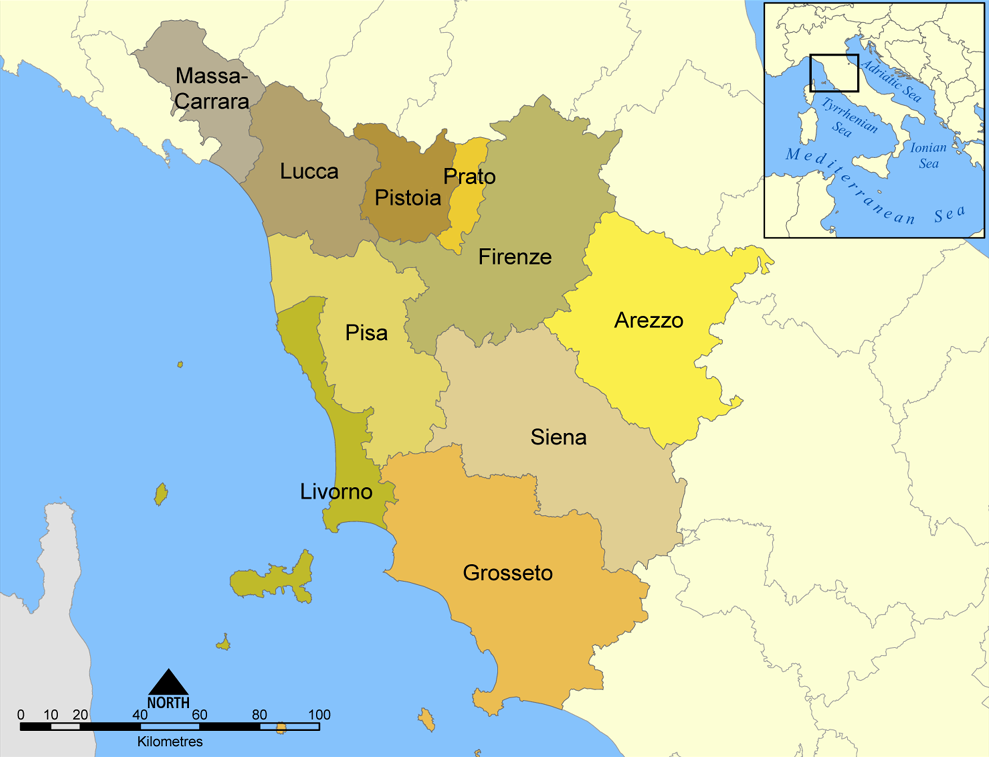
In Tuscany, Colombana nera is grown mostly in the northwestern provinces.

In 2000, there were 172 hectares (425 acres) of Colombana nera growing in Italy. In Emilia-Romagna it is found mostly in the province of Piacena while in Tuscany it can be found in the provinces of Livorno, Lucca, Massa-Carrara, Pisa and Pistoia. It is used primarily as a blending grape and is a permitted variety in the Colli di Luni DOC that includes both northern Tuscany and southeastern Liguria. Here the grape is permitted up to a maximum of 25% with other local red grape varieties such as Bracciola nera and Vermentino nero in the predominantly Sangiovese-based (60-70%) wine along with Pollera nera, Canaiolo and Ciliegiolo rounding out the blend.

Despite similarities in name, the Colombana nera is not grown in the San Colombano al Lambro DOC of Lombardy nor is it permitted in the DOC wine.

== Synonyms ==
Over the years, Colombana nera has been known under a variety of synonyms including: Basgana, Basgana nera, Basgano, Basgnano, Bazano, Bersegano, Besagana, Besegano, Besgano nero, Besgana, Besgano Di San Colombano, Besgano rosso, Bezgano nero, Colombana and Colombano rosso.
