= Biancone di Portoferraio =

Variety of grape

Biancone di Portoferraio is a white Italian wine grape variety that is grown almost exclusively on the island of Elba off the coast of Tuscany. Some ampelographers have speculated that the grape may have originated on the island of Corsica (France) where the grape shares a close genetic relationship with the Corsican wine grape Biancu Gentile (also known as just Biancone).

== History ==
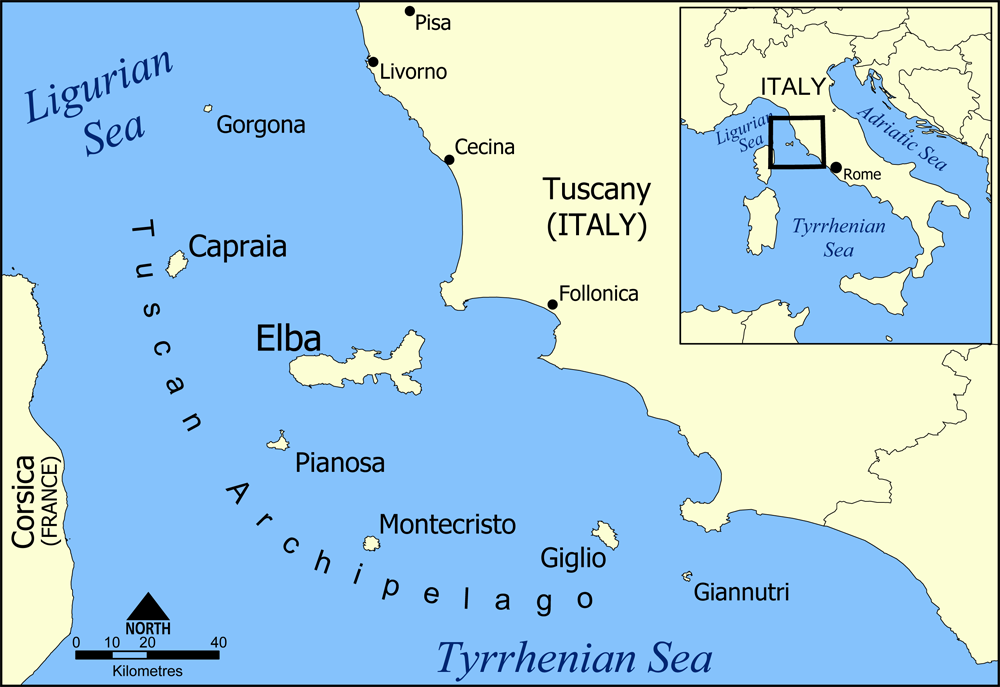
The island of Elba where Biancone di Portoferraio is grown is located between the French island of Corsica and Tuscany.

While Biancone di Portoferraio is today found almost exclusively on the Italian island of Elba, ampelographers suspect that the grape may have Corsican origins with DNA analysis in the early 21st century revealing that the grape has a potential parent-offspring relationship with the Corsican wine grape Biancu Gentile (Biancone). Further analysis revealed the red Tuscan wine grape Mammolo as another potential parent and listed the Italian grape varieties of Caloria, Colombana nera and Pollera nera as potential half-siblings.

== Viticulture and confusion with other grapes ==
Biancone di Portoferraio is a late ripening grape variety that is often one of the last grapes in Tuscany to be harvested during the growing season. Due to similarities in appearance and synonyms, the grape is often confused with the Corsican grape Biancu Gentile (which may be a parent variety) and the Ligurian wine grape Rollo.

== Wine regions ==
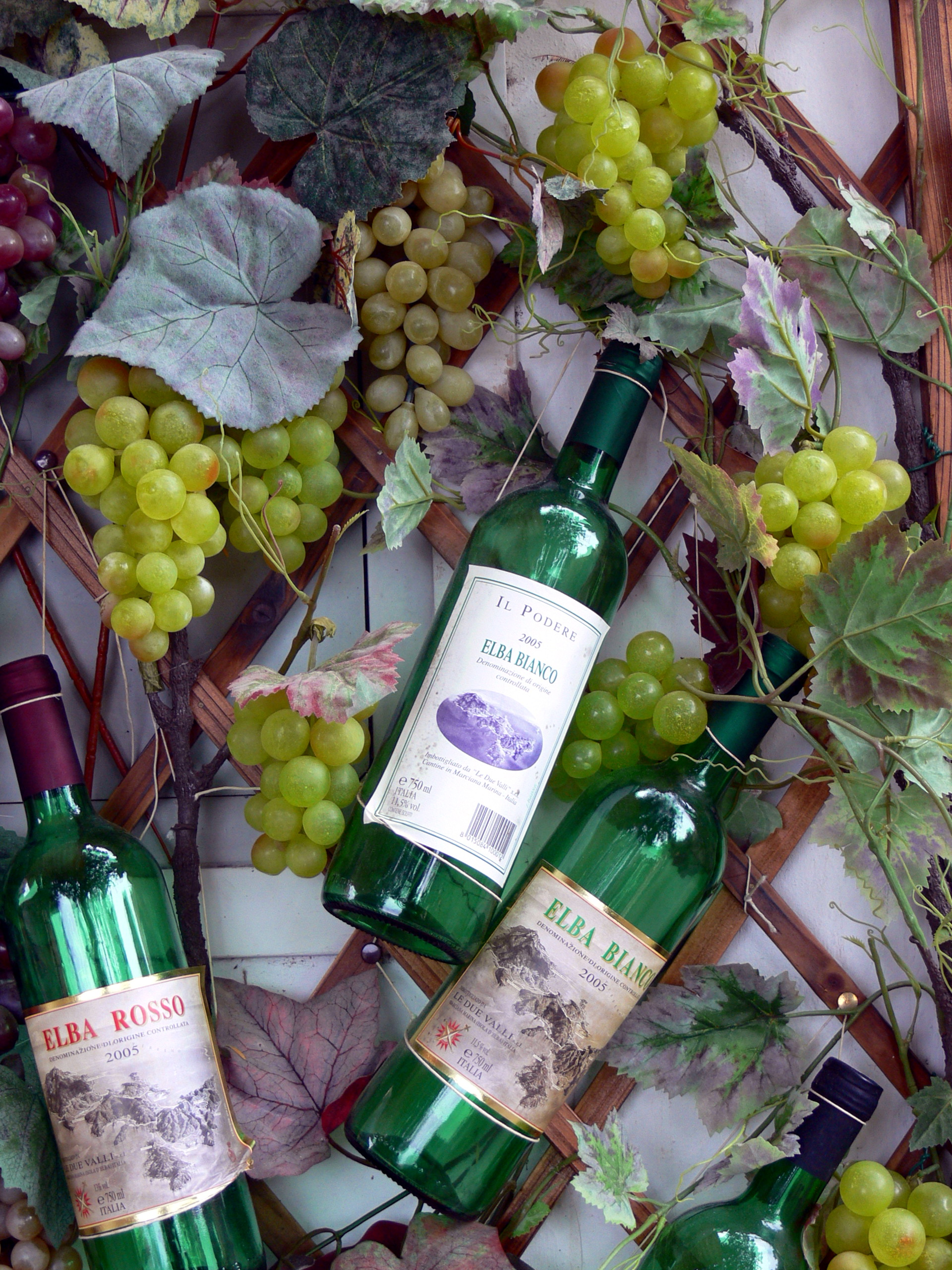
Biancone di Portoferaio is most often found in generic white table wines from Elba.

While some plantings of Biancone di Portoferraio may have previously existed on Corsica, where the grape was known as Biancone and Uva bianca, today the grape is found almost exclusively on the island of Elba located in the Tyrrhenian Sea between Corsica and the Tuscan coast.

== Styles ==
According to Master of Wine Jancis Robinson, Biancone di Portoferraio tends to produce simple, easy drinking wines that are usually just classified as "table wines".

== Synonyms ==
Over the years, Biancone di Portoferraio has been known under a variety of synonyms including: Biancona, Biancone (in Corsica), Biancone blanc, Corcesco, Folle Verte d'Oleron, Pagadebiti di Porto S. Stefano, Pagadebiti di Porto San Stefano and Uva bianca.
