= Cedri =

- Frazione
- Location of Cedri in Italy
- Coordinates: 43°30′31″N 10°49′3″E
- Country: Italy
- Region: Tuscany
- Province: Pisa (PI)
- Comune: Peccioli
- Elevation: 180 m (590 ft)

Population
  - Total: 35
- Time zone: UTC+1 (CET)
  - Summer (DST): UTC+2 (CEST)
- Postal code: 56037
- Dialing code: (+39) 0587

Cedri is a village in Tuscany, central Italy, administratively a frazione of the comune of Peccioli, province of Pisa. At the time of the 2006 parish census its population was 35.

Cedri is about 50 km from Pisa and 13 km from Peccioli.
