= Luigi Bellincioni =

Italian architect and engineer

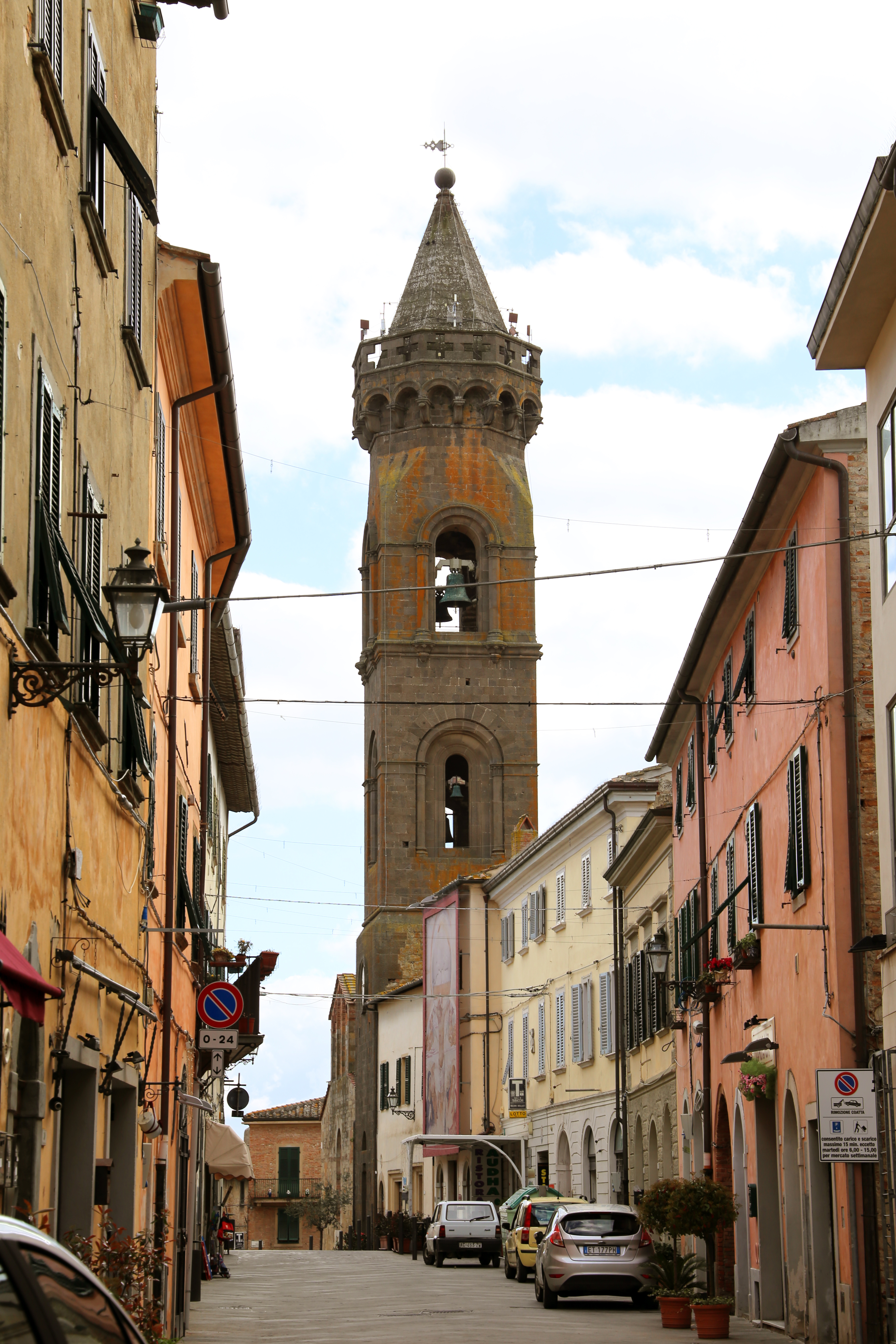
San Verano bell tower, Peccioli

Luigi Bellincioni (January 1, 1842 – March 24, 1929) was an Italian architect and engineer.

== Biography ==
He was born in Pontedera and died in Florence. He trained in Istituto Tecnico di Firenze, and apprenticed under the architect Giuseppe Michelacci, once Royal Inspector for Florence. Bellincioni served as assistant engineer for the Tuscan railroads. He also practiced with the architect Felice Francolini till 1866. he joined the city council of Pontedera, and Provincial Council of Pisa. On December 17, 1882, he became correspondent professor of the Royal Academy of Fine Arts in Florence. In 1888, he became resident professor. In 1885, he was knighted into the Order of the Crown of Italy. In 1888, he formed part of the Commission for the conservation of monuments and antiquities in the province of Pisa. Much of his work has been in Pontedera.

He helped rebuild the Hospital, Casa Fezzi, Casa Cerrai, and Casa Chirici-Catelani. In Vicopisano, he helped refurbish the Villa Fehr-Schmole; in San Ruffino, the Villa Norci; the Church Pievania in Forcoli; the enlargement and redecoration of the Theater of Pontedera. He also helped build the Stabilimento industriale Ricci, Casa Balbiani in Pontedera; Villa Ciardi in Solajella; the Cemetery of Ponsacco; the Tombs and the Cemetery of Campiglia Marittima; the Cemetery and the Convent of Franciscans in Capannoli in the province of Pisa; the bell-tower of Marti, and the Stabilimento Industriale Bellincioni in Pontedera. Among his other works:

- Monumental Cemetery of Riparbella, (1894)
- Church of the Misericordia in Pontedera, (1883–1892)
- Palazzo Morini in Pontedera, (1880–1885)
- Palazzo Naldini in Pontedera, (1880)
- Palazzo Bruschi in Pontedera
- Palazzo Bellincioni in Pontedera, (1886)
- Palazzo Pitschen in Pontedera, (1883)
- Palazzo Ciompi in Pontedera, (1872)
- Palazzo Paoletti Zeppini in Pontedera, (1868–1870)
- Belltower of the parochial church of Sant’Andrea in Soiana, (1886–1897)
- Belltower of the church of San Pietro in Santo Pietro Belvedere (Capannoli)
- Belltower of the church of San Verano in Peccioli
- Belltower of the parochial church of San Giovanni in Pomarance, (1898)
- Belltower of the parochial church of Pieve di Santa Maria Novella (Marti)
