= Sant'Andrea a Montecchio =

- Frazione
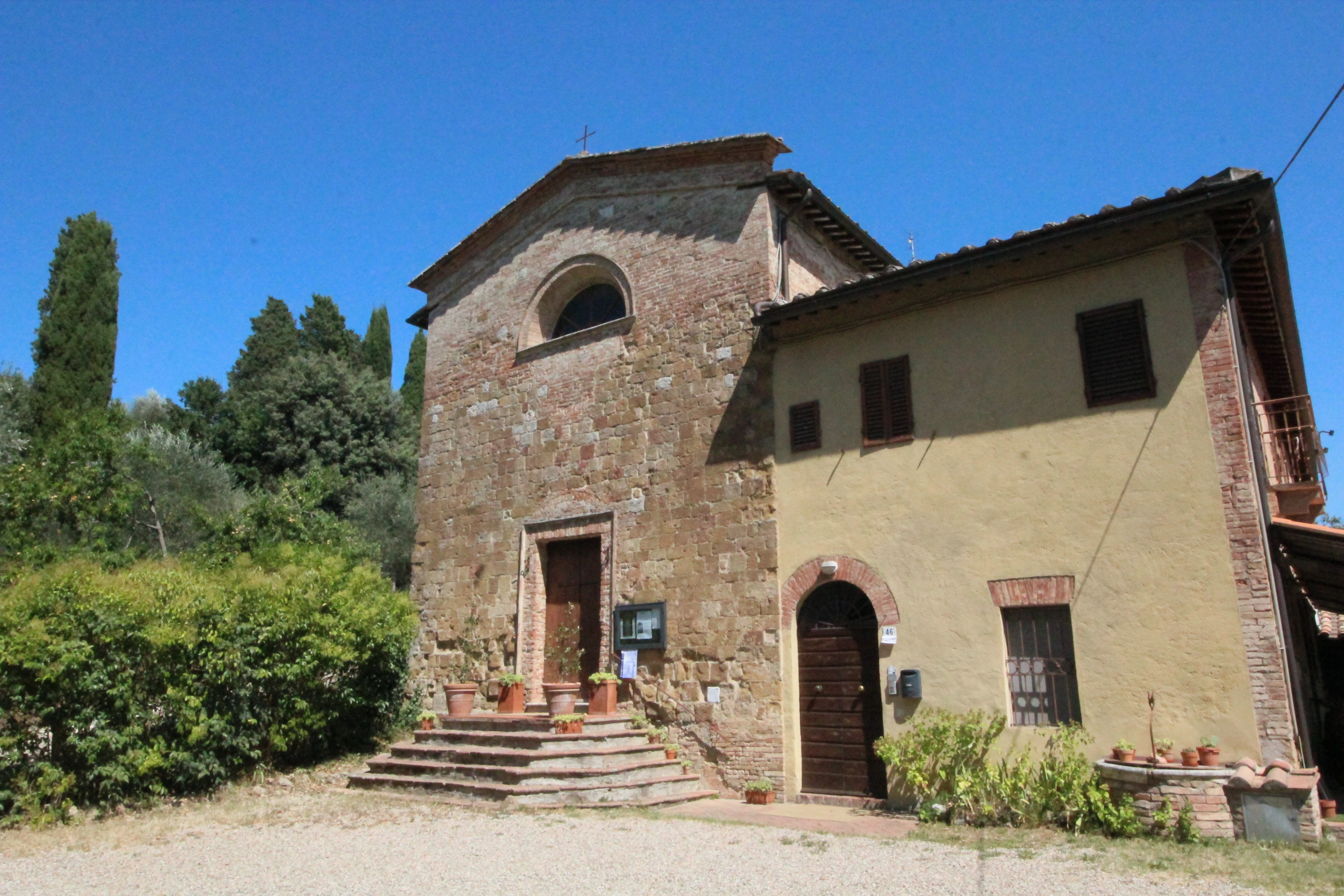
- The church of Sant'Andrea in Sant'Andrea a Montecchio

- Location of Sant'Andrea a Montecchio in Italy
- Coordinates: 43°16′56″N 11°18′15″E
- Country: Italy
- Region: Tuscany
- Province: Siena (SI)
- Comune: Siena
- Elevation: 273 m (896 ft)

Population (2011)
  - Total: 791
- Time zone: UTC+1 (CET)
  - Summer (DST): UTC+2 (CEST)

Sant'Andrea a Montecchio is a village in Tuscany, central Italy, in the comune of Siena, province of Siena. At the time of the 2001 census its population was 726.

Sant'Andrea a Montecchio is about 7 km from Siena.
