= Montecchio, Peccioli =

Montecchio
- Frazione
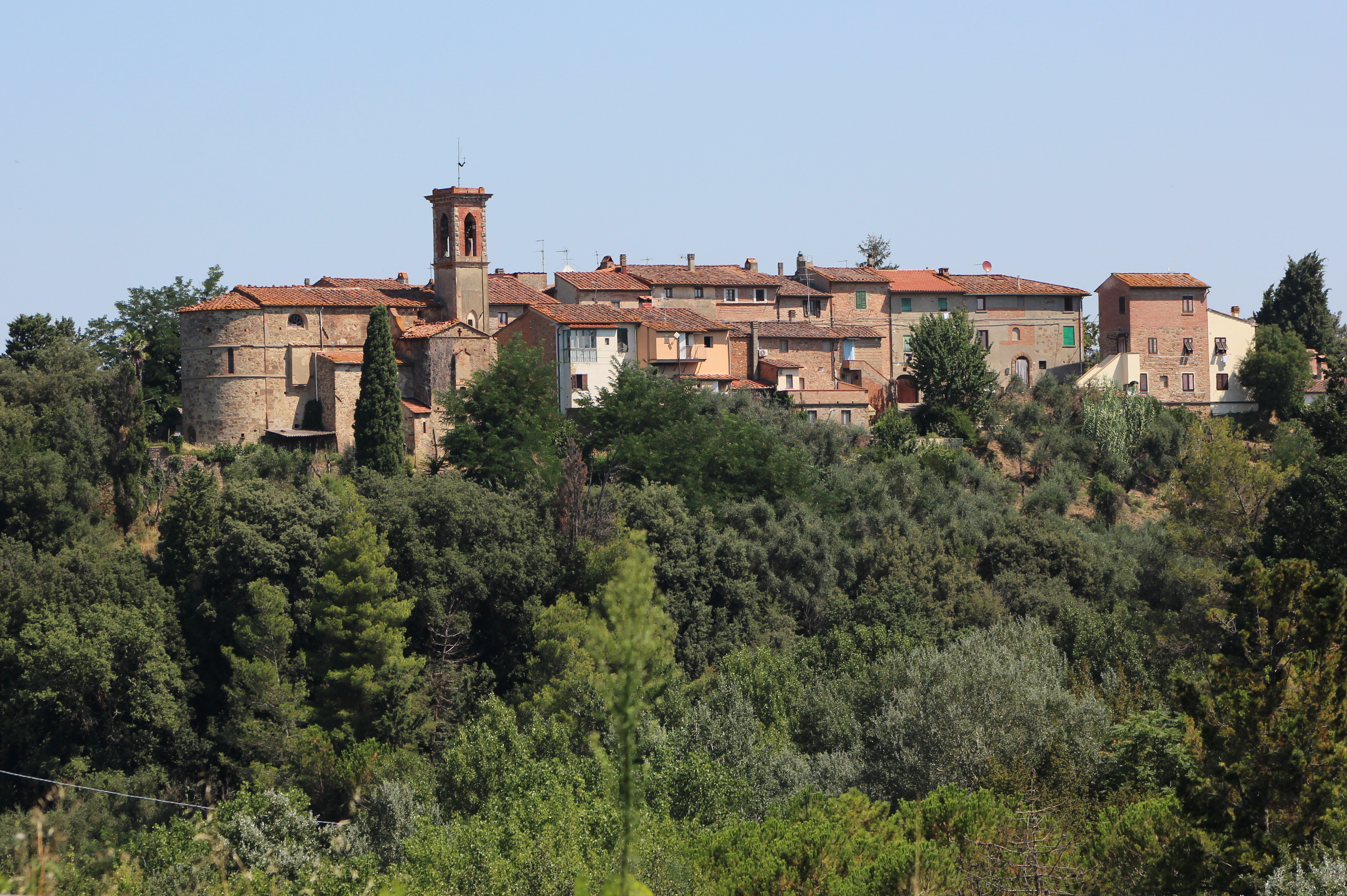

- Location of Montecchio in Italy
- Coordinates: 43°31′33″N 10°44′28″E
- Country: Italy
- Region: Tuscany
- Province: Pisa (PI)
- Comune: Peccioli
- Elevation: 204 m (669 ft)

Population (2011)
  - Total: 195
- Demonym: Montecchiesi
- Time zone: UTC+1 (CET)
  - Summer (DST): UTC+2 (CEST)
- Postal code: 56037
- Dialing code: (+39) 0587

Montecchio is a village in Tuscany, central Italy, administratively a frazione of the comune of Peccioli, province of Pisa. At the time of the 2001 census its population was 158.
