= Vermentino nero =

Variety of grape

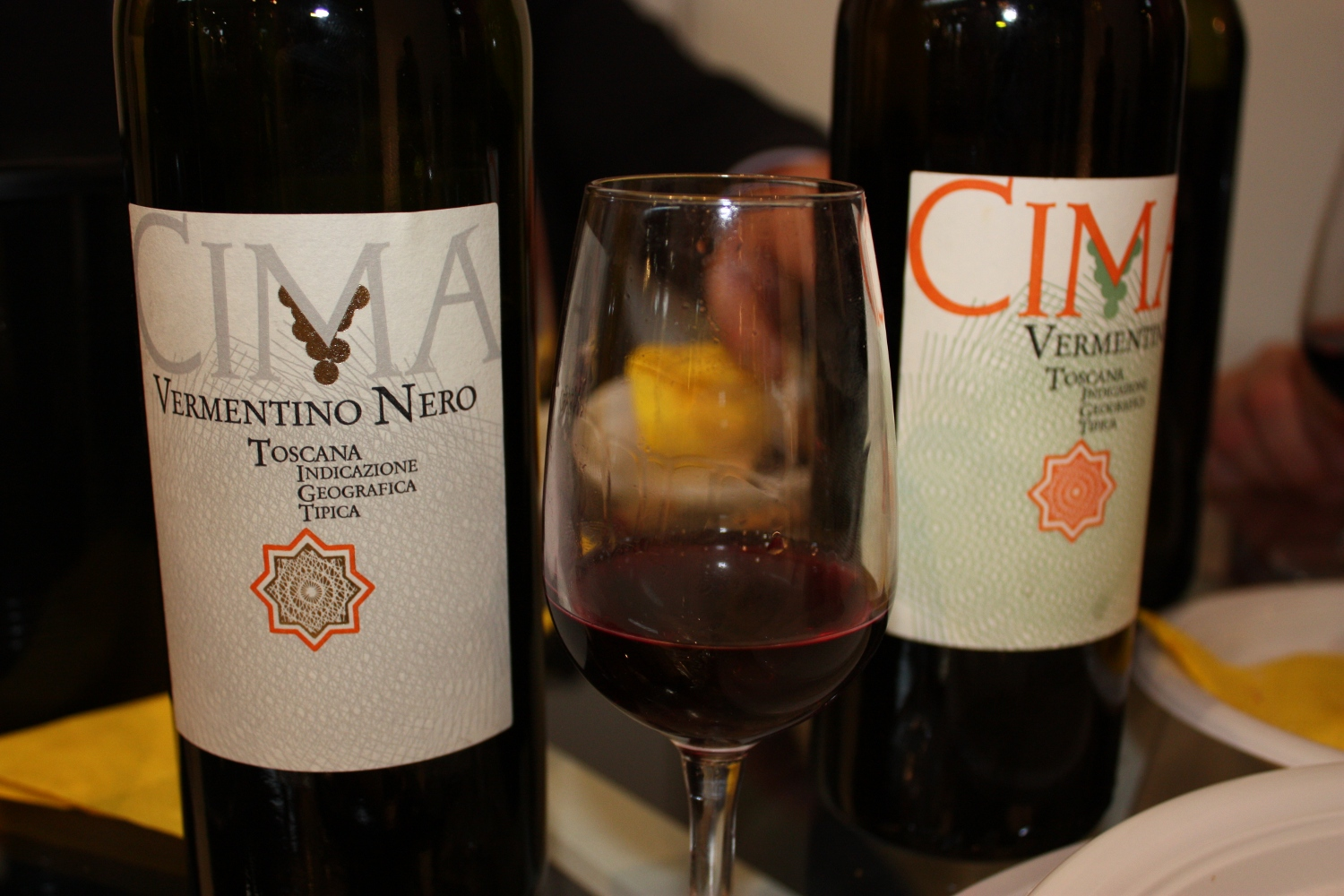
A Tuscan IGT wine made from Vermentino nero.

Vermentino nero is a red Italian wine grape variety that is predominantly grown in province of Massa-Carrara in Tuscany. After World War II, the vine was almost lost to extinction until Podere Scurtarola, a producer from Massa, began replanting old vineyards with the grape. By 2000, there were 199 hectares (492 acres) of Vermentino nero growing in Italy with the grape authorized for production in the Denominazione di origine controllata (DOC) wines of Candia dei Colli Apuani and Colline Lucchesi.

The grape was long believed to a dark-berried color mutation of Vermentino though some ampelographers believe that the grape may have Spanish origins and be related to Monastrell or the Aragonese grape Parraleta used in the wines of Somontano. As of 2012, DNA profiling on the grape variety has not been able to confirm or deny either theory.

== History ==
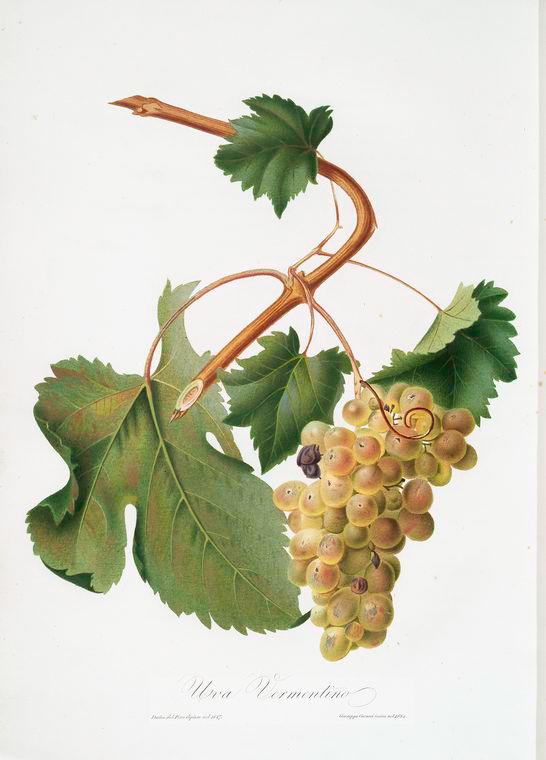
It is not yet known if Vermentino nero is a dark-berried color mutation of Vermentino (pictured).

The exact origins of Vermentino nero is not yet known. There are some ampelographers who believe that the grape is a color mutation of the widely planted white Vermentino grape (known as Pigato in neighboring Liguria and Favorita in Piedmont) and maybe native to the Massa-Carrara region in Tuscany. Other ampelographers believe that the grape may have Spanish origins and could be a relative of Monastrell and Parraleta. So far DNA analysis has not been able to produce evidence to support or cast doubt on either theory.

Like many Italian varieties, plantings of Vermentino nero sharply declined during the early 20th century as the conflicts of the era took its toll on viticulture throughout the country. By the end of World War II, Vermentino nero was on the verge of extinction until a Massa wine producer, Podere Scurtarola, began cultivating old vineyards with the variety (much the same way that the estate helped revive Barsaglina). Historically a blending variety, Scurtarola released the first varietal Vermentino nero in 1989.

== Viticulture ==
Vermentino nero is a mid to late ripening grape variety. The vine is very susceptible to the viticultural hazards of botrytis bunch rot and powdery mildew.

== Wine regions ==
Most plantings of Vermentino nero are found in the northwestern Tuscan provinces of Massa-Carrara and Lucca.

In 2000, there were 199 ha (492 acres) of Vermentino nero planted in Italy, nearly all of it in the provinces of Massa-Carrara and Lucca in Tuscany. The grape is an authorized variety in the DOC wines of Candia dei Colli Apuani in Massa-Carrara, Colline Lucchesi in Lucca and Colli di Luni in Liguria.

== Styles ==
According to Master of Wine Jancis Robinson, Vermentino nero tends to produce full bodied wines with dark fruit aromas and spicy notes.

== Synonyms ==
The only synonym recognized by the Vitis International Variety Catalogue (VIVC) for Vermentino nero is Vermentina nera.
