= Libbiano, Peccioli =

Libbiano
- Frazione
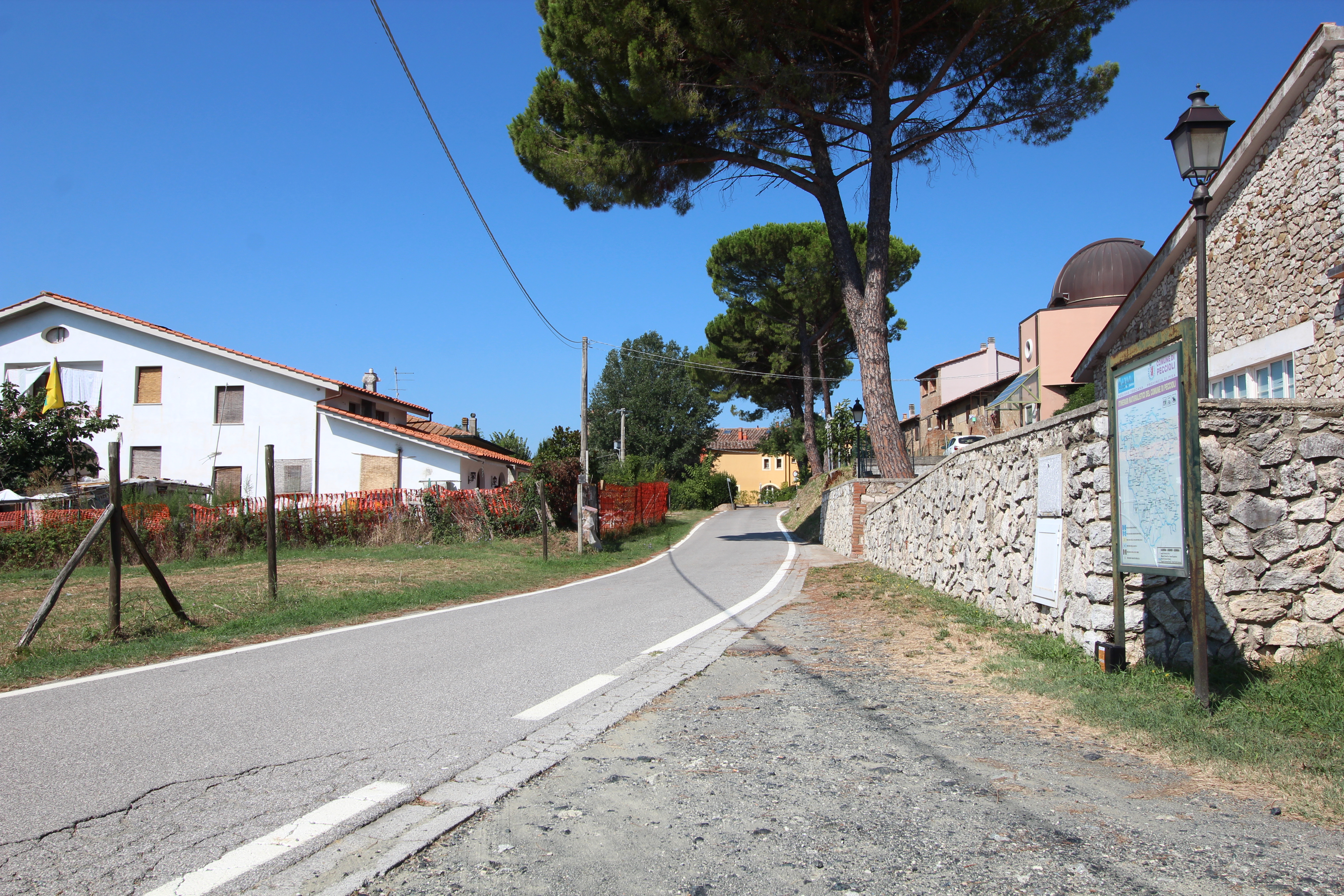

- Location of Libbiano in Italy
- Coordinates: 43°33′19″N 10°46′40″E
- Country: Italy
- Region: Tuscany
- Province: Pisa (PI)
- Comune: Peccioli
- Elevation: 191 m (627 ft)

Population (2001)
  - Total: 23
- Time zone: UTC+1 (CET)
  - Summer (DST): UTC+2 (CEST)
- Postal code: 56037
- Dialing code: (+39) 0587

Libbiano is a village in Tuscany, central Italy, administratively a frazione of the comune of Peccioli, province of Pisa. At the time of the 2001 census its population was 23.

Libbiano is about 45 km from Pisa and 7 km from Peccioli.
