= Besgano bianco =

Variety of grape

Besgano bianco is a white Italian wine grape variety that was historically used in the production of the dessert wine Vin Santo, blended with Malvasia Bianca Lunga and Verdea, but today is rarely planted and is more often used for table grape production than winemaking. The grape is also known as Colombana bianca but it is not a color mutation of the Tuscan and Emilia-Romagna wine grape Colombana nera.

== History ==
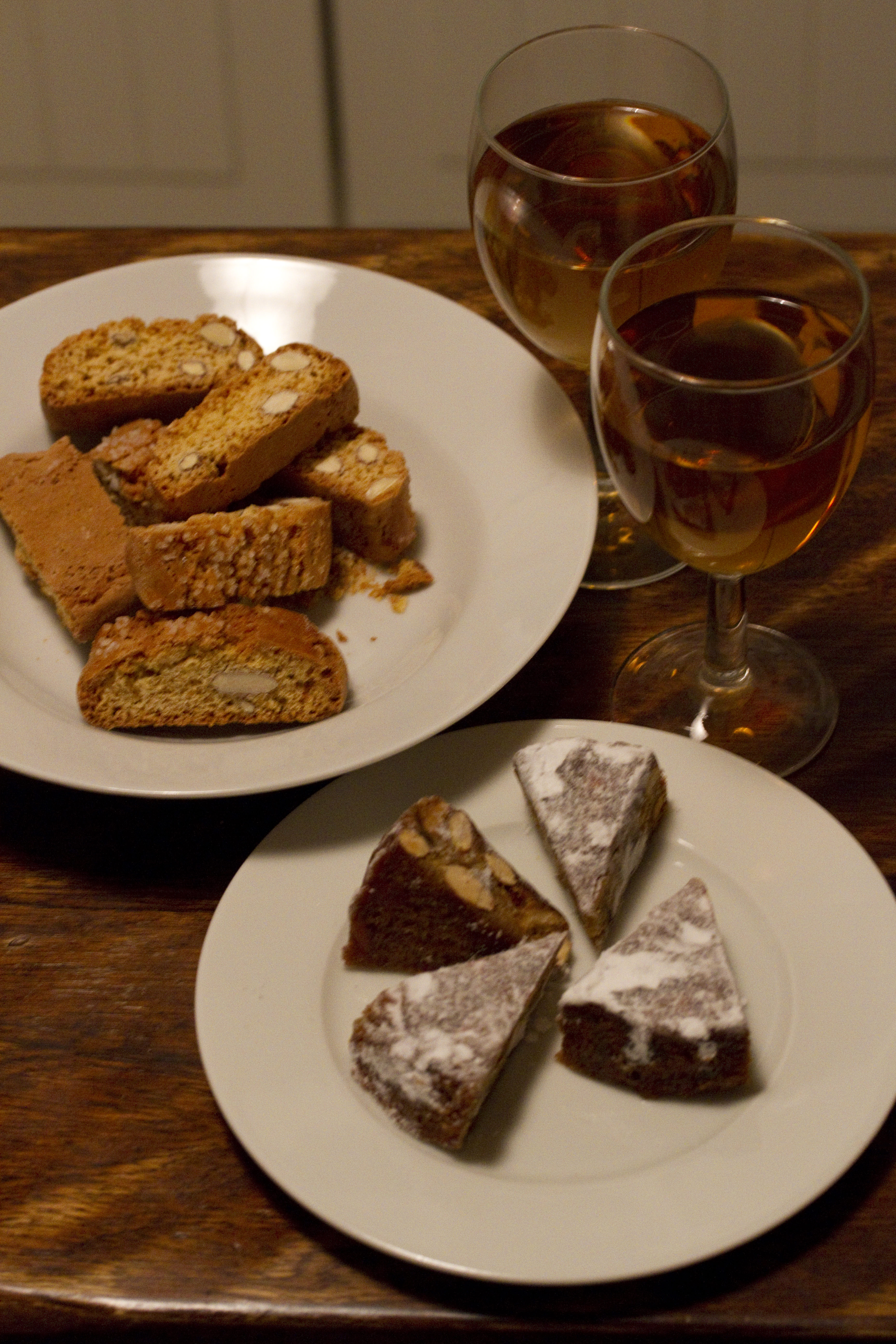
Besgano bianco was historically used as a blending grape in the production of Vin Santo.

Ampelographers believe that Besgano bianco is native to north central Italy thought the exact place of origin is not yet known. The two areas listed as the most plausible locations, based on historic associations with the grape, is the commune of Voghera in the province of Pavia in Lombardy and the commune of Bobbio in the province of Piacenza in Emilia-Romagna where the Abbey of San Colombano is located after which the grape's synonym Colombana bianca is derived.

Besgano bianco was historically used in the production of the straw wine Vin Santo, particularly in Liguria and Emilia-Romagna, where it was blended with Malvasia Bianca Lunga and Verdea. However, since World War II plantings of the grape have sharply declined and by 2000 it was not even listed in the official Italian census of wine grape varieties.

== Wine regions ==
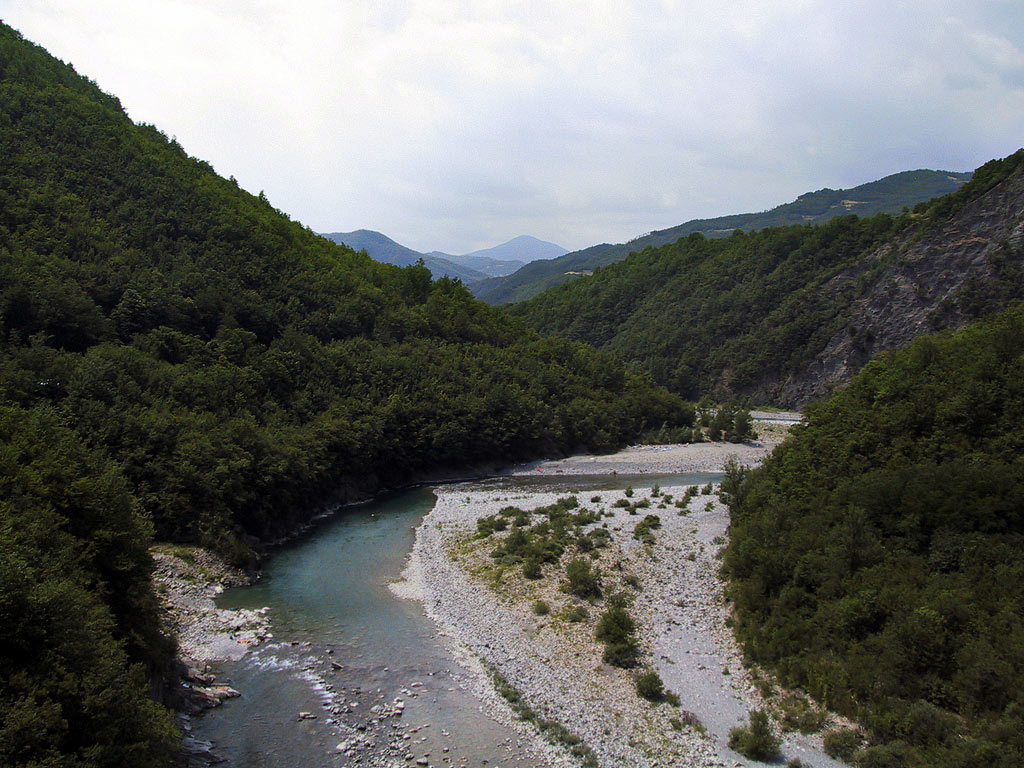
The Trebbia river near Bobbio in Emilia-Romagna.

While today Besgano bianco is not widely planted, the grape has historically been associated with the provinces of Genoa and Piacenza and the valleys of the Trebbia and Nure rivers which flow through Liguria, Emilia-Romagna and Lombardy.

== Synonyms ==
Over the years, Besgano bianco has been known under a variety of synonyms including: Besgano bianca, Besgano, Bianco di Bobbio, Colombana bianca, Gragnolato blanco, Grangnolo bianco, Grignola, Grignolato bianco, Grignolino bianco, Grignolo, Grignolo bianco, Grignolo Bianco di San Colombano, San Colombano Piccolo and Uva di Milano.
