= Somontano =

Coordinates: 42°2′10″N 0°7′35″E

Somontano DOP
- Wine region
- Somontano DOP in the province of Huesca in the region of Aragon
- Official name: D.O.P Somontano
- Type: Denominación de Origen Protegida (DOP)
- Year established: 1984
- Country: Spain
- No. of vineyards: 3,931 hectares (9,714 acres)
- No. of wineries: 31
- Wine produced: 184,449 hectolitres
- Comments: Data for 2016 / 2017

The 4 DOP wine regions in the region of Aragon, (Spain)

Somontano is a Spanish Denominación de Origen Protegida (DOP) for wines, created in 1984, and located in the county of the same name, in the province of Huesca, Aragon, Spain. It borders the regions of Sobrarbe and Ribagorza in the north, Hoya de Huesca in the west, the Monegros in the south, and La Litera in the east. Wine production is centred on the town of Barbastro. The name Somontano derives from Latin roots meaning “beneath the mountain”. The area spreads out from the foothills of the Pyrenees down to the Ebro valley. The DOP includes 43 municipalities, most of them in the Somontano area, and a few bordering on Ribagorza and the Monegros. There are over 4000 hectares of vines and about 500 individual grape-growers.

== Geography ==
The DOP has three different sub-zones: the Mountains, the Somontano foothills proper, and the Plains. The Alcanadre river divides the Somontano area in two: Somontano de Huesca in the West and Somontano de Barbastro in the East. The vines here enjoy a dark sandy-clay soil, particularly high in lime content and rich in alluvial matter. The soil is not especially fertile, but has good drainage, which facilitates the deep penetration of roots so they can absorb more moisture and nutrients. The region's climate is continental, with the Pyrenees mountains buffering exposure to the cold northern winds. Nonetheless, winter freezes are common, as are extremely high temperatures in the summer. Daily temperatures also fluctuate significantly between day and night. Average rainfall is 500 mm.

== History ==
Grapes have been grown in the Somontano region since antiquity, at least since the 2nd century BC, their cultivation being influenced by the settlement of the Romans, as they introduced more advanced techniques. In the Middle Ages, the area covered by vineyards expanded to cover the whole province, with wine production prospering under the oversight of local monasteries. More recently, the phylloxera plague which struck France in the 19th century, resulted in exports and increased sales of Somontano wine from the region.

== Tourism ==
The Ruta del Vino (Wine Route) of Somontano is one of the 13 official wine routes recognised by ACEVIN and the Spanish government, and its aim is to promote wine-related tourism to the region. As a non-profit organisation it offers promotional support to tourism establishments and wineries and offers unbiased information to visitors and tourists.

In addition to wine, other attractions in Somontano include:

The Sierra de Guara National Park - famous for the sport of canyoning
The medieval village of Alquézar
The River Vero Cultural Park - home to a collection of over 60 cave paintings, jointly declared as a World Heritage Site by UNESCO
The Torreciudad Shrine - halfway point between Lourdes and the Basilica of Our Lady of the Pillar of Zaragoza on the Marian Route
The city of Barbastro

Around half of the 31 wineries in Somontano welcome visitors and most can offer guided tours in Spanish, English and French. A visit includes a tour of the installations with explanations, followed by a wine tasting.

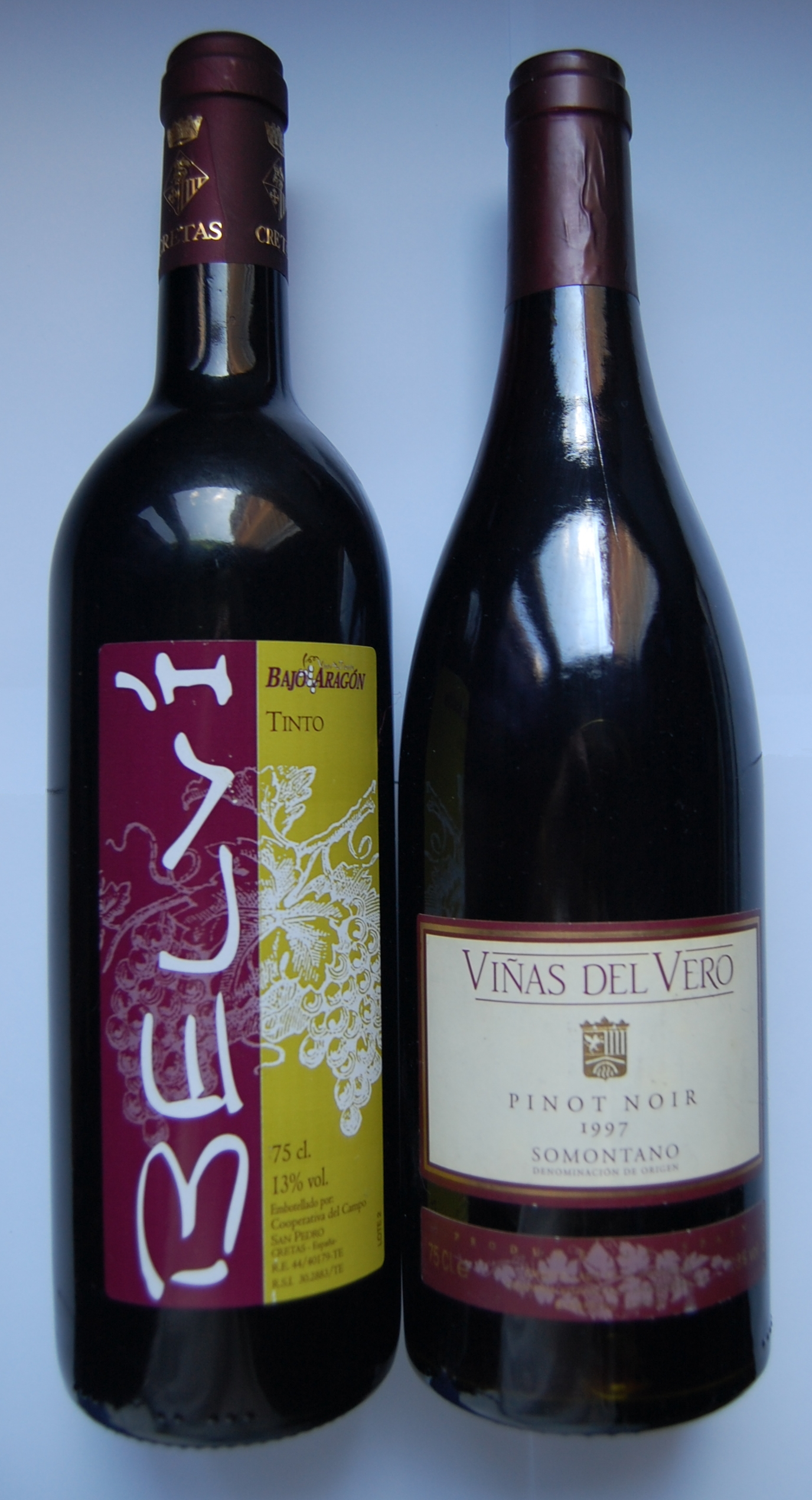
Bottles of wine from Somontano DO

== Authorised Grape Varieties ==
The authorised grape varieties are:

- Red: Cabernet Sauvignon, Garnacha Tinta, Merlot, Moristel, Parraleta, Pinot Noir, Syrah, and Tempranillo
- White: Alcañón, Chardonnay, Garnacha Blanc, Gewürztraminer, Macabeo, Riesling, and Sauvignon Blanc
