= Peccioli =

- Comune
- Comune di Peccioli
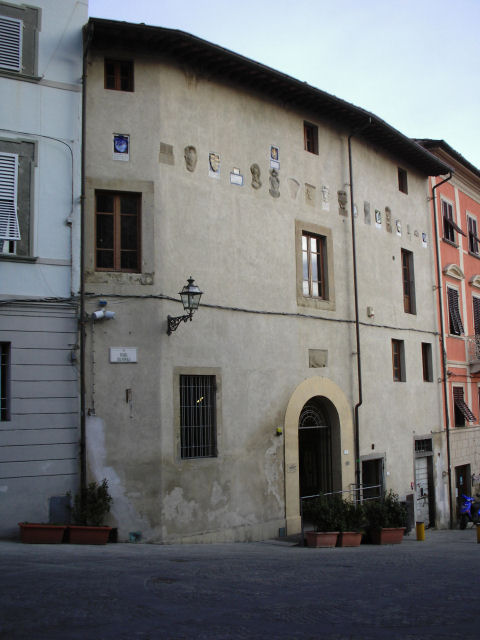
- Palazzo Pretorio.

- Coat of arms

- Location within Italy Location within Tuscany
- Coordinates: 43°33′N 10°43′E
- Country: Italy
- Region: Tuscany
- Province: Pisa (PI)
- Frazioni: Cedri, Fabbrica, Ghizzano, Legoli, Libbiano, Montecchio, Montelopio

Government
  - Mayor: Renzo Macelloni (Peccioli Futura)

Area
  - Total: 92.6 km^{2} (35.8 sq mi)
- Elevation: 144 m (472 ft)

Population (2014)
  - Total: 4,893
  - Density: 52.8/km^{2} (137/sq mi)
- Time zone: UTC+1 (CET)
  - Summer (DST): UTC+2 (CEST)
- Postal code: 56037
- Dialing code: 0587
- Website: Official website

Peccioli (Italian pronunciation: [ˈpɛttʃoli]) is a comune (municipality) in the Province of Pisa in the Italian region Tuscany, located about 50 kilometres (31 miles) southwest of Florence and about 30 km (19 miles) southeast of Pisa.

== Main sights ==
- Pieve di San Verano, most likely built between the end of the 11th and the beginning of the 12th century. It has a façade with five blind arcades and Lombard bands. The belltower, from 1885, inglobates remains of the medieval structure. The interior has a nave and two aisles: it houses canvasses from Jacopo Vignali, an 18th-century crucifix, a Madonna with Child and Saints by Neri di Bicci (1484) and two paintings from the 13th century Pisan school.
- Chapel of Santa Caterina, including a late 15th-century tabernacle frescoed by Benozzo Gozzoli when he had moved in the area to escape plague.
