= Pollera nera =

Variety of grape

- Grape (Vitis)
- Color of berry skin: Noir
- Species: Vitis vinifera
- Also called: See list of synonyms
- Origin: Italy
- VIVC number: 9585

Pollera nera is a red Italian wine grape variety that is grown primarily in the Liguria wine region and northwest Tuscany. Ampelographers believe that the vine has a very long winemaking history but it is rarely seen today. It is believed to have been descended from the Chianti wine grape Mammolo and the Corsican wine grape Sciacarello which would make it a half-sibling of Colombana nera.

== DOC wines ==
Pollera nera is a permitted variety in the Denominazione di origine controllata (DOC) wines of Colli di Luni that spans across the border between Liguria and Tuscany. Here the red wines are primarily Sangiovese (60-70%) with Pollera nera, Canaiolo and Ciliegiolo collectively making up 15-40% of the blend and other local red varieties permitted up to a maximum of 25%. Grapes destined for the DOC wine must harvested to a yield no greater than 12 tonnes/hectare with the finished wine needing to attain a minimum alcohol level of at least 11.5%. A riserva bottling can also be produced with wines that attain at least 12.5% alcohol level and are aged a minimum of two years prior to release.

== Synonyms ==
Over the years Pollera nera has been known under a variety of synonyms including Corlaga, Corlage, Palera, Polera, Pollara nera and Pollora Nera.
