= Giovan Vettorio Soderini =

Italian agronomist

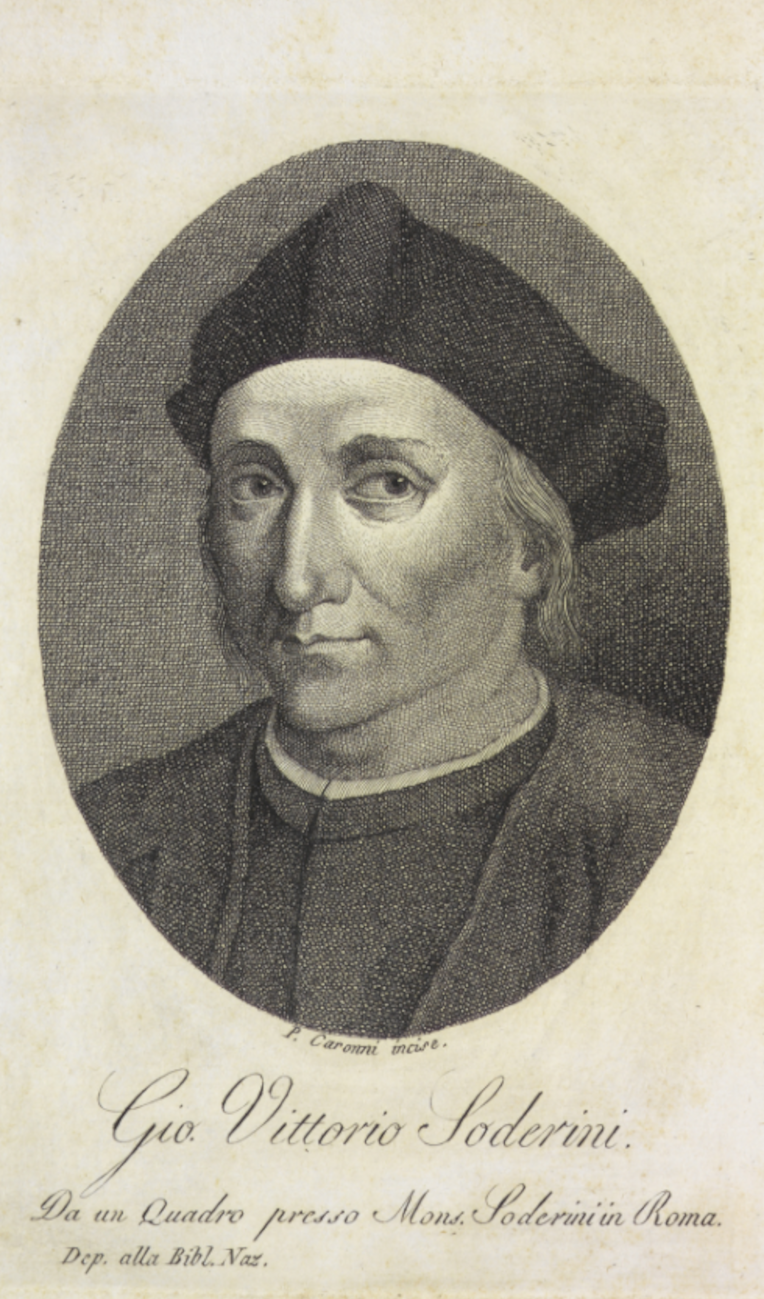
Portrait of Giovanni Vittorio Soderini Copperplate engraving by Paolo Caronni

Giovan Vettorio Soderini (6 March 1526 in Florence – 3 March 1596 in Volterra) was an Italian agronomist.

== Biography ==
Soderini studied philosophy and law at the University of Bologna. On his return to Tuscany, he spoke openly against the Medici, and even participated in a conspiracy whose aim was to take power from them. Condemned by the Council of Florence to lose his head on the scaffold, he owed his salvation to the generosity of Ferdinando I de' Medici, Grand Duke of Tuscany, who banished him for life in Cedri near Volterra, after which Soderini devoted himself to the study of agriculture. Giovanni belonged to the same family as Piero Soderini who had been exiled by the Medici.

== Treaty on the cultivation of the vineyard ==
His Trattato della coltivazione delle viti, e del frutto che se ne puo cavare (Treatise on the Cultivation of the Vineyard, and the Fruit That Can Be Obtained) (Florence, Filippo Giunti, 1600), which the academicians of the Accademia della Crusca have put in the Test di conoscenza della lingua italiana (Test of knowledge of the Italian language), contains several precepts of viticulture and oenology. Soderini gives a major role to astrology, recommending to bring in the harvest when the moon is in a certain sign and in decline, for "if one collects then less wine, at least one is sure of its quality and its conservation". The book is dedicated by the editor Giunti to Florentine poet Luigi Alamanni. It appeared for the first time with another treatise on the same subject by Bernardo Davanzati, and the Apology of the Melon (Popone) by Lionardo Giachini. Soderini's book was reprinted separately by Domenico Maria Manni in 1734, with some biographical information.

In 1590, Soderini, under the alias Ciriegiulo, published the first documented mention of the Sangiovese ("blood of Jove") grape, calling it "Sangiogheto", noting that in Tuscany the grape makes very good wine, but if the winemaker is not careful, it risks turning into vinegar.

== Other works ==
- Breve descrizione delie pompa funerale fatua neir esequie del gran ducq Francesco Medici, ibid., 1587
- Trattato d1 agricoltura, ibid., 1811
- Delia coltura degli orti e giardini, ibid, 1814
- Trattato degli alberi, ibid., 1817.

The last three treatises have been extracted from the unpublished manuscripts preserved in the Magliabechiana Library in four volumes. For further information see the manual of Manni, and Poggiali: Serie de testi di lingua, t. 1, p. 366, and t. 2, p. 72.

- "Giovan Vettorio Soderini," in Louis Gabriel Michaud, Ancient and Modern Universal Biography: Alphabetically by history of public and private life of men with the collaboration of more than 300 French and foreign scholars and litterateurs, 2nd edition, 1843–1865
