= Swedish wine =

Wine making in Sweden

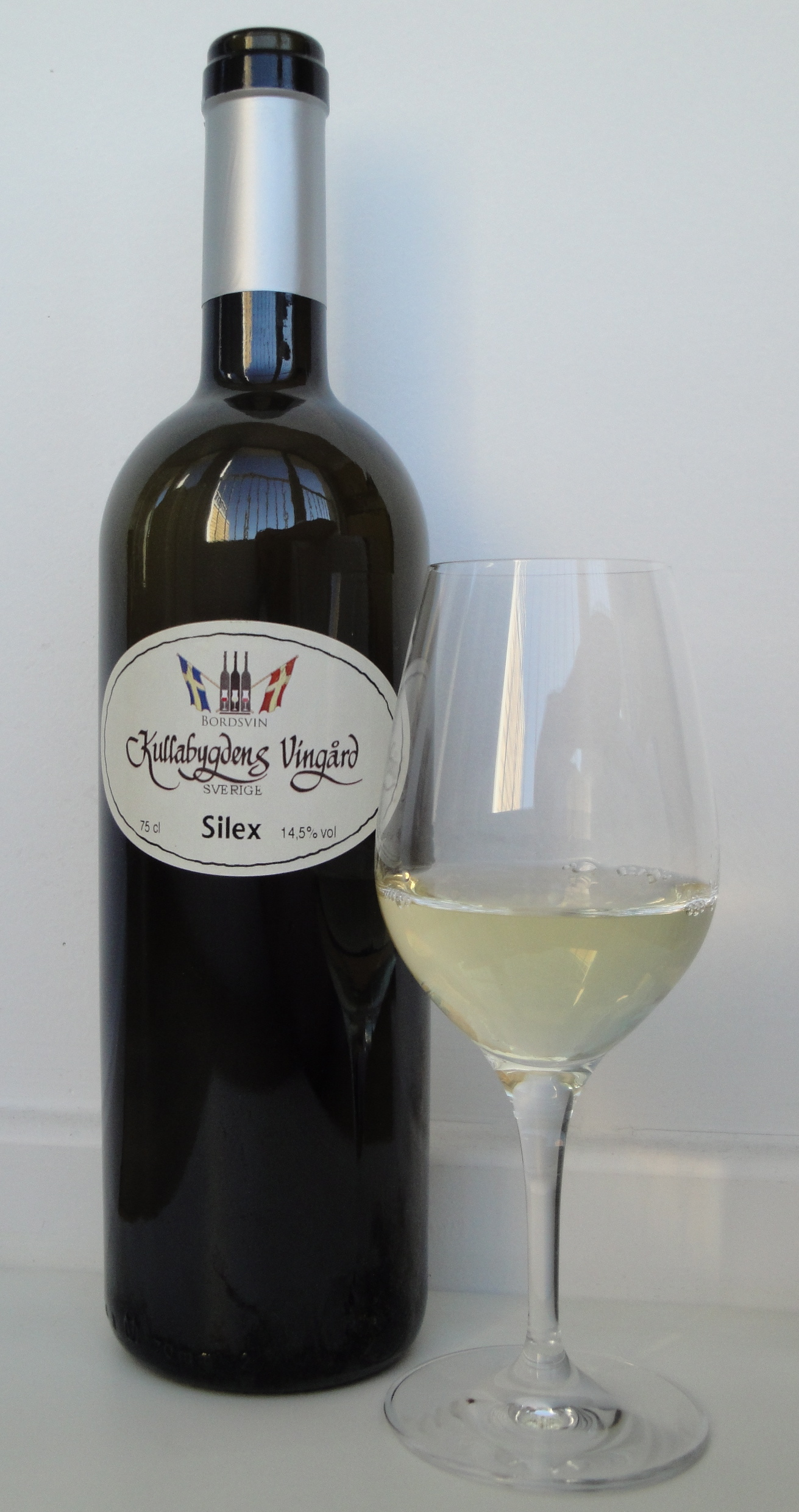
A Swedish wine from Scania, produced from Solaris grapes grown on flint soil.

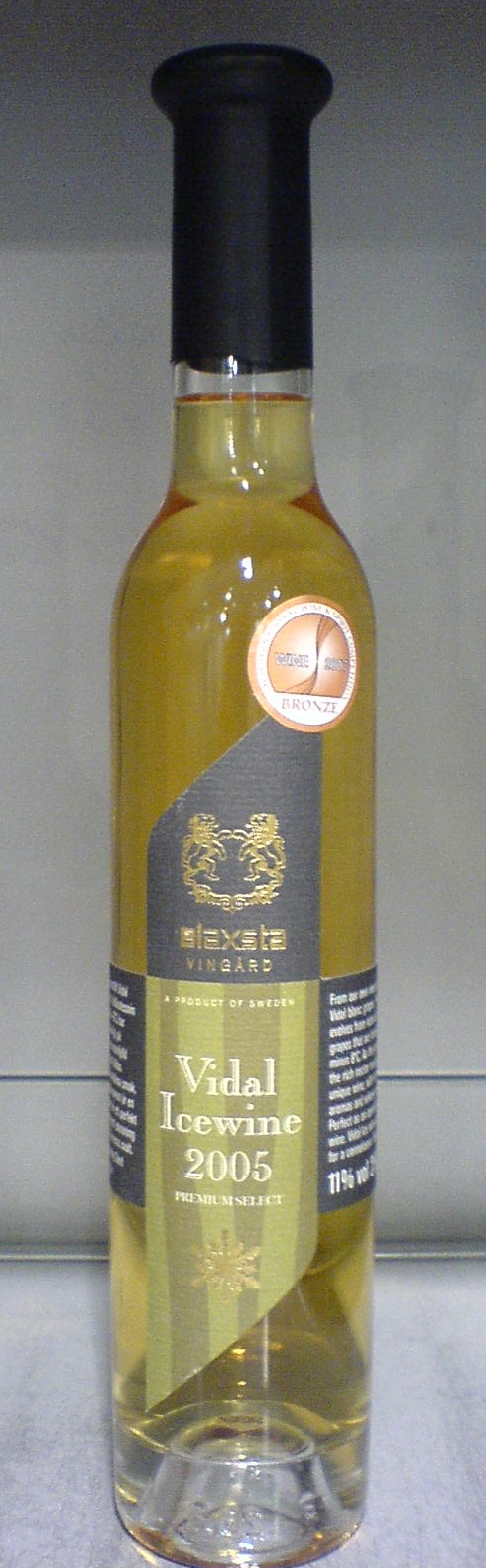
A Swedish Vidal ice wine.

Swedish wine, in terms of wine produced commercially from grapes grown in Sweden, is a very marginal but growing industry which saw its first beginnings in the late 1990s.

In less strict usage, the term "Swedish wine" has also been applied to fruit wine from Sweden, which has a very long tradition, and wine produced in Sweden from imported grape juice, which goes back longer than actual viticulture in Sweden.

== History ==
Sweden is well north of the area where the European vine, Vitis vinifera, occurs naturally, and there is no historic tradition of wine production from grapes in the country. Some sources claim that some monastic vineyards were established when the Roman Catholic church established monasteries in Sweden in medieval times, when Sweden's climate was milder, but traces of this supposed viticulture are much less evident than the corresponding activities in England, for example.

Small-scale growing of grapes in Swedish orangeries and other greenhouses has occurred for a long time, but the purpose of such plantations was to provide table grapes as fruit or for decoration or exhibition purposes, and not to provide grapes for wine production.

Towards the end of the 20th century, commercial viticulture slowly crept northwards, into areas beyond the well-established wine regions, as evidenced by Canadian wine, English wine and Danish wine. This trend was partially made possible by the use of new hybrid grape varieties, partially by new viticultural techniques, and partially by climate change.

The idea of commercial freeland viticulture in Sweden appeared in the 1990s. Some pioneers, especially in Skåne (Scania), took their inspiration from nearby Denmark, where viticulture started earlier than in Sweden, while others took their inspiration from experiences in other winemaking countries.

Perhaps surprisingly, the first two wineries of some size were not established in the far south of Sweden, but in Södermanland County close to Flen (in an area where orchards were common), and on the island of Gotland, which has the largest number of sunshine hours in Sweden. Later expansions have mostly been in Scania.

There are also small-scale viticulturalists who grow their grapes in greenhouses rather than in the open.

Small quantities of a few commercial Swedish wines were sold by Systembolaget from the early 2000s.

== Modern industry ==
Only a handful of Swedish producers can be considered to be commercial operations, rather than hobby wine makers. In 2006, the Swedish Board of Agriculture counted four Swedish companies that commercialized wine produced from their own vineyards. The total production was 5,617 litres (1,236 imperial gallons; 1,484 US gallons), of which 3,632 litres (799 imperial gallons; 959 US gallons) were red and 1,985 litres (437 imperial gallons; 524 US gallons) white, and this amount was produced from around 10 hectares (25 acres) of vineyards.

The Association of Swedish winegrowers estimates 30-40 vinegrowing establishments in Scania, but this number includes hobby growers with a fraction of a hectare of vineyards.

== Regulations ==
As a member of the European Union, wine production in Sweden has to abide by the European Union wine regulations. However, as the total commercial vineyard area in Sweden stayed below 100 hectares (250 acres), Sweden did not have to apply for planting rights. Since this part of the regulations was abolished in 2015, Sweden was never affected by them.

So far, Sweden has only enacted a minimum of national laws and regulations related to viticulture, which include a list of allowed grape varieties. However, there are no protected designations of origin for Swedish wine, which means that Swedish producers are restricted to marketing table wines, and can not market quality wines. This means several restrictions on labeling practices. For example, the vintage year may not be mentioned on the label.

=== Grape varieties ===
The following grape varieties are authorized for commercial wine production in Sweden:

==== White grapes ====
- Bacchus
- Bianca
- Chardonnay
- Kerner
- Madeleine Angevine 7672
- Malingre Précoce
- Merzling
- Müller-Thurgau
- Orion
- Ortega
- Phoenix
- Reichensteiner
- Riesling
- Sauvignon blanc
- Seyval blanc
- Siegerrebe
- Solaris
- Vidal blanc
- Zalas Perle

==== Red grapes ====
- Acolon
- Cabernet Dorsa
- Cabernet Franc
- Frühburgunder
- Garanoir
- Léon Millot
- Merlot
- Pinot noir
- Regent
- Rondo

== See also ==
- Winemaking
- Agriculture in Sweden
