= Danish wine =

Wine making in Denmark

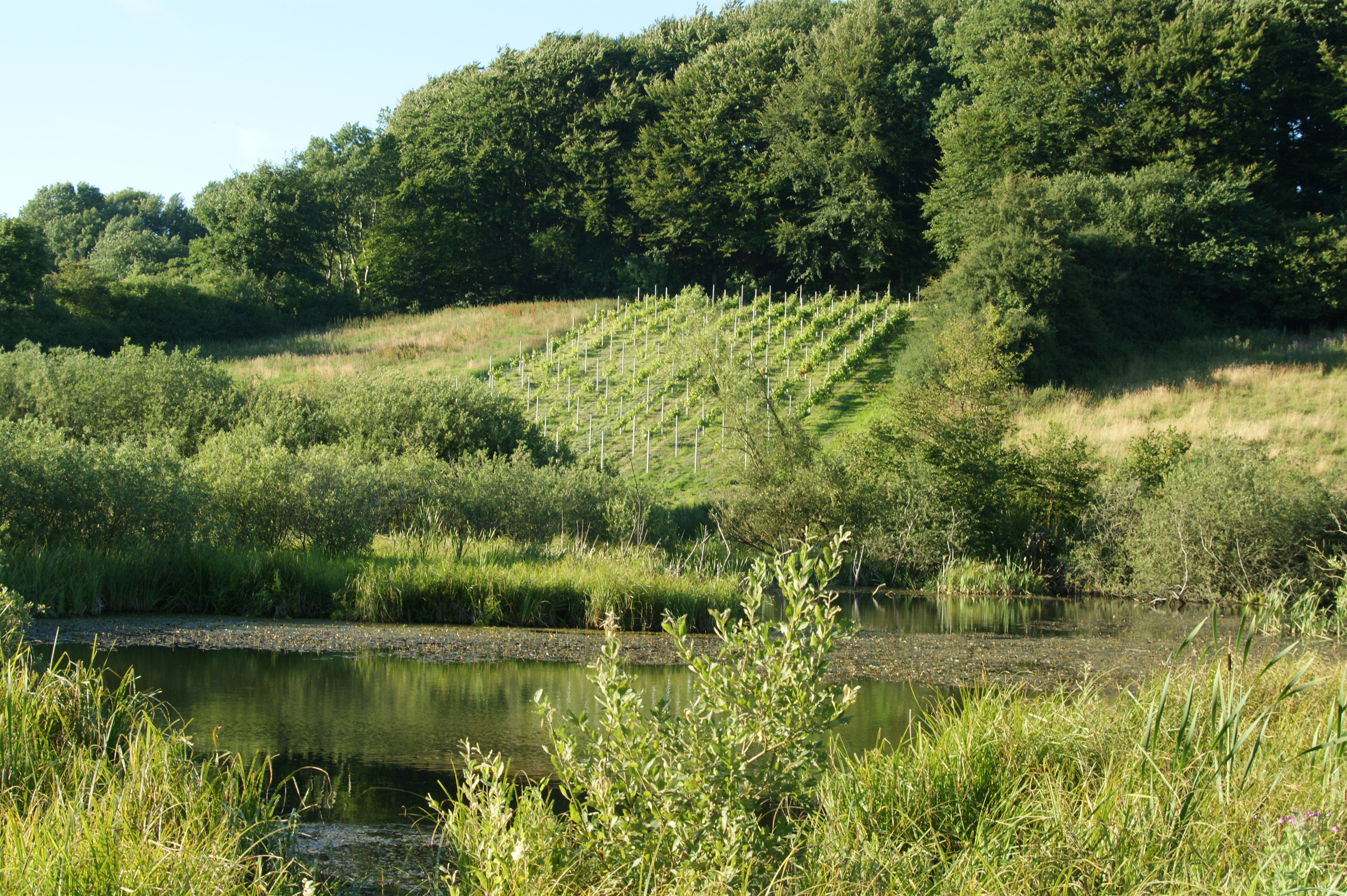
A small vineyard near Gram, Denmark

Danish wine is wine produced in Denmark. Denmark is a major consumer of wine, although it cultivates and produces very little. The climate is not ideal for viticulture, however climate change and the production of fruit wines have fostered a growing wine industry.

The majority of Danish wine is sold domestically; as of 2023, exports accounted for less than 7% of wine sales. Despite some favorable reviews by connoisseurs, Danish wine appeals to a niche market and is not a staple of Danish cuisine. Wine itself is commonly consumed in Denmark, however critics note that Danish wine is more expensive and lower in quality than many imported wines, while not appealing to the average consumer.

== History ==
Wine has been produced in Denmark since the 13th century, when it was produced by monasteries. This wine was not suitable for sale, and was only consumed by the monks who made it. Commercial wine production, however, did not begin in earnest until the 21st century. Wine production had previously been banned by the European Union in Denmark, due to the overproduction of wine in Europe. The ban was lifted in 1999, allowing up to 99 hectares to be used for wine cultivation in Denmark. Following the legalization of wine production, the 2001 vintage was the first year of Danish wine to be sold legally.

Despite its northern location, Denmark has been fostering a developing wine industry since the turn of the 21st century, and has benefited from climate change in order to cultivate grapes. In 2006, the 20 vineyards in the country together produced around 40,000 bottles of wine. In 2007, Danish wine gained prominence when a 2006 Dons Cuvée sparkling wine from Skæresøgård Vin won a silver medal in the 2007 Effervescents du Monde wine competition.

Between 2016 and 2022, wine production in Denmark tripled. In 2016, a total of 71 vineyards in Denmark covered 75 hectares and sold about 13 million DKK worth of wine. By 2022, 146 vineyards covered 173 hectares, produced 249 tons of grapes, and by 2023 sold 34 million DKK worth of wine. Although wine production has increased greatly since its legalization in 1999, Denmark remains a minor producer. Denmark, along with Belgium, Estonia, Ireland, Latvia, Lithuania, Malta, the Netherlands, Poland, Finland, and Sweden, did not produce enough wine to be reported by the European Union in their 2022 publication on vineyards in Europe.

== Cultivation ==
Grapes cultivated in Denmark are primarily for wine production, as they are too acidic to be eaten as table grapes. Although production of wine did not take off until the 21st century, testing of different grape varieties for hardiness and suitability in the region began in the 1980s and 1990s.

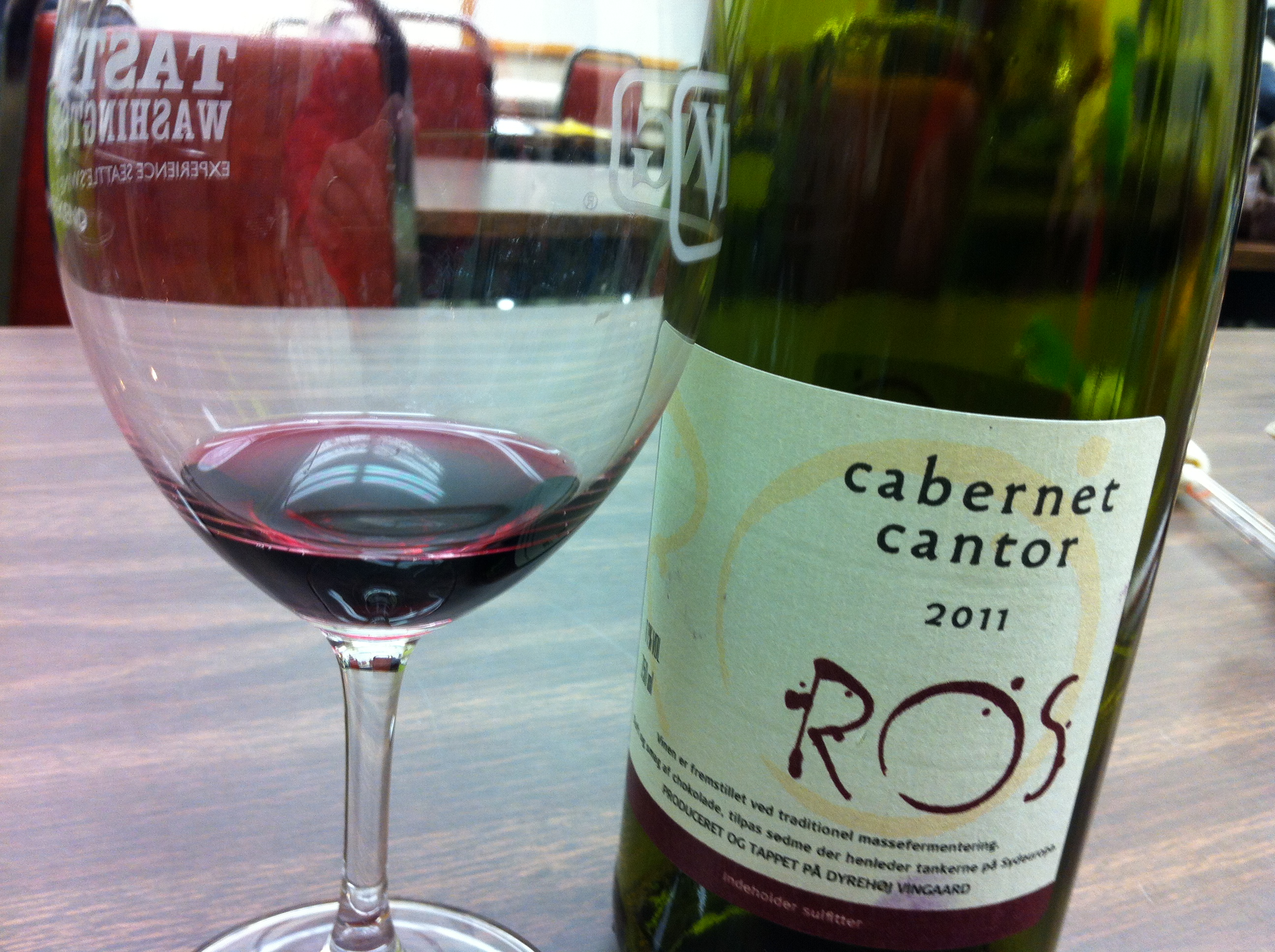
Danish wine made from Cabernet Cantor.

In the early 2000s, many emerging vineyards planted red grape varieties, however the climate is largely unsuitable for the production of red wine as they require long, warm autumns to ripen. Instead, white wine varieties have proven easier to cultivate as they require fewer days to ripen and can tolerate wet, cool autumns. In particular, sparkling wines have become popular among cultivators despite the complexity of the fermentation process, because grapes do not need to be fully ripe before being harvested.

As of 2024, the majority of vineyards are located east of the Great Belt, particularly in North Zealand; more than half of all vineyards are located on Zealand and Bornholm. There are also small vineyards in Jutland, Lolland, and Funen growing various grape varieties. Solaris and Rondo grapes are the most commonly cultvated varieties in Denmark; others include Bolero, Regent, Léon Millot, Muscari, Cabernet Cortis, Souvignier gris, and Orion.

== Fruit wines ==
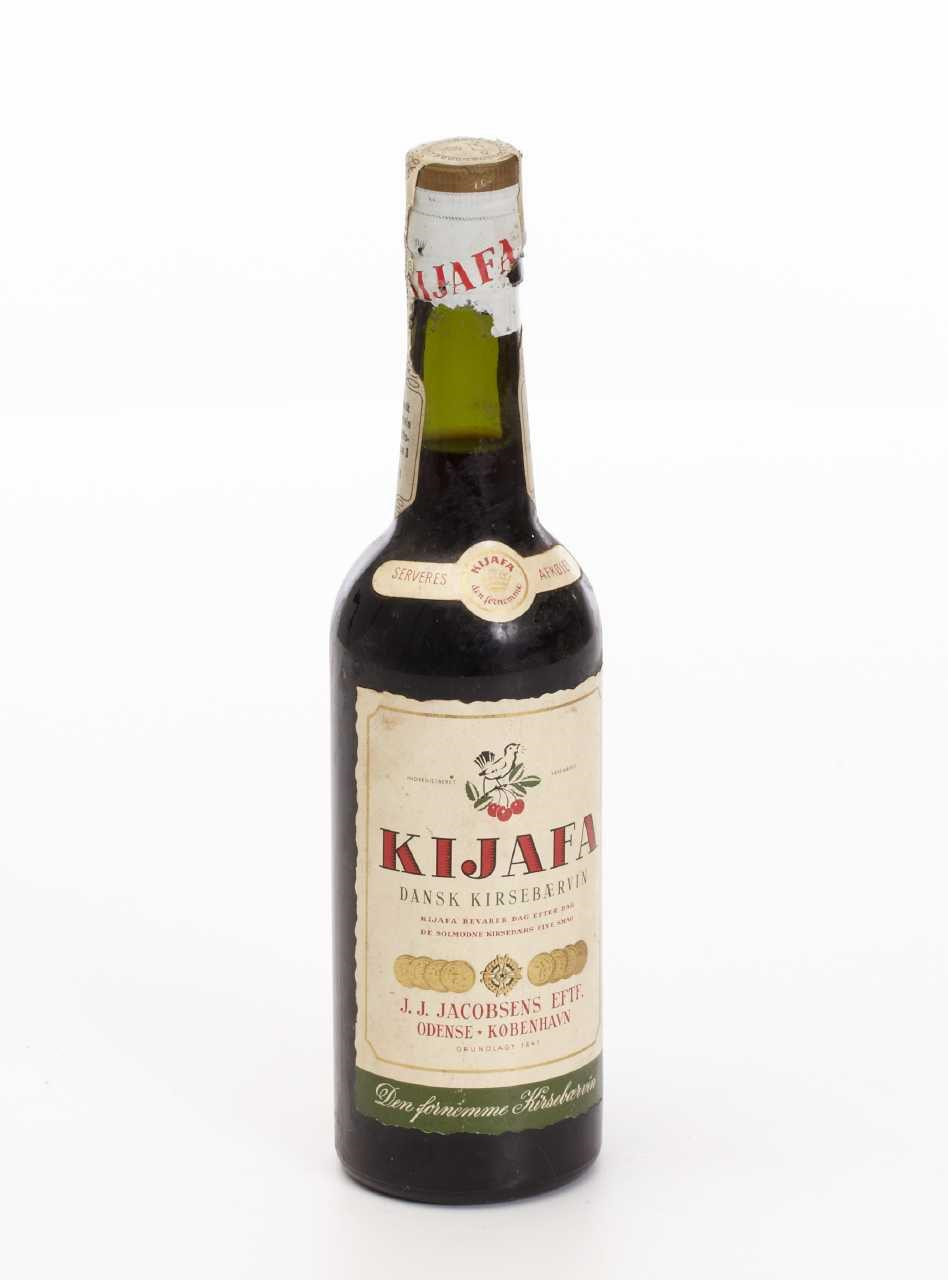
A bottle of cherry wine from Vingården on Funen, Denmark

Denmark has been a producer of fruit wines for many years, especially cherry wines (Danish: kirsebærvin), apple wines (Danish: æblevin), and plum wines. The Danish climate is very well suited for growing these fruits and the country has a quite large variety of unique cultivars. In particular, since 2006, new producers at Frederiksdal Manor on Lolland have experimented with cherry wines, to some acclaim.

An estimated 40,000 bottles of fruit wine were exported in 2015, primarily to Norway, Thailand, Germany, and China.

== See also ==
- Winemaking
- Agriculture in Denmark
- Danish cuisine
