= Dutch wine =

Wine making in Netherlands

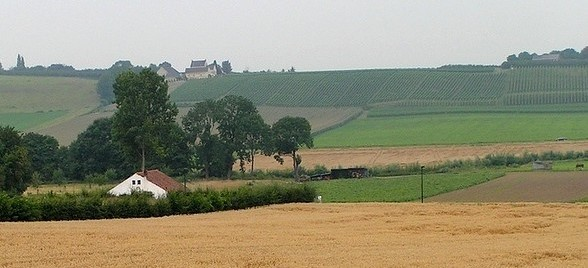
Wineries in the Jeker Valley (Jekerdal) in the border area between Maastricht, Netherlands, and Kanne, Belgium

Dutch wine (Dutch: Nederlandse wijn) is wine made in the Netherlands. Although a small producer of wine, it is nowadays a strong and growing branch of Dutch agriculture. Currently, the country has 180 commercial vineyards.

== History ==
It is assumed that Romans who were used to bringing their crops along with them could have successfully planted grapevines in Maastricht, called Traiectum ad Mosam.

The first mention of viniculture in what is now the Netherlands dates back to 968.

Modern production of wine was started in the 1970s.

== Wine regions of the Netherlands ==
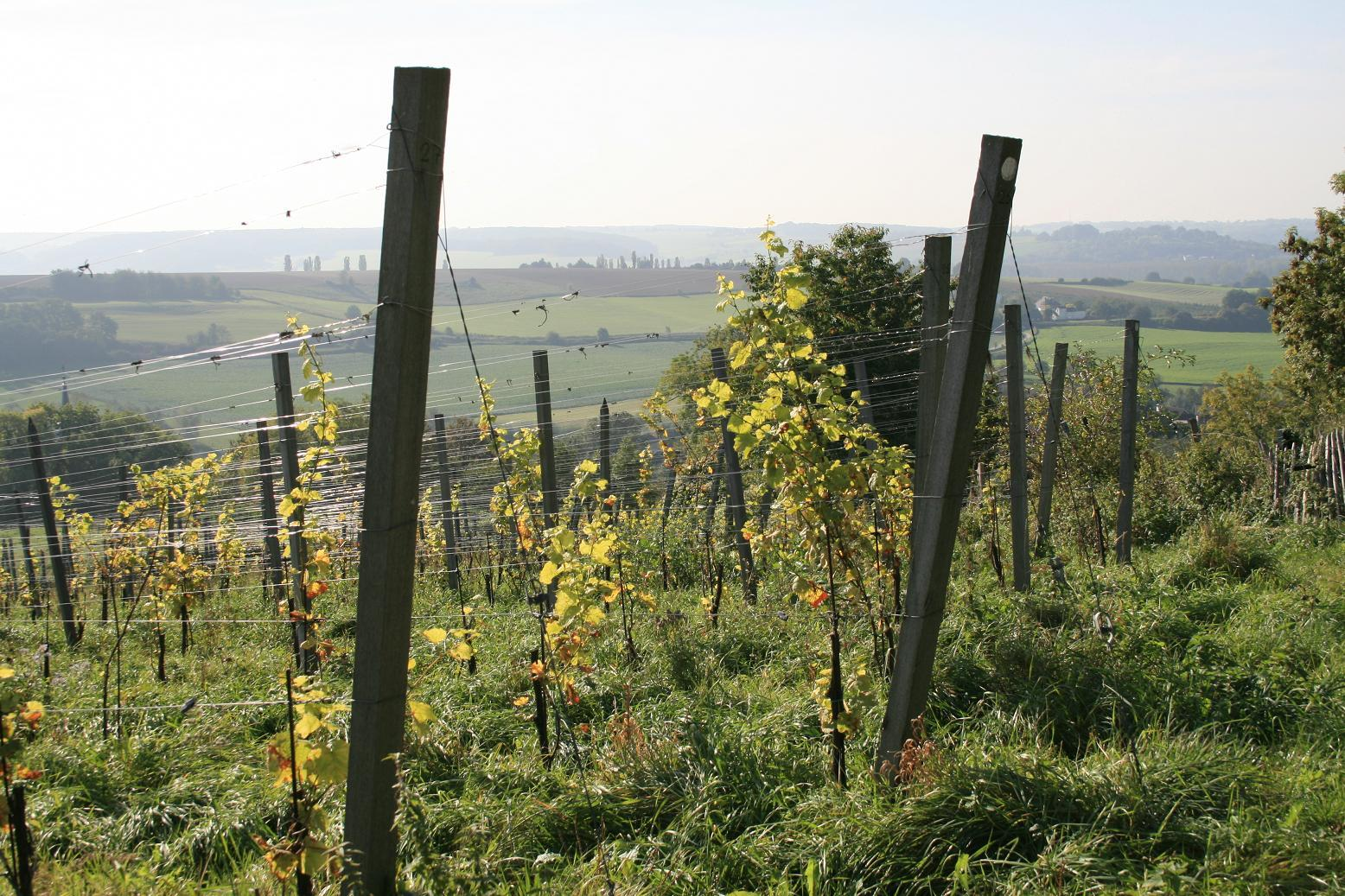
Vineyard Aldenborgh in Eys, Limburg

Most of the Dutch vineyards, collectively measuring 160 ha (2007), are to be found in the provinces of Gelderland and Limburg. In addition, there are vineyards in North Brabant, North Holland, Zeeland and more in northern Drenthe, Overijssel and Groningen.

== Climate ==
Because of the unfavourable Dutch climate, the classic international grapes Merlot and Cabernet Sauvignon are not planted on a large scale.

== Grapes ==
The following grape varieties are permitted by the applicable legislation (Verordening HPA Wijn 2009):

=== White ===
Auxerrois, Bacchus, Bianca, Chardonnay, Faber, Gewürztraminer, Hölder, Huxelrebe, Johanniter, Juwel, Kerner, Kernling, Merzling, Morio Muscat, Müller Thurgau, Orion, Ortega, Phoenix, Pinot blanc, Pinot gris/Ruländer, Rayon d'or, Reichensteiner, Riesling, Sauvignon blanc, Scheurebe, Schönburger, Seyval, Siegerrebe, Silcher, Solaris, Sylvaner, Würzer

=== Red ===
Cabernet Franc, Domina, Dornfelder, Dunkelfelder, Florental, Frühburgunder, Gamay, Landal 244 N, Léon Millot, Maréchal Foch, Meunier, Pinot noir, Plantet, Portugiezer, Regent, Rondo, St. Laurent, Triomphe d'Alsace, Zweigeltrebe

== See also ==
- Winemaking
