= Rondo (grape) =

Variety of grape

- Grape (Vitis)
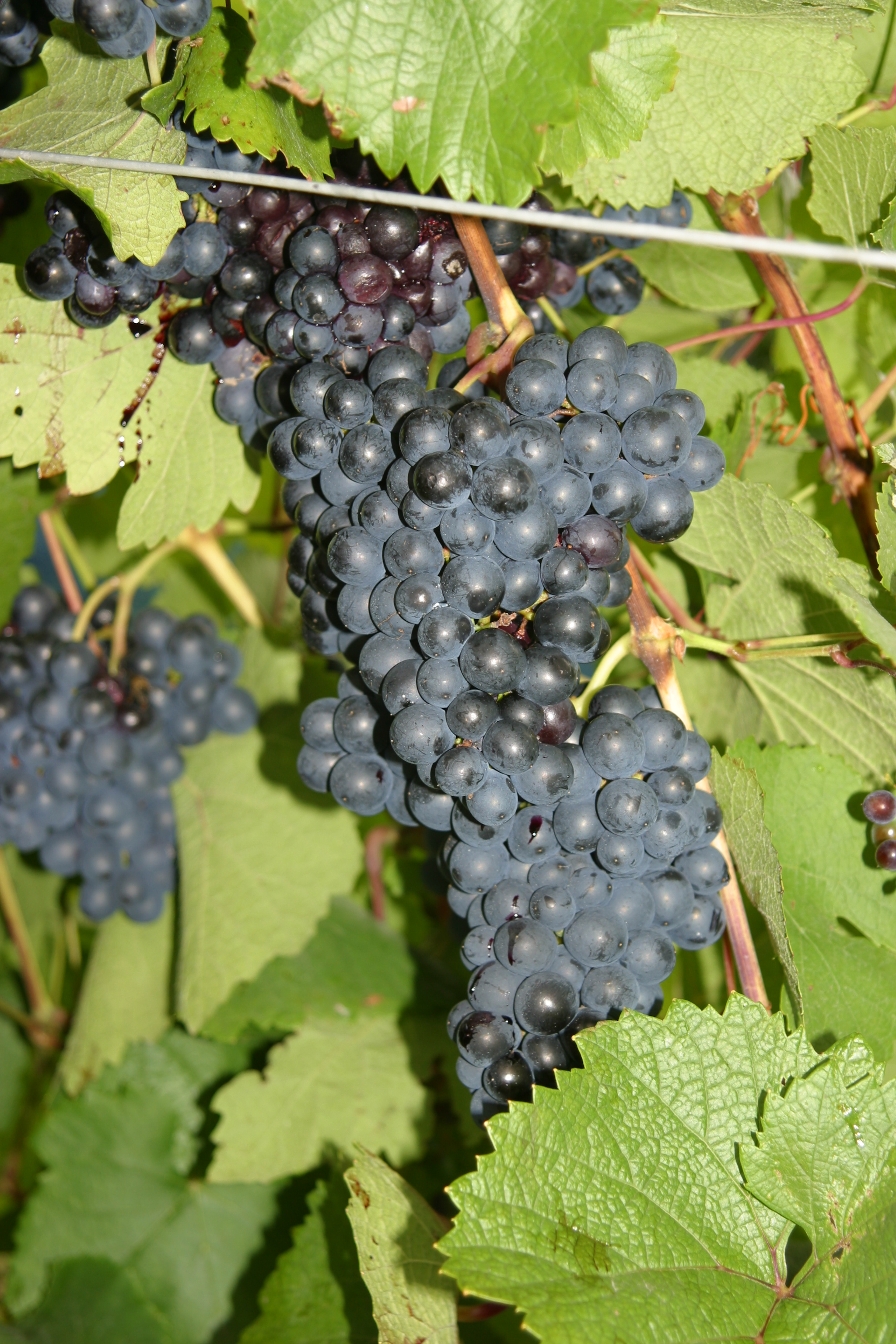
- Rondo grapes
- Color of berry skin: Noir
- Species: Officially Vitis vinifera but also has other species in its pedigree
- Also called: Geisenheim 6494-5 (Gm 6494-5)
- Origin: Czechoslovakia
- Original pedigree: Zarya Severa × St. Laurent
- Notable regions: Denmark, England, Ireland, Netherlands
- Breeder: Helmut Becker
- Breeding institute: Forschungsanstalt Geisenheim, Fachgebiet Rebenzüchtung und Rebenveredlung
- Year of crossing: 1964
- VIVC number: 14308

Rondo is a dark-skinned grape variety, used for making red wine. It is a hybrid grape or inter-specific crossing. It was created in 1964 by Professor Vilém Kraus in then-Czechoslovakia by crossing the varieties Zarya Severa (a hybrid which has Vitis amurensis in its pedigree) and St. Laurent. He offered it to Dr. Helmut Becker (1927-1990) of the Geisenheim Grape Breeding Institute who conducted further work on it, which explains why the grape is known under a Geisenheim designation. The variety was first planted for research and later in bigger scale in the mid 1980s by Thomas Walk Vineyard in Ireland under the name Amurensis Walk; it was named Rondo in 1997 (German Federal Office's Varieties Register).

This very early maturing variety possesses high resistance against winter frost and downy mildew from its Asiatic Vitis amurensis parent. However annual treatments against powdery mildew may still be necessary in the vineyards. Rondo produces a ruby-red wine which is also used for blending. Rondo is cultivated in many locations in northern Europe where dark-skinned Vitis vinifera varieties are difficult to ripen properly, as it tends to yield good colour and aroma even in those locations. Rondo is cultivated in Rheinhessen and in many locations in northern Europe including Denmark, England, Ireland, Wales, the Netherlands, Poland and Sweden.

In 2011 the British winery Denbies picked up a gold prize in the International Wine Challenge for their 2010 vintage Chalk Ridge Rose, a wine made entirely from Rondo grapes.

== Synonym ==
Geisenheim 6494-5 (Gm 6494-5).
