= Table wine =

Style of wine or a wine classification level

Table wine (rarely abbreviated TW) is a wine term with two different meanings: a style of wine and a quality level within wine classification.

In the United States, the term primarily designates a wine style: an ordinary wine that is not fortified or expensive and is not usually sparkling.

In the European Union wine regulations, the term is the lower of two overall quality categories, the higher of which is quality wines produced in specified regions (QWPSR). All levels of national wine classification systems within the EU correspond to either TW or QWPSR, although the terms that actually appear on wine labels are defined by national wine laws with the EU regulations as a framework.

Most EU countries have a national classification called table wine in the country's official language. Examples include vin de table in France, vino da tavola or sometimes vino da pasto (pasto meaning meal) in Italy, vino de mesa in Spain, vinho de mesa in Portugal, vin de masă in Romania, Tafelwein in Germany, and επιτραπέζιος οίνος (epitrapézios oínos) in Greece. These classifications generally represent the lowest level of classification in their country.

== United States ==
The Alcohol and Tobacco Tax and Trade Bureau and Code of Federal Regulations define table wine as grape wine having a maximum alcoholic content of 14 percent alcohol by volume. Wines between 14% and 24% ABV are known as dessert wines. Table wine may also be designated using terms such as light wine, light white wine, red table wine, sweet table wine, etc.

== European Union ==
European Union guidelines stipulate that all wine produced must fall into one of two categories: table wine or the superior quality wines produced in specified regions (often referred to as quality wine psr). Within the category of table wines, a difference is made between "plain" table wines, which are only allowed to display the country of origin, and table wines with geographical indication, which may indicate a region of origin and are a form of protected geographical indication (PGI) applied to wine.

For the lowest vin de table level in France, the producers must use postal codes to prevent the name of an appellation from appearing even in fine print on the label or its vintage date (though "lot numbers" which can bear a striking resemblance to dates are permitted). The new appellation vin de France permits a vintage date.

=== List of national table wine designations ===
The following national levels of wine classification correspond to table wines and table wines with geographical indication.

| Country | Table wines with geographical indication | Other table wines |
|---|---|---|
| Austria | Landwein | |
| Belgium | Landwijn (Dutch), Vin de pays (French) | |
| Brazil | | Vinho de Mesa, "Table Wine" |
| Bulgaria | Pегионално вино (Regionalno vino), "Regional wine" | |
| Cyprus | Τοπικός Οίνος (Topikós Oínos), "Regional wine" | |
| Czech Republic | Zemské víno, "Country wine" | Stolní víno, "Table Wine" |
| Denmark | Regional vin, "Regional wine" | |
| France | Vin de pays, "Country wine"; Vin de France (new category from 2010) | |
| Germany | Landwein, "Regional wine" | |
| Greece | ονομασία κατά παράδοση (onomasía katá parádosi), "Traditional appellation"; τοπικός οίνος (topikós oínos), "Country wine" | |
| Hungary | Tájbor, "Country wine" | |
| Italy | Indicazione geografica tipica (IGT), may in some areas also be written in German as Landwein or in French as Vin de pays | |
| Luxembourg | Marque Nationale - Appellation Contrôlée, "National Brand - Controlled Appellation" | |
| Malta | Indikazzjoni Ġeografika Tipika (I.G.T.) | |
| Netherlands | Landwijn, "Regional wine" | |
| North Macedonia | Регионално вино, Verë rajonale, "Regional wine" | Трпезно вино, Verë tryeze, "Table wine" |
| Portugal | Vinho regional, "Regional wine" | |
| Romania | Vin cu indicație geografică, "Wine with Geographical Indication" | |
| Russia | | Столовое вино (Stolovoye vino), "Table Wine" |
| Serbia | Регионално вино (Regionalno vino), "Regional wine" | Стоно вино (Stono vino), "Table Wine" |
| Slovenia | Deželno vino s priznano geografsko oznako (Deželno vino PGO), "Regional wine - Recognized Geographical Indication" | |
| Spain | Vino de la tierra, "Regional wine" | |
| United Kingdom | Regional wine | |

== Distribution ==
The fraction of national production classified as table wine varies dramatically from country to country. As of 2000, in France, a majority (by volume) of wine is vin de table, while in Germany only 5% is deutscher Tafelwein. Table wine from anywhere in the EU can be blended together to produce European table wine.

European table wines are generally made from the highest-yielding sites and vinified in an industrial manner. In the 1950s, when per capita consumption of wine was much higher, there was a need for vast quantities of cheap wine, but now much of it goes into the European Union's troublesome "wine lake". Even today it is possible in France or Spain to purchase a litre of thin, pale wine, packaged in a box rather than a bottle, for the equivalent of a couple of U.S. dollars.

== Naming contradictions ==
In contradiction to the presumed order, exceptional table wines are uncommon in Europe, but do exist. Ambitious wine-making outcomes may be classified as mere "table wine" if they are made from non-traditional grapes or with unconventional wine making processes. Even wines made with every measure of care (such as low vine yields and hand harvesting) and grown on sites otherwise entitled to a prestigious appellation may be denied status.

The best-known examples are the wines called Super Tuscans, which are made either with more than allowed quantities of international varieties (grapes not indigenous to Italy such as Merlot or Cabernet Sauvignon) or without the once mandated inclusion of small proportions of Canaiolo, Malvasia and Trebbiano per the relevant Tuscan appellation (i.e. Montevertine's Pergole Torte).

In 1992, Italy created the Indicazione geografica tipica (IGT) specifically to permit Super Tuscans to leave the table wine classification and become quality wine. Still, wherever legitimacy in a given appellation is stipulated by something more than a geographic boundary, one may find producers willing to ignore limitations in pursuit of extreme quality.

In common usage vin de table is the fourth and lowest ranked wine under the French wine classification. These wines are the cheapest to buy and to make (they can be bought from €0,80), and are generally drunk accompanying a midday meal or used to make wine-based cocktails.

== See also ==
- House wine
- List of grape varieties
- Wine vintages
