= Old World wine =

Wine made in Europe

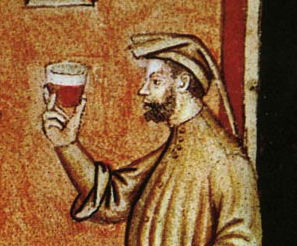
Old World wines refers to wines that come from regions with a long documented history of wine production

Old World wine refers primarily to wine made in Europe but can also include other regions of the Mediterranean basin with long histories of winemaking such as North Africa and the Near East. The phrase is often used in contrast to "New World wine" which refers primarily to wines from New World wine regions such as Japan, the United States, Canada, Mexico, Australia, New Zealand, Brazil, Argentina, Chile and South Africa. The term "Old World wine" does not refer to a homogeneous style with "Old World wine regions" like Austria, France, Georgia, Hungary, Germany, Israel, Italy, Portugal, Romania, Spain and Switzerland each making vastly different styles of wine even within their own borders. Rather, the term is used to describe general differences in viticulture and winemaking philosophies between the Old World regions where tradition and the role of terroir lead versus the New World where science and the role of the winemaker are more often emphasized. In recent times, the globalization of wine and advent of flying winemakers have lessened the distinction between the two terms with winemakers in one region being able to produce wines that can display the traits of the other region—i.e. an "Old World style" wine being produced in a New World wine region like California or Chile and vice versa.

"Old World" can also mean a wine style made for centuries by small winemakers intended to be consumed as a daily beverage to accompany a meal. These food and wine "pairings," so famous today (e.g. Chianti and Italian food) developed over generations by trial and error. The small village winemaker succeeded or failed on his wine's reputation as an acceptable "table" wine, be it highly expensive or budget priced.

By comparison, "New World" wines, while also being food friendly, are created to meet the tastes of contemporary wine drinkers. Contemporary wine drinkers, especially those in the large U.S. market, consume wine as a stand-alone beverage as much as a beverage to accompany a meal. Thus, the immediate "taste" is the overwhelming criterion by which a new-world wine is judged by the contemporary wine consumer.

== Influences ==
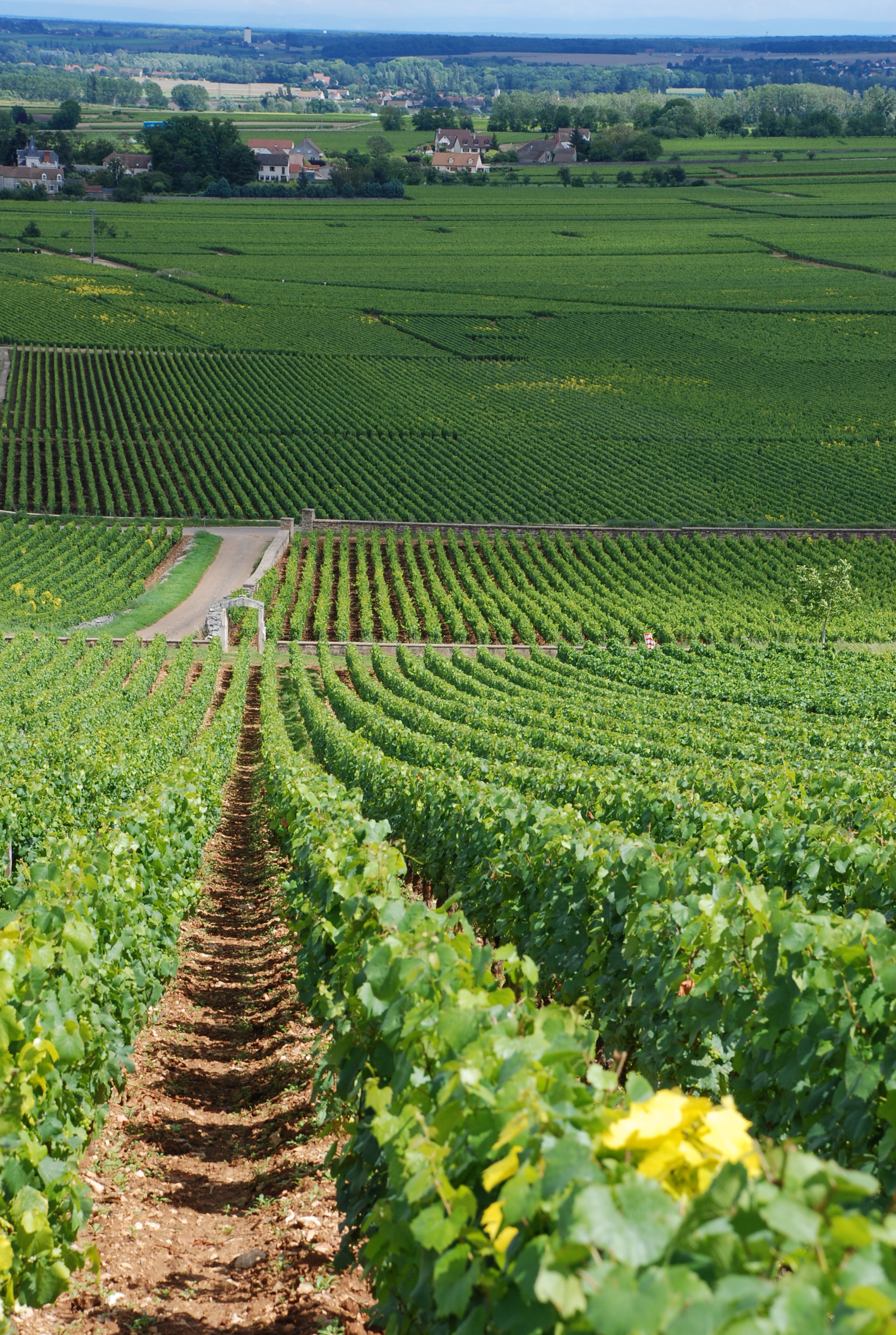
In Old World winemaking, the terroir of a region is of paramount importance with wines from a region, such as Montrachet (pictured), being labeled with the region's name rather than the grape variety (such as Chardonnay).

The two most guiding influences of Old World style winemaking are that of tradition and terroir. The former refers to the long history of a wine region, while the latter refers to geography and the unique characteristics of a place. The centuries-old histories of many Old World wine regions have given the regions time to develop and adapt techniques that presumably best suit a particular vine growing area. These can include which grape varieties to plant, trellising methods, maximum permitted yields, as well as winemaking techniques. Over time, these traditional practices became enshrined in local regulations such as the French Appellation d'origine contrôlée (AOC), Italian Denominazione di origine controllata (DOC), Spanish Denominación de Origen (DO) and Portuguese Denominação de Origem Controlada (DOC) laws.

Terroir is often used to describe the aspects of a wine region such as soil, climate and topography that are often out of the winemaker's control. They are the unique attributes that, theoretically, make a Sangiovese based wine from Chianti taste different from a Sangiovese-based wine made anywhere else in the world even if exactly the same winemaking techniques are used. While wines in the New World are often labeled based on the varietal (such as Chardonnay or Tempranillo), wines in the Old World are generally labeled based on the region or place that they come from (such as Montrachet or Ribera del Duero). This is because Old World winemakers believe that the unique terroir-driven characteristics of where a wine comes from plays a more distinct role in shaping the resulting wine than the grape variety itself.

== Viticulture ==
Viticulture in most of the Old World wine regions dates back to several hundred or even thousands of years with the Phoenicians, Greeks, Thracians and Romans establishing some of the earliest vineyards. Over centuries, these Old World wine regions have developed viticultural techniques and practices adapted around their unique climates and landscapes. Many of these practices are enshrined in local wine laws and regulations such as the French Appellation d'origine contrôlée (AOC) regulations. One distinction between an Old World vineyard and a New World vineyard is generally the high vine density and close proximity of plantings in the Old World, which were often planted years before the use of mechanical agriculture became popular. In regions such as Bordeaux, vines were often planted 1 metre (3 ft) apart in rows that were also separated by 1 metre (3 ft) with spacing that was sufficient for pruning and harvesting being done manually. In New World wine regions like Australia, which was quick to adopt mechanical techniques, vines were often planted apart 3.7 metres (12 ft) by 2.5 metres (8 ft). While spacing between vine rows has shrunk in many Old World wine regions began adopting mechanical techniques in the late 20th century, some regions are still characterized by the high density of vines in their vineyards.

One of these exceptions to the Mediterranean origins of Viticultural tradition is in Hungary, whose knowledge of Winemaking came with them from Central Asia. Evidence for this is found in the writings of Ibn Rustah as well as the Hungarian word for wine (bor). Which is unique in Europe because of its origins in Middle Persian (transported via Turkic) as opposed to the Sanskrit word vena that most other European words for wine descend from.

== Winemaking ==
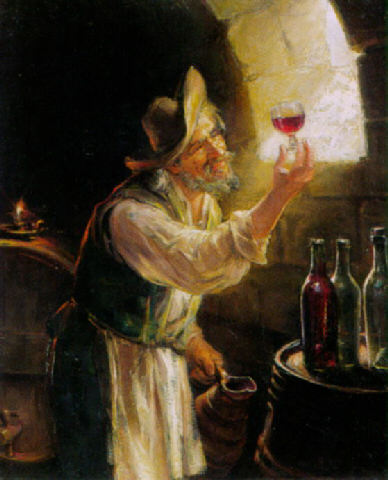
In Old World wine making, the role of the winemaker is minimized compared to New World wine making.

Old World winemaking is often terroir driven with emphasis being placed on how well the wine communicates the sense of place where it originated. For example, a winemaker making a Riesling from the Mosel will often try to highlight the unique traits of the Mosel wine region (such as its slate soils) with the wine expressing those traits in the form of minerality. In the New World, emphasis is often placed on the winemaker and the techniques used to bring out the fruit flavors of a wine (a style known as "fruit driven"). New World winemakers tend to be more open to experimenting with new scientific advances (such as the use of enzymes as an additive) while the terroir influence of Old World winemakers will often attempt to downplay the role of the winemaker and avoid techniques that may mask or distort the expression of terroir. Old World winemakers tend to be more open to use of wild, ambient yeast during the fermentation process as a part of the terroir while New World winemakers tend to favor cultured yeast strains.

Other techniques associated with Old World winemakers include higher fermentation temperatures and a period of extended maceration following fermentation where the wine can leech more phenolic compounds from the grape skins. This can create more tannic and austere wines with more layers of complexity that require longer periods of bottle aging in order to mature. In contrast, the technique of transferring the must into oak barrels during fermentation and inducing malolactic fermentation early is more commonly associated with New World wine regions and wines that are softer and mature earlier.

== Regions ==
Eurasian wine regions with a long history of viticulture are typically classified as "Old World". These include:

- Albania
- Armenia
- Austria
- Azerbaijan
- Bulgaria
- Croatia
- Czech Republic
- Cyprus
- France
- Georgia
- Germany
- Greece
- Hungary
- Iran
- Israel
- Italy
- Moldova
- North Macedonia
- Montenegro
- Netherlands
- Poland
- Portugal
- Romania
- Serbia
- Slovakia
- Slovenia
- Spain
- Switzerland
- Turkey

New world like

- New Zealand
- South Africa
- United states
- Chile
- Argentina
- Japan

== See also ==
- European Spirits Organisation
- Irrigation in viticulture
