= Triomphe d'Alsace =

Variety of grape

- Grape (Vitis)
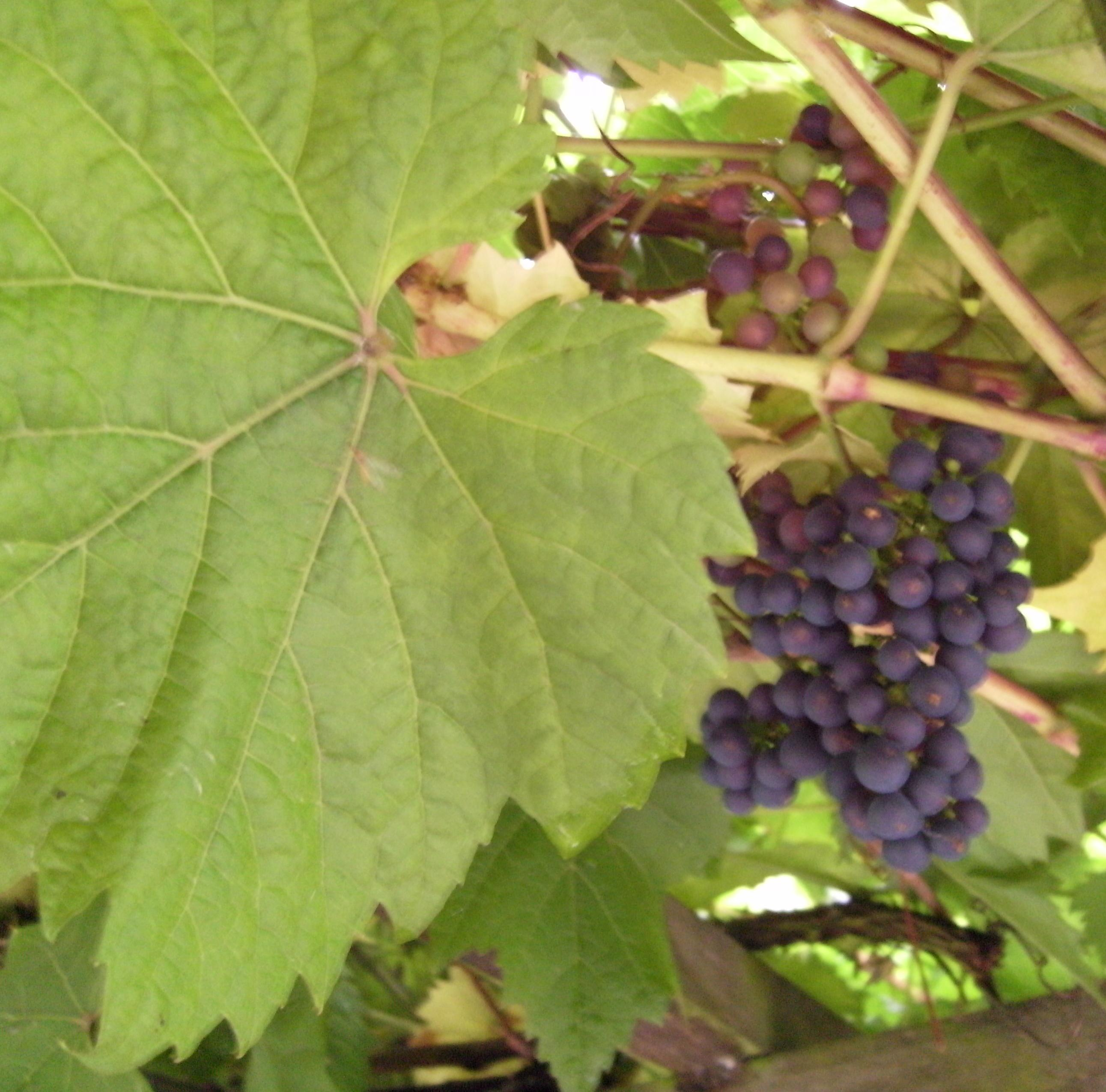
- Triomphe d'Alsace grapes growing in characteristic small bunches at Wolverhampton, England
- Color of berry skin: Black
- Also called: 319-1 Kuhlmann, Triomphe
- Notable regions: England, Netherlands
- Notable wines: English and Dutch reds and rosés
- Ideal soil: Most
- VIVC number: 12650

Wine characteristics
- General: Light tannins
- Cool climate: Raspberry, blackberry

Triomphe d'Alsace is a black grape variety of Franco-German origin, commonly grown in the United Kingdom.

== Origin and history ==
Triomphe d'Alsace was produced by French grapevine breeder Eugène Kuhlmann (1858-1932) from about 1911 at the Institut Viticole Oberlin at Colmar in Alsace, then a part of Germany. First he crossed the American River Bank Grape, Vitis riparia with another American species, the Bush Grape, Vitis rupestris. The resultant hybrid was then crossed with Goldriesling, a variety of the wine grape, Vitis vinifera, developed about twenty years earlier by Christian Oberlin. From a similar set of crosses came a range of sibling varieties like Lucie Kuhlmann, Léon Millot, Marechal Foch, Maréchal Joffre, Pinard, Etoile I and Etoile II.

The variety was not brought to market until 1921, by which time Alsace had been restored to France following World War I.

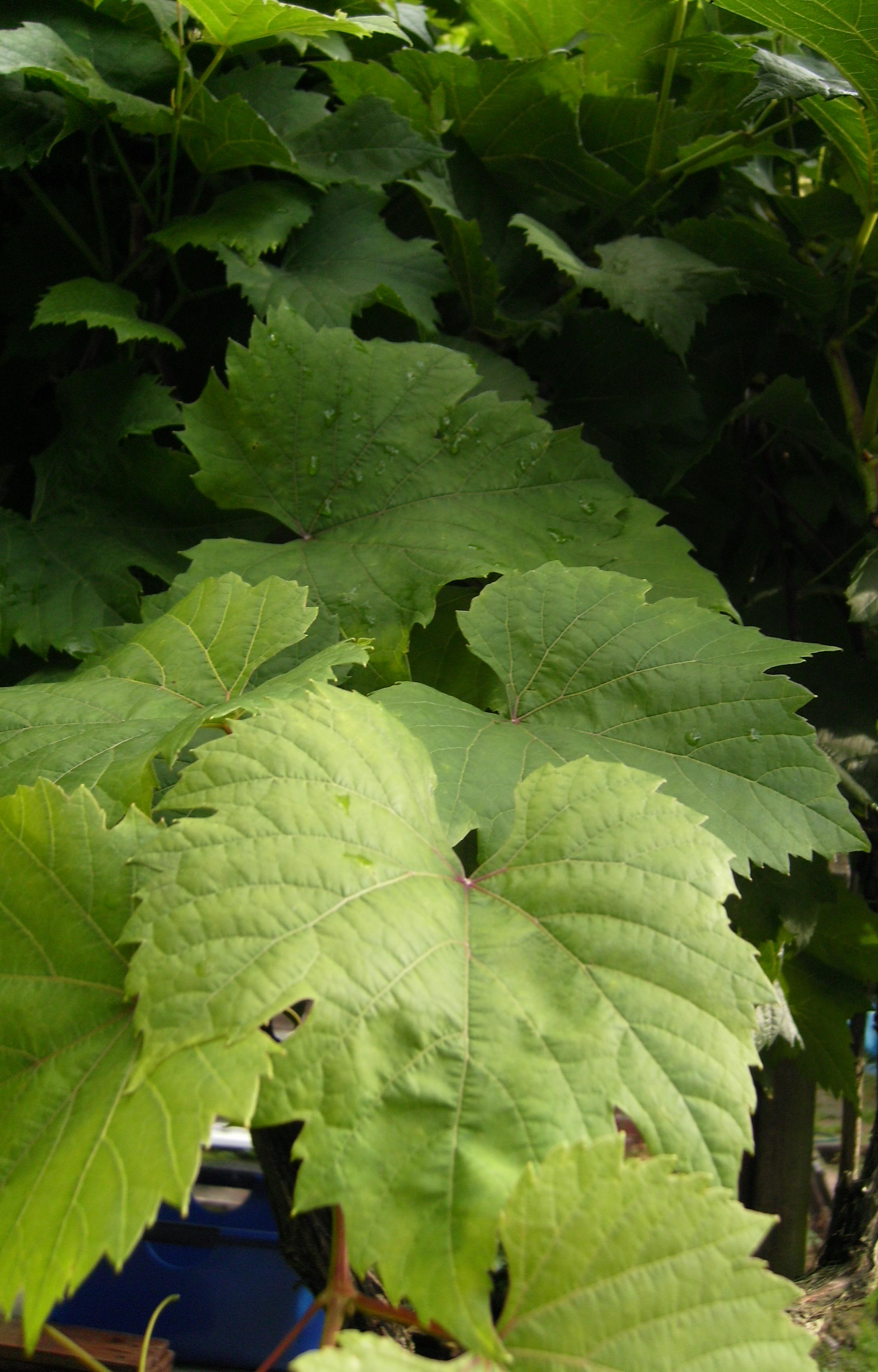
The large, three-lobed leaves of Triomphe d'Alsace

== Description ==
The Triomphe d'Alsace vine is fairly vigorous and very robust, growing rapidly even in cool climates. The leaves are not deeply indented and can grow to a very large size, producing a dense canopy which has to be thinned to promote ripening and to suppress mildew. They become very tough and leathery with age, although they can be stuffed and eaten when young. The grapes are generally small and grow in a profusion of small bunches. They ripen early, and often suddenly, even in cool and damp summers, although harvest may have to be postponed as late as October. Good crops are possible at least in the Midlands and North of England, and still further north in favourable situations. However, the variety is not so robust against disease and can suffer from mildew if the autumn is exceptionally wet.

In England, the vines need to be pruned hard in the winter to keep them under control, as they will grow to great size if not cut back. It is important to prune while growth is completely absent, as the stems bleed sap profusely once the growing season begins.

Wine made from the Triomphe d'Alsace can vary from a very deep, almost black, purple to a rosé, depending on the method of extraction. Although the sugar content is quite high, under English conditions it will usually require some chaptalization to bring the level of alcohol into the 10-12% range. The red wine is considered to have a slight flavour of raspberry.

== Regions ==
Triomphe d'Alsace has never been widely grown in its countries of origin but did find a niche in the wine of colder countries. It is found in Dutch wine and in Wine from the United Kingdom. It was widely planted in English vineyards until the 1990s but has since become less fashionable. It remains a favourite among amateur winemakers and gardeners because of its ease of cultivation and its value as a shade plant.

== Synonyms ==
Triomphe d'Alsace is also known as

- 319-1 Kuhlmann – after the breeder who developed it
- Triomphe – an abbreviated form

== See also ==
- Red wine
- Glossary of winemaking terms

== Bibliography ==
Pierre Galet: Dictionnaire encyclopédique des cépages Hachette Livre, 1. édition 2000 ISBN 2-01-236331-8
