= Polish wine =

Wine making in Poland

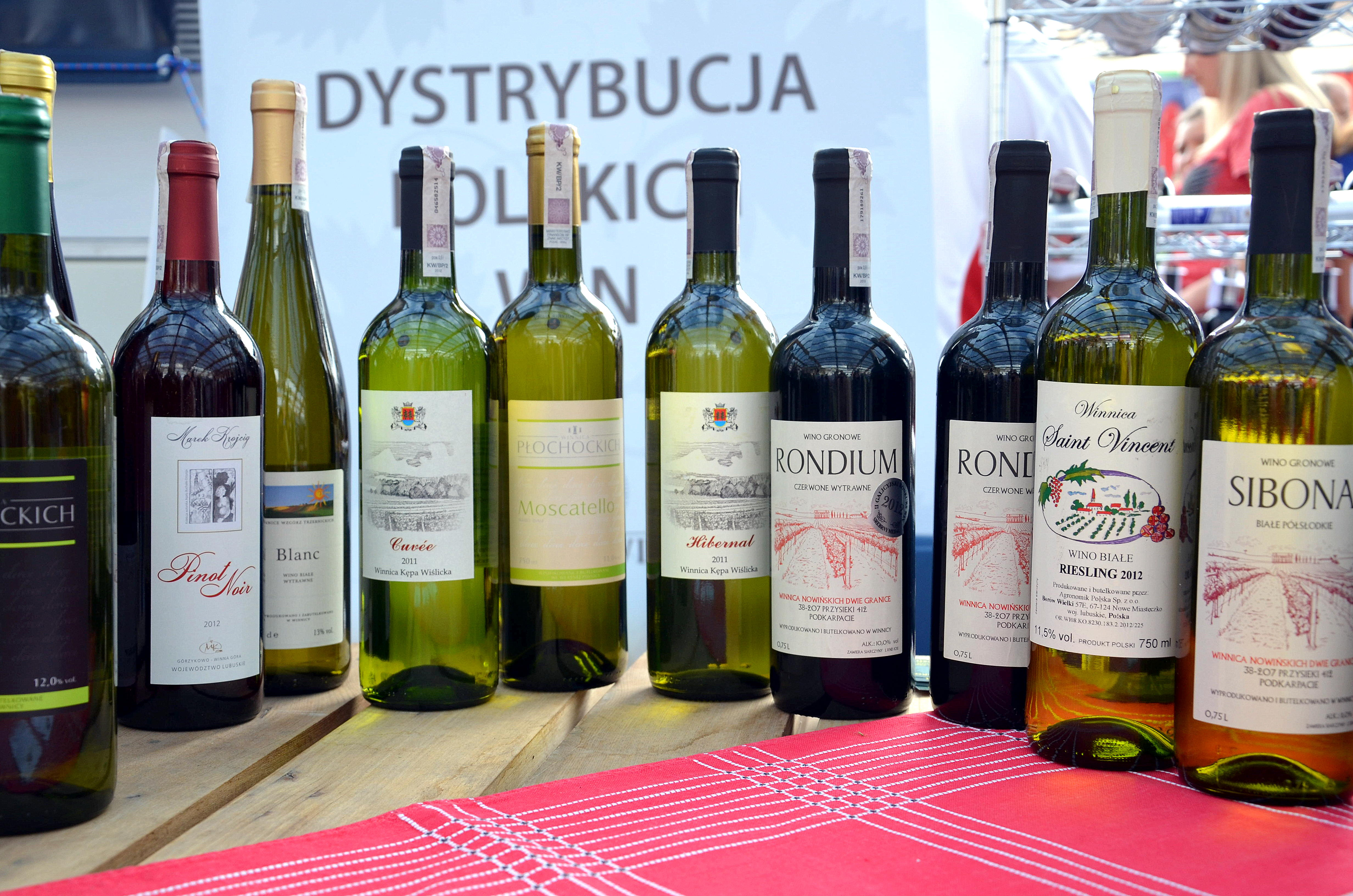
Bottles of Polish wine

Polish wine (Polish: Polskie wino) viticulture and origins have a history dating back to the nation's founding in the tenth century under the Piast dynasty. Like other old world wine producers, many traditional grape varieties still survive in Poland, perfectly suited to their local wine hills. The most popular varieties of grapes for the production of red wine are Regent, Rondo, Pinot Noir, Maréchal Foch, Cabernet Cortis, Tryumf Alzacji, Cascade, and Dornfelder. For white wine production, Solaris, Riesling, Seyval Blanc, Pinot Gris, Johanniter, Jutrzenka, Hibernal, Aurora, Bianka, Traminer, and Siberia are mostly used. Following the Second World War, most wineries were nationalized under the Polish People's Republic communist regime. After the collapse of communism and return to capitalism, the market economy returned, international wine companies moved back in and a period of consolidation followed. Modern wine-production methods have taken over in the larger wineries, and EU-style wine regulations have been adopted, guaranteeing the quality of the wine. Today, wine production in Poland is an industry with 151 officially registered wineries (2016/2017 season) to sell and produce grape table wines in Poland as defined by the national wine laws that came into being in 2008 and were updated later on.

Some of the oldest wineries are Winnica Equus, Adoria Vineyards, Winnica Jaworek, Winnica Maria Anna, Winnica Płochockich, Winnica Stara Winna Góra, Winnica Miłosz, Winnica Wzgórza Trzebnickie. There exists a very lively winery and viticulture scene throughout the country with especially strong grouping in the regions near the city of Zielona Góra and in the west of the country, Wrocław in the south-west, Kraków in the south, the Podkarpacie region and Kazimierz Dolny in south-east. There are also a few wineries in the "Northern Poland" wine region. Winnica Jura, a new project of establishing a 6 hectare organic vineyard, is currently underway near Kraków.

Scientists in the American National Academy of Sciences foresee significant global warming in the coming years. As a result, by 2050 Poland may have become a leading global wine producer.

== History ==
Winery in Poland was introduced during the nations founding with Christianity and the first vineyards were cultivated by and wineries were established by Benedictine and Cistercian monks; however, wine at first was produced for religious purposes mainly. The fruitful time Polish winery was the fourteenth century, during which many wineries were operating mainly in Silesia, Zielona Góra, Poznań, Toruń, Płock, Sandomierz, Lublin and Kraków. Intensive development of wine making was in the age of enlightenment, when the viticulture and wine production were carried out in the Podole. Besides Vitis vinifera, hybrid varieties resistant to adverse climatic conditions were grown. After World War II, according to the authorities, two wine-growing regions were designated: the West (Zielona Góra region and Lower Silesia) and the Central (along the Pilica river). Vineyards planted in the communistic economy, however, have begun to bear losses, and in the 1960s, it was focused on the production of fruit wines. The tradition of viticulture and winery has been reborn in the last ten years, resulting in development of small vineyards producing excellent wines for the local market. Poland is located in the zone of the continental climate, where there are also wine regions such as Burgundy and the Loire Valley, Rioja, Piedmont and most of the vineyards of Austria, the Czech Republic, Slovakia or Romania.

== Wine growing regions in Poland ==
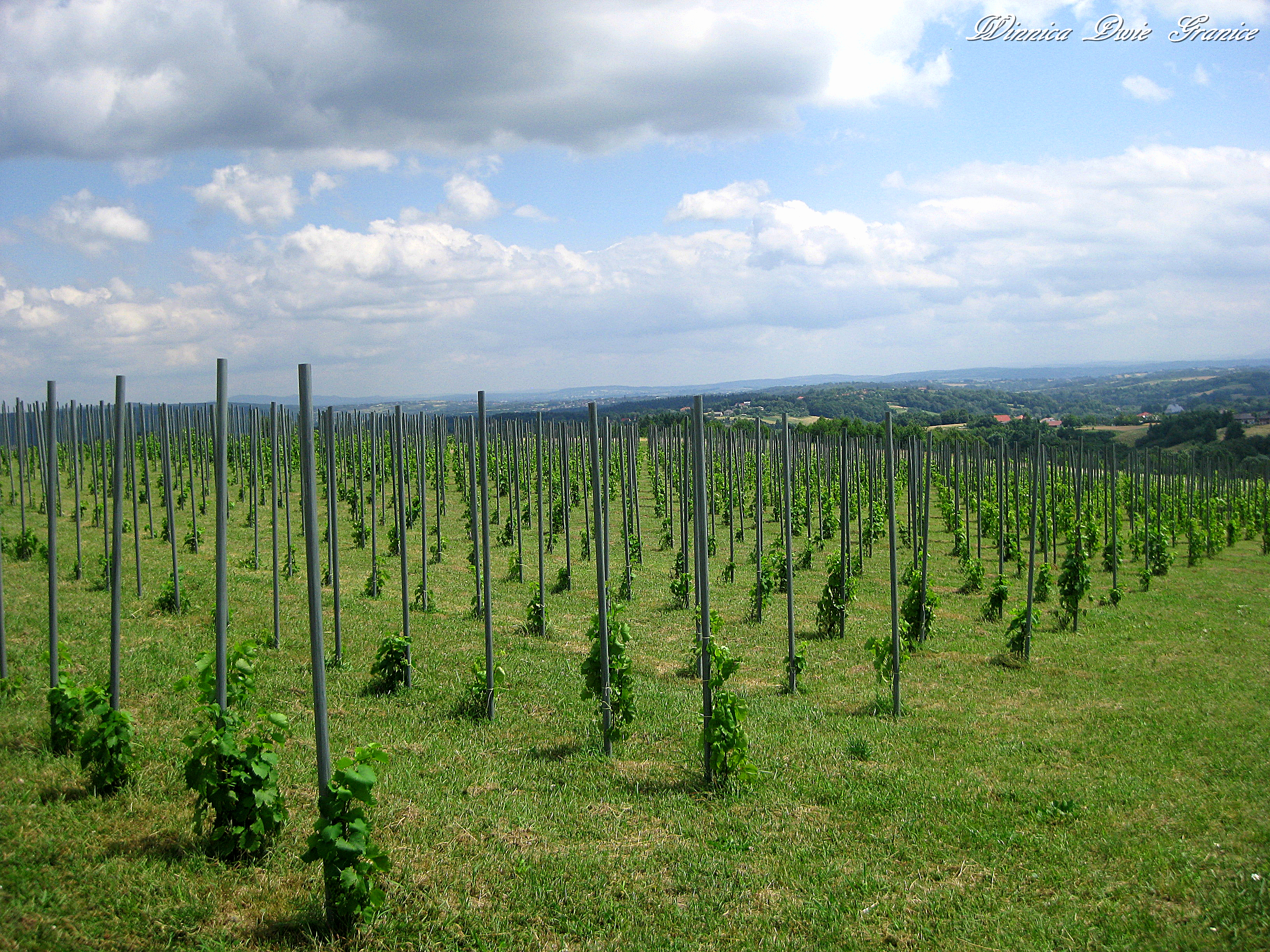
Winery in Bączal Górny, Subcarpathian Voivodeship

- Lublin
- Lower Silesia
- Lesser Poland
- Subcarpathian Voivodeship

In the past, wine production was concentrated mainly in southern Poland (Lublin, Lower Silesia, Lesser Poland and Subcarpathian Voivodeship); nowadays wine is produced all across the country.

== See also ==
- Beer in Poland
- Mead in Poland
- Grzane wino
- Winemaking
- Agriculture in Poland
