= Zarya severa =

Variety of grape

- Grape (Vitis)
- Species: Vitis vinifera
- VIVC number: 13399

Zarya severa (Northern Lights) is a red grape variety. It is a descendant of a selection of the Far Eastern wild grape Vitis amurensis and a Russian variety 'Seedling of Malingre Précoce' and is thus a hybrid vine. Originated by Yakov Potapenko and Elena Zakharova at the Mitchurin Central Genetic Laboratory in Tambov Oblast, Russia in 1936. Because of its high winter frost resistance as well as its resistance to downy mildew, this variety, often mentioned by breeders in Eastern Europe, became a major breeding stock in the search for new varieties.

Synonym: Zora Severa

Parentage: Seedling of Malingre Précoce x Vitis amurensis

== Descendants ==
In 1964 Professor Vilém Kraus in Czechoslovakia crossed the varieties Zarya Severa x St. Laurent. Prof. Kraus offered the seedlings to Prof. Dr. Helmut Becker (1927-1990), then at the Geisenheim Grape Breeding Institute, who recognized the importance of this material and did further breeding. From this, now called Gm 6494, the seedling Gm 6494-5 was selected due to its special performance, and later propagated under the name Rondo as a separate variety and first put into cultivation by Thomas Walk in Ireland.

Zarya Severa is also a grandparent of the white grape Solaris, which is of great importance in the marginal areas of northern Europe.

Through the breeding of Gm 6494, Zarya Severa was likewise ancestral to the new varieties Bronner, Baron, Cabernet Carbon, and Prior. While previously thought to also be ancestral to Souvignier Gris, later DNA analysis confirmed Souvignier Gris to be a cross between Seyval Blanc and Zähringer

== Bibliography ==
- Pierre Galet: Dictionnaire encyclopédique des cépages. Hachette, Paris 2000, ISBN 978-2-0123-6331-1.
