= Irish wine =

Wine making in Ireland

Irish wine is produced by a small number of vineyards, primarily in the south and east of the country where the climate is most favourable. Although viticulture in Ireland remains small-scale, the industry is growing, and the country is recognised as an emerging wine-producer by the European Commission.

== History ==
The Celts were the first to introduce wine to Ireland, most likely of Greek origin, with wine-stained pottery found in archaeological sites dating to 500 BC.

There are records of attempts to cultivate the vine for wine production, such as in the 5th century, when monks at the (later Cistercian) monastery in County Kilkenny planted a vineyard, with a number of other monastic communities following and also producing wine.

In his Ecclesiastical History of the English People written in AD 731, Bede describes Ireland as not having "any want of vines", however this was later contradicted by Gerald of Wales in the 12th century who said that Ireland had never had any vines, although he noted the abundance of imported wine and identified Poitou as a major exporter of wine to Ireland.

== Grape Varieties ==
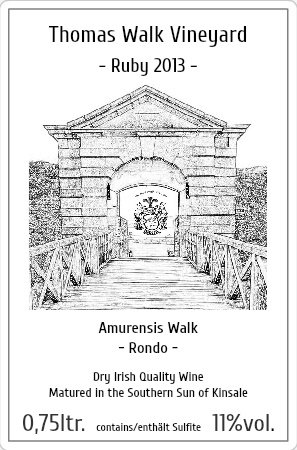
Rondo was first planted commercially by Thomas Walk Vineyards in Kinsale during the 1980s

Grape varieties most suitable to the Irish climate include red and white grapes such as Rondo and Madeleine Angevine, respectively.

== Berry wines ==
In addition to grapes, berries, notably strawberries, raspberries, and blackberries, are also used to produce wines in Ireland.

== See also ==
- Winemaking
- Beer in Ireland
- Cider in Ireland
- Agriculture in Ireland
- Irish cuisine
- British wine
- Danish wine
