= Climate change in Denmark =

Climate change affects various industries and environments in Denmark.

== Greenhouse gas emissions ==
Annual greenhouse gas emissions in 2021 amounted to 46.3 million tonnes of carbon dioxide equivalent in 2021.

== Impacts ==
Summer weather would become more extreme.

== Policies ==
=== Climate Act ===
The Climate Act is a law in Denmark that was passed on June 18, 2020 by the Parliament. It will ensure that Denmark reduces greenhouse gas emissions by 70 percent by 2030 compared to 1990 and that the country is climate neutral by 2050. It establishes a process with annual follow-ups of climate work.

The law was supported by all parties in the Folketing at the time except for the Liberal Alliance and the New Right. That is, it was supported by the Social Democrats, Venstre, the Danish People's Party, the Danish Social Liberal Party, the Green Left, the Red–Green Alliance, the Conservative People's Party and The Alternative.

== Society and culture ==
The television series, Families Like Ours, depicted people fleeing Denmark as climate refugees, and was praised for raising awareness of climate refugees, but was criticised for being an unrealistic depiction and ignoring the treatment of refugees in Denmark.

== See also ==
- Biofuel in Sweden
- Climate change in Norway
- Climate change in Sweden
- Climate change in Greenland
- Regional effects of global warming
- List of countries by greenhouse gas emissions per capita
- Plug-in electric vehicles in Denmark
