= Quality wines produced in specified regions =

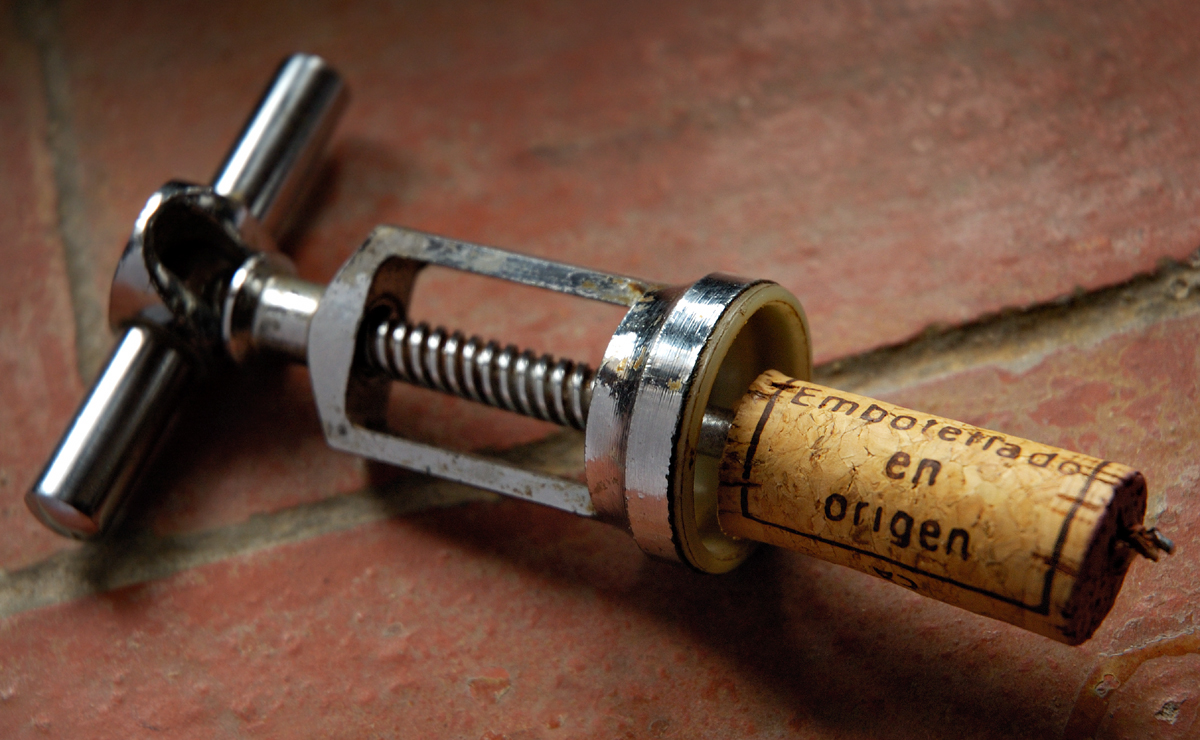
"Bottled at origin" printed in Spanish on a QWpsr cork

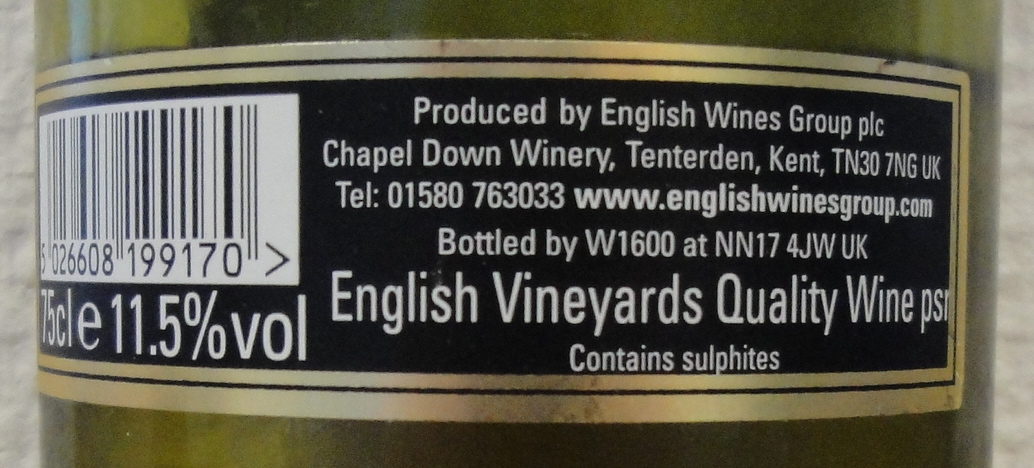
A label indicating an English wine to be a quality wine psr

Quality wines produced in specified regions (often abbreviated to quality wines psr, QWpsr or simply "quality wines") is a quality indicator used within European Union wine regulations. The QWpsr category identifies wines with protected geographical indications and protected designations of origin. The European Union regulates and defines the status of "quality wines" according to production method, management, and geographical location. Its original, fundamental role is in differentiating quality wines from table wines, broadly in line with the system traditionally employed by the French government, amended to account for the preferences and methodology of Italian, German, and other growers in the EU.

== History ==
In 1962, shortly after the Treaty of Rome created the European Economic Community (EEC, or "Common Market") a set of rules were drawn up in which the normal common organisation of the market for a type of product – normally limited to a pricing system, rules on intervention and a system for trade with third-party countries – was extended in several areas in order to accommodate the diverse interests of wine production within individual member states. The wine sector required regulation of more technical aspects, such as the development of wine-growing potential, wine production techniques, oenological practices and processes, rules on designation and presentation, rules governing the movement and release for consumption of wine products, protection of designations of origin, and so on.

At the time the EEC had only six members, four of which were major wine producers; France, Germany, Italy and Luxembourg. The French initiated Community recognition of their principles which differentiated between "quality wines" and "table wines" in order to standardise the marketing of exported wine. Germany and Luxembourg in particular objected to any barriers to the development of their wine industry, which was geared towards the production of wines with a readily available outlet, nor did they wish to change the practice of chaptalisation (the enrichment of wine by adding sugar) which was foreign to many parts of France and forbidden in Italy. French production was highly regulated, where Italians were proud of the free commercialisation of their wines. Where plantation was strictly regulated in some states, it was practically uncontrolled in others.

The QWpsr classification surmounted these problems, dictating specific treatment for 'quality wines', excluding them from classic market management mechanisms such as distillation and storage, while requiring stricter discipline for production and control. Early agreements respected the broad outlines of French national legislation and were also acceptable to Italy. Whereas many guiding principles (including the maintenance of traditional practices and distinguishing between categories of wines) continue to apply without any fundamental changes, many, like freedom of plantation and non-application of intervention measures to quality wines, have gradually been amended. At one point, new plantings were banned to prevent over-production, while the same problem (the infamous "wine lakes" of the last few decades) has led to widespread distillation of quality wines being permitted in years of surplus production, known as "crisis distillation". Today, with domestic demand falling and a boom in sales of New World wine, European growers are seeing increasing amounts of quality wines destined to become ethanol and other biofuels.

== Rules and regulations ==
Quality wines legislation does not specify exactly which wines should be subject to its rules and member states are permitted to regulate their own production in order to preserve traditional practices. In fact the very concept of QWpsr differs between northern and southern Europe; countries like Germany are regulated by quality first and little importance is given to geographical location, while other growers are regulated by geographical considerations first, as is the case with the Spanish denominación de origen regulations. As a consequence, where German wines are automatically classified as QWpsr, French, Italian and Spanish wines only attain that status after being officially approved.

The current QWpsr regulations, last modified in 2000, stipulate the following areas in which member states must make specific provisions:

- lists of suitable grape varieties
- details of required wine-growing methods
- the regulation of enrichment and sweetening practices
- stipulation of a minimum natural alcoholic strength
- maximum yield by hectare
- analysis of wines and assessment of organoleptic characteristics
- ensuring that grape production, wine making and development are carried out within the specified region
- the circumstances under which quality wine may be downgraded to table wine status.

== List of national QWpsr designations ==
The following national levels of wine classification correspond to QWpsr. Many EU countries have more than one QWpsr level, and in such cases, there is typically a national hierarchy between them, although they all follow the same EU rules.

Country	National classification corresponding to QWpsr	
Country	Higher level	Lower level
Austria	Prädikatswein (Qualitätswein besonderer Reife und Leseart)	Qualitätswein, Districtus Austriae Controllatus
Belgium	Gecontroleerde oorsprongsbenaming (Dutch), Appellation d’origine contrôlée (French)	
Bulgaria	Гарантирано и контролирано наименование за произход (ГКНП), "Guaranteed and controlled designation of origin" (GKaNP)	Гарантирано наименование за произход (ГНП), "Guaranteed designation of origin" (GNP)
Cyprus	Οίνος Ελεγχόμενης Ονομασίας Προέλευσης (ΟΕΟΠ), "Controlled Designation of Origin" (OEOP)	
Czech Republic	Jakostní víno s přívlastkem	Jakostní víno
France	Appellation d'origine contrôlée (AOC)	None after 2011 vintage, formerly Appellation d'origine vin délimité de qualité supérieure (AOVDQS or VDQS)
Germany	Prädikatswein (formerly Qualitätswein mit Prädikat, QmP)	Qualitätswein (Qualitätswein besonderer Anbaugebiete, QbA)
Greece	Ονομασία Προέλευσης Ανωτέρας Ποιότητας (ΟΠΑΠ), "Appellation of Origin of Superior Quality" (OPAP)	Ονομασία Προέλευσης Ελεγχόμενη (ΟΠΕ), "Controlled Appellation of Origin" (OPE)
Hungary	Minőségi bor, "Quality wine"	Védett eredetű bor, "Wine with protected origin"
Italy	Denominazione di origine controllata e garantita (D.O.C.G.), may also be written in German as Kontrollierte und garantierte Ursprungsbezeichnung on wines from Bolzano	Denominazione di origine controllata (D.O.C.), may also be written in German as Kontrollierte Ursprungsbezeichnung on wines from Bolzano
Luxembourg	Marque nationale + Appellation d'origine (A.O.)	
Malta	Denominazzjoni ta' Origini Kontrollata (D.O.K.)	
Portugal	Denominação de Origem Controlada (D.O.C.)	Indicação de proveniência regulamentada (I.P.R.), Vinho Regional (V.R.)
Romania	Vin cu denumire de origine controlată (D.O.C.)	
Slovakia	Akostné víno s prívlastkom	Akostné víno
Slovenia	Kakovostno peneče vino z zaščitenim geografskim poreklom	Vrhunsko peneče vino z zaščitenim geografskim poreklom
Spain	Denominación de origen calificada (DOCa), Denominació d'Origen Qualificada (DOQ), Vino de pago	Denominación de origen (DO), Denominació d'Origen (DO), Denominación de Orixe (DO), Jatorrizko Deitura (JD), Vino de calidad

== Similar denominations in non-EU countries ==
- Algeria: Appellation d'origine garantie (AOG)
- Argentina: Denominación de Origen Controlada (DOC) and Indicación Geográfica (IG)
- Australia: Geographical Indication (GI)
- Brazil: Denominação de Origem (DO) and Indicação de Procedência (IP)
- Canada: Vintners Quality Alliance (VQA)
- Chile: Denominación de Origen de Región Vitícola
- Mercosur: Denominación de Origen Reconocida and Indicación Geográfica Reconocida
- Morocco: Appellation d'origine contrôlée (AOC) and Appellation d'origine garantie (AOG)
- New Zealand: Geographical Indication (GI)
- San Marino: Identificazione d'Origine (IO)
- South Africa: Wine of Origin (W.O.)
- Switzerland: Appellation d'origine contrôlée (AOC)
- Tunisia: Appellation d'origine contrôlée (AOC)
- United Kingdom: Quality wine (English vineyard quality wine psr, Welsh vineyard quality wine psr)
- United States: American Viticultural Area (AVA)

== See also ==
- Protected designation of origin – EU legislation against non-genuine produce
- Traditional food
