= Plug-in electric vehicles in Denmark =

As of September 2022

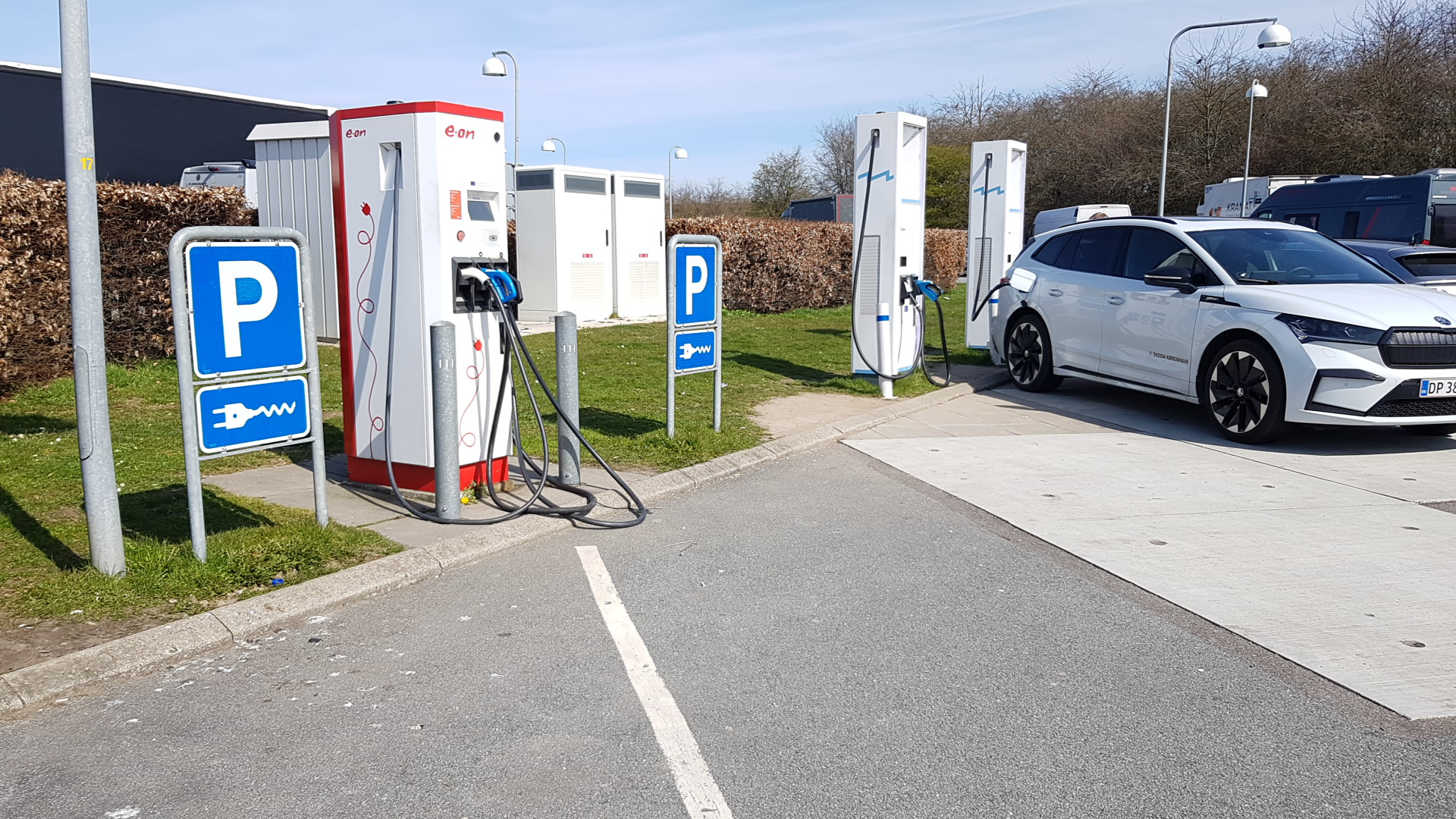
Karlslunde øst charging stations in Denmark

, there were 97,121 battery electric vehicles and 97,071 plug-in hybrid vehicles registered in Denmark, together equivalent to about 7% of all vehicles in the country. As of August 2022, 19.1% of all new cars sold in Denmark were fully electric, and 18.0% were plug-in hybrid.

In 2022, Denmark was ranked by Forbes as the third most EV-friendly country in the world.

== History ==
In the late 1980s to early 1990s, a few thousand of the small, one-person and locally produced Ellert were sold in Denmark, but relatively few remain today. In the following decade, very few electric cars were sold in Denmark, but a clear increase began around 2010.

Up to and including 2015, electric cars had been exempt from vehicle registration tax, but it was decided that this would be gradually outphased: In 2016, the vehicle registration tax for electric cars was placed at 20% of the normal rate, in 2017 it was planned to increase to 40% and within five years it would become the full rate. This had a large effect on the sale, which drastically fell in 2016–17. As a consequence, it was decided that the increase in vehicle registration tax for electric vehicles would be delayed, being capped at 20% of the normal rate in 2017–19, then gradually increasing until 2023 where it would become the full rate. A new fund for fuel cell vehicles was also started.

In 2020, a new taxation deal was reached, valid for all cars from 2021 to 2030. Its rates depend heavily on the CO_{2}-emission of the car. This means that vehicle registration tax for all-electric cars (BEVs) that cost less than 510,000 DKK (€68,500) will remain very low with a slower than initially planned gradual increase to normal levels, most plug-in hybrids (PHEVs) will increase from 2021 but remain lower than gasoline and diesel cars, and diesel cars will increase. The goal of this plan is to have at least 775,000 electric cars (BEV or PHEV) by 2030. Combined with other plans, it is the goal to have at least 1 million zero-emission or low-emission cars by 2030 and that no new gasoline or diesel cars will be sold in the country from that year.

== Statistics ==
Total of new battery electric vehicles registered per year
Year	2015	2016	2017	2018	2019	2020	2021
Total new BEV registrations	4329	1316	698	1545	5524	14219	24917
BEV % of total new registrations	2.1%	0.6%	0.3%	0.7%	2.4%	7.1%	13.4%
Total new PHEV registrations	–	–	620	3127	3885	18235	40464
PHEV % of total new registrations	–	–	0.3%	1.4%	1.7%	9.2%	21.8%

As of June 2022, 60% of all electric vehicles sold in Denmark were used.

In 2015, Denmark was the second largest European market for light-duty, plug-in commercial vehicles or utility vans, with over 2,600 plug-in vans sold that year, representing 8.5% of all vans sold. Most vans were plug-in hybrids, accounting for almost all EU plug-in van sales.

As of June 2022, the Škoda Enyaq was the best-selling electric car in Denmark.

== Government policy ==
As of 2022, Denmark charges a registration tax of 40% for fully electric vehicles, and 50% for plug-in hybrid vehicles.

== Charging stations ==
As of December 2021, there were 4,850 public charging stations in Denmark.

== Public transportation ==
In 2020, the municipalities of Copenhagen, Aarhus, Odense, Aalborg, Vejle and Frederiksberg announced plans to end purchases of non-electric buses by the end of the year.

== By region ==
=== Hovedstaden ===
As of December 2021, 53% of new cars sold in the Capital Region of Denmark were electric or plug-in hybrid.

As of February 2022, there were 1,240 public charging stations in Copenhagen.

=== Midtjylland ===
As of August 2021, 1.5% of vehicles in Aarhus were electric.

=== Sjælland ===
As of December 2021, 60% of new cars sold in Region Zealand were electric or plug-in hybrid.

=== Syddanmark ===
As of April 2022, there were about 14,000 electric vehicles registered in the Region of Southern Denmark.

As of December 2021, 61% of new cars sold on Funen were electric or plug-in hybrid.
