= Solaris (grape) =

Variety of grape

- Grape (Vitis)
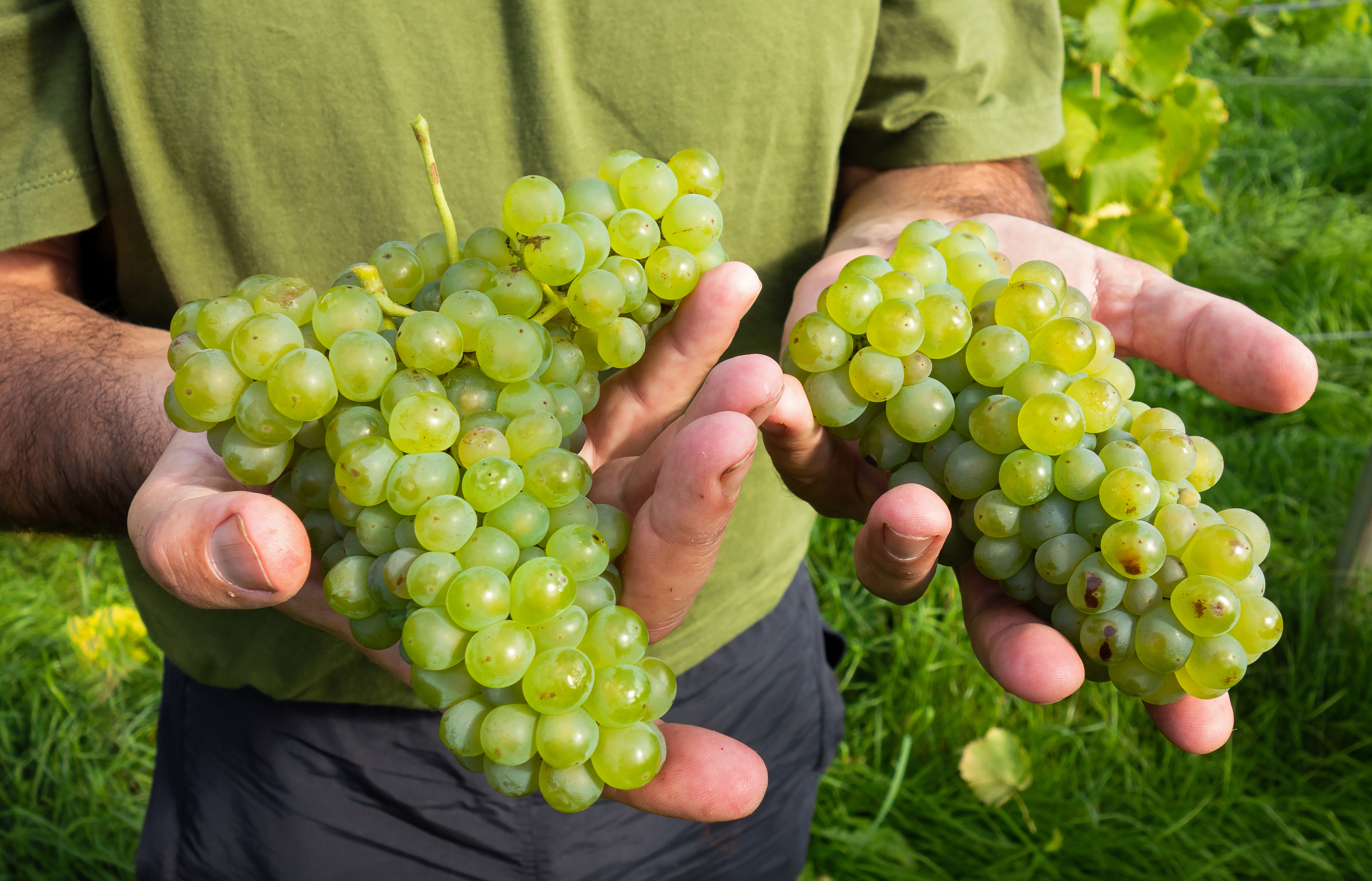
- Solaris grapes harvested in Lysekil, Sweden
- Color of berry skin: Blanc
- Species: Vitis
- Also called: 240-75
- Origin: Freiburg, Germany
- Original pedigree: Merzling x GM 6493
- Pedigree parent 1: Merzling = Seyve-villard 5276 x (Riesling x Pinot gris)
- Pedigree parent 2: GM 6493 = Zarya Severa x Muscat Ottonel
- Notable regions: Germany
- VIVC number: 20340

Solaris is a variety of grape used for white wine. It was created in 1975 at the grape breeding institute in Freiburg, Germany by agricultural scientist Norbert Becker.

== Pedigree ==
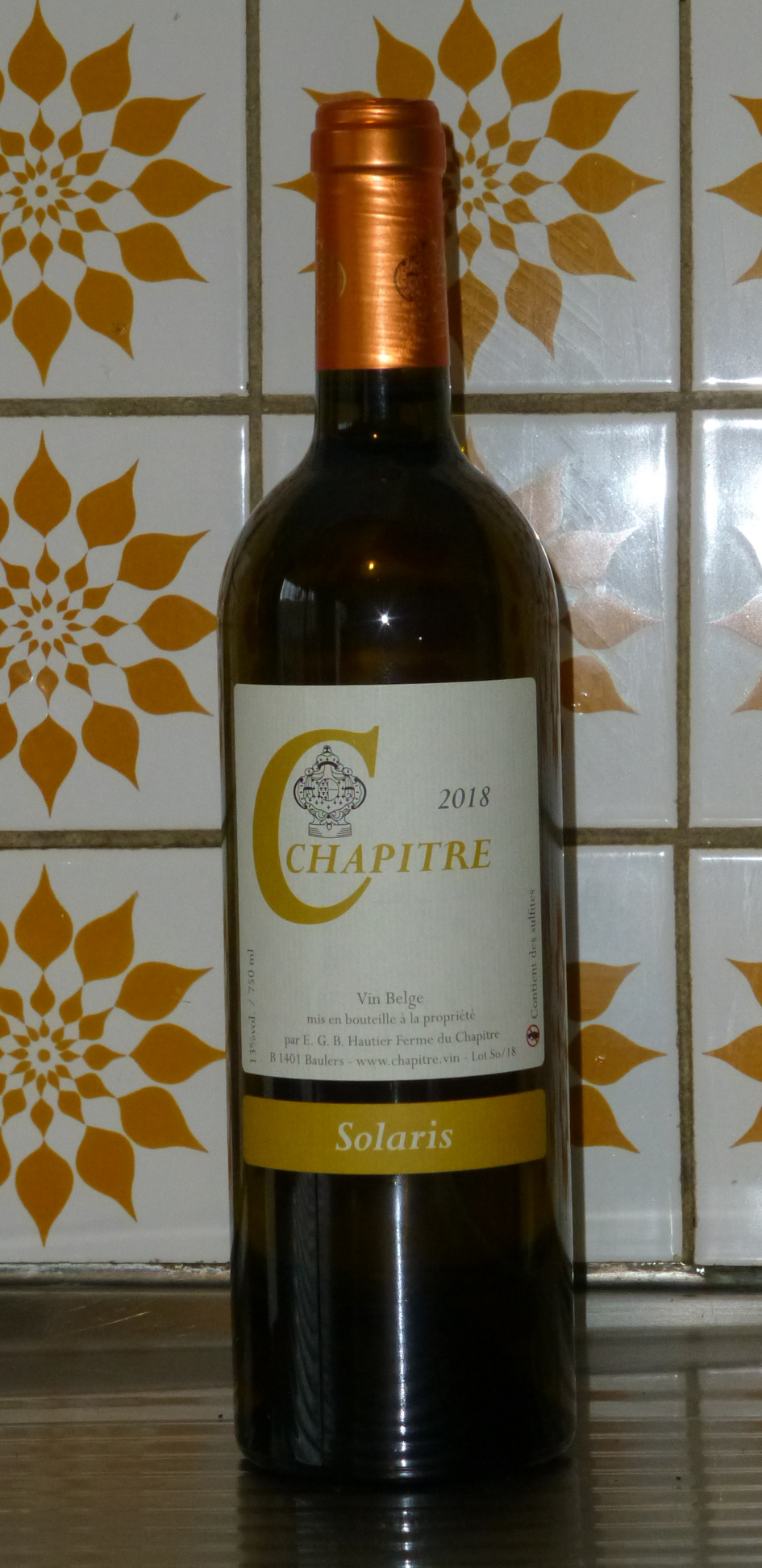
2018 Wine of Belgium with the Solaris grape.

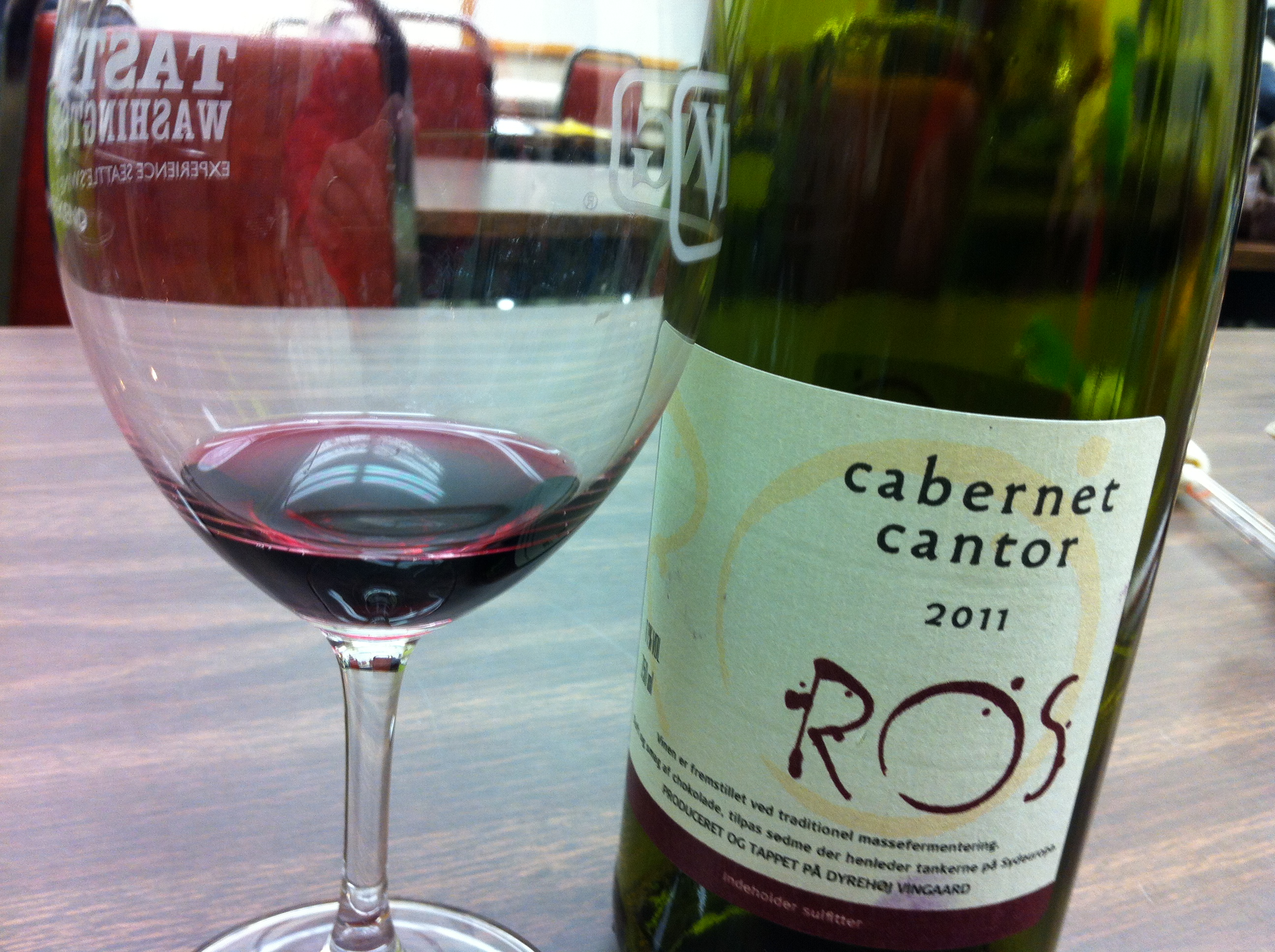
A Danish wine made from Cabernet Cantor, an offspring of Solaris.

Becker created Solaris by crossing the variety Merzling (which is Seyve-villard 5276 x (Riesling x Pinot gris)) as the mother vine with Gm 6493 (which is Zarya Severa x Muscat Ottonel) as the father vine. Gm 6493 was one of several crossings created in Czechoslovakia in 1964 by Professor Vilém Kraus. Kraus offered several of his crosses to Dr. Helmut Becker at the Geisenheim grape breeding institute, where additional work was carried out, and where his plants were given "Gm" serial numbers for Geisenheim. Gm 6493 has previously been erroneously stated to be Saperawi Severni x Muscat Ottonel but is now identified as Zarya Severa x Muscat Ottonel.

Solaris is classified as a Vitis vinifera grape apt to be grown and made wine with by the EU, although it contains traces of hybrid grapes in its pedigree. It was formally listed as a Vitis vinifera cultivar. It received varietal protection in 2001.

Solaris was the product of a programme for breeding disease-resistant grape varieties, and has good resistance against fungal attacks. As it is a hardy variety, it is commonly grown in northern European countries with marginal climate for winemaking, such as Belgium, the Netherlands, England, Denmark, Sweden and Norway. As of 2007, there were 54 hectares (130 acres) of Solaris in Germany, of which 35 hectares (86 acres) were in Baden, where Freiburg is located.

== Properties ==
Solaris is an early ripening variety with good resistance against fungal diseases and frost. It gives wines which have fruity and aromatic aromas with hints of gooseberry, citrus and elderflower with high acidity. It is considered to be suitable for dessert wines, as it ripens to high must weights. In cooler climate, with less sugar content, also as a dry wine suitable for fish, shrimp or chicken.
