= Phoenix (grape) =

Variety of grape

- Grape (Vitis)
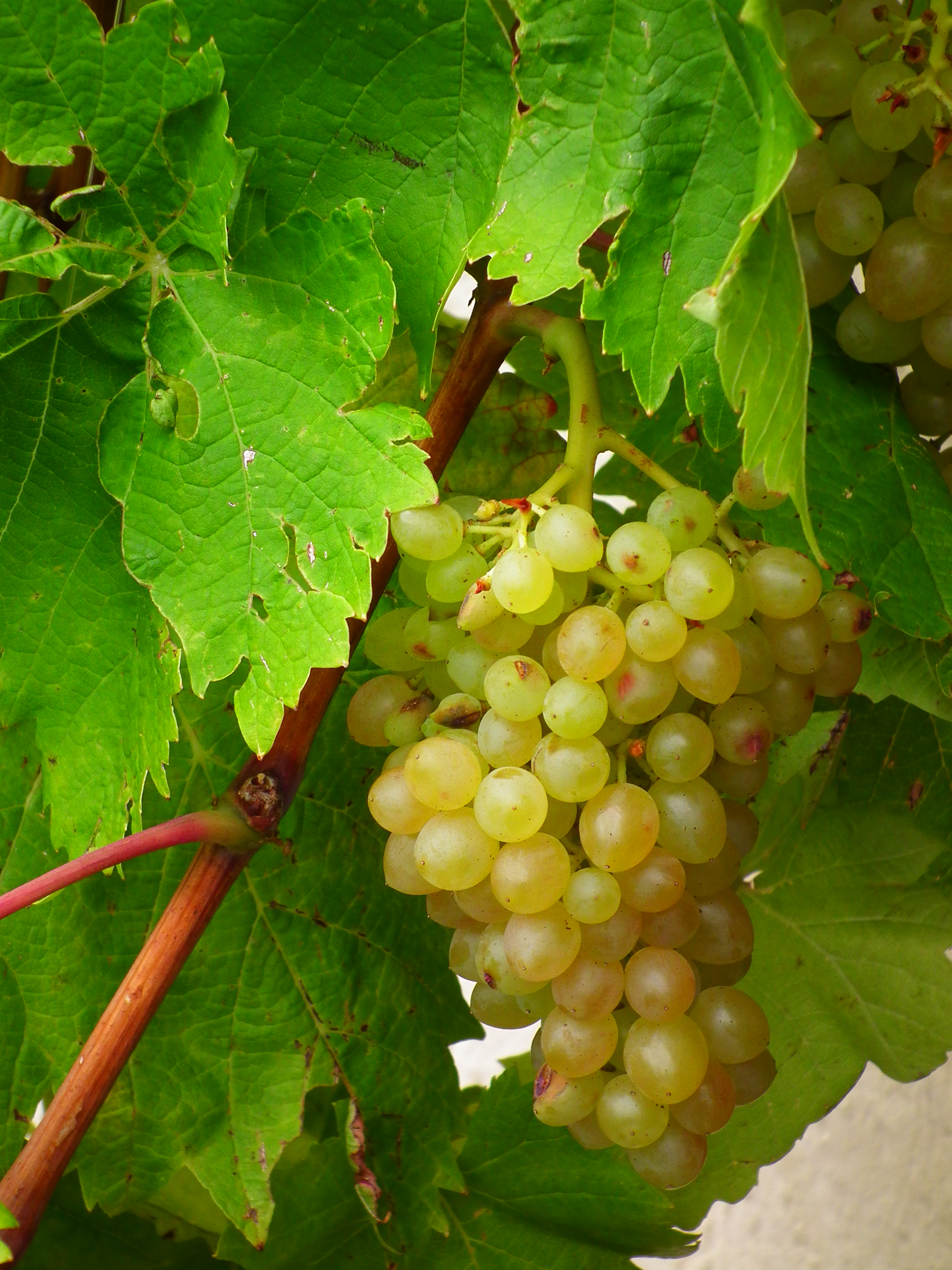
- Species: Vitis vinifera but with some influence of other species in its pedigree
- Also called: See list
- Origin: Germany
- VIVC number: 9224

Phoenix is a white variety of grape of German origin used for winemaking. It was created by Dr. Gerhardt Alleweldt (1927–2005) at the Geilweilerhof Institute for Grape Breeding in Siebeldingen in 1964, by crossing the Vitis vinifera variety Bacchus with the hybrid grape Villard Blanc.

It is grown in small quantities in regions such as Belgium and the UK. At the Royal Horticultural Society's Wisley Garden, Phoenix is used together with the Orion grape to produce a dry white wine.

In Germany in 2008, there were 48 hectares (120 acres) of Phoenix, of which 21 hectares (52 acres) were in Rheinhessen, 14 hectares (35 acres) in Nahe and 9 hectares (22 acres) in the Palatinate.

== Synonyms ==
Phoenix is also known under its breeding code Geilweilerhof GA-49-22 or Gf. GA-49-22.
