= Belgian wine =

Wine making in Belgium

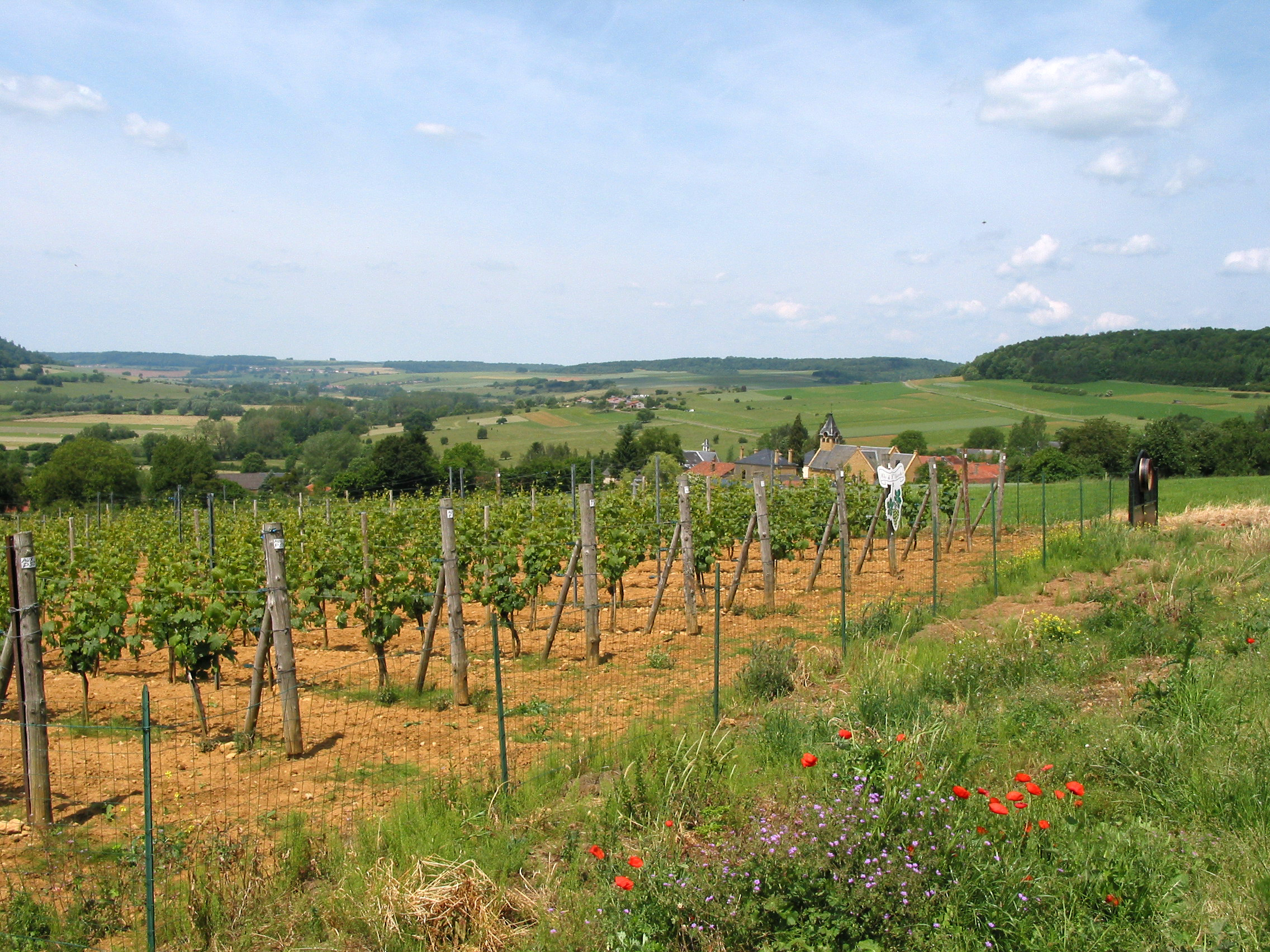
Wine production near Torgny

Belgian wine is produced in several parts of Belgium and production, although still modest at 1,400 hectoliters in 2004, has expanded in recent decades.

== History ==
Belgian wine first appeared in the Middle Ages, around the 9th century. It is unlikely that wine was made in the area now known as Belgium before that, since the climate was not suitable and Gaul was covered with thick forests. However, there are mentions of Paris vineyards in the 4th century. From that time, vine cultivation spread northward and in the 8th century the banks of the Rhine were covered with vineyards. The first attempts at viniculture in Belgium were made around the same time. Moreover, the vineyards were already well established in Amay. The vineyard at Vivegnis, in the north of the province of Liège, was already considered old in the 9th century, as well as the vineyard at Huy, which belonged in part to the Bishop of Liège. The edges of the Meuse River were intensively cultivated because they offered well-exposed hillsides.

In the 14th century, each city had its own vineyard, whether within or outside the city walls. The cities of Tournai, Louvain, Brussels, Bruges, Ghent, Thuin, Hal, Dinant, Namur, Tongres, and Huy, among others, have left signs of their viticultural activities in the form of local place names such as Wijnberg, mount of vines, Wijngaard, Dutch vineyard, Vivegnis and Vinalmont.

The first to cultivate vines in the region were monks, who needed a clean, safe beverage for their celebrations, one that would risk contaminating neither the citizens nor the rainwater catchment; the vine responded to their efforts, and so the first vineyards were the property of abbeys. Some of the more organized abbeys even owned vineyards outside of their districts. Wine grapes were also cultivated by individuals, as well as by seigneurs such as the Dukes of Burgundy, who owned the vineyards at Brussels, Louvain, Aarschot, Namur and Mons.

Climatic conditions in the 15th century presented difficulties for viniculture, with the onset of the Little Ice Age. Some vineyards in favorable microclimates survived until the 17th century.

During this same era, techniques of beer production advanced and, owing to the addition of hops, storage life was prolonged. Beer gained in popularity, and eventually supplanted wine as the most common bacteriologically safe beverage.

The expansion of the Belgian winegrowing area in the late 20th and early 21st century is part of a larger trend of increase in cold-climate winemaking. In many cases, new vineyards have been created in areas previously known for orchards.

== Wine regions ==
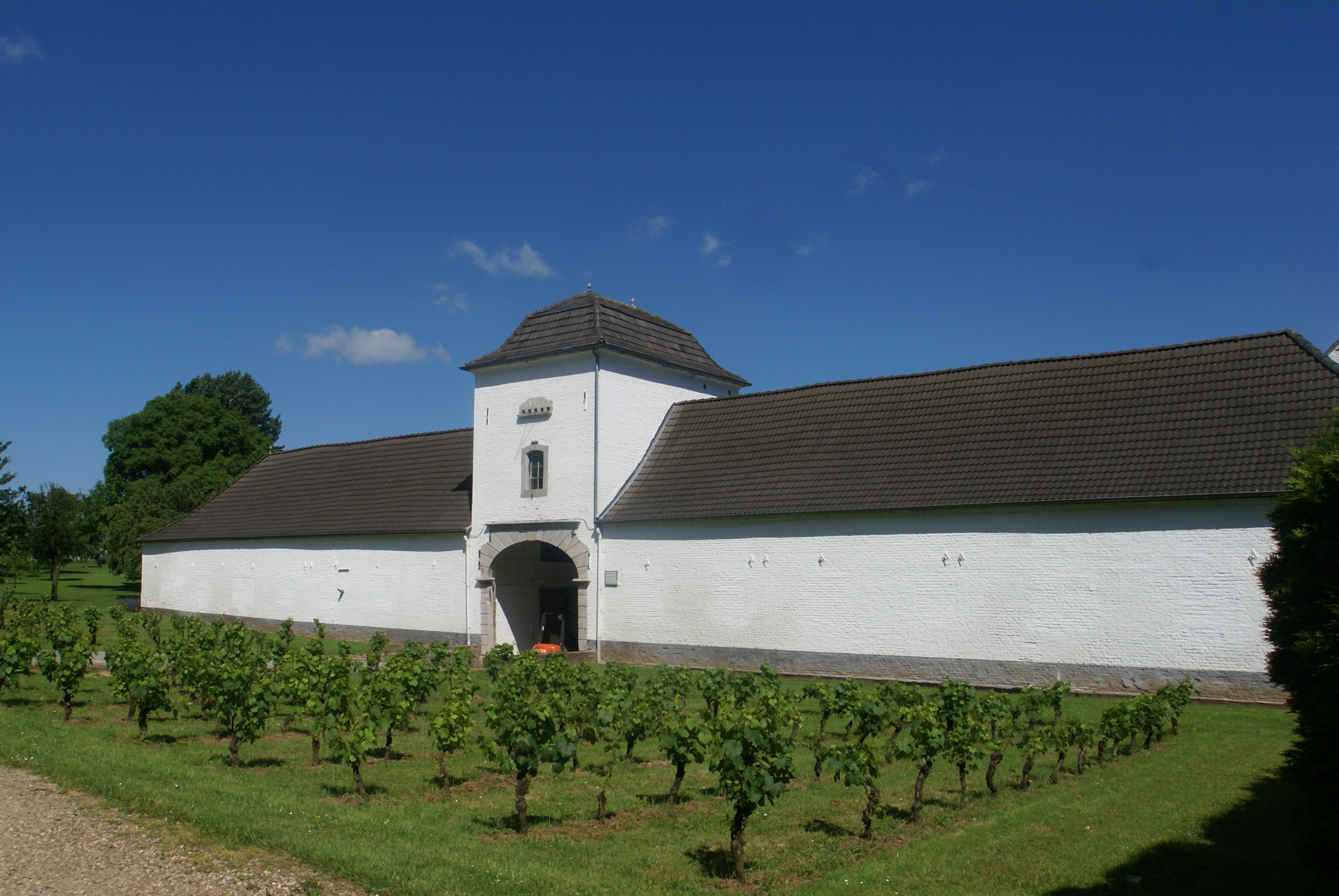
Wijnkasteel Genoels-Elderen in AOC Haspengouw

Wine production occurs in both Wallonia and Flanders. As French is one of Belgium's official languages, the official terms used for Belgian wine regions are the same as those for French wine. Belgium has five officially demarcated Appellations d'origine contrôlées (AOCs), four in Flanders and one in Wallonia, and two Vin de pays regions. Hageland, situated in Flemish Brabant close to Leuven, was the first AOC was created, in 1997. AOC Haspengouw (Hesbaye) followed in 2000, located in Limburg, close to the border with Netherlands, and home to Belgium's most famous "château" and largest wine producer, Wijnkasteel Genoels-Elderen. AOC Heuvelland followed in 2005. In Dutch, these three Flemish AOCs are written as Hagelandse wijn, Haspengouwse wijn and Heuvellandse wijn, respectively, and the official term corresponding to the French term AOC is Gecontroleerde oorsprongsbenaming. There is also an AOC for quality sparkling wine from Flanders, Vlaamse mousserende kwaliteitswijn, created in 2005.

The first Wallonian AOC, Côtes de Sambre et Meuse, was created in 2004, and is situated between the rivers Sambre and Meuse, in the vicinity of Liège.

The two Vin de Pays (country wine) regions cover Flanders and Wallonia, respectively. The Flemish country wine is simply designated Vlaamse landwijn, while the Wallonian country wine carries the slightly more fanciful name Vin de pays des Jardins de Wallonie.

== Wine styles ==
Wines of different styles are produced, but around 90 percent of the production is white wines. Those that receive the most attention are white wines produced from Chardonnay grapes, produced in a style somewhat reminiscent of a white Burgundy wine. While both unoaked ("Chablis-style") and oaked ("Côte de Beaune-style") Chardonnay wines are produced, the oaked examples have been more successful with wine critics.

== Grape varieties ==
For AOC Hageland, the following grape varieties are authorised:

- White grapes: Auxerrois, Bacchus, Chardonnay, Müller-Thurgau, Kerner, Optima, Ortega, Pinot blanc, Pinot gris, Riesling, Siegerrebe, Würzer.
- Red grapes: Dornfelder, Pinot Meunier, Pinot noir.

For AOC Côtes de Sambre et Meuse, the following grape varieties are authorised:

- White grapes: Auxerrois, Bronner, Chardonnay, Chasselas, Chenin, Johanniter, Madeleine Angevine, Merzling, Müller-Thurgau (or Rivaner), Muscat, Ortega, Pinot blanc, Pinot gris, Riesling, Seibel, Sieger, Traminer (or Gewürztraminer).
- Red grapes: Gamay, Merlot, Pinot noir, Pinot noir précoce, Regent.

For Flemish sparkling wine:

- White grapes: Auxerrois, Chardonnay, Pinot blanc, Pinot gris, Riesling.
- Red grapes: Pinot Meunier, Pinot noir.

Other grapes grown in Belgium include: Muscat bleu, Solaris.

== Wine competition ==
The country counts few wine competitions. But only the International Wine Contest of Monde Selection received the patronage of the O.I.V.

== See also ==
- Winemaking
- Agriculture in Belgium
