= St. Laurent (grape) =

Variety of grape

- Grape (Vitis)
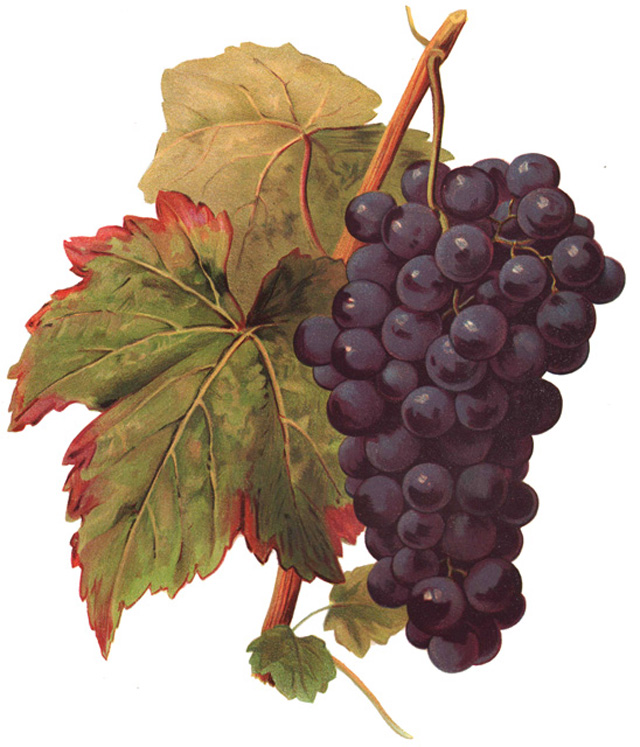
- St. Laurent in Viala & Vermorel
- Color of berry skin: Noir
- Species: Vitis vinifera
- Also called: see list
- Origin: Austria
- VIVC number: 10470

St. Laurent (also Saint Laurent, or Sankt Laurent in German) is a highly aromatic dark-skinned wine grape variety grown in cool climate regions of central Europe, mainly Austria and the Czech Republic. Its origin is uncertain, but the long-held belief that it is related to Pinot noir has been confirmed by DNA analysis, which shows it is an offspring of Pinot noir and a second parent, possibly Savagnin.

St. Laurent is the second-most widely planted red grape variety in the Czech Republic, grown in all wine subregions in both Moravia and Bohemia. It comprises approximately 6% of total vineyards, or 1,053 hectares (2,600 acres).

In Austria, St. Laurent is the third most popular red grape variety and is primarily grown in Lower Austria and Burgenland. In 2008, Austrian plantations stood at 794 hectares (1,960 acres), and have expanded in the 2000s as a part of general red wine trend in Austria, after having declined somewhat during the 1990s.

== Offspring ==
- Zweigelt was created in 1922 by Fritz Zweigelt by crossing Blaufränkisch and St. Laurent.
- André was bred in 1960 by J. Horák by crossing St. Laurent and Blaufränkisch, and entered into the Czech State Register of Grape Varieties in 1980.
- Neronet is (St. Laurent × Blauer Portugieser) × (Alicante Bouschet × Cabernet Sauvignon), where Alicante Bouschet × Cabernet Sauvignon was given the name Alibernet.
- Rondo is Zarya Severa × St. Laurent. It was initially labelled Gm 6494-5, as it was number 5 in a series of similar crosses. Other members of the Gm 6494 population were used to create Bronner, Baron, Cabernet Carbon, Prior and Souvignier gris.

== Synonyms ==
St. Laurent is known under the following synonyms: Blauer Saint Laurent, Chvartser, Laourentstraoube, Laurenzitraube, Laurenztraube, Lorentstraube, Lorenztraube, Lovrenac Crni, Lovrijenac, Lovrijenac Crni, Saint Laurent noir, Saint Lorentz, Sankt Laurent, Sankt Lorenztraube, Sant Lorentz, Schwarzer, Schwarzer Lorenztraube, Sent Laourent, Sent Lovrenka, Sentlovrenka, Shentlovrenka, Shvartser, St. Laurent, Svati Vavrinetz, Svatovavřinecké, Svatovavrinetske, Svatovavrinetzke, Svätovavrinecké, Svaty Vavrinec, Szent Lőrinc, Szent Lőrinczi, Szent Loerine, Szentlőrinc, Vavrinak
