= Bianca (grape) =

Variety of grape

- Grape (Vitis)
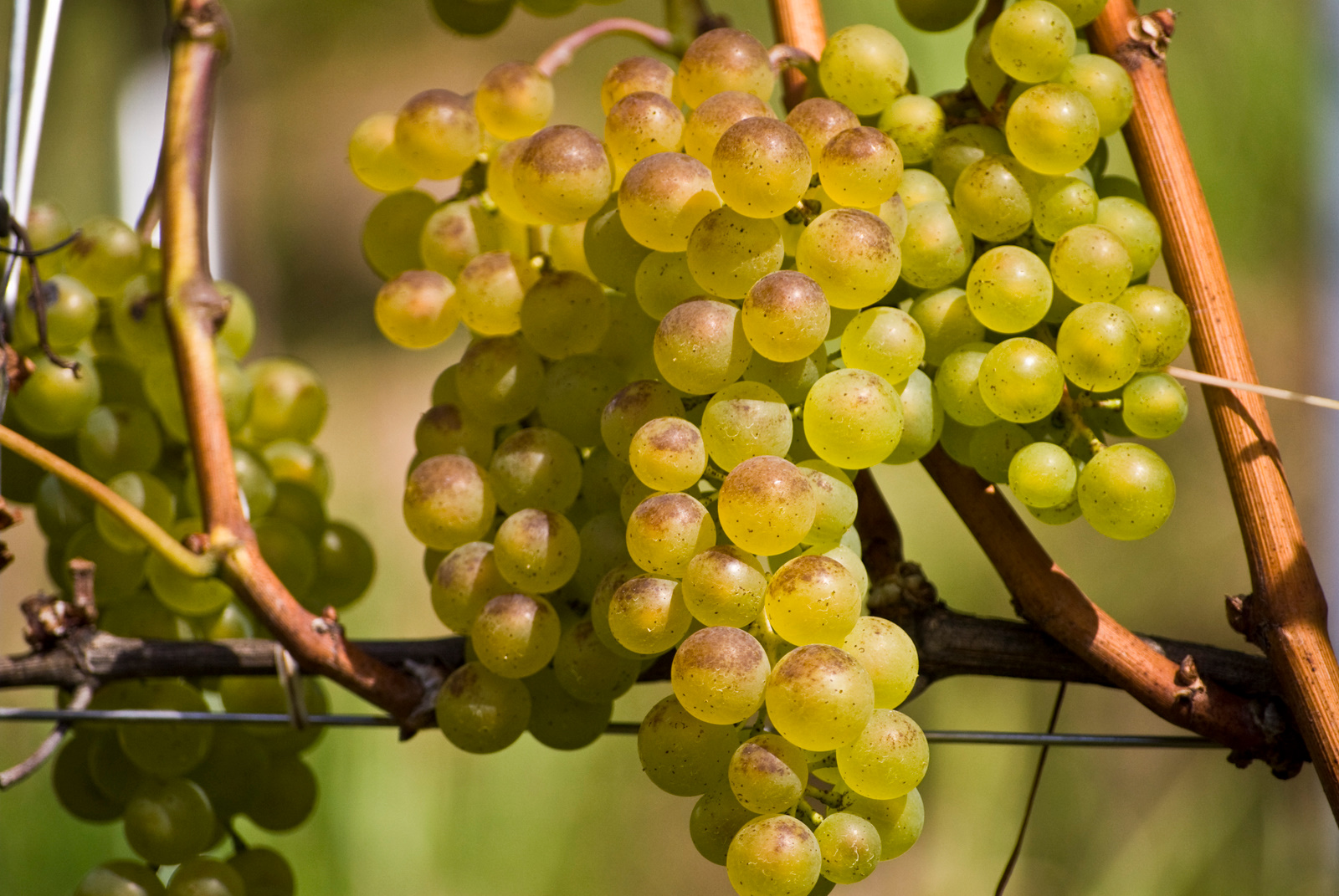
- Bianca grapes ripening on the vine
- Species: Vitis vinifera
- VIVC number: 1321

Bianca is a white Hungarian wine grape variety that was developed in 1963 in the Eger wine region of northeast Hungary. The grape is a hybrid crossing of Bouvier and Eger 2 (an offspring of Villard blanc). The grape was officially register for use in wine production in 1982 and today is used to make a wide assortment of wines from dry varietals to sweet dessert wines. Bianca is growing in popularity among organic vineyards due to its natural high resistance to many fungal diseases that affect grapevines.

== History ==
Bianca was developed in 1963 at the Kölyuktetö viticultural research facility in Eger. Viticulturists László Bereznai and József Csizmazia crossed the Slovenia wine grape Bouvier (believed to be an offspring of the Pinot grape) with Eger 2 (a selfling of Villard blanc). The grape was originally named Egri Csillagok 40 meaning "star of Eger" with 40 being a breeding code but was officially registered under the name Bianca when it was authorized for wine production in 1982.

In Serbia, Bianca was crossed with Petra to create two different pink-berried wine grape varieties, Bačka and Rubinka, which have been authorized for use in wine production since 2002.

== Viticulture ==
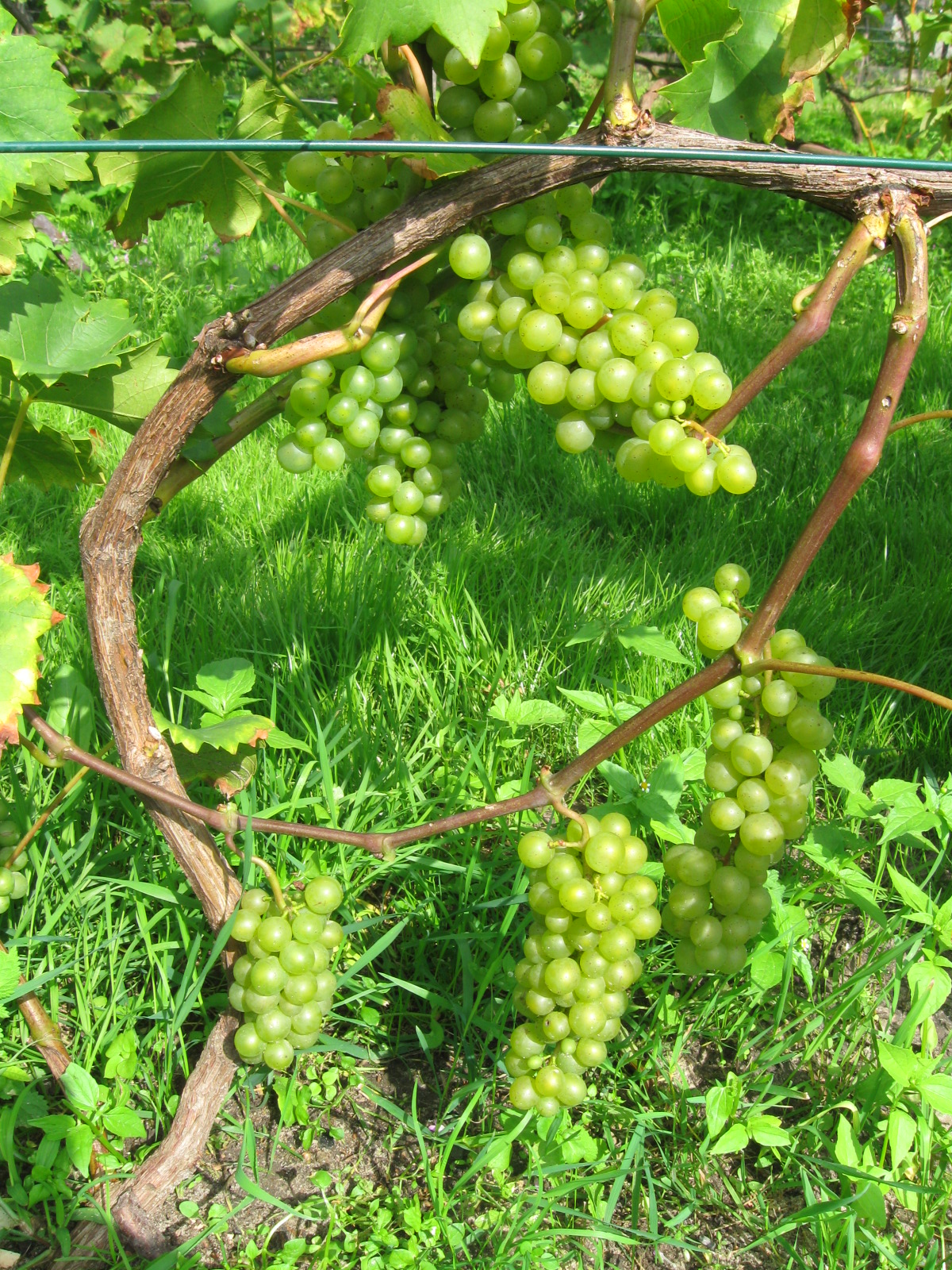
Bianca grapes pre-veraison.

Bianca is an early to mid budding grape variety that is known for its winter hardiness and resistance to the viticultural hazards of spring time frost damage. The vine is an early ripening variety which makes suitable for cultivation in wine regions with harsh continental climates and short growing seasons.

The grape clusters of Bianca tend to be medium-sized to very large but the berries tend always be small in size with a noticeable waxy coating. The grapevine has strong resistance to many fungal diseases that can infect grapevines which has contributed to Bianca's popularity among organic vine growers. The vine can also be very vigorous, producing a large leafy canopy that needs to be kept in check with canopy management techniques, and high yielding. Among the viticultural hazards that Bianca is susceptible to is coulure which can be brought about due to poor weather conditions during flowering.

== Wine regions ==
As of 2012, there were 1,280 hectares (3,200 acres) of Bianca planted in Hungary, the vast majority in the Kunság region where there 1,137 hectares (2,810 acres) in 2012. Outside of Hungary some planting of the grape can be found in the Russian wine regions of Krasnodar Krai where there 2,731 hectares (6,750 acres) in cultivation in 2009. In Moldova, there were 15 hectares (37 acres) of Bianca being used in wine production as of 2012.

== Styles ==
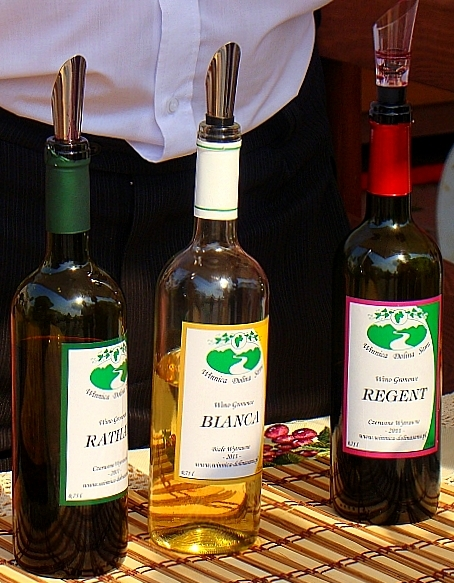
Varietal wine made from Bianca (center).

According to Master of Wine Jancis Robinson, Bianca tends to produce relatively neutral tasting wines that have moderate alcohol levels and can have some floral aromatics. The styles of wines made from Bianca are highly influenced by harvest time decisions with earlier harvested grapes tending to produce wines with what Robinson describes as more "exotic" aromas. In the winery, the wine made from Bianca is highly prone to oxidation with care needing to be taken to avoid the development of wine faults.

== Synonyms ==
Over the years, Bianca has been known under a variety of synonyms including: Biahka, Bianka, EC 40, ECS 40, Egri Csillagok 40 and May Rot.
