= Orion (grape) =

Variety of grape

- Grape (Vitis)
- Species: Hybrid grape
- Also called: Geilweilerhof GA-58-30
- Origin: Germany
- VIVC number: 8802

Orion is a white wine grape variety of German origin. It was created by Dr. Gerhardt Alleweldt (1927-2005) at the Geilweilerhof Institute for Grape Breeding in Siebeldingen in 1964, by crossing the Vitis vinifera variety Optima with the hybrid grape Villard Blanc. Therefore, Orion is itself a hybrid grape (interspecific crossing) rather than a pure Vitis vinifera.

Orion derives its name from the mythological hunter Orion, which gave the constellation Orion its name. The grape variety is also known under the synonyms Geilweilerhof GA-58-30 and Gf. GA-58-30.

Orion is grown in small quantities in the UK at the Royal Horticultural Society's Wisley Garden, where it is used together with the Phoenix hybrid grape to produce a dry white wine.
