= German wine =

Wine making in Germany

The German wine regions

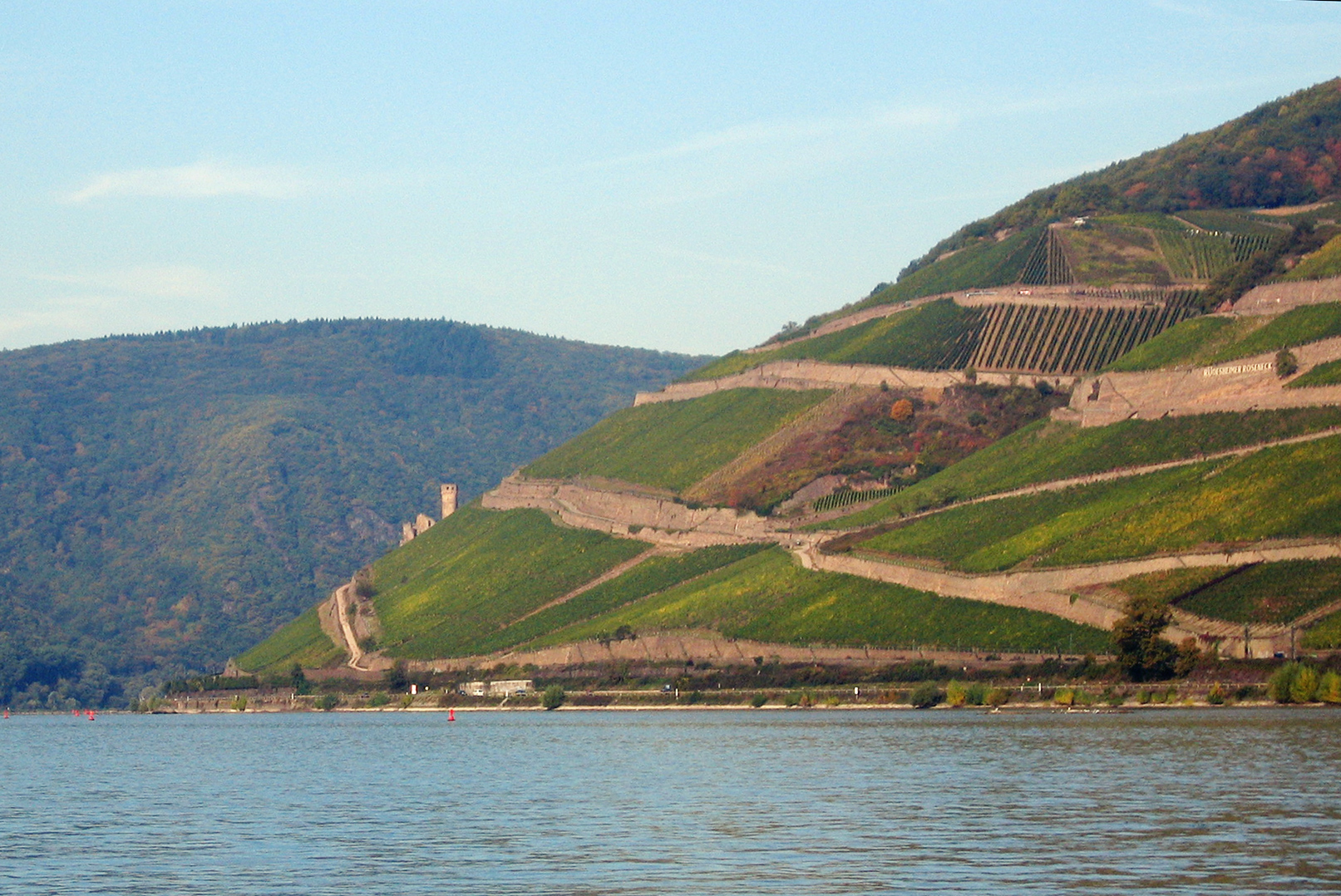
Steep vineyards on Rüdesheimer Berg overlooking the river Rhine

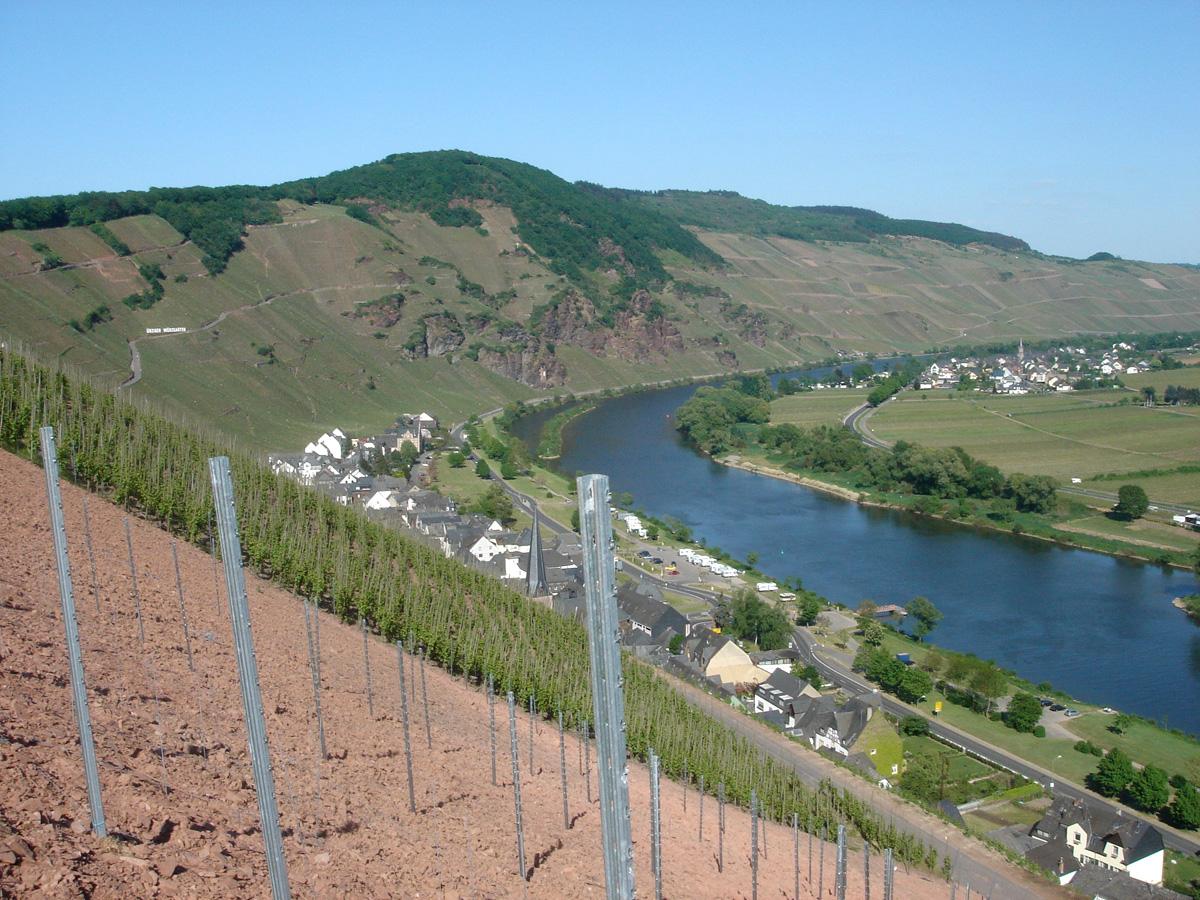
Steep vineyards along the Moselle, close to the village Ürzig

German wine is primarily produced in the west of Germany, along the river Rhine and its tributaries, with the oldest plantations going back to the Celts and Roman eras. Approximately 60 percent of German wine is produced in the state of Rhineland-Palatinate, where 6 of the 13 regions (Anbaugebiete) for quality wine are situated. Germany has about 104,000 hectares (252,000 acres or 1,030 square kilometers) of vineyard, which is around one tenth of the vineyard surface in Spain, France or Italy. The total wine production is usually around 10 million hectoliters annually, corresponding to 1.3 billion bottles, which places Germany as the ninth-largest wine-producing country and seventh by export market share in the world. White wine accounts for almost two thirds of the total production.

Some consumers on the export markets associate Germany with the world's most elegant and aromatically pure white wines. Among enthusiasts, Germany's reputation is primarily based on wines made from the Riesling grape variety, which at its best is used for aromatic, fruity and elegant white wines that range from very crisp and dry to well-balanced, sweet and of enormous aromatic concentration. While primarily a white wine country, red wine production surged in the 1990s and early 2000s, primarily fuelled by domestic demand, and the proportion of the German vineyards devoted to the cultivation of dark-skinned grape varieties has now stabilized at slightly more than a third of the total surface. For the red wines, Spätburgunder, the domestic name for Pinot noir, is in the lead.

== Wine styles ==
Germany produces wines in many styles: dry, semi-sweet and sweet white wines, rosé wines, red wines and sparkling wines, called Sekt. (The only wine style not commonly produced is fortified wine.) Due to the northerly location of the German vineyards, the country has produced wines quite unlike any others in Europe, many of outstanding quality. Between the 1950s and the 1980s German wine was known abroad for cheap, sweet or semi-sweet, low-quality mass-produced wines such as Liebfraumilch.

The wines have historically been predominantly white, and the finest made from Riesling. Many wines have been sweet and low in alcohol, light and unoaked. Historically many of the wines (other than late harvest wines) were probably dry (trocken), as techniques to stop fermentation did not exist. Recently much more German white wine is being made in the dry style again. Much of the wine sold in Germany is dry, especially in restaurants. However most exports are still of sweet wines, particularly to the traditional export markets such as the United States, the Netherlands and Great Britain, which are the leading export markets both in terms of volume and value.

Red wine has always been hard to produce in the German climate, and in the past was usually light-colored, closer to rosé or the red wines of Alsace. However recently there has been greatly increased demand and darker, richer red wines (often barrique-aged) are produced from grapes such as Dornfelder and Spätburgunder, the German name for Pinot noir.

Perhaps the most distinctive characteristic of German wines is the high level of acidity in them, caused both by the lesser ripeness in a northerly climate and by the selection of grapes such as Riesling, which retain acidity even at high ripeness levels.

== History ==
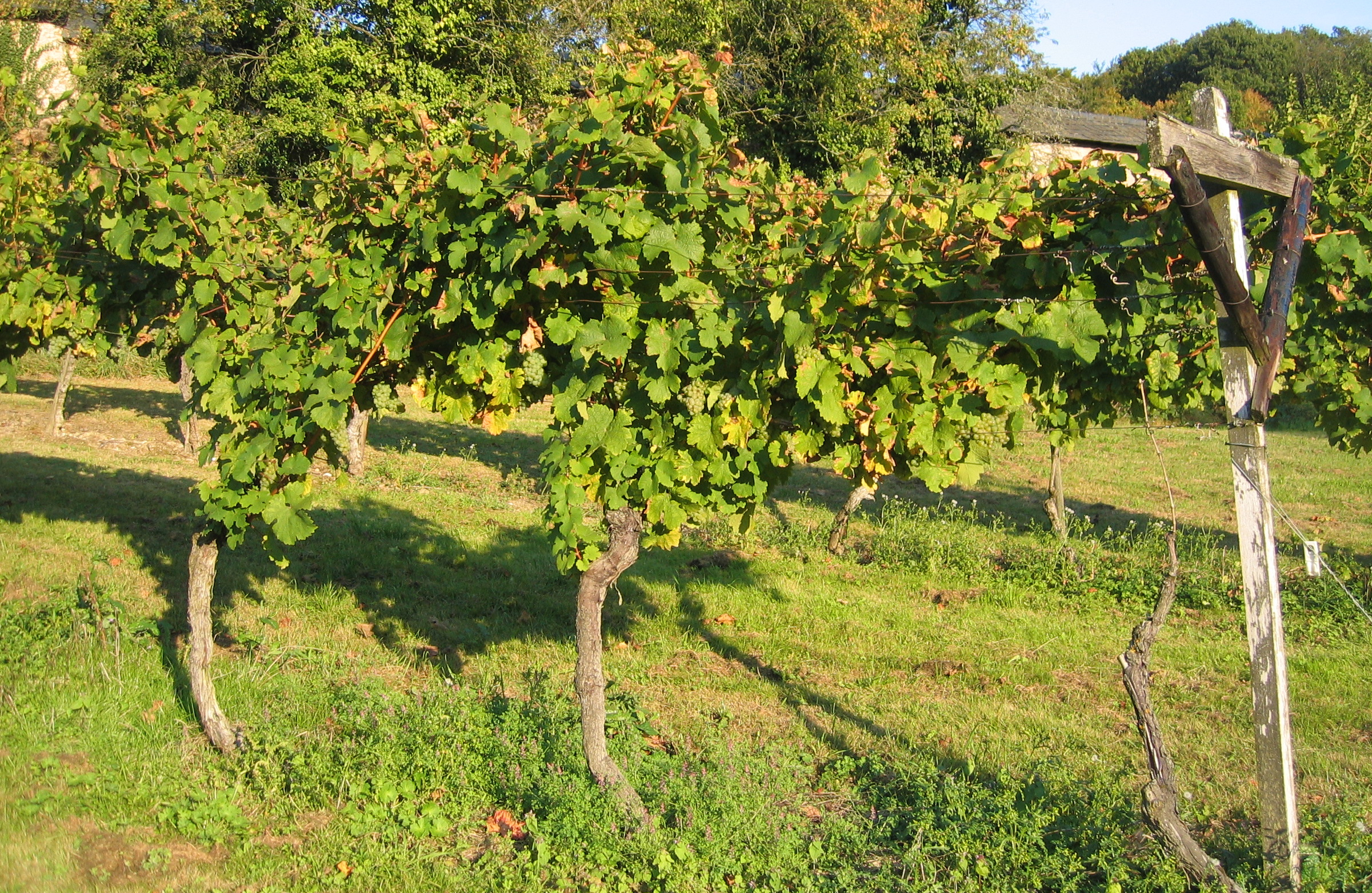
Vine trellising according to the Pfälzer Kammertbau system traditional to the Palatinate, where it was widely used until the 18th century. In an all-wooden version (without the steel wires), this system is supposed to date back to Roman times.

=== Early history ===
Viticulture in present-day Germany dates back to Ancient Roman times, to sometime from 70 to 270 CE/AD (Agri Decumates). In those days, the western parts of today's Germany made up the outpost of the Roman empire against the Germanic tribes on the other side of Rhine. What is generally considered Germany's oldest city, Trier, was founded as a Roman garrison and is situated directly on the river Moselle (Mosel) in the eponymous wine region. The oldest archeological finds that may indicate early German viticulture are curved pruning knives found in the vicinity of Roman garrisons, dating from the 1st century AD. However, it is not absolutely certain that these knives were used for viticultural purposes. Emperor Probus, whose reign can be dated two centuries later than these knives, is generally considered the founder of German viticulture, but for solid documentation of winemaking on German soil, we must go to around 370 AD, when Ausonius of Bordeaux wrote Mosella, where he in enthusiastic terms described the steep vineyards on the river Moselle.

The wild vine, the forerunner of the cultivated Vitis vinifera is known to have grown on upper Rhine back to historic time, and it is possible (but not documented) that Roman-era German viticulture was started using local varieties. Many viticultural practices were however taken from other parts of the Roman empire, as evidenced by Roman-style trellising systems surviving into the 18th century in some parts of Germany, such as the Kammertbau in the Palatinate.

Almost nothing is known of the style or quality of "German" wines that were produced in the Roman era, with the exception of the fact that the poet Venantius Fortunatus mentions red German wine around AD 570.

=== From Medieval times to today ===
Before the era of Charlemagne, Germanic viticulture was practiced primarily, although not exclusively, on the western side of Rhine. Charlemagne is supposed to have brought viticulture to Rheingau. The eastward spread of viticulture coincided with the spread of Christianity, which was supported by Charlemagne. Thus, in Medieval Germany, churches and monasteries played the most important role in viticulture, and especially in the production of quality wine. Two Rheingau examples illustrate this: archbishop Ruthard of Mainz (reigning 1089–1109) founded a Benedictine abbey on slopes above Geisenheim, the ground of which later became Schloss Johannisberg. His successor Adalbert of Mainz donated land above Hattenheim in 1135 to Cistercians, sent out from Clairvaux in Champagne, who founded Kloster Eberbach.

Many grape varieties commonly associated with German wines have been documented back to the 14th or 15th century. Riesling has been documented from 1435 (close to Rheingau), and Pinot noir from 1318 on Lake Constance under the name Klebroth, from 1335 in Affenthal in Baden and from 1470 in Rheingau, where the monks kept a Clebroit-Wyngart in Hattenheim. The most grown variety in medieval Germany was however Elbling, with Silvaner also being common, and Muscat, Räuschling and Traminer also being recorded.

For several centuries of the Medieval era, the vineyards of Germany (including Alsace) expanded, and is believed to have reached their greatest extent sometime around 1500, when perhaps as much as four times the present vineyard surface was planted. Basically, the wine regions were located in the same places as today, but more lands around the rivers, and land further upstream Rhine's tributaries, was cultivated. The subsequent decline can be attributed to locally produced beer becoming the everyday beverage in northern Germany in the 16th century, leading to a partial loss of market for wine, to the Thirty Years' War ravaging Germany in the 17th century, to the dissolution of the monasteries, where much of the winemaking know-how was concentrated, in those areas that accepted the Protestant reformation, and to the climatic changes of the Little Ice Age that made viticulture difficult or impossible in marginal areas.

An important event took place in 1775 at Schloss Johannisberg in Rheingau, when the courier delivering the harvest permission was delayed for two weeks, with the result that most of the grapes in Johannisberg's Riesling-only vineyard had been affected by noble rot before the harvest began. Unexpectedly, these "rotten grapes" gave a very good sweet wine, which was termed Spätlese, meaning late harvest. From this time, late harvest wines from grapes affected by noble rot have been produced intentionally. The subsequent differentiation of wines based on harvested ripeness, starting with Auslese in 1787, laid the ground for the Prädikat system. These laws, introduced in 1971, define the designations still used today.

At one point the Church controlled most of the major vineyards in Germany. Quality instead of quantity become important and spread quickly down the river Rhine. In the 1800s, Napoleon took control of all the vineyards from the Church, including the best, and divided and secularized them. In 1801, all German states west of the Rhine river were incorporated into the French state. This included the wine regions Ahr, Mosel, Nahe, Rheinhessen, and Pfalz, i.e., the vast majority of German wine production. Since then the Napoleonic inheritance laws in Germany broke up the parcels of vineyards further, leading to the establishment of many cooperatives. However, many notable and world-famous wineries in Germany have managed to acquire or hold enough land to produce wine not only for domestic consumption, but also export. After the battle of Waterloo and Napoleon’s final defeat, the Rhineland (which encompasses the viticultural regions Mosel, Mittelrhein, Nahe and Ahr) fell to Prussia, while the Palatinate (Pfalz) fell to Bavaria. Hesse Darmstadt received what is today known as Rheinhessen. Many of the best vineyards were transferred to the new states, where they were wrapped up as state domains.

Custom-free access to the vast Prussian markets in the east and the growing industrial clusters on the Ruhr and protection from non-Prussian competitors, including from southern German regions such Baden, Württemberg, Palatinate and Rheinhessen, fostered Mosel, Rhine, Nahe and Ahr winemakers, due to high tariff barriers for all other producers.

== Geography and climate ==
The German wine regions are some of the most northerly in the world. The main wine-producing climate lies below the 50th parallel, which runs through the regions Rheingau and Mosel. Above this line the climate becomes less conducive to wine production, but there are still some vineyards above this line and the effects of climate change on wine production are growing.

Because of the northerly climate, there has been a search for suitable grape varieties (particularly frost resistant and early harvesting ones), and many crosses have been developed, such as Müller-Thurgau in the Geisenheim Grape Breeding Institute. Since several years ago there has been an increase in plantings of Riesling as local and international demand has been demanding high quality wines.

The wines are all produced around rivers, mainly the Rhine and its tributaries, often sheltered by mountains. The rivers have significant microclimate effects to moderate the temperature. The soil is slate in the steep valleys, to absorb the sun's heat and retain it overnight. On the rolling hills the soil is lime and clay dominated. The great sites are often extremely steep so they catch the most sunlight, but they are difficult to harvest mechanically. The slopes are also positioned facing the south or south-west to angle towards the sun.

The vineyards are extremely small compared to New World vineyards and wine making is dominated by craft rather than industry wines. This makes the lists of wines produced long and complex, and many wines hard to obtain as production is so limited.

== Regions ==
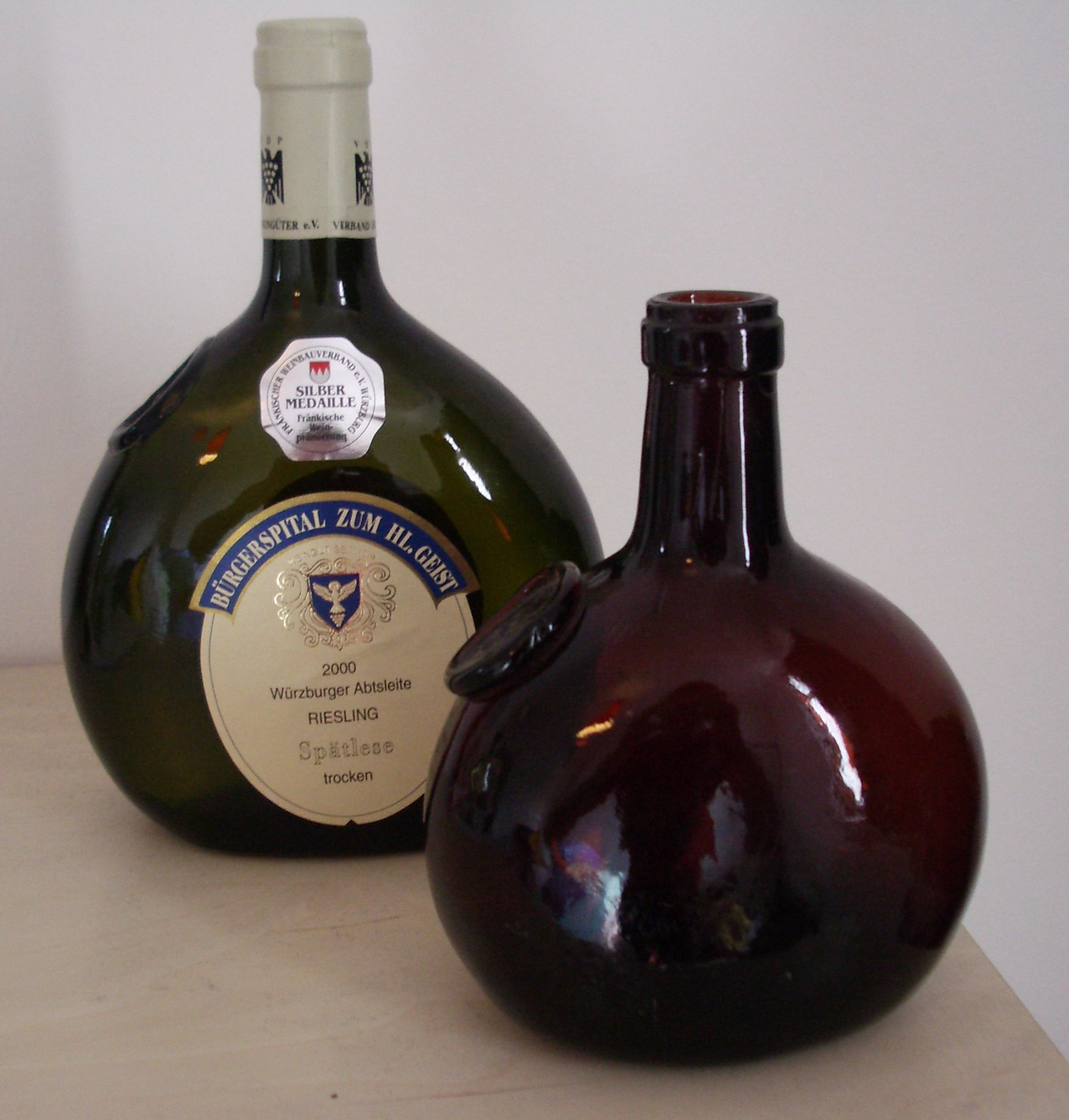
German wine from Franken in the characteristic round bottles (Bocksbeutel)

The wine regions in Germany usually referred to are the 13 defined regions for quality wine. The German wine industry has organised itself around these regions and their division into districts. However, there are also a number of regions for the insignificant table wine (Tafelwein) and country wine (Landwein) categories. Those regions with a few exceptions overlap with the quality wine regions. To make a clear distinction between the quality levels, the regions and subregions for different quality levels have different names on purpose, even when they are allowed to be produced in the same geographical area.

=== German wine regions ===
There are 13 defined regions ("Anbaugebiete") in Germany:

1. Ahr – a small region along the river Ahr, a tributary of Rhine, that despite its northernly location primarily produces red wine from Spätburgunder.
2. Baden – Germany's southernmost, warmest and sunniest winegrowing region, in Germany's southwestern corner, across river Rhine from Alsace, and the only German wine region situated in European Union wine growing zone B rather than A, which results in higher minimum required maturity of grapes and less chaptalisation allowed. Most of the land is cultivated with Pinot family. That include Pinot Noir (Spätburgunder), Pinot Gris (Grauburgunder) and Pinot Blanc (Weissburgunder).
3. Franconia or Franken – around portions of Main river, and the only wine region situated in Bavaria. Noted for growing many varieties on chalky soil and for producing powerful dry Silvaner wines. In Germany, only Franconia and certain small parts of the Baden region are allowed to use the distinctive flattened Bocksbeutel bottle shape.
4. Hessische Bergstraße (Hessian Mountain Road) – a small region in the state Hesse dominated by Riesling.
5. Mittelrhein – along the middle portions of river Rhine, primarily between the regions Rheingau and Mosel, and dominated by Riesling.
6. Mosel – along the river Moselle (Mosel) and its tributaries, the rivers Saar and Ruwer, and was previously known as Mosel-Saar-Ruwer. The Mosel region is dominated by Riesling grapes and slate soils, and the best wines are grown in dramatic-looking steep vineyards directly overlooking the rivers. This region produces wine that is light in body due to lower alcohol levels, crisp, of high acidity and with pronounced mineral character. The only region to stick to Riesling wine with noticeable residual sweetness as the "standard" style, although dry wines are also produced.
7. Nahe – around the river Nahe where volcanic origins give very varied soils. Mixed grape varieties but the best-known producers primarily grow Riesling, and some of them have achieved world reputation in recent years.
8. Palatinate or Pfalz – the second largest producing region in Germany, with production of very varied styles of wine (especially in the southern half), where red wine has been on the increase. The northern half of the region is home to many well-known Riesling producers with a long history, which specialize in powerful Riesling wines in a dry style. Until 1995, it was known in German as Rheinpfalz.
9. Rheingau – a small region at a bend in the Rhine that provide excellent conditions for winegrowing. The oldest documented references to Riesling come from the Rheingau region and it is the region where many German winemaking practices have originated, such as the use of Prädikat designations. Dominated by Riesling with some Spätburgunder. The Rheingau Riesling style is in-between Mosel and the Palatinate and other southern regions, and at its finest combines the best aspects of both.
10. Rheinhessen or Rhenish Hesse – the largest production area in Germany. Once known as Liebfraumilch land, but a quality revolution has taken place since the 1990s. Mixed wine styles and both red and white wines. The best Riesling wines are similar to Palatinate Riesling – dry and powerful. Despite its name, it lies in the state of Rhineland-Palatinate, not in Hesse.
11. Saale-Unstrut – one of two regions in former East Germany along the rivers Saale and Unstrut, and Germany's northernmost winegrowing region.
12. Saxony or Sachsen – one of two regions in former East Germany, in the southeastern corner of the country, along the river Elbe in the state of Saxony.
13. Württemberg – a traditional red wine region, where grape varieties Trollinger (the region's signature variety), Schwarzriesling and Lemberger outnumber the varieties that dominate elsewhere. One of two wine regions in the state of Baden-Württemberg.

These 13 regions (Anbaugebiete) are broken down into 39 districts (Bereiche) which are further broken down into collective vineyard sites (Großlagen) of which there are 167. The individual vineyard sites (Einzellagen) number 2,658.

=== Sorted by size ===
Data from 2023.

Region	Vineyard area (ha)	% White	% Red	Districts	Collective sites	Individual sites	Most grown varieties
Rheinhessen	27499	74	26	3	24	442	Riesling (19.6%), Müller-Thurgau (13.9%), Dornfelder (11.0%), Pinot gris (8.8%), Silvaner (6.8%), Pinot blanc (6.0%), Pinot Noir (5.5%), Chardonnay (4.0%), Portugieser 3.2%), Scheurebe (2.7%)
Palatinate	23793	68	32	2	25	330	Riesling (25.2%), Dornfelder (10.3%), Pinot gris (9.4%), Pinot noir (7.3%), Müller-Thurgau (6.7%), Pinot blanc (6.3%), Portugieser (4.4%), Chardonnay (4.1%), Sauvignon blanc (3.3%)
Baden	15727	62	38	9	15	315	Pinot noir (32.1%), Pinot gris (15.3%), Müller-Thurgau (13.8%), Pinot blanc (10.6%), Gutedel (6.5%), Riesling (5.6)%
Württemberg	11392	36	64	6	20	207	Riesling (62.4%), Trollinger (8.7%), Lemberger (5.2%), Pinot noir (5.1%), Pinot Meunier (4.4%)
Mosel	8536	91	9	6	20	507	Riesling (62.4%), Müller-Thurgau (9.0%), Elbling (5.0%), Pinot noir (5.0%), Pinot blanc (4.4%)
Franconia	6173	83	17	3	22	211	Silvaner (25.3%), Müller-Thurgau (22.3%), Bacchus (11.9%), Riesling (5.5%), Domina (4.8%), Pinot noir (4.5%)
Nahe	4249	77	23	1	7	312	Riesling (29.3%), Müller-Thurgau (11.0%); Pinot gis (9.3%), Dornfelder (8.9%), Pinot blanc (7.8%), Pinot noir (7.0%)
Rheingau	3207	85	15	1	11	120	Riesling (76.1%), Pinot noir (12.6%), Pinot blanc (2.1%); Pinot gis (1.1%)
Saale-Unstrut	853	77	23	2	4	20	Müller-Thurgau (14.3%), Pinot blanc (13.7%), Riesling (9.4%), Dornfelder (6.4%), Bacchus (6.4%)
Ahr	531	21	79	1	1	43	Pinot noir (64.7%), Riesling (8.2%), Pinot Noir Précoce (5.8%), Pinot blanc (4.1%), Regent (2.8%)
Saxony	522	81	19	2	4	16	Riesling (14.2%), Müller-Thurgau (11.4%), Pinot blanc (11.5%), Pinot gris (9.2%)
Mittelrhein	460	84	16	2	11	111	Riesling (63.3%), Pinot noir (10.7%), Pinot blanc (5.2%)
Hessische Bergstraße	461	79	21	2	3	24	Riesling (35.6%), Pinot gris (12.8%), Pinot noir (10.8%), Pinot blanc (5.6%)

=== Tafelwein and Landwein regions ===
There are seven regions for Tafelwein (Weinbaugebiete für Tafelwein), three of which are divided into two or three subregions (Untergebiete) each, and 21 regions for Landwein (Landweingebiete). These regions have the following relationship to each other, and to the quality wine regions:

Tafelwein region	Tafelwein subregion	Landwein region	Corresponding quality wine region	Number on map
Rhein-Mosel	Rhein	Ahrtaler Landwein	Ahr	1
Rhein-Mosel	Rhein	Rheinburgen-Landwein	Mittelrhein	5
Rhein-Mosel	Rhein	Rheingauer Landwein	Rheingau	9
Rhein-Mosel	Rhein	Nahegauer Landwein	Nahe	7
Rhein-Mosel	Rhein	Rheinischer Landwein	Rheinhessen	10
Rhein-Mosel	Rhein	Pfälzer Landwein	Palatinate	8
Rhein-Mosel	Rhein	Starkenburger Landwein	Hessische Bergstraße	4
Rhein-Mosel	Moseltal	Landwein der Mosel	Mosel	6
Rhein-Mosel	Moseltal	Landwein der Saar	Mosel	6
Rhein-Mosel	Moseltal	Saarländischer Landwein	Mosel	6
Rhein-Mosel	Moseltal	Landwein der Ruwer	Mosel	6
Bayern	Main	Landwein Main	Franconia	3
Bayern	Donau	Regensburger Landwein	Franconia	3
Bayern	Lindau	Bayerischer Bodensee-Landwein	Württemberg	13
Neckar	–	Schwäbischer Landwein	Württemberg	13
Oberrhein	Römertor	Badischer Landwein	Baden	2
Oberrhein	Burgengau	Taubertäler Landwein	Baden	2
Albrechtsburg	–	Sächsischer Landwein	Saxony	12
Saale-Unstrut		Mitteldeutscher Landwein	Saale-Unstrut	11
Niederlausitz	–	Brandenburger Landwein	In the state of Brandenburg, outside the quality wine regions	
Stargarder Land	–	Mecklenburger Landwein	In the state of Mecklenburg-Vorpommern, outside the quality wine regions	

== Grape varieties ==
Overall nearly 135 grape varieties may be cultivated in Germany – 100 are released for white wine production and 35 for red wine production. According to the international image, Germany is still considered a region for white wine production. Since the 1980s, demand for German red wine has constantly increased, and this has resulted in a doubling of the vineyards used for red wine. Nowadays, over 35% of the vineyards are cultivated with red grapes. Some of the red grapes are also used to produce rosé.

Out of all the grape varieties listed below, only 20 have a significant market share.

Most common grape varieties in Germany (2022 situation, all varieties >1%)
Variety	Color	Synonym(s)	Area (%)	Area (hectares)	Trend	Major regions (with large plantations or high proportion)
1. Riesling	white		23.6	24 410	increasing	Mosel, Palatinate, Rheingau, Rheinhessen, Nahe, Mittelrhein, Hessische Bergstraße
2. Müller-Thurgau	white	Rivaner	10.6	10 970	decreasing	Rheinhessen, Baden, Franconia, Mosel, Saale-Unstrut, Sachsen
3. Spätburgunder	red	Pinot noir	11.1	11 512	constant	Baden, Palatinate, Rheinhessen, Württemberg, Rheingau, Ahr
4. Grauburgunder	white	Pinot gris, Grauer Burgunder Ruländer	7.8	8 094	increasing	Rheinhessen, Palatinate, Mosel
5. Dornfelder	red		6.6	6 812	decreasing	Rheinhessen, Palatinate, Nahe
6. Weißburgunder	white	Pinot blanc, Weißer Burgunder, Klevner	6.0	6 181	increasing	bgcolor="FFA07A"
7. Silvaner	white	Grüner Silvaner	4.3	4 419	decreasing	Rheinhessen, Franconia, Saale-Unstrut, Ahr
8. Chardonnay	white		2.6	2 731	increasing	
9. Blauer Portugieser	red		2.2	2 295	decreasing	Palatinate, Rheinhessen, Ahr
10. Kerner	white		2.0	2 032	decreasing	Rheinhessen, Palatinate, Mosel, Württemberg
11. Trollinger	red		1.9	1 940	constant	Württemberg
12. Lemberger	red	Blaufränkisch	1.9	1 929	increasing	Württemberg
13. Sauvignon blanc	white		1.9	1 923	increasing	
14. Schwarzriesling	red	Müllerrebe, Pinot Meunier	1.6	1 698	decreasing	Württemberg
15. Regent	red		1.6	1 618	constant	
16. Bacchus	white		1.5	1 558	decreasing	Franconia
17. Scheurebe	white		1.4	1 483	increasing	Rheinhessen
18. Traminer	white	Gewürztraminer	1.1	1 120	increasing	
19. Gutedel	white	Chasselas	1.0	1 065	constant	Baden
Grand total			100.0	103 391	constant	

=== Grape variety trends over time ===
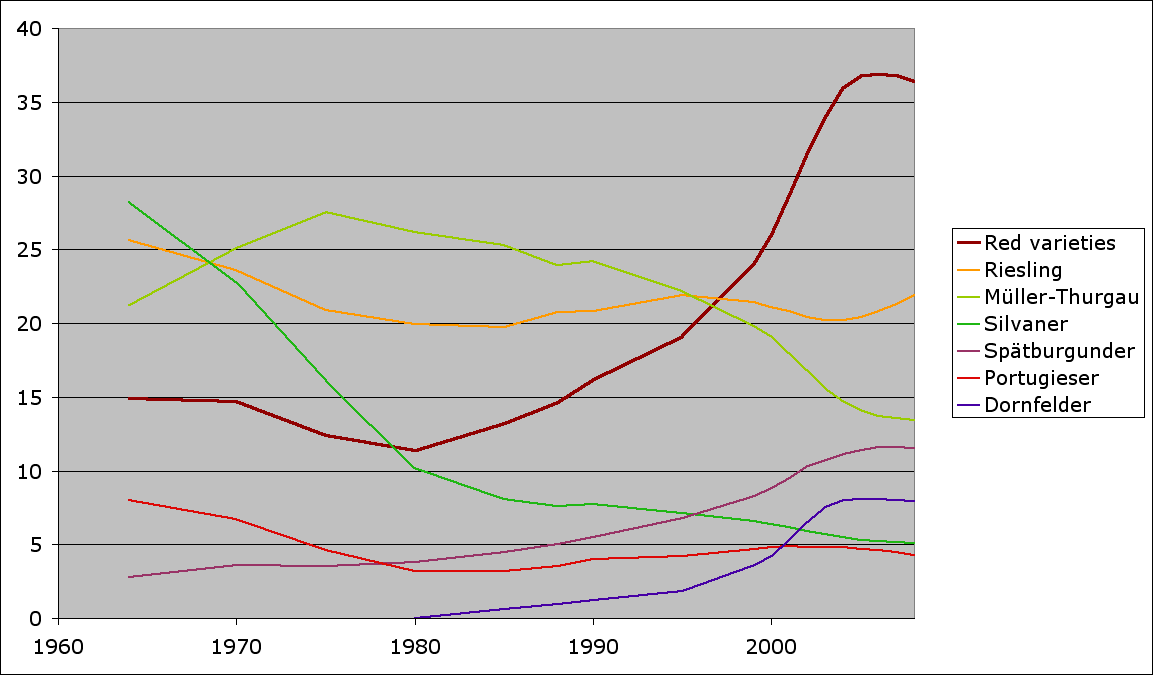
Per cent share of common grape varieties in Germany 1964–2007. Data taken from German Wine Statistics.

During the last century several changes have taken place with respect to the most planted varieties. Until the early 20th century, Elbling was Germany's most planted variety, after which it was eclipsed by Silvaner during the middle of the 20th century. After a few decades in the top spot, in the late 1960s Silvaner was overtaken by the high-yielding Müller-Thurgau, which in turn started to lose ground in the 1980s. From the mid-1990s, Riesling became the most planted variety, a position it probably had never enjoyed before on a national level. Red grapes in Germany have experienced several ups and downs. Throughout the 1960s and 1970s, there was a downward trend, which was reversed around 1980. From mid-1990s and during the next decade, there was an almost explosive growth of plantation of red varieties. Plantings was shared between traditional Spätburgunder and a number of new crossings, led by Dornfelder, while other traditional German red varieties such as Portugieser only held their ground. From around 2005, the proportion of red varieties has stabilized around 37%, about three times the 1980 level.

=== Common white wine grapes ===
White grape varieties account for 66% of the area planted in Germany. Principal varieties are listed below; there are larger numbers of less important varieties too.

- Riesling is the benchmark grape in Germany and covers the most area in German vineyards. It is an aromatic variety with a high level of acidity that can be used for dry, semi-sweet, sweet and sparkling wines. The drawback to Riesling is that it takes 130 days to ripen and, in marginal years, the Riesling crop tends to be poor.
- Müller-Thurgau is an alternative grape to Riesling that growers have been using, and is one of the so-called new crossings. Unlike the long ripening time of Riesling, this grape variety only requires 100 days to ripen, can be planted on more sites, and is higher yielding. However, this grape has a more neutral flavour than Riesling, and as the main ingredient of Liebfraumilch its reputation has taken a beating together with that wine variety. Germany's most planted variety from the 1970s to the mid-1990s, it has been losing ground for a number of years. Dry Müller-Thurgau is usually labeled Rivaner.
- Grauer Burgunder or Ruländer (Pinot gris)
- Weisser Burgunder (Pinot blanc)
- Silvaner is another subtle, fairly neutral, but quite old grape variety that was Germany's most planted until the 1960s and after that has continued to lose ground. It has however remained popular in Franconia and Rheinhessen, where it is grown on chalky soils to produce powerful dry wines with a slightly earthy and rustic but also food-friendly character.
- Chardonnay
- Kerner
- Sauvignon blanc
- Bacchus
- Scheurebe

=== Common red wine grapes ===
Red wine varieties account for 34% of the plantations in Germany but has increased in recent years.

- Spätburgunder (Pinot noir) – a much-appreciated grape variety that demands good sites to produce good wines and therefore competes with Riesling. It is considered to give the most elegant red wines of Germany.
- Dornfelder – a "new crossing" that has become much appreciated in Germany since it is easy to grow and gives dark-coloured, full-bodied, fruity and tannic wines of a style that used to be hard to produce in Germany.
- Portugieser
- Trollinger
- Lemberger (Blaufränkisch)
- Schwarzriesling (Pinot Meunier)
- Regent
- Merlot
- St. Laurent

=== Permitted varieties ===
According to the German wine law, the state governments are responsible for drawing up lists of grape varieties allowed in wine production. The varieties listed below are officially permitted for commercial cultivation. The lists include varieties permitted only for selected experimental cultivation.

permitted white grapes
Albalonga; Arnsburger; Auxerrois blanc; Bacchus; Blauer Silvaner; Bronner; Chardonnay; Ehrenbreitsteiner; Ehrenfelser; Elbling; Faberrebe; Findling; Fontanara; Freisamer; Früher Malingre; Gelber Muskateller; Gewürztraminer	Goldriesling; Grauburgunder; Gutedel; Hibernal; Hölder; Huxelrebe; Irsay Oliver; Johanniter; Juwel; Kanzler; Kerner; Kernling; Mariensteiner; Merzling; Morio-Muskat; Müller-Thurgau (Rivaner); Muskat-Ottonel	Nobling; Optima; Orion; Ortega; Osteiner; Perle; Perle von Csaba; Phoenix; Prinzipal; Regner; Reichensteiner; Rieslaner; Riesling; Roter Elbling; Roter Gutedel; Roter Muskateller; Sauvignon blanc	Scheurebe; Schönburger; Septimer; Siegerrebe; Silcher; Silvaner; Sirius; Staufer; Veltliner; Weißer Burgunder; Würzer

permitted red grapes
Acolon; André; Blauburger; Cabernet Dorsa; Cabernet Mitos; Cabernet Sauvignon; Dakapo; Deckrot; Domina	Dornfelder; Dunkelfelder; Frühburgunder; Hegel; Helfensteiner; Heroldrebe; Lemberger	Merlot; Muskat-Trollinger; Palas; Portugieser; Regent; Rondo; Rotberger; Schwarzriesling	Spätburgunder; St. Laurent; Tauberschwarz; Trollinger; Zweigelt

== Viticultural practices ==
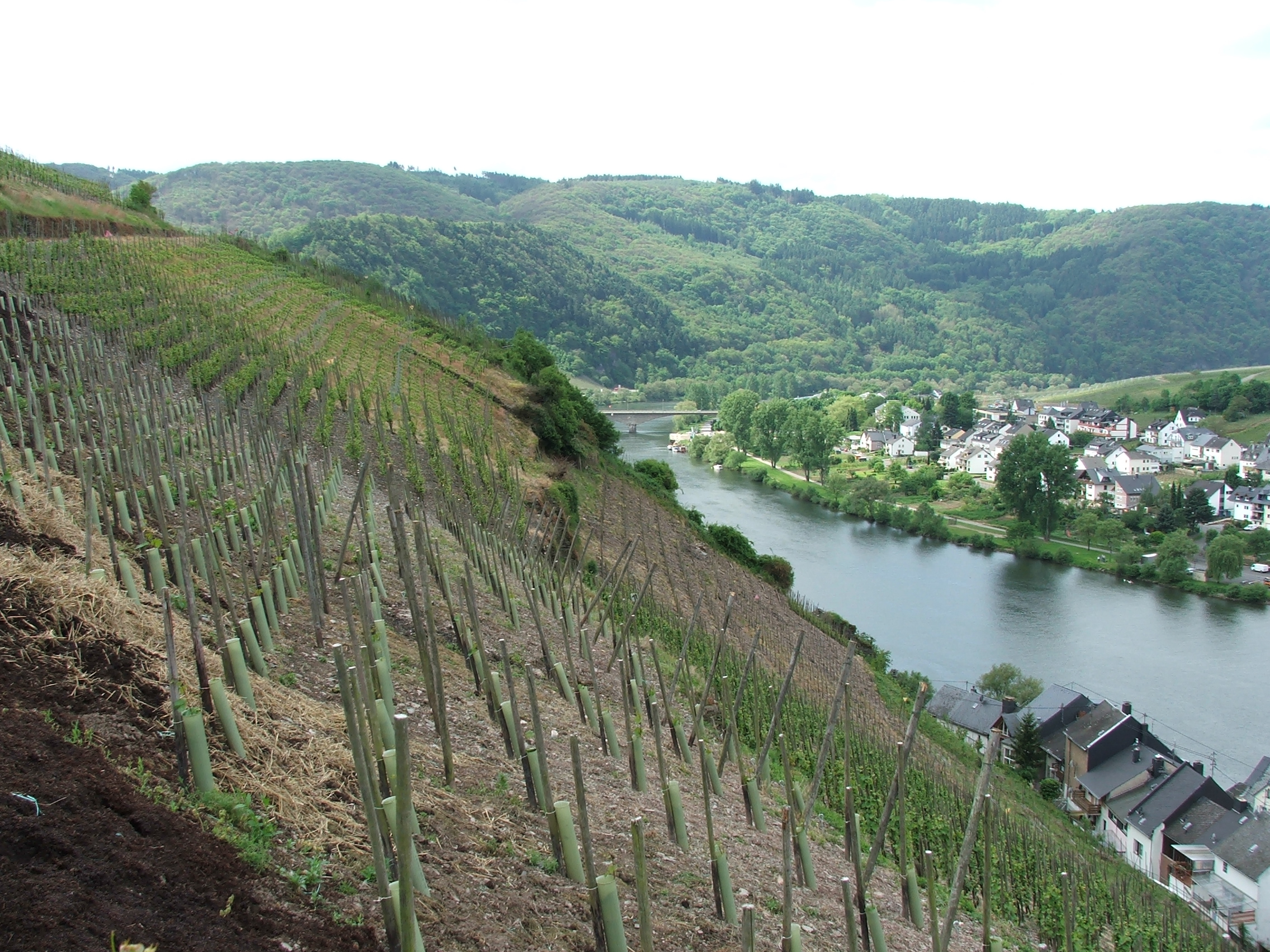
In the Mosel region, such as here close to the village of Zell, vines are often trained on individual wooden stakes, Einzelpfahlerziehung.

Many of the best vineyards in Germany are steep vineyards overlooking rivers, where mechanisation is impossible and a lot of manual labour is needed to produce the wine.

Since it can be difficult to get ripe grapes in such a northernly location as Germany, the sugar maturity of grapes (must weight) as measured by the Oechsle scale have played a great role in Germany.

German vintners on average crop their vineyards quite high, with yields averaging around 64–99 hl/ha, a high figure in international comparison. Some crossings used for low-quality white wine yield up to 150–200 hl/ha, while quality-conscious producers who strive to produce well-balanced wines of concentrated flavours rarely exceed 50 hl/ha.

Many wines in Germany are produced using organic farming or biodynamic methods. With an average annual growth rate of 25 percent and a cultivated area of more than 7,000 hectares, Germany ranks in place six worldwide. The market share of organic wine is between four and five percent.

== Winemaking practices ==
Chaptalization is allowed only up to the QbA level, not for Prädikatswein and all wines must be fermented dry if chaptalised. To balance the wine, unfermented grape juice, called Süssreserve, may be added after fermentation.

== Classification ==
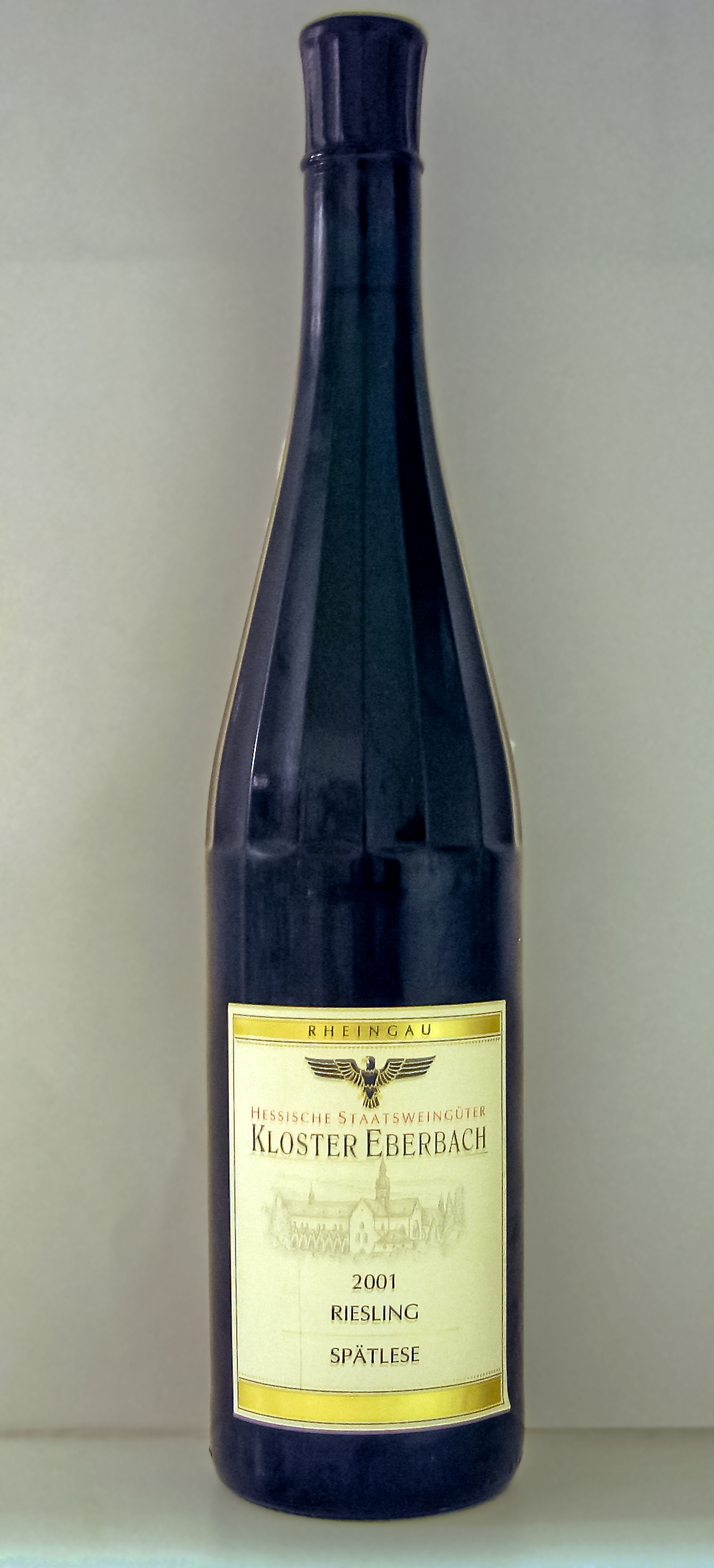
A German wine bottle, designed for Rheingau wine

German wine classification is sometimes the source of confusion. However, to those familiar with the terms used, a German wine label reveals much information about the wine's origin, the minimum ripeness of the grapes used for the wine, as well as the dryness/sweetness of the wine.

In general, the ripeness classifications of German wines reflect minimum sugar content in the grape (also known as "potential alcohol" = the amount of alcohol resulting from fermenting all sugar in the juice) at the point of harvest of the grape. They have nothing to do with the sweetness of the wine after fermentation, which is one of the most common mis-perceptions about German wines.

- Deutscher Tafelwein (German table wine) is mostly consumed in the country and not exported. Generally used for blended wines that can not be Qualitätswein.
- Deutscher Landwein (German country wine) comes from a larger designation and again doesn't play an important role in the export market.
- Qualitätswein bestimmter Anbaugebiete (QbA) wines from a defined appellation with the exception of Liebfraumilch, which can be blended from several regions and still be classified as Qualitätswein.
- Prädikatswein, recently (August 1, 2007) renamed from Qualitätswein mit Prädikat (QmP) wines made from grapes of higher ripeness. As ripeness increases, the fruit characteristics and price increase. Categories within Prädikatswein are Kabinett, Spätlese, Auslese, Beerenauslese, Trockenbeerenauslese and Eiswein. Wines of these categories can not be chaptalized. All these categories within Prädikatswein are solely linked to minimum requirements of potential alcohol. While these may correlate with harvest time, there are no legally defined harvest time restrictions anymore.
  - Kabinett wines are made from grapes that have achieved minimum defined potential alcohol levels. Those minimum requirements differ by region and grape variety. Essentially, Kabinett is the first level of reserve grape selection.
  - Spätlese wines ("late harvest") are made from grapes that have achieved minimum defined potential alcohol levels. Those minimum requirements differ by region and grape variety. Essentially, Spatlese is the second level of reserve grape selection.
  - Auslese ("select harvest") wines are made from grapes that have achieved minimum defined potential alcohol levels. Those minimum requirements differ by region and grape variety. Essentially, Auslese is the third level of reserve grape selection.
  - Beerenauslese wines ("berry selection") are made from grapes that have achieved minimum defined potential alcohol levels. The concentration of the grape juice may have been facilitated by a fungus Botrytis, which perforates the skin of the grape forcing water to drip out and all remaining elements to concentrate. Due to the high potential alcohol level required for this category of ripeness, these wines are generally made into sweet wines and can make good dessert wines.
  - Trockenbeerenauslese wines ("dry berries selection") are made from grapes of an even higher potential alcohol level, generally reachable only with the help of Botrytis. The grapes used for Trockenbeerenauslese have reached an even more raisin-like state than those used for Beerenauslese. Due to the high concentration of sugar in the raisin-like grape, these wines can only be made in a sweet style and make extremely sweet, concentrated and usually quite expensive wines.
  - Eiswein (ice wine) wine is made grapes that freeze naturally on the vine and have to reach the same potential alcohol level as Beerenauslese. The grapes are harvested and pressed in the frozen state. The ice stays in the press during pressing and hence a concentrated juice flows off the press leading to higher potential alcohol levels, which in turn generally result in sweet wines due to the high potential alcohol. The taste differs from the other high-level wines since Botrytis infection is usually lower, ideally completely absent.

On wine labels, German wine may be classified according to the residual sugar of the wine. Trocken refers to dry wine. These wines have less than 9 grams/liter of residual sugar. Halbtrocken wines are off-dry and have 9–18 grams/liter of residual sugar. Due to the high acidity ("crispness") of many German wines, the taste profile of many halbtrocken wines fall within the "internationally dry" spectrum rather than being appreciably sweet. Feinherb wines are slightly sweeter than halbtrocken wines. Lieblich wines are noticeably sweet; except for the high category Prädikatsweine of type Beerenauslese and above, lieblich wines from Germany are usually of the low Tafelwein category. The number of German wines produced in a lieblich style has dropped markedly since the style went out of fashion in the 1980s.

In recent years, the Verband Deutscher Prädikatsweingüter (VDP), which is a private marketing club founded in 1910, has lobbied for the recognition of a vineyard classification, but its effort have not yet changed national law.

There are also several terms to identify the grower and producers of the wine:

- Weingut refers to a winegrowing and wine-producing estate, rather craft than industry.
- Weinkellerei refers to a maturing and bottling facility, a bottler or shipper.
- Winzergenossenschaft refers to a winemaking cooperative.
- Gutsabfüllung refers to a grower/producer wine that is estate bottled.
- Abfüller refers to a bottler or shipper.

== Industry structure ==
The German wine scene consists of many small craft oriented vineyard owners. The 2023 viticultural survey counted 14.150 vineyard owners, down from 76 683 in Western Germany in 1989/90. Most of the 2.570 operators of less than 0.5 ha should likely be classified as hobby winemakers. Two digit decreases of operating owners change the structure. Many smaller vineyard owners do not pursue viticulture as a full-time occupation, but rather as a supplement to other agriculture or to hospitality. It is not uncommon for a visitor to a German wine region to find that a small family-owned Gasthaus has its own wine. Smaller grape-growers who do not wish to, or are unable to, commercialise their own wine have several options available: sell the grapes (either on the market each harvest year, or on long-term contract with larger wineries looking to supplement their own production), deliver the grapes to a winemaking cooperative (called Winzergenossenschaft in Germany), or sell the wine in bulk to winemaking firms that use them in "bulk brands" or as a base wine for Sekt. Those who own vineyards in truly good locations also have the option of renting them out to larger producers to operate.

A total of 5,864 vineyard owners owned more than 5 ha each in 2016, accounting for 81% of Germany's total vineyard surface, and it is in this category that the full-time vintners and commercial operations are primarily found. However, truly large wineries, in terms of their own vineyard holdings, are rare in Germany. Hardly any German wineries reach the size of New World winemaking companies, and only a few are of the same size as a typical Bordeaux Grand Cru Classé château. Of the ten wineries considered as Germany's best by Gault Millau Weinguide in 2007, nine had 10,2 — 19 ha of vineyards, and one (Weingut Robert Weil, owned by Suntory) had 70 ha. This means that most of the high-ranking German wineries each only produces around 100,000 bottles of wine per year. That production is often distributed over, say, 10–25 different wines from different vineyards, of different Prädikat, sweetness and so on. The largest vineyard owner is the Hessian State Wineries (Hessische Staatsweingüter), owned by the state of Hesse, with 200 ha vineyards, the produce of which is vinified in three separate wineries. The largest privately held winery is Dr. Bürklin-Wolf in the Palatinate with 85,5 ha.

=== Largest German wineries ===
By April 2014, the ten largest German wine producers were:

- Weingut Lergenmüller Hainfeld (Palatinate), 110 ha; and Schloss Reinhartshausen, 80 ha
- Juliusspital, Würzburg (Franken), 170 ha
- Weingut Heinz Pfaffmann, Walsheim (Palatinate), 150 ha
- Hessische Staatsweingüter Eltville (Rheingau), 140 ha
- Markgraf von Baden Salem (Baden), 140 ha
- Bischöfliche Weingüter Trier (Mosel), 95 ha
- Staatlicher Hofkeller Würzburg (Franconia), 120 ha
- Weingut Anselmann Edesheim (Palatinate), 115 ha
- Bürgerspital zum Heiligen Geist Würzburg (Franconia), 110 ha
- Weingut Friedrich Kiefer Eichstetten am Kaiserstuhl (Baden), 110 ha

== See also ==
- German cuisine
- Flurbereinigung
- Old World wine
- Austrian wine
- Swiss wine
- Alsace wine
- Winemaking
- Agriculture in Germany
