= Georg Scheu =

German botanist (1879–1949)

Georg Scheu (21 June 1879 in Krefeld, Rhine Province, Germany – 2 November 1949, in Alzey, Rhineland-Palatinate), was a German botanist, plant physiologist, oenologist and grape breeder.

== Biography ==
Georg Scheu completed horticultural training in Hanover and worked as a horticultural technician in Munich and Schierstein. Around 1900, he went to the Geisenheim Grape Breeding Institute in the Rheingau and then completed his training at the Kaiser Wilhelm Institute in Bydgoszcz (German: Bromberg).

It was during this time that Georg Scheu developed his love of the vine and viticulture, which led him to Alzey in 1909 as a district orchard technician. There he was appointed by the committee of the Chamber of Agriculture for the province of Rheinhessen as the first head of the newly founded vine nursery. Under his leadership, this was expanded into a large provincial vine breeding station.

Although Georg Scheu also published a pamphlet ″Anleitung zur Obst- und Gemüseverwertung während des Krieges″ (Instructions for Fruit and Vegetable Utilisation During the War) on 26 August 1915 with preserving recipes for apples, quince, pumpkin, beans ..., so that "the starvation plan of our enemies will be put to shame", his most important activity was research work in the fields of grape varieties, propagation of grapevines and grapevine diseases.

In 1921 he discovered leafroll disease in grapevines. In 1935 he published his findings on this vine disease in the journal "Der Deutsche Weinbau". Scheu attributed the cause of the transmission from healthy to diseased Vitis vinifera vines to a sap-transmissible virus. This is counted as a pioneering achievement in this field. The fanleaf virus was not detected until 1966.

His contribution to the improvement of vine material and his findings on chlorosis in grapevines are also merited. Scheu contributed significantly to the development of scientific and practical principles of grapevine research in the first half of the 20th century.

In addition to his research activities, Georg Scheu was also concerned with the problems of winegrowers, which he characterised as the ″Winzernot″. The provision of healthy planting material for viticulture and the improvement of rearing and cultivation methods in Rheinhessen were among his tasks. Georg Scheu was actively involved in the organisation and establishment of vine nurseries. Later he turned to clonal selection, conservation breeding and breeding new grape varieties that would produce higher yields and better qualities. His publication ″Mein Winzerbuch″, first published in 1936, is a practical book for winegrowers that was considered a standard work for several decades.

Georg Scheu is considered the most successful German vine breeder. His selections are internationally recognised.[3] He succeeded in breeding a number of important new varieties, the Scheurebe (in Austria Sämling 88) being the best known and also the most commercially successful. In 1916, Scheu selected the variety that was later named after him. With this vine he succeeded in creating one of the highest-quality new white wine varieties of the 20th century. The vine, also affectionately called Scheu by wine connoisseurs, has also firmly established itself in Germany and Austria in the segment of top wines and noble sweet wine rarities. It is not a copy of Riesling and is capable of producing independent growths with a sophisticated taste spectrum and long shelf life.

== Vine breeds ==
From 1909 to 1947, Georg Scheu was head of the Institute for Vine Breeding in Alzey, which resulted in important contributions to the research of various vine diseases as well as the new crossings of the following grape varieties:

- Scheurebe
- Huxelrebe
- Siegerrebe
- Faberrebe
- Kanzler
- Septimer
- Würzer
- Perle von Alzey
- Regner

== Literature ==
- Georg Scheu, Wilhelm Schottler, Die Gelbsucht der Weinberge in der Provinz Rheinhessen und ihr Zusammenhang mit den Bodenverhältnissen. In: Arbeiten der Landwirtschaftskammer für Hessen. Heft 35, Landwirtschaftskammer für Hessen, Darmstadt 1925.
- Georg Scheu, Mein Winzerbuch. Reichsnährstand Verlags-Ges.m.b.H., Berlin 1936.
- Georg Scheu, Heinz Scheu, Mein Winzerbuch. part 1. 1. Aufl., Meininger, Neustadt/Haardt 1950.
- Georg Scheu, Heinz Scheu, Mein Winzerbuch. part 2. Ergänzende Betrachtungen und Erfahrungen aus der Praxis. 2. Aufl., Meininger, Neustadt/Haardt 1954.
