= Niederlausitz (wine region) =

Small wine-growing region in Brandenburg, Germany

- Wine region
- Type: Weinbaugebiet for table wine (Tafelwein) and country wine (Landwein)
- Year established: 2007
- Country: Germany
- Climate region: EU wine growing zone A
- Total area: 11 hectares (2007)
- Wine produced: Brandenburger Landwein

Niederlausitz (Lower Lusatia) is a small region for table wine and country wine in eastern Germany, which was defined in an amendment to the German wine law in 2007. It is located in Brandenburg, which is the federal state surrounding Berlin. The designation Brandenburger Landwein is used for country wines from this region.

Lower Lusatia is not part of the 13 well-established German wine regions for quality wine (usually referred to as Anbaugebiete), and is located to the north of all of them, but south of Stargarder Land, which was defined in 2004. This means that Lower Lusatian wineries are not allowed to produce wine of all quality levels of the German wine classification. Only the lower part – Tafelwein (table wine) and Landwein (country wine) – and not the higher "quality wine" categories Qualitätswein bestimmter Anbaugebiete (QbA) and Prädikatswein may be produced.

Currently, the Niederlausitz region covers only 11 hectares (27 acres) of vineyards spread out over 14 locations. A peculiar aspect of the Niederlausitz region is that some of the vineyards are planted in former coal strip mines.
