= Albalonga (grape) =

Variety of grape

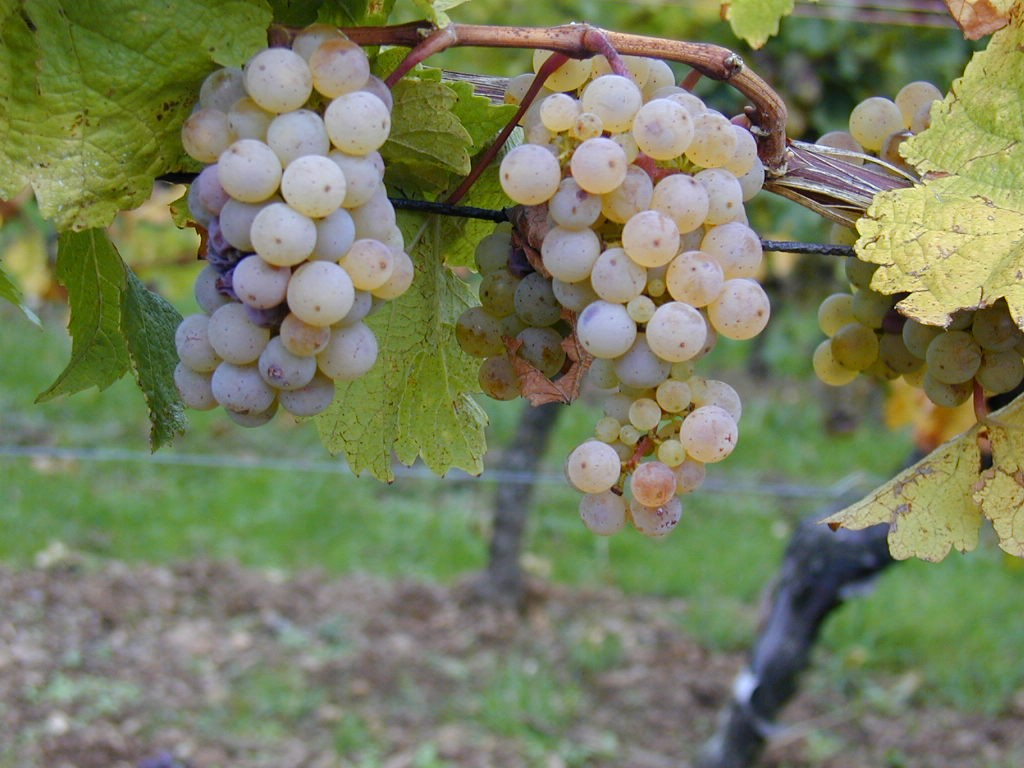
Albalonga on the vine

Albalonga is a white German wine grape variety that is a crossing between Rieslaner and Müller-Thurgau. It is grown primarily in the Rheinhessen where, in favorable vintages, it can produce wines up to auslese-level sweetness. However, the variety is prone to various grape rots which can make viticulture difficult for the variety.
