= Stargarder Land (wine region) =

German wine region

Coordinates: 53°34′23″N 13°36′55″E

- Wine region
- Type: Weinbaugebiet for table wine (Tafelwein) and country wine (Landwein)
- Year established: 2004
- Country: Germany
- Climate region: EU wine growing zone A
- Total area: 3.7 hectares
- Wine produced: Mecklenburger Landwein

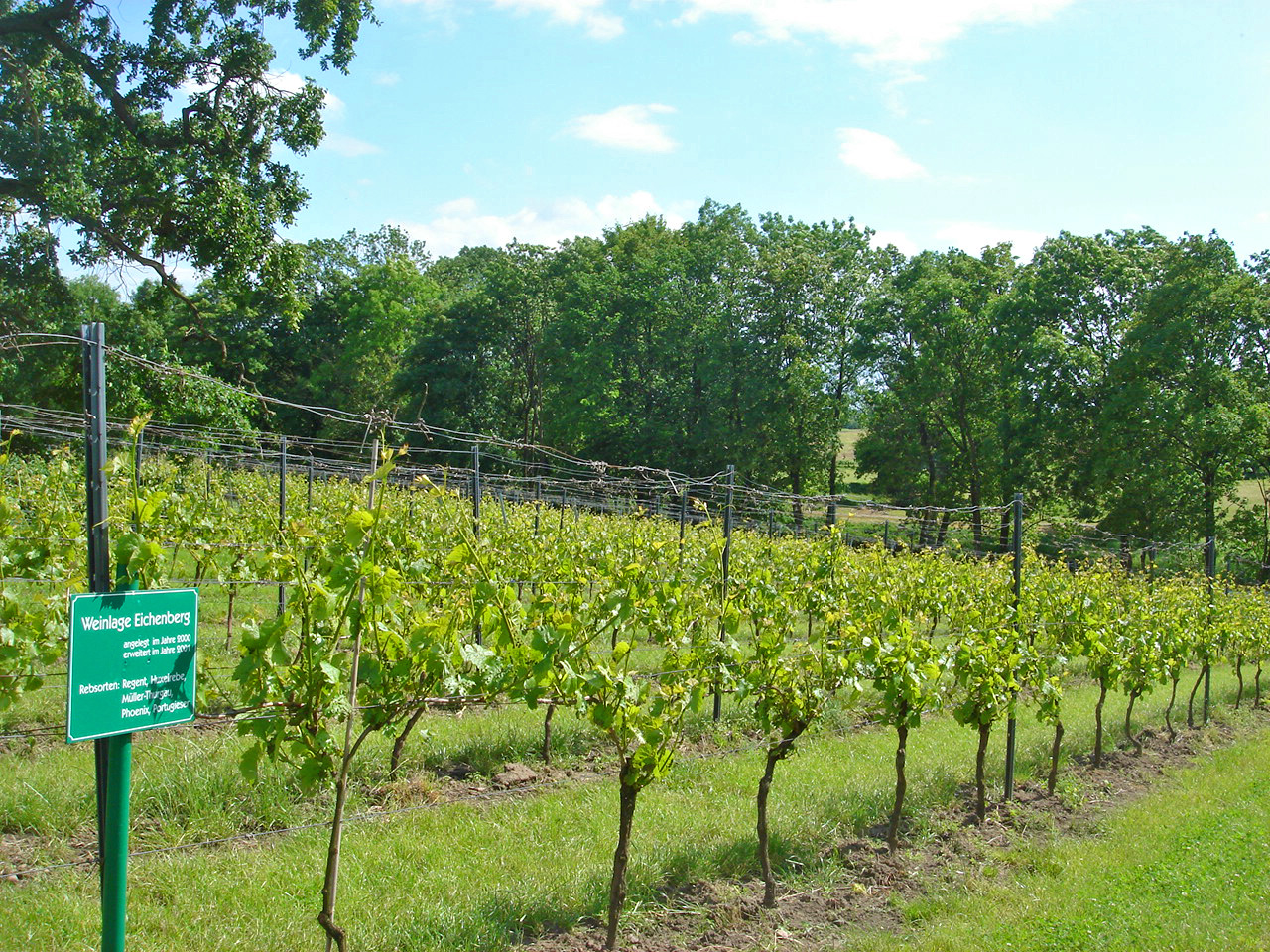
Vineyards at Rattey manor

Stargarder Land is a small region for country wine in northeastern Germany, which was defined in an amendment to the German wine law on 4 March 2004. Located in Mecklenburg-Vorpommern, approximately 100 km north of Berlin, it is by far the northernmost official wine-growing area of Germany. The designation Mecklenburger Landwein is used for country wines from this region.

In two respects, Stargarder Land is different from all other wine regions in Germany. First, the 13 well-established German wine regions (usually referred to as Anbaugebiete) are all allowed to produce wine of all quality levels of the German wine classification, while Stargarder Land is only allowed to produce wines belonging to the lower part – Tafelwein (table wine) and Landwein (country wine) – and not the higher "quality wine" categories Qualitätswein bestimmter Anbaugebiete (QbA) and Prädikatswein. Since the name of the wine region is always displayed prominently on the labels of German quality wines, but not the lesser categories, this is a significant difference. Second, Stargarder Land is only 3.7 hectares (9.1 acres) in size, which would be small even for a single vineyard site in other regions. The smallest of the 13 regions for quality wine is Saxony, which in 2006 had 416 hectares (1,030 acres) of vineyards, and the largest was Rheinhessen with 26,281 hectares (64,940 acres). Thus, Stargarder Land is something of a newly created oddity in the German wine regulations, and the region is generally not considered as Germany's 14th Anbaugebiet, but rather as a smaller district which leads its own existence outside the regions.

The region's wine is produced by two small winemaking cooperatives, one in Rattey (Schloss Rattey) operating 3.5 hectares (8.6 acres) and one in Burg Stargard on 0.2 hectares (0.49 acres). The amount of wine produced is so small that it is not sold commercially, but rather handed out as dividend to the members of the cooperatives.

== Grape varieties ==
Seven grape varieties are allowed in the region: Blauer Portugieser, Blauer Spätburgunder, Huxelrebe, Müller-Thurgau, Phoenix, Ortega and Regent. Approximately two-thirds of the production consists of red wine varieties. The 2008 statistics recorded rounded-off figures of 1 hectare (2.5 acres) each for Ortega, Phoenix and Regent, and less than 1 ha for the other four allowed varieties.

== History ==
The region is said to have 800 years of wine growing history, although presumably on a smaller scale most of this time, since professional viticulture in the region apparently dates from 1853. Documentation of a viticultural tradition was necessary in order to be defined as a wine region in 2004.

The modern history of the region takes its beginning in 1999, when an association of "private winemakers" in Rattey was formed. In 2001, the Agricultural ministry of Mecklenburg-Vorpommern was petitioned to grant Stargarder Land official status.

Because of the "wine lake", the European Union operates a system of planting rights to vineyards, where new vineyards are only allowed if planting rights are transferred from another vineyard where the vines are ripped up. The EU applies this system to each member state, and in the German implementation of this system, the planting rights have been divided out by the federal German government to the German wine-growing states. This meant that Mecklenburg-Vorpommern didn't have any planting rights, and only could acquire such rights if they were transferred from another state. As a solution, Rhineland-Palatinate, where over 60% of the German vineyard surface (or over 60,000 ha) is situated, gave up 3.7 hectare of its planting rights. Thus, under present wine regulations, Stargarder Land is prohibited from growing in size.
