= Federweisser =

Alcoholic beverage

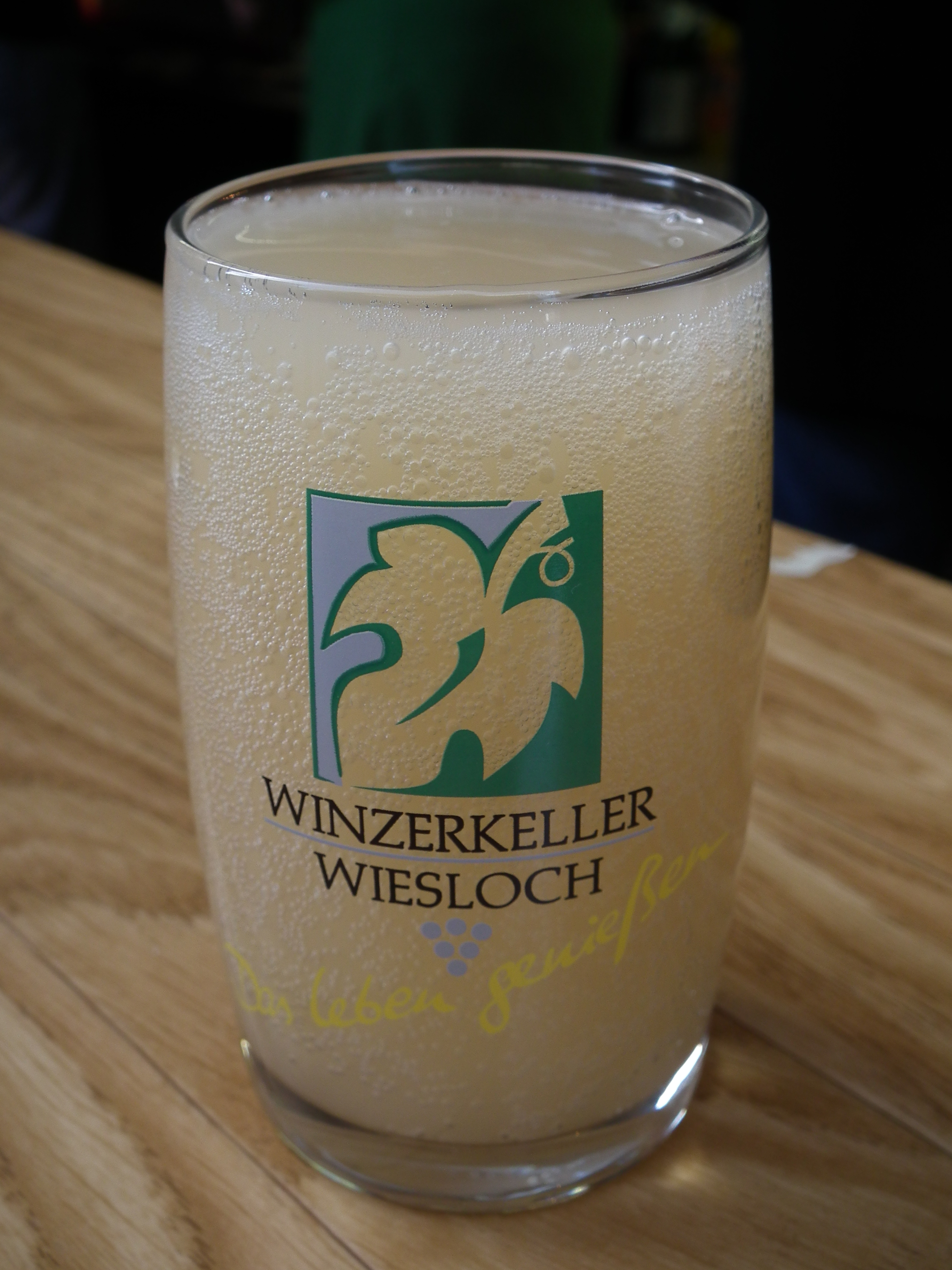
Federweißer from Baden

Federweisser (also Federweißer)^{[A]} is an alcoholic beverage commonly made in continental Europe. It is the product of fermented freshly pressed grape juice, known as must. The term Federweisser in principle includes all stages of fermentation, from must to finished wine. It is typically 9% alcohol by volume, although versions of up to 13.5% alcohol by volume are not uncommon. In contrast to all other alcoholic beverages, the alcohol content stated on a bottle of Federweisser is inconclusive, and presents an uppermost limit, not the actual content at any given time.

Across Europe, it is known as Suser, Sauser, Neuer Süßer ('sweet' or 'new sweet'), or Junger Wein ('young wine') in Southwest Germany, Switzerland and South Tyrol, Fiederwäissen in Luxembourg, Sturm ('storm') in Austria, Federweißer in Bavaria, Neuer Wein ('new wine') in the Palatinate, Federweißer in Franconia, burčiak in Slovakia, burčák in Czech Republic, vin bourru or vernache in France, murci or karcos in Hungary, "მაჭარი" (machari) in Georgia, and "մաճառ" (machar) in Armenia.

In Switzerland, the term Federweisser has a different meaning. There, it refers to a white wine made from red grapes, typically pinot noir.

== Differences in the German-speaking world ==
=== Germany ===
In Germany, Federweißer, Neuer Wein and Bitzler are the most common generic terms. Federweißer is made from white grape must, and the Federroter variant is from red grape must. The next stage before the finished fermented wine is called young wine for all grape varieties.

Around the middle of the 19th century, the German Dictionary of the Brothers Grimm suggested that the name Federweißer was derived from the old term Federweiß for alum, which was previously added to wine as a preservative. However, as such agents are only added at later stages of maturation, it is now assumed that the yeast cells, which Federweißer contains as a suspended matter as any partially fermented grape must, gave it its name due to its feather(Feder)-white(Weiss) colour. In German, the word is declined like "der Weiße", i.e. “man trinkt den Federweißen”.

=== Austria ===
In Austria, the terms Federweißer, Federroter, Neuer Wein and Bitzler are not used. According to Austrian wine law, partially fermented grape must, regardless of colour, be called Sturm and there are several regional specialities with their own names:

In Styria, the cloudy pink to violet-coloured Schilchersturm is produced. This partially fermented grape must is made from the Blauer Wildbacher grape variety, which is traditionally used to make the rosé wine Schilcher.

In eastern Austria, a distinction is also made between Staubigen or Gestaubten, which represents the next stage of maturity from Sturm to Heuriger.

In southern Burgenland, Uhudler, a light red to rosé-coloured blended wine made from certain grape varieties, is also offered in its early stages as (white, red or rosé) Uhudlersturm.

In Austria, it is customary not to say "Prost" when drinking the "Sturm". If the grape juice has not yet fermented, "Mahlzeit" or "Krixikraxi" is said instead. Anyone who disregards this must "buy a round" as a punishment. The glasses of the "unbaptised" storm are held in the left hand and not clinked. Only when the grape juice has fully fermented and the wine has been "baptised", which is the case from St Martin's Day (11 November) onwards, may "Prost" be said.

=== Switzerland ===
In Switzerland, both the white and red versions of partially fermented grape must are usually called Sauser. Federweisser does not refer to partially fermented grape must, but to white wine or sparkling wine made from red grapes, i.e. Blanc de Noirs.

== Production ==
=== Grape Varieties ===
In early autumn in particular, some fermented grape must is produced from early-ripening grape varieties such as Bacchus, Ortega or Siegerrebe specifically for consumption at this stage; large-scale producers sometimes also use must from southern Europe, which is delivered in tankers. As autumn approaches and grapes ripen, any grape variety can be used. Red varieties are mainly produced in classic red wine regions such as the Ahr, but also in other wine-growing regions. Early-ripening red varieties such as Pinot Noir Précoce or Dornfelder are particularly suitable.

=== Fermentation ===
Once yeast has been added, grapes begin to ferment rapidly. The sugar contained in the grapes is broken down into alcohol and carbon dioxide (glycolysis). As soon as an alcohol content of four percent has been reached, Federweißer may be sold. It continues to ferment until all the sugar has been broken down and an alcohol content of about ten percent has been reached.

== Marketing ==
Partially fermented grape must can be sold from an alcohol content of around 4%. It continues to ferment until most of the sugar it contains has been converted into alcohol and then has an alcohol content of around 11%.

Due to the rapid progression of fermentation, partially fermented grape must can only be stored for a short time, even when refrigerated and should be used up after a few days. Because new carbon dioxide is constantly being produced, the containers must not be sealed airtight, otherwise they would burst. As the open containers could only be stored upright and fermentation could not be delayed due to a lack of effective cooling, transport over longer distances was not possible in the past. Partially fermented grape must was therefore known almost exclusively in the wine-growing regions.

This is where it is still sold directly by winegrowers on the street today, as well as where most of the early wine festivals took place, some of which are known as "Bitzlerfeste" in the Palatinate, for example. The two largest German events of this kind, at which the partially fermented grape must plays a role alongside the matured grape must and which attract hundreds of thousands of visitors, are the German Grape Harvest Festival in Neustadt an der Weinstraße with the election of the German Wine Queen and the Federweißen Festival in Landau in der Pfalz, at which the new vintage is christened.

Depending on the start of the grape harvest, partially fermented grape must is available in shops and restaurants from the beginning of September to the end of October. By storing harvested grapes in a cool place and processing them later, some winegrowers extend the sales period into November or even December. In Austria, the wine law states that Sturm may be sold from 1 August to 31 December and must have an alcohol content of at least 1%.

== As a beverage ==
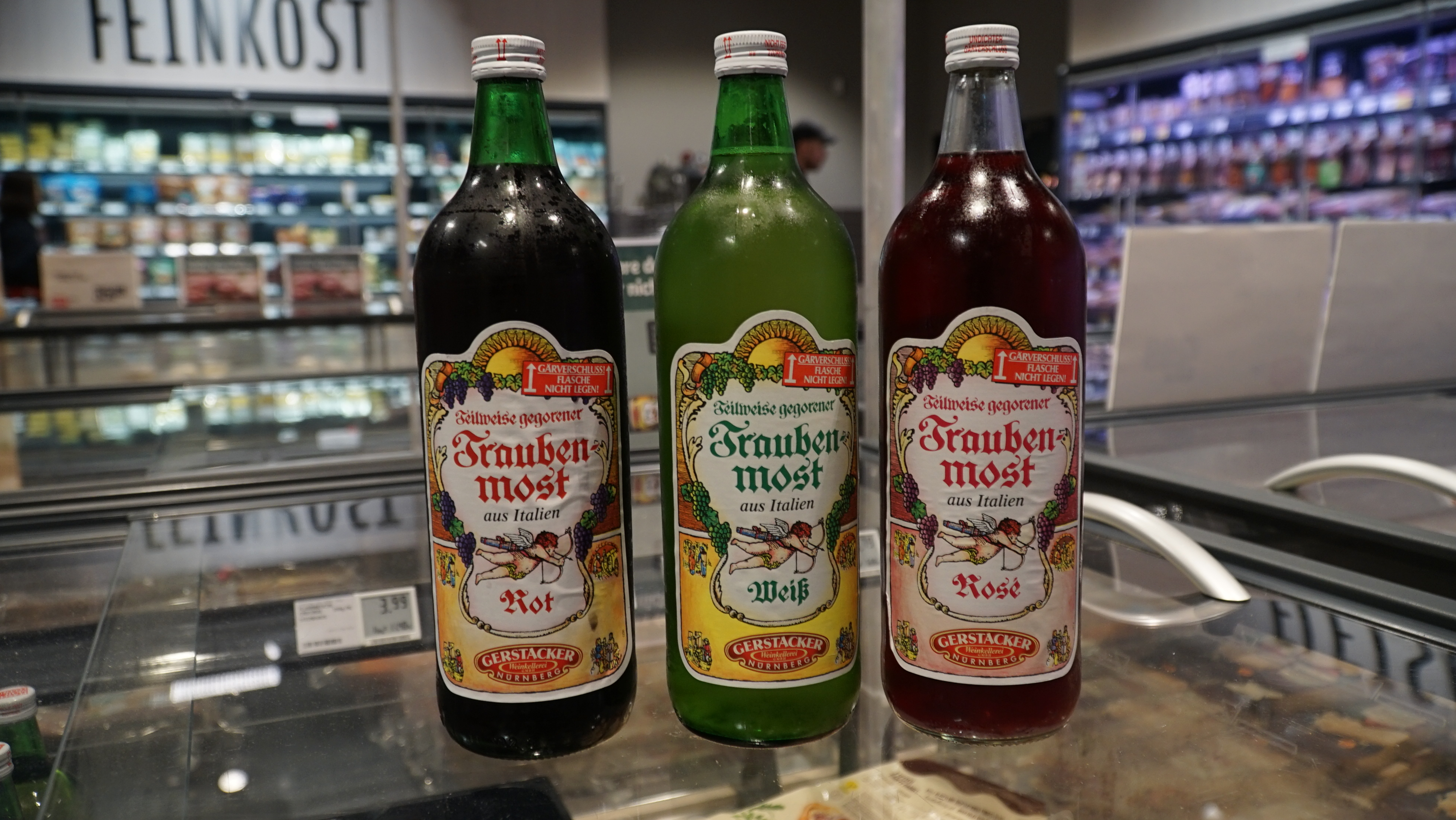
For sale at REWE in Berlin

Due to the carbonation, Federweißer tastes quite refreshing, not unlike a light grape soda or a sweet sparkling wine. As fermentation progresses, however, Federweißer may increasingly assume a darker, often amber-like or light brown hue. In general, Federweißer is made from white grapes; when made from red grapes, the drink is called Federroter, Roter Sauser, or Roter Rauscher. Federroter is less common than Federweißer. Because of rapid fermentation, Federweißer can not be stored for long and should be consumed within a few days of purchase. As carbonic acid is constantly produced, the bottles can not be sealed airtight and have a permeable lid (they would burst otherwise). They must be stored in an upright position to allow the gas to continuously escape from the bottle and to prevent spilling. Federweißer also contains lactic acid bacteria and a high proportion of vitamins B1 and B2. It has a strong effect on the function of the intestine, especially on its peristalsis.

Depending on the date of the grape harvest, it is available from early September to late October, and is generally served together with savoury food. The classic combination is Federweißer and Zwiebelkuchen, although Federweißer and chestnuts is also popular.. In the south-western part of Germany and neighboring Alsace, it is accompanied by Flammkuchen.

Federweißer contains yeast, lactic acid bacteria, and a large amount of vitamin B_{1} and B_{2}.

== See also ==
- Nouveau

== Notes ==
A.From German Feder, "feather", and weiß, "white"; from the appearance of the suspended yeast.
