= Optima (grape) =

Variety of grape

- Grape (Vitis)
- Color of berry skin: Blanc
- Species: Vitis vinifera
- Also called: Geilweilerhof 33-13-113
- Origin: Palatinate, Germany
- VIVC number: 8791

Optima is a white wine grape that was created by viticulturalist Peter Morio at the Geilweilerhof Institute for Grape Breeding in the Palatinate in 1930. Morio crossed a Riesling x Silvaner cross with Müller-Thurgau. The Riesling x Silvaner is sometimes mentioned as Rieslaner, but more often just as "a Riesling x Silvaner". Due to the random element of genetic recombination involved in sexual reproduction of plants, no two crosses of the same parent grape varieties will be identical, so there is a difference between the Riesling x Silvaner cross Rieslaner, and each other such cross.

Optima received varietal protection and was released for general cultivation in 1970 and 1971, respectively. Its name is derived from the Latin language word for "the best".

Optima ripens very early, even before other varieties which are considered as early ripening, such as Müller-Thurgau. Its late budding made it popular in the Mosel region, since it thus was less prone to frost damage. It can also grow on poor sites, where more demanding grape varieties such as Riesling do not ripen very reliably. It also easily achieves very impressive must weights, resulting in its use as a booster of Prädikat levels and sweetness in cheap German blended wines, primarily in Rheinhessen and Mosel. This use is similar to the variety Ortega.

Varietal wines made from Optima grapes are usually yellow-green in colour, can show aromas similar to Riesling, but are lower in acidity. For this reason they have been described as "flabby and undistinguished", and as mentioned above, primarily used in blends.

German plantings of Optima peaked at 420 hectares (1,000 acres) in 1990, but in similarity with many other new breeds of white German grapes, Optima has lost popularity in recent years. It is now grown on less than 100 hectares (250 acres) of vineyards in Germany. The remaining plantations are found primarily in Mosel and Rheinhessen.

It is known under the synonyms (breeding codes) Geilweilerhof 33-13-113 and Gf. 33–13–113.

Optima was used in a crossing to produce the grape variety Orion.
