= Freisamer =

Variety of grape

- Grape (Vitis)
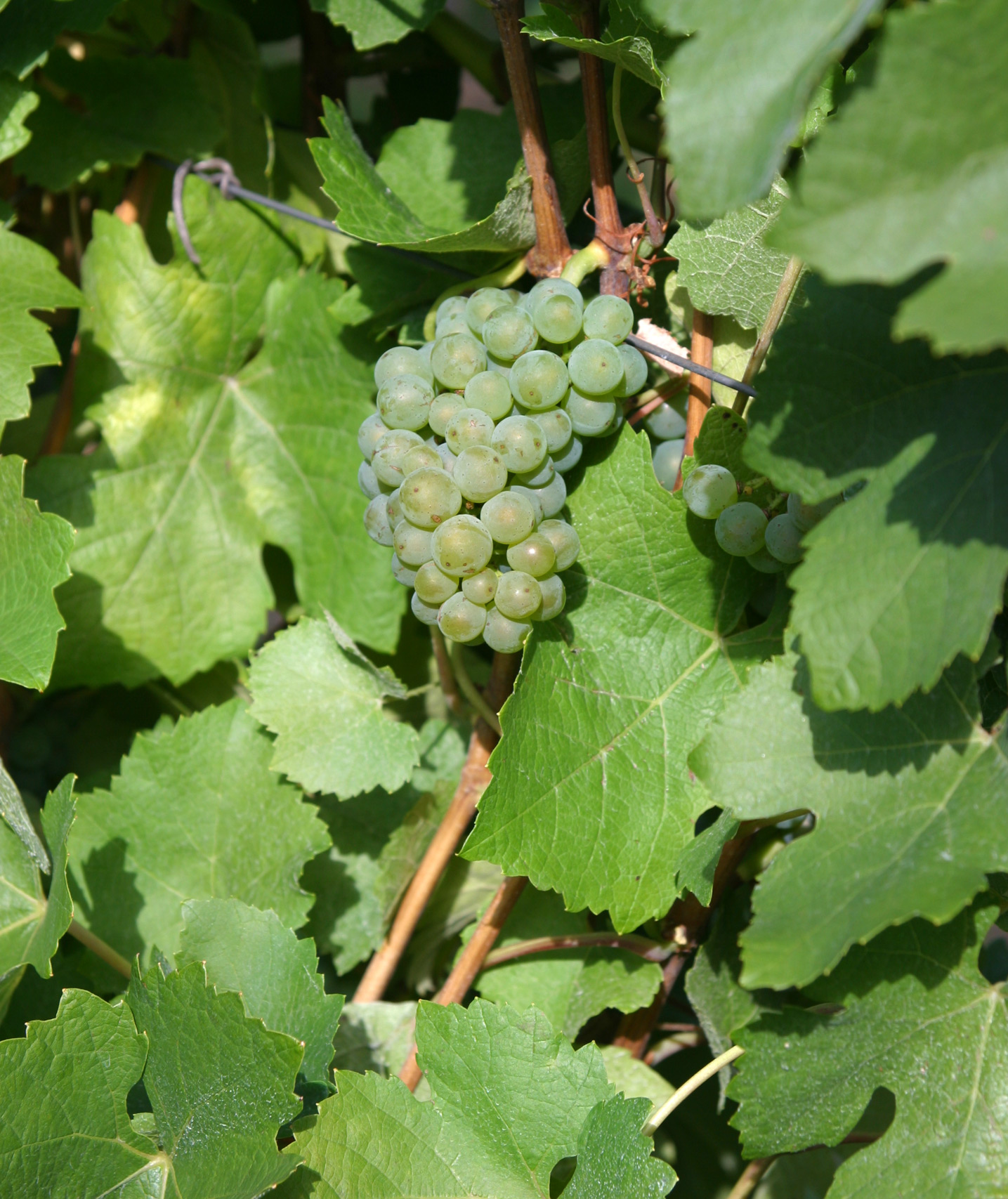
- Freisamer grapes
- Color of berry skin: Blanc
- Species: Vitis vinifera
- Also called: see below
- Origin: Germany
- VIVC number: 4257

Freisamer is a white German wine grape variety grown primarily in the Baden region with some plantings in eastern and western Switzerland. The variety was created in 1916 by Karl Müller at the Staatliches Weinbauinstitut in Freiburg im Breisgau, Germany by crossing Pinot gris and Silvaner. The purpose of the crossing was to find an improved variety similar to Pinot gris. The name is a contraction of Freiburg and Dreisam, the river that runs through Freiburg.

Freisamer is primarily used to make full bodied sweet wines.

In 2008, there were only 4 hectares (9.9 acres) of Freisamer plantations in Germany, most of which were in Baden.

== Synonyms ==
Freisamer is also known under its breeding code Freiburg 25-1 or Fr. 25-1 and the synonym Freiburger.
