= Scheurebe =

Variety of grape

- Grape (Vitis)
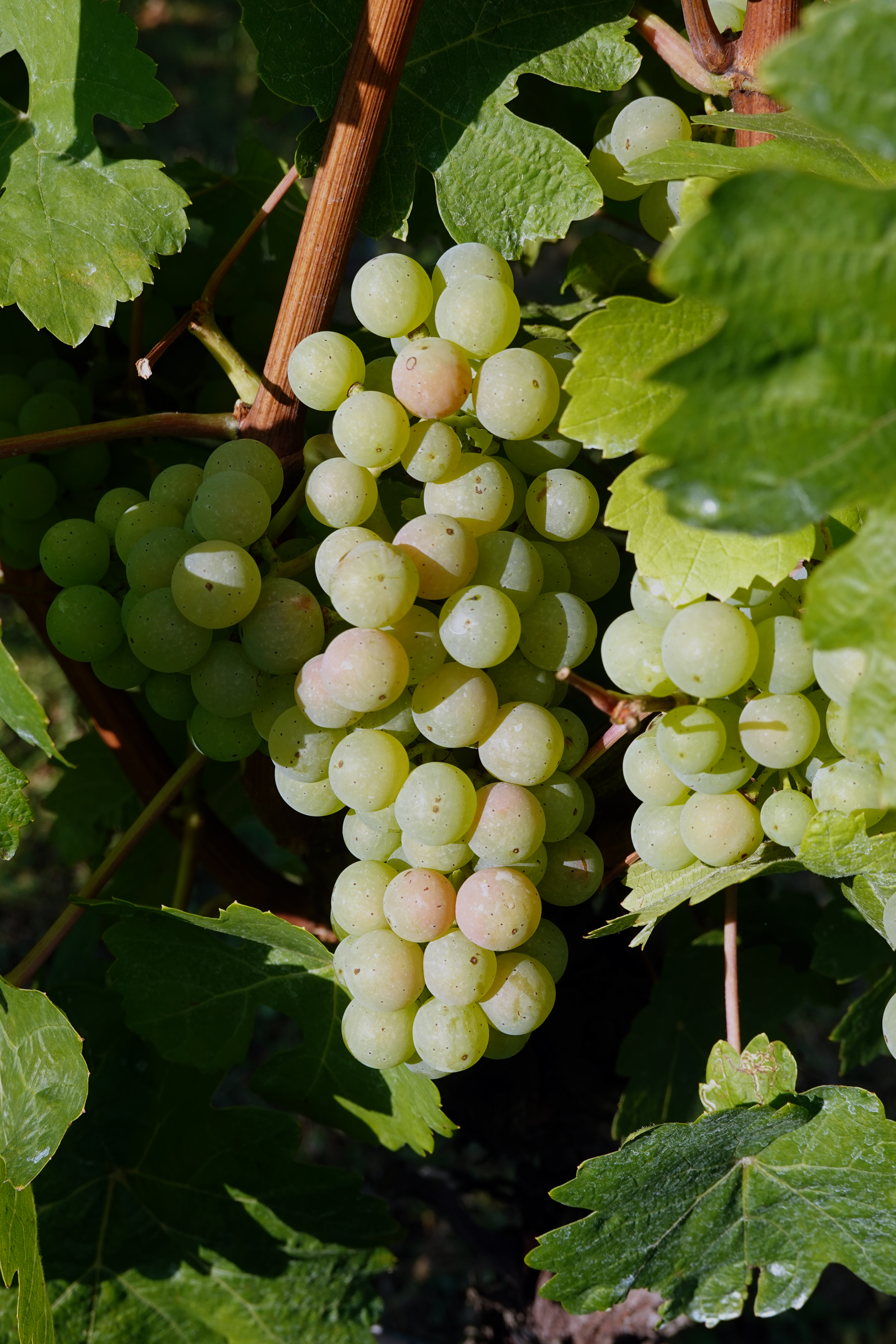
- Scheurebe
- Species: Vitis vinifera
- Also called: Sämling 88, Scheu, Dr. Wagnerrebe
- Origin: Alzey, Germany
- Notable regions: Austria, Germany
- Notable wines: Trockenbeerenauslese from Lake Neusiedl
- VIVC number: 10818

Scheurebe (German pronunciation: [ˈʃɔɪˌʁeːbə]) or Sämling 88 is a white wine grape variety. It is primarily grown in Germany and Austria, where it is often called Sämling 88 (English: Seedling 88), and some parts of the New World. Scheurebe wines are highly aromatic, and the variety is often used for sweet wines, although dry Scheurebe wines have become more common in Germany.

== History and parentage ==
Scheurebe was created by German viticulturalist Dr. Georg Scheu (1879–1949) in 1916, when he was working as director of a grape-breeding institute in Alzey in Rheinhessen, by crossing Riesling with an unknown wild vine. According to the German grape-breeder Helmut Becker, Scheu's purpose was to create a superior version of Silvaner, with more aroma and greater resistance to frost damage and chlorosis. It was long assumed that Scheurebe was Silvaner x Riesling, but DNA analysis in the late 1990s ruled out Silvaner as a parent, while confirming Riesling as the father. It is known that Scheu was working on wild vines, so it is possible that a misidentification of the cross took place. According to official Austrian sources it is in fact a cross between Riesling and Bouquet Blanc (Bukettraube).

Seedling (in German Sämling) number 88 was simply Scheu's serial number for the vine plant selected for its properties. It was named in Scheu's honour in 1945. The Rebe suffix is simply the German word for vine. Scheurebe received varietal protection and was released for general cultivation in Germany in 1956, after Scheu's death.

== Varietal character ==
When produced from fully ripe grapes, Scheurebe wines are dominated by rich blackcurrant aromas supplemented by grapefruit. Well-made dry Scheurebe wines can be quite full-bodied, but dry wines made from not fully ripe grapes tend to be dominated by the grapefruit component, and display it in an aggressive manner which makes for a clumsy, unattractive wine. Scheurebe therefore tends to be easier to use for sweet wines made from grapes that are fully ripe, overripe or affected by noble rot. Well-made sweet Scheurebe wines can show intense aromas of blood grape and honey.

It has been pointed out that Scheurebe retains quite a bit of Riesling character, although it is somewhat less acidic and can tend to be more clumsy. Just as Riesling, its wines tend to show terroir variation, and it has been called the single new breed variety of German origin that deserves serious attention for the quality of its wines.

== Scheurebe in various regions ==
=== Germany ===
In 2018, there were 1,412 hectares (3,490 acres) of Scheurebe in Germany, or 1.7% of the total vineyard surface. Plantings are most common in Palatinate, Rheinhessen and Nahe. The trend for planted area is decreasing, just as for all other German white "new breeds" since the 1980s. It is possible that the reason for Scheurebe's continued decline, despite being appreciated by many international wine critics, is because it is associated with sweet wines while there has been a large-scale move to dry wines in some German regions where Scheurebe has been commonly planted. While overall German plantations of Scheurebe has continued to decrease, some top estates in the Palatinate have in fact reintroduced small amounts of Scheurebe in their vineyards from the mid-1990s.

=== Austria ===
In Austria, the variety is found primarily in Burgenland and Styria, but the total amount of Scheurebe cultivated is much smaller than in Germany. It is however used for some highly rated sweet wines, such as concentrated noble rot-affected Trockenbeerenauslesen in the Neusiedlersee region, where producers include Alois Kracher.

=== Other locations ===
Some Scheurebe is grown in California, Oregon, Western Australia, and Nova Scotia, Canada. It has also recently been introduced in Switzerland where it is cultivated by a handful of wine-growers in Geneva.

== Synonyms ==
Synonyms for Scheurebe include Alzey S. 88, Dr. Wagnerrebe, S 88, Sämling, Sämling 88, Scheu, Scheu 88 and Scheu Riesling.
