= Perle (grape) =

Variety of grape

- Grape (Vitis)
- Color of berry skin: Rose
- Species: Vitis vinifera
- VIVC number: 9159

Perle is a white German wine grape planted primarily in Franconia. The grape is a crossing of Gewürztraminer and Müller-Thurgau. As a varietal, Perle produces highly aromatic wines.
