= Kanzler (grape) =

Variety of grape

- Grape (Vitis)
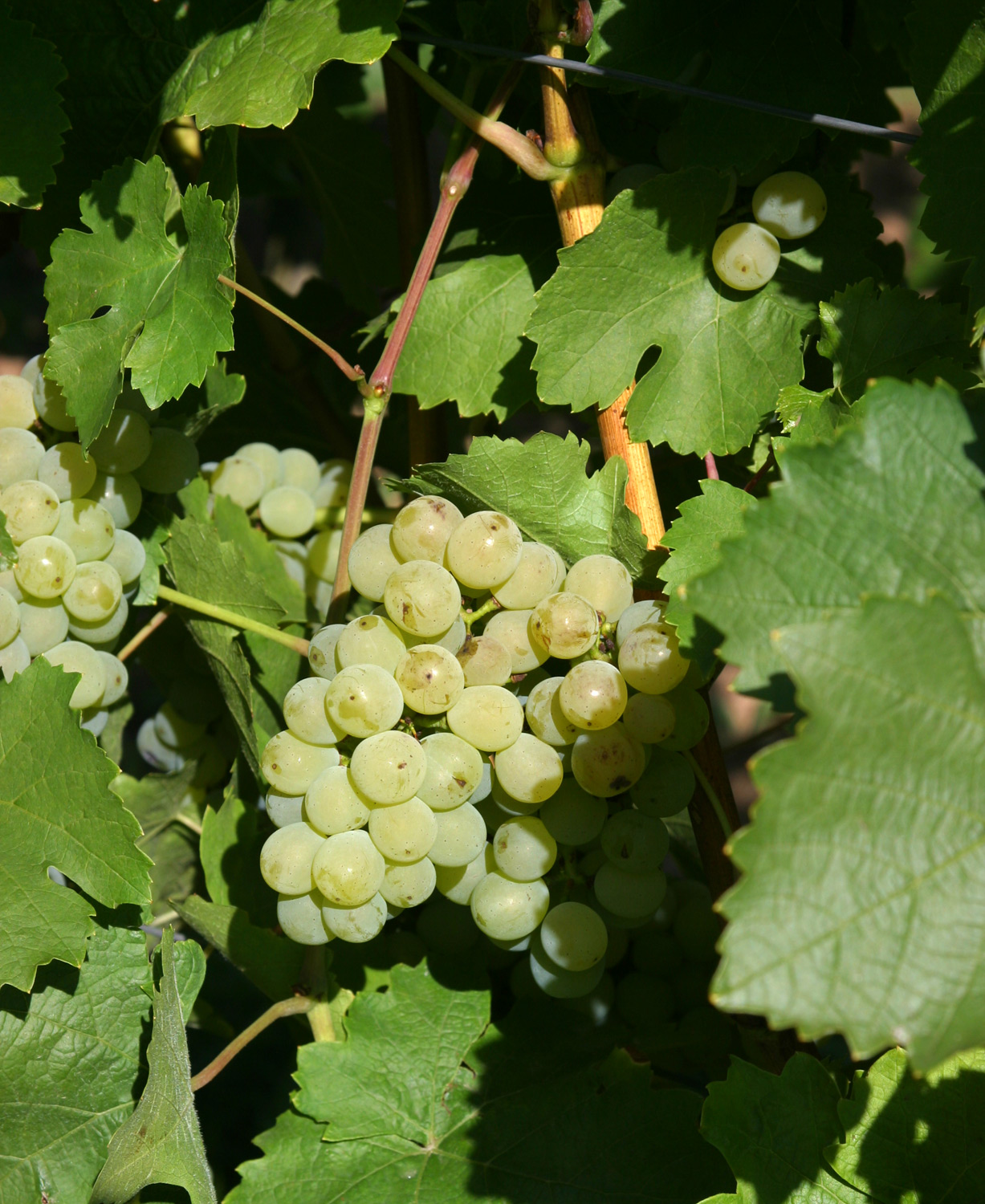
- Kanzler grapes
- Color of berry skin: Blanc
- Species: Vitis vinifera
- Origin: Germany
- Notable regions: Rheinhessen
- VIVC number: 5962

Kanzler is a white German wine grape variety that was produced in the city of Alzey as a crossing of Müller-Thurgau and Silvaner. Today it is primarily grown in the Rheinhessen where it is valued for the high must weights that the grapes can achieve. However, the grape is very sensitive to terroir and vineyard site selection with a tendency to produce very low yields in unfavorable locations.
