= Huxelrebe =

Variety of grape

- Grape (Vitis)
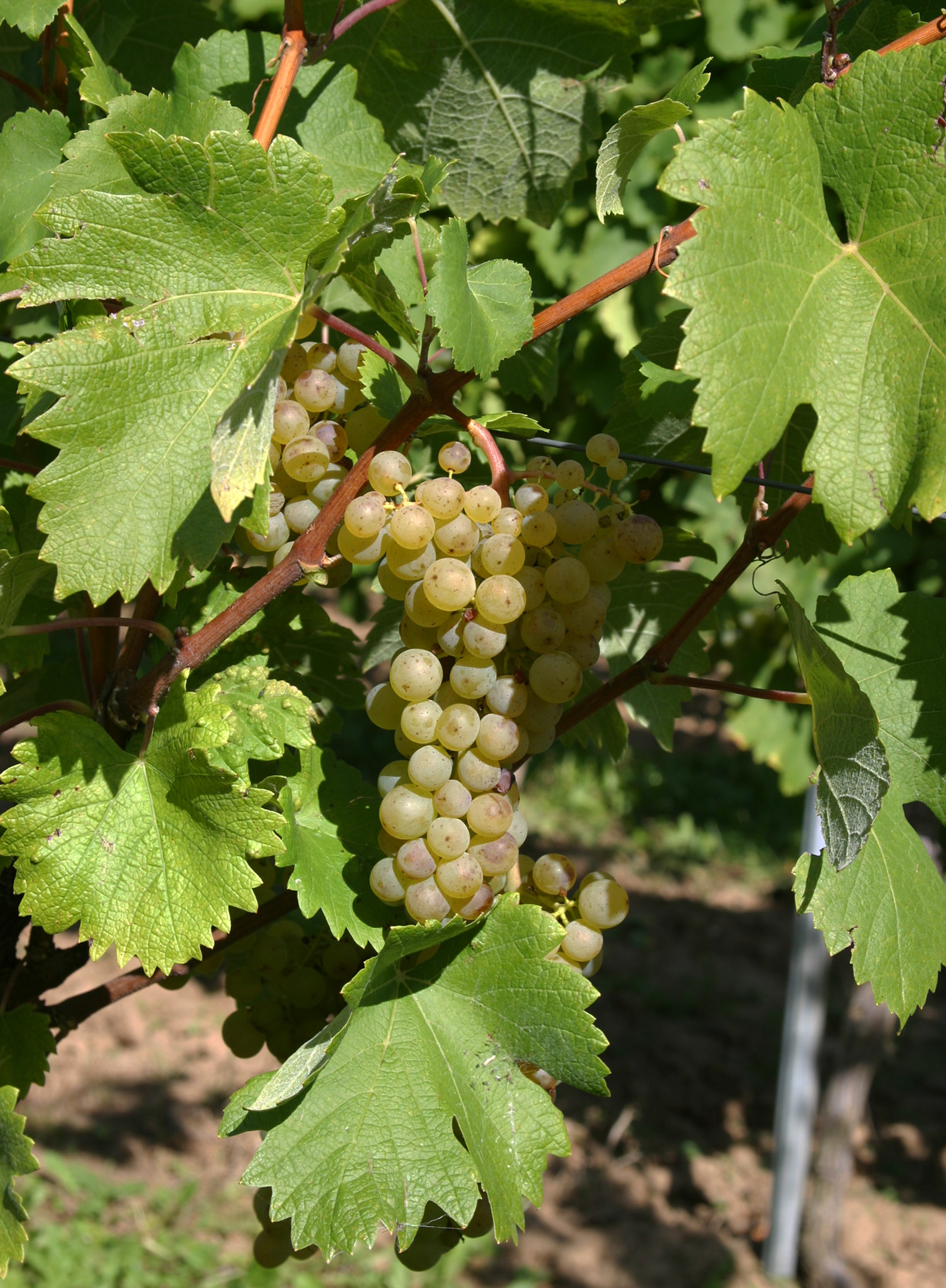
- Huxelrebe grapes
- Color of berry skin: Blanc
- Species: Vitis vinifera
- Also called: Alzey S 3962
- Origin: Alzey, Germany
- VIVC number: 5463

Huxelrebe is a white grape used for wine. Huxelrebe is primarily found in Germany, where the cultivated area covered 396 hectares (980 acres) in 2019, with a decreasing trend. It is primarily found in the German wine regions Rheinhessen, Palatinate and Nahe. Small plantations are also found in England.

== Properties ==
Huxelrebe is a very high-yielding variety which ripens early. If yields are controlled, it can make very high-quality wines, primarily sweet wines as an apéritif or dessert wine, and it usually can reach Auslese ripeness even in a lesser year. The wines tend to be high in acidity and have aromas of rhubarb. Higher-end Huxelrebe wines made from riper grapes often have muscat-like aromas in addition.

== History and parentage ==
Huxelrebe was created by German viticulturalist Dr. Georg Scheu (1879-1949) in 1927, when he was working as director of a grape-breeding institute in Alzey in Rheinhessen, by crossing Gutedel (Chasselas) with Courtiller Musqué (Muscat Précoce de Saumur). It received varietal protection in 1969.

Initially known under its breeding code Alzey S 3962, the variety was named after viticulturalist and nursery owner Fritz Huxel (1892-1972), who was the first to cultivate it extensively. This took place in the 1950s in Westhofen, Rheinhessen, and Huxel became an important champion of the variety. Huxel won many prizes for his Huxelrebe wines. The Rebe part of the name is German for vine.

== Synonyms ==
Huxelrebe has no other synonyms than its breeding code Alzey S 3962 or AS 3962.
