= Würzer (grape) =

German white wine variety

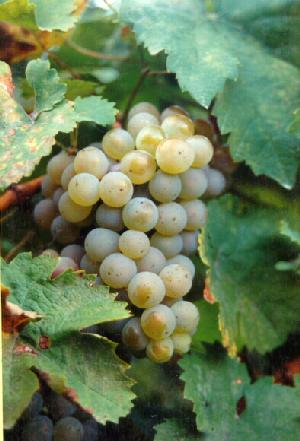
Müller-Thurgau, one of the parent varieties of Würzer.

Würzer is a white German wine grape variety that is a crossing of Gewürztraminer and Müller-Thurgau. The variety was bred at a German viticultural research station in the town of Alzey in 1932 but wasn't commercially planted on a significant scale until the 1980s. Today there are a little over 100 hectares (250 acres) of the variety planted mostly in the Rheinhessen. The grape has a reputation among growers for being a consistent producer with good yields.

== Wine styles ==
According to wine expert Jancis Robinson, Würzer tends to produce "overpowering" wines with noticeable alcohol levels.
