= Siegerrebe =

Variety of grape

- Grape (Vitis)
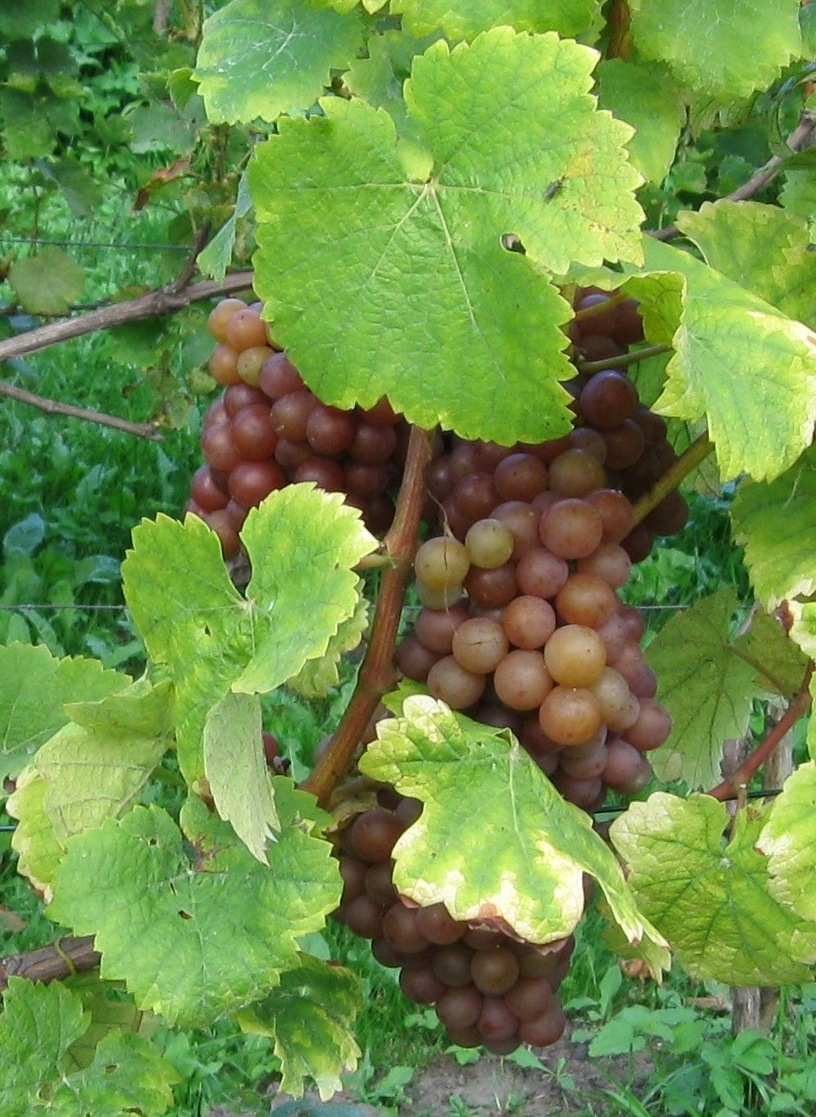
- Color of berry skin: Blanc
- Species: Vitis vinifera
- Also called: Alzey 7957
- Origin: Germany
- Notable regions: Germany, UK and United States
- Notable wines: Varietal wine
- VIVC number: 11781

Siegerrebe (German pronunciation: [ˈziːɡɐˌʁeːbə], lit. 'Victory vine') is a white wine grape that is grown primarily in Germany with some plantings in England, Vancouver Island, Washington state, British Columbia's North Okanagan and Fraser Valley and Nova Scotia's Annapolis Valley along with a small planting in Tasmania, Australia at Every Man and His Dog Vineyard, and another in the Finger Lakes AVA in New York State. Siegerrebe was created by German viticulturalist Dr. Georg Scheu (1879–1949) in 1929 at a grape-breeding institute in Alzey in Rheinhessen, by crossing Madeleine Angevine and Gewürztraminer. However, Georg Scheu's son Heinz Scheu has claimed in a book that Siegerrebe was the result of self-pollination of Madeleine Angevine. Siegerrebe received varietal protection and was released for general cultivation in Germany in 1958.

In 2019, there were 71 hectares (180 acres) of Siegerrebe in Germany with a decreasing trend, in similarity with other "new breeds" of white varieties. In Belgium, it is authorised for all still wine AOCs : Côtes de Sambre et Meuse, Hageland, Haspengouw, et Heuvelland.

== Viticultural characteristics ==
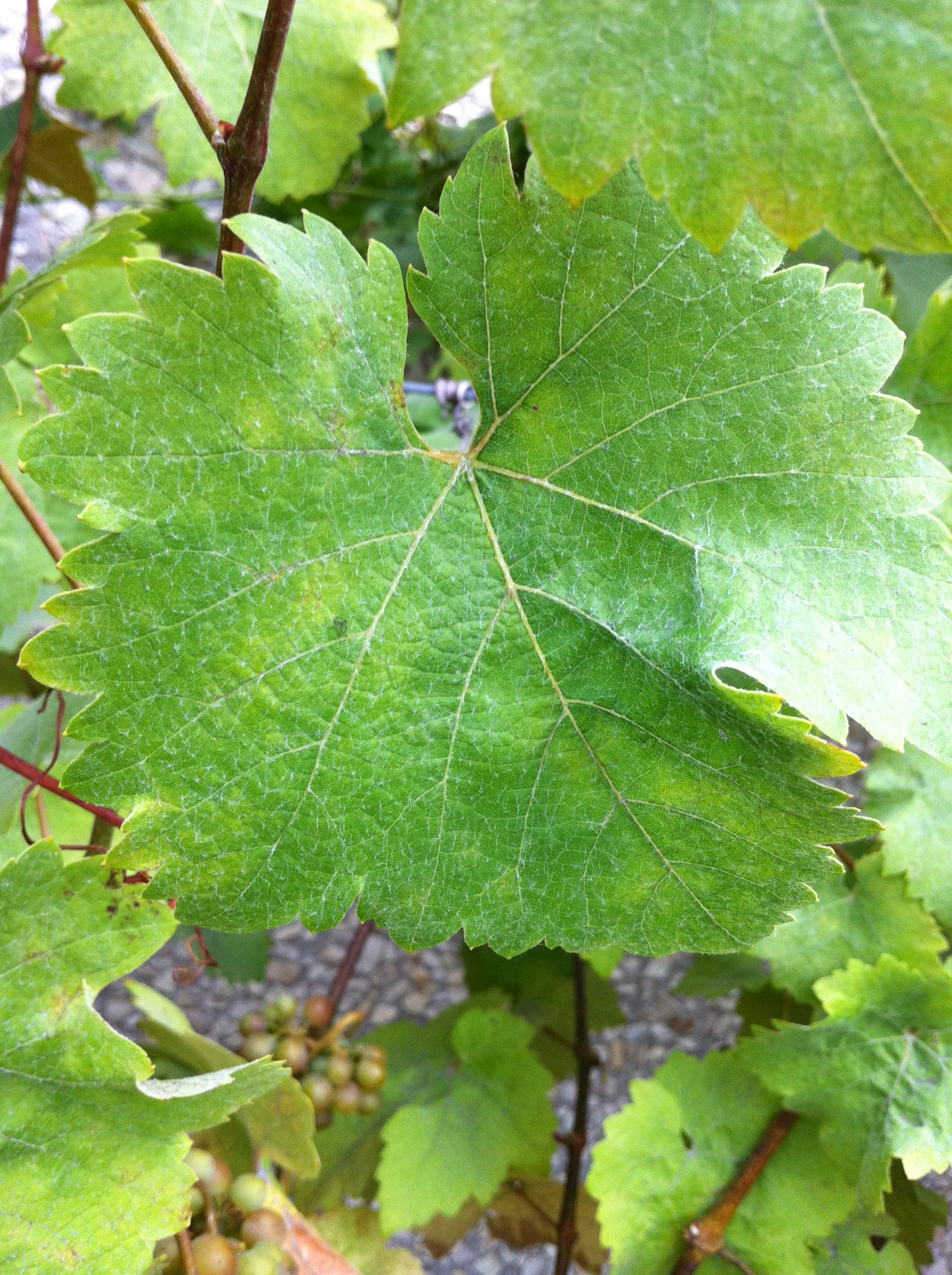
Siegerrebe leaf

The vine is suited to colder climates as bud-burst is late and fruit ripening is very early however due to these traits bird depredation is serious and attack by wasps can be a problem. The vines are fruitful and vigor is low with grape bunches being large, red in colour and loosely packed. It has a susceptibility to chlorosis. Killing temperature of Siegerrebe is −14.4 °F (−25.8 °C).

Siegerrebe easily reaches high must weights and is noted as the record holder for highest must weight recorded in Germany. During the 1971 harvest in the Rheinpfalz, a parcel of Trockenbeerenauslese Siegerrebe recorded 326 Oechsle, which is more than twice the minimum level of ripeness needed for a wine to qualify as Trockenbeerenauslese.

== Siegerrebe wines ==
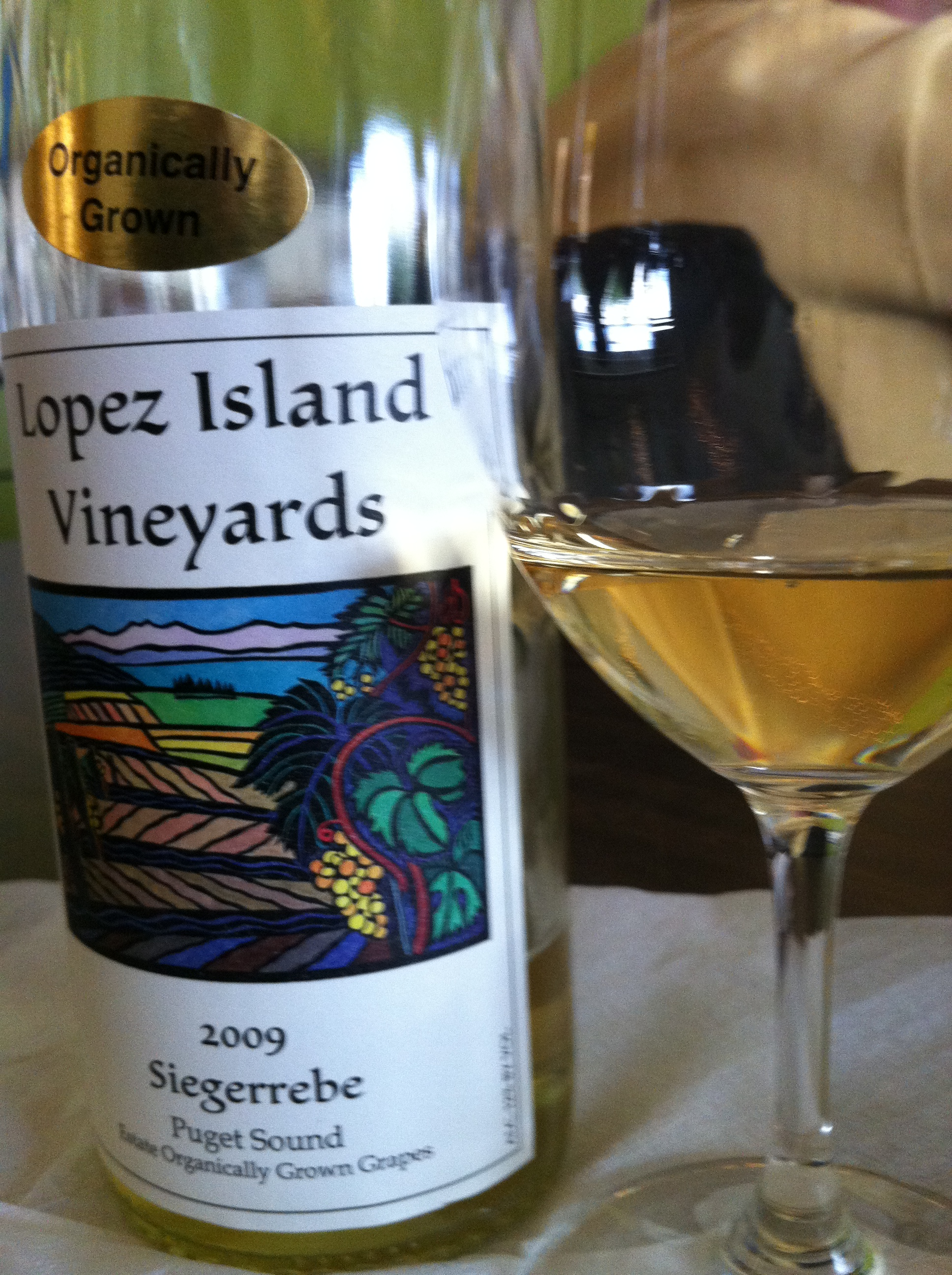
A Siegerrebe made in Washington State.

Despite high must weights the wine tends to be very low in acid. The acid tends to drop rapidly in the grape as ripeness approaches.. The finished wine has an intense aroma reminiscent of Muscat and tends to be used in blending rather than a varietal wine, however the flavour is reminiscent of Gewürztraminer. Many Siegerrebe wines are high in extract and yellow-green to golden yellow in colour. Because Siegerrebe ripens early, it is sometimes used for Federweisser early in the German harvest season. In Washington State, Siegerrebe is grown only on the west side of the Cascade Mountain, in the Puget Sound AVA and in the SW Washington region, with GDD50 ranging in the 1600F-2000F. This is undoubtedly the most popular white grape with the west side growers.

== Synonyms ==
Siegerrebe is also known under the synonyms Alzey 7957, AZ 7957, Scheu 7957 and Sieger.
