= Auslese =

German wine category

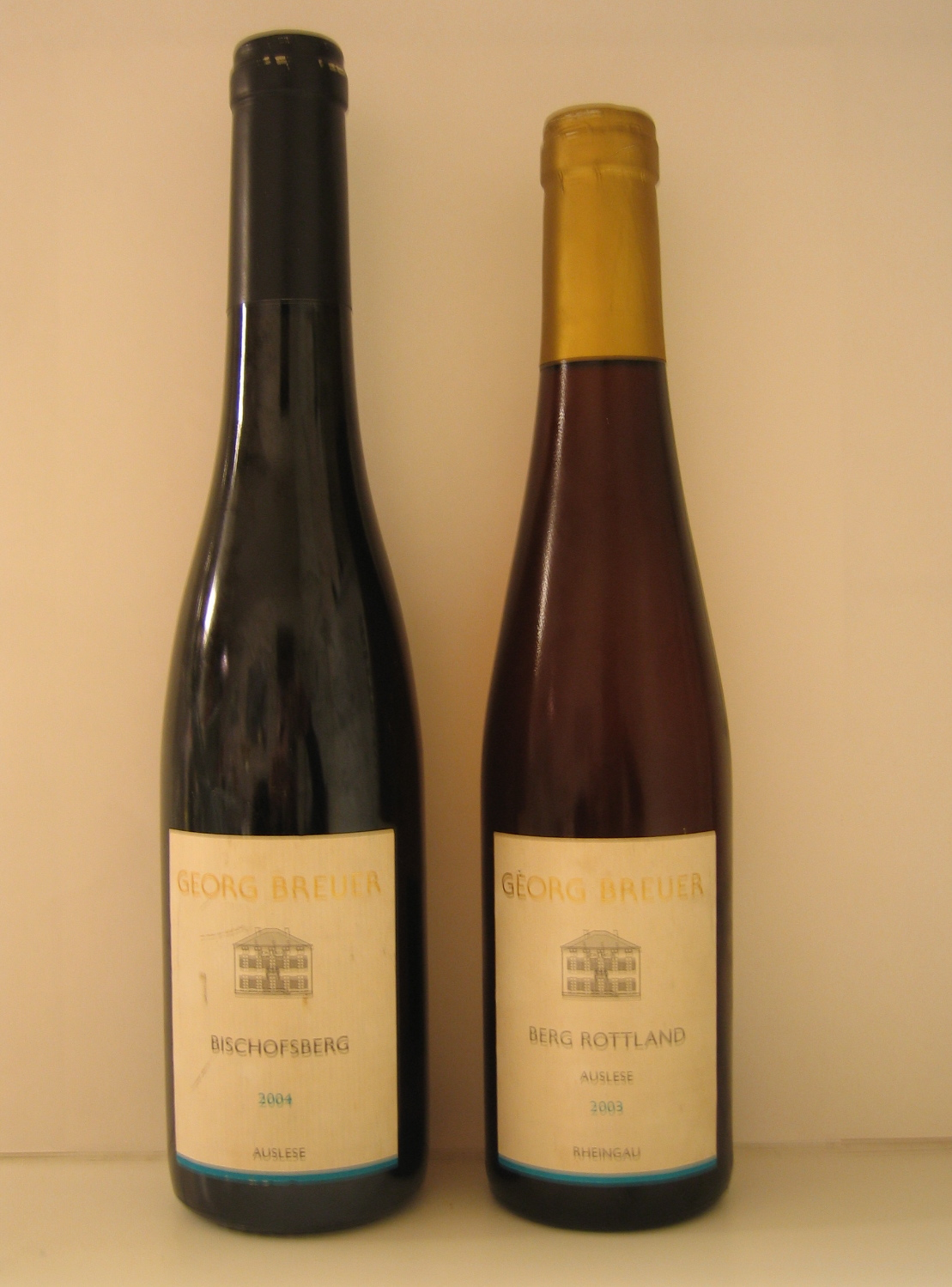
Two bottles of German Riesling Auslese from the same Rheingau producer, one with a gold capsule (Goldkapsel) to denote extra ripeness

Auslese (German: [ˈaʊ̯sˌleːzə], lit. 'selected harvest'; plural form is Auslesen) is a German language wine term for a late harvest wine and is a riper category than Spätlese in the Prädikatswein category of the Austrian and German wine classification.

== Harvest ==
The grapes are picked from selected very ripe bunches in the autumn (late November-early December), and have to be hand-picked. Generally Auslese wine can be made in only the best harvest years that have been sufficiently warm. A small proportion of the grapes may be affected by noble rot in some regions although this never dominates the character of the wine. Rheingau winemaker Schloss Johannisberg is generally credited with discovering Auslese wine in 1787.

Auslesen are sometimes considered a German dessert wine, especially the wines made from botrytis infected bunches, though it is not as sweet as Eiswein, Beerenauslese (BA), or Trockenbeerenauslese (TBA) dessert wines.

Auslesen can be enjoyed by themselves (aperitif – an "afternoon wine") but are usually best accompanied with food, particularly those that exhibit the hearty characteristics of German cuisine.

The term in Alsace most closely corresponding to Auslese in terms of must weight requirements is Vendange tardive, even though this French term is linguistically equivalent to the German term Spätlese.

== Requirements ==
The minimum must weight requirements for Auslese is as follows:

- In German wine, 83 to 100 degrees Oechsle, depending on the region (wine growing zone) and grape variety.
- In Austrian wine, 21 degrees KMW, corresponding to 105 °Oechsle.

Chaptalisation may not be used. The requirements are part of the wine law in both countries. Many producers, especially top-level producers, exceed the minimum requirements by a wide margin, resulting in richer and sweeter Auslesen that may even exceed the minimum requirements for Beerenauslese, the next Prädikat in order. In Germany, it is common to add stars (usually * to ***) on the wine label, Fuder (vat) numbers or a golden capsule, to indicate this.

== Dry Auslese ==
The wines are occasionally made dry (trocken) in some areas, such as Palatinate (Pfalz) but are more typically sweeter, as the very high alcohol levels (around 13-14%) in dry examples can make them unbalanced particularly when young. The typical must weight for an Auslese is 90° Oechsle. These wines, particularly when made from the riesling grape can age for very long periods of time, often ten years or more.

With the recent introduction of the new classifications of top dry German wines, Erstes Gewächs and Grosses Gewächs, the Verband Deutscher Prädikatsweingüter (VDP) has discouraged the continued use of Auslese trocken, as it has been seen as confusing for the consumer to have sweet and powerful dry wines with the same Prädikat. However a significant number of VDP members are still using the Prädikat classification on dry Wines, since the Prädikat only is dedicated to the quality level of the picked grapes and not the taste.

== Red wine Auslese ==
As German winemakers try to carve out a niche in developing red wine, the Auslese ripeness classification has come into play as the ideal level to produce Spätburgunder (Pinot noir), particularly in the Rheingau, Pfalz, and Baden regions. Winemakers are experimenting with grapes at Auslese level ripeness with Burgundian style production methods involving oak and a higher extraction of tannin levels.

These wines are also increasingly labelled Erstes Gewächs and Grosses Gewächs rather than Auslese.
