= Rieslaner =

Variety of grape

- Grape (Vitis)
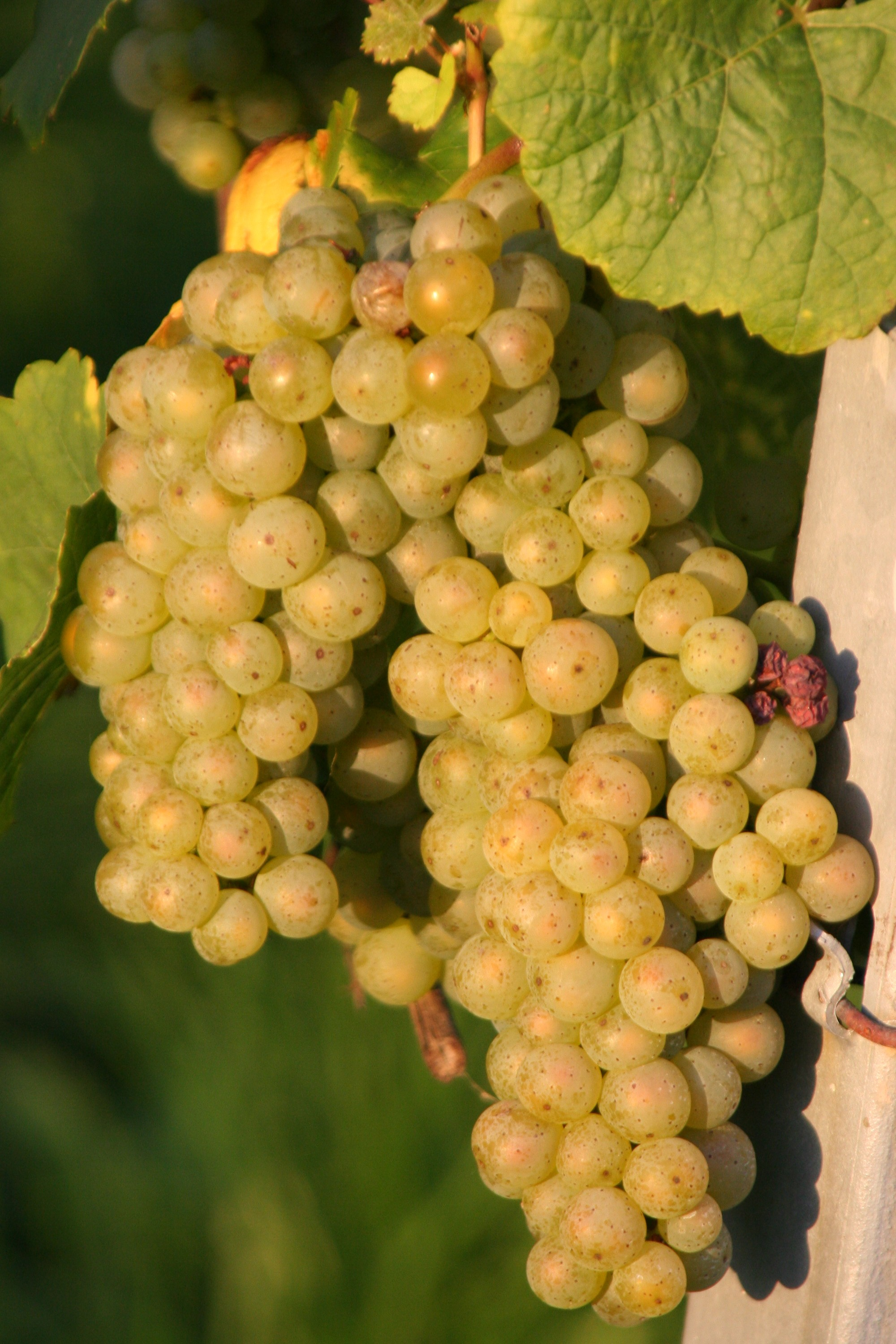
- Rieslaner
- Species: Vitis vinifera
- Also called: Mainriesling, Würzburg N 1-11-17
- Origin: Franconia, Germany
- VIVC number: 10073

Rieslaner is a breed cross of the Silvaner and Riesling grape that was first bred in Veitshöcheim, Franconia, Germany in 1921 by the grape breeder August Ziegler. It is a late ripening grape that is fairly high in acidity. Today it is mostly grown in the Franconia (Franken) region and in the Palatinate (Pfalz) region where the grape is often affected by botrytis. Rieslaner is bred to do well with botrytis, and it holds a lot of potential to form an acidic, fruity, and full yield when it is ripened.
