= European Union wine growing zones =

European Union wine growing zones are used in the common European Union wine regulations to regulate certain aspects of winemaking. The zones differ in terms of climate and examples of what is regulated by wine growing zone are required grape maturity at harvest and allowed levels of chaptalisation. There are 21 wine producing countries in the European Union, with 14 of them having significant levels of production. In the 2004-2005 vintage, total European Union wine production was around 184 million hectoliters (4.8 billion gallons) which accounted for nearly 70% of total worldwide production. Of that total, nearly 55% was classified as table wine with 4% used in the production of grape-based distilled spirits such as Armagnac and Cognac.

The remaining 41% were produced as "quality wine"-wine that produced under one of the quality wine designation in a country's appellation systems such as Germany's QmP & QbA classifications, France's Appellation d'origine contrôlée (AOC), Spain's Denominación de Origen (DO) and Italy's Denominazione di origine controllata (DOC) systems. In 1997, the European Union had over 3.4 million hectare (8.4 million acres) planted under vine which accounted for nearly 44% of the world's wine, table and raisin grape production.

== Wine zones ==
The wine growing zones and the wine regions that belong to them are as follows:

- Zone A (the coldest), comprising Germany except Baden, Luxembourg, Belgium, The Netherlands, United Kingdom, the Čechy region of the Czech Republic and those countries in northern Europe where commercial winemaking is a very marginal business.
- Zone B, comprising Baden in Germany, Austria, the French regions of Alsace, Champagne, Jura, Loire, Lorraine and Savoie and parts of South Moravian Region of the Czech Republic, Poland, Slovakia, Slovenia and Romania.
- Zone C (the warmest), which is subdivided into:
  - Zone C I, comprising the French regions of Bordeaux, Burgundy, Provence, Rhône and Sud-Ouest, some areas in the far north of Italy, some areas in northern Spain, most of Portugal, and parts of Hungary, Poland, Slovakia, and Romania.
  - Zone C II, comprising much of Languedoc-Roussillon in France, most of northern and central Italy, most of northern Spain and parts of Slovenia, Bulgaria and Romania.
  - Zone C III a, comprising parts of Greece, Cyprus and Bulgaria.
  - Zone C III b, comprising small parts close to the Mediterranean coast of France and Corsica, southern Italy and Spain, some parts of Portugal, most of Greece, parts of Cyprus and all of Malta.

In 2008, the division into zones was slightly changed. Previously, the current zone C I had been divided into two zones, C I a and C I b.
