= Ortega (grape) =

Variety of grape

- Grape (Vitis)
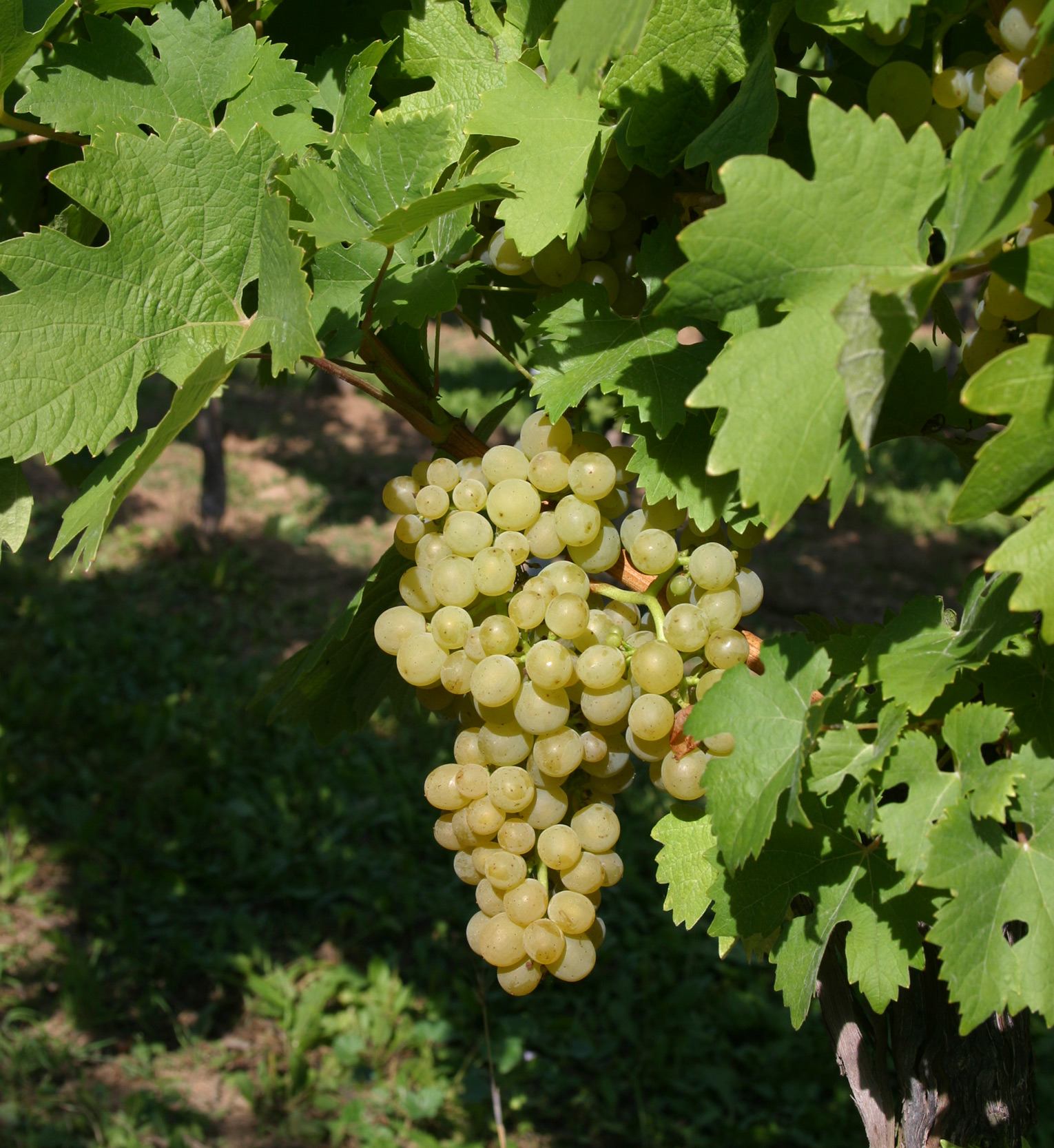
- Color of berry skin: Blanc
- Species: Vitis vinifera
- Also called: Würzburg B 48-21-4
- Origin: Germany
- Notable regions: Rheinhessen
- VIVC number: 8811

Ortega is a grape variety used for white wine. It was created in 1948 by Hans Breider at the Bayerischen Landesanstalt für Wein-, Obst- und Gartenbau in Würzburg and was released with varietal protection in 1981. It is a cross between Müller-Thurgau and Siegerrebe. Breider chose to name the variety in honour of the Spanish poet and philosopher José Ortega y Gasset.

Ortega ripens early, is not sensitive to frost and reaches quite high must weights, typically 20 degrees Oechsle higher than Müller-Thurgau. It is therefore often used for sweet wines, which are considered to improve with cellaring. Ortega wines have aromas of Muscat and peach and are high in extract.

Ortega is also used as a table grape.

In 2016, there were 475 hectares (1,170 acres) of Ortega in Germany, with a decreasing tendency.
