= Bronner (grape) =

Variety of grape

- Grape (Vitis)
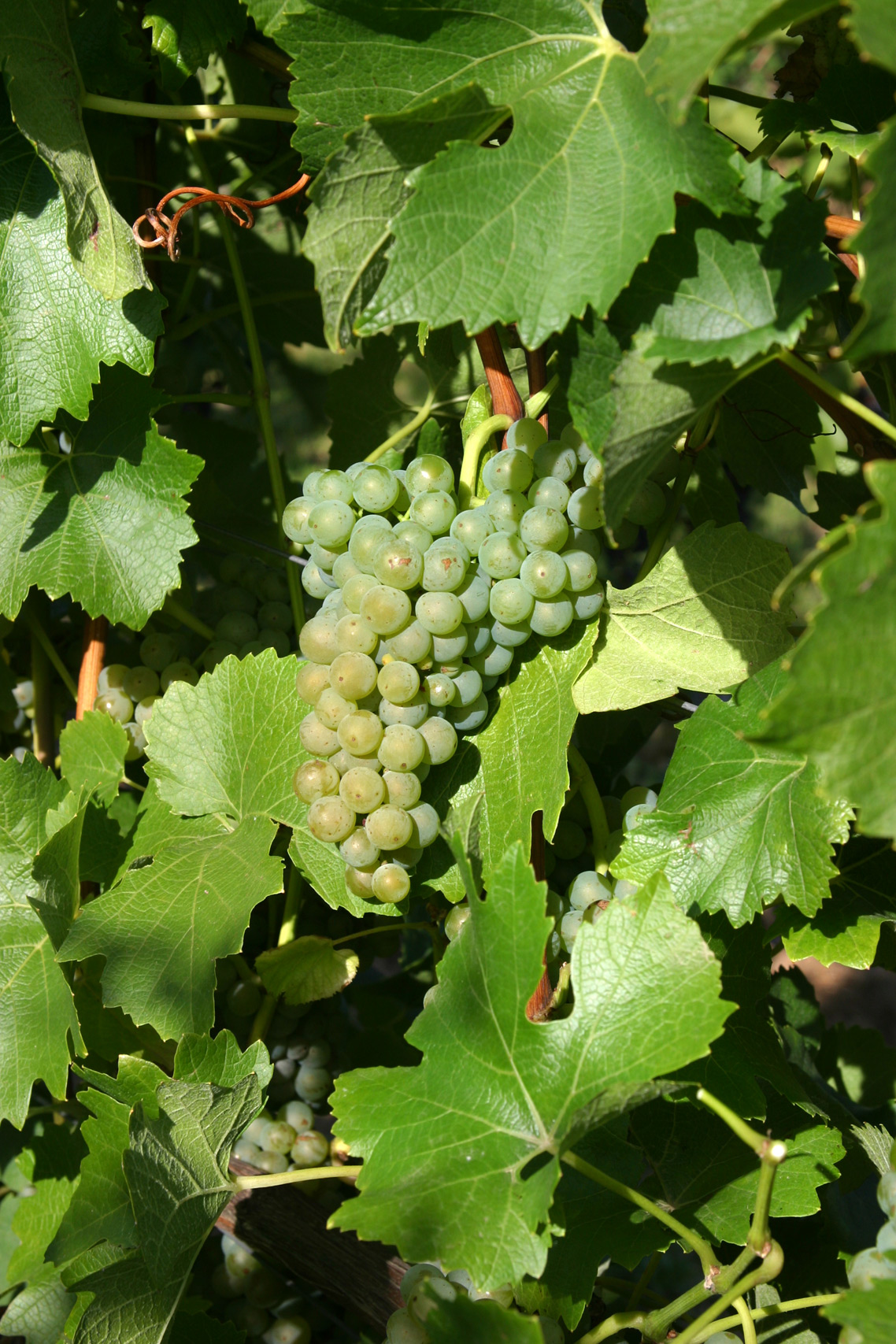
- Bronner grapes
- Color of berry skin: Blanc
- Species: Vitis vinifera, although with some influence of Vitis amurensis in the pedigree
- Also called: FR 250-75
- Origin: Freiburg, Germany
- Notable regions: Germany
- VIVC number: 17129

Bronner is a white grape variety used for wine. It was bred in 1975 by Norbert Becker at the viticultural institute in Freiburg, Germany. The variety was initially known under its breeding code FR 250-75, and was later named in honour of Johann Philipp Bronner (1792-1864), who was a German pharmacist and viticultural pioneer. It received varietal protection in 1977.

Bronner shows good resistance against fungal diseases and is in many respects similar to Pinot blanc.

== Pedigree ==
Becker created Bronner by crossing Merzling (mother vine) and Gm 6494 (father vine). "Gm" is used in breeding codes for grapes from the Geisenheim grape breeding institute, but Gm 6494 was originally created in Czechoslovakia in 1964 by Professor V. Kraus by crossing Zarya Severa and St. Laurent. Kraus offered several of his crosses to Dr. Helmut Becker in Geisenheim, where additional work was carried out, and where his plants were given serial numbers. The grape variety Rondo was created by selecting a Gm 6494 plant with particular properties.

Initially, the father vine of Gm 6494 was thought to be Saperawi Severni, but Becker's successor Volker Jörger and his colleagues were able to identify Zarya Severa instead.

Gm 6494 has an influence of Vitis amurensis in its pedigree, but despite this, Bronner is usually not considered to be a hybrid grape.

== Relationship to other grapes ==
In 1983, Bronner was crossed with Cabernet Sauvignon to create the white wine grape Souvignier gris. In 1996 the red wine grape Divico was obtained through a natural cross of Gamaret with Bronner.

== Synonyms ==
The only synonyms of Bronner are FR 250-75 or Freiburg 250-75.

== Other Bronner variety ==
Confusingly, Bronner is also used as the name of an open pollination variant of Pinot blanc. The Pinot blanc-related Bronner, which is not the same variety as the 1975 German crossing, is known under the synonyms Weiße Bronnertraube and Weiße Gaman. Unlike most cultivated grape varieties, which are dioecious, Bronner/Gaman is monoecious, with only female flowers.
