= Heinrich Birk =

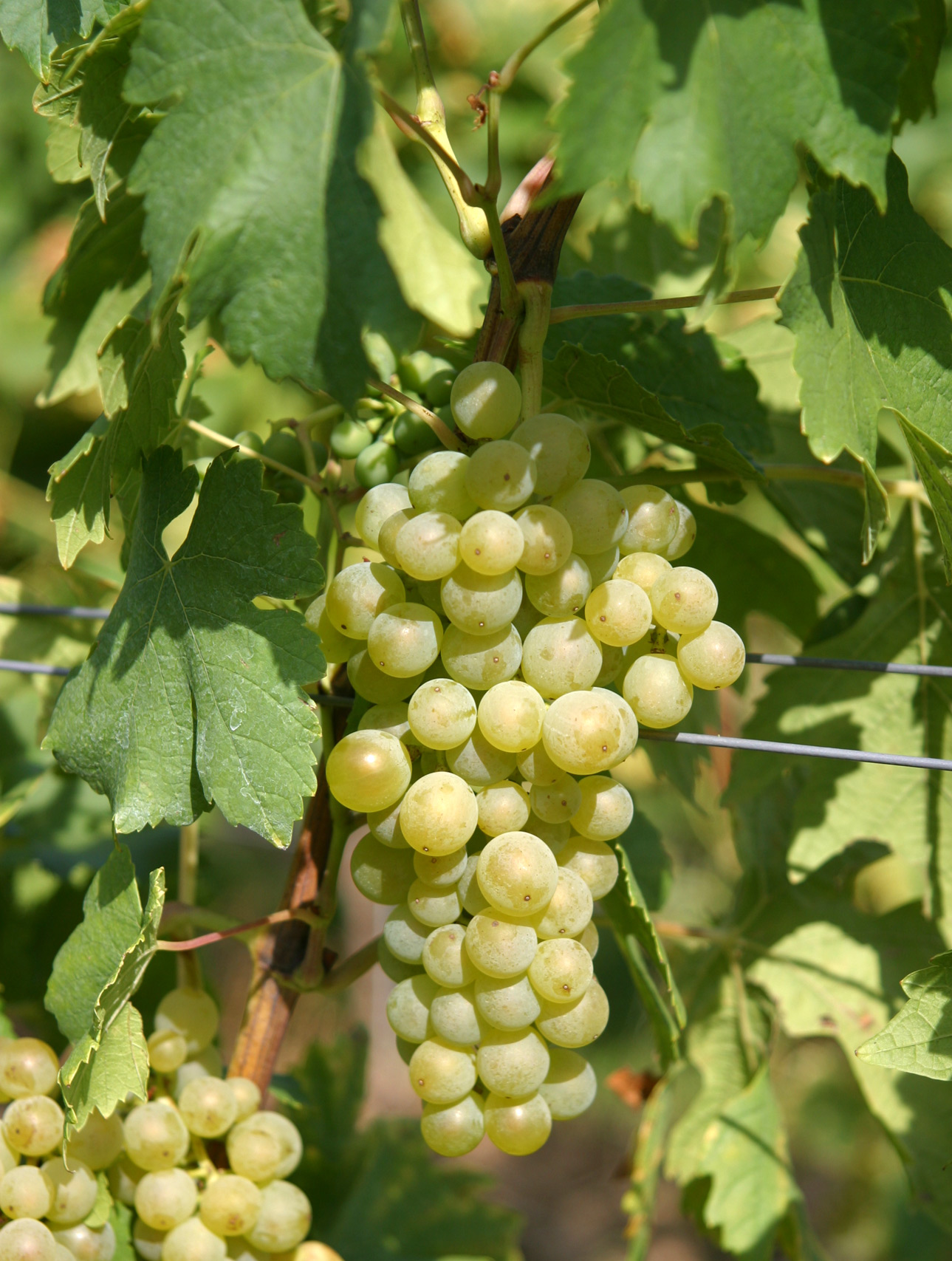
Arnsburger bred by Heinrich Birk

Heinrich Birk (1898 – 1973) was a German viticulturist. He was head of the Geisenheim Grape Breeding Institute, in Geisenheim, in Germany's Rheingau region. Heinrich Birk studied philosophy at the University of Giessen after his initial graduation 1920–1923 in agronomy at the university of Bonn and after 1924 in addition to an initial position on the domain Steinberg, Kloster Eberbach. He received his doctorate in this subject in 1929. At this time he was already two years as clerk at the Geisenheim Research Center at the Institute of vines finishing as an assistant to Professor F. Muth. 1939 he became head of the Reichs-Rebenzuchtstation (Reichs-vine breeding station). He had to quit a year later because of his compulsory military service. 1945 Birk returned and devoted himself in postwar reconstruction.

Heinrich Birk gained reputation for the cultivation of some new grape varieties by cloning Riesling and crossing with other varieties. Birks idea was to create an early ripening wine compared to the traditional Riesling. So he directed experimental plots emerged with Arnsburger, Breidecker, Ehrenfelser, Hibernal, Osteiner, Reichensteiner, Rotberger, Schönburger and Witberger.

Some of the grape varieties bred by Heinrich Birk at the Research Institute Geisenheim : Arnsburger, Ehrenfelser, Gutenborner and Rotberger.
