= Orléans (grape) =

Variety of grape

- Grape (Vitis)
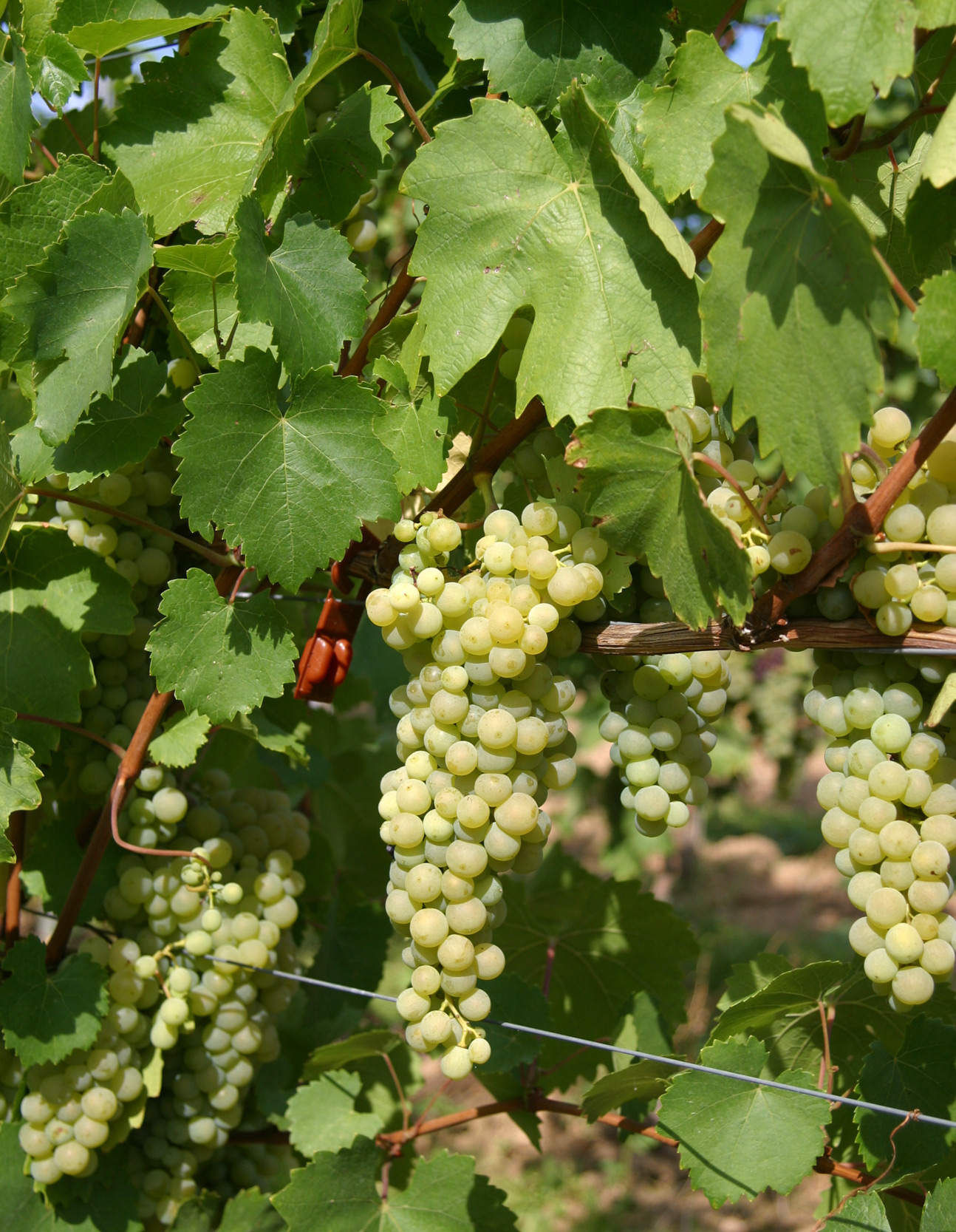
- Orléans growing in Geisenheim
- Color of berry skin: Blanc
- Species: Vitis vinifera
- Also called: Weisser Orléans, Gelber Orléans
- Origin: France?
- Notable regions: Germany
- Notable wines: German wine in the 19th century and earlier
- VIVC number: 8805

Orléans is a variety of white grape (sp. Vitis vinifera) which up until the 19th century was much grown in Germany, but in very little use since the early 20th century. It has large berries with thick skins and a high yield. Young Orléans wine has been described as somewhat reminiscent of wine made from white varieties of the pinot family, but with pineapple aromas.

== History ==
German legends claim that the variety is French in origin, actually from the city of Orléans, and that Charlemagne (742-814) was responsible for the first German plantings, which should have been in Rüdesheimer Berg in Rheingau, which were locally known as Berg Orléans. However, there seem to be no documentary evidence to support this, and other legends point to Charlemagne as an importer of red varieties. The origin of this grape variety is not known with precision; it could have been brought from France by the Cistercian monks who founded much of the German wine industry along Rhine. What is known is that has a long history in the wine-growing areas along the Rhine, where Orléans and Trollinger were common earlier than Riesling. In the 19th century, it was widely used in Gemischter Satz plantation together with varieties such as Elbling, Heunisch, Riesling, Pinot gris, Silvaner and Traminer. In the 19th century, It seems to have been particularly common in many of the best vineyard sites, such as Rüdesheimer Berg in Rheingau and the vineyards Jesuitengarten, Kirchenstück and Ungeheuer around Forst in the Palatinate, where it was mixed with Riesling and Traminer. The reason for this seems to be that, although high yielding, it is a late ripening variety that needed to be planted in these sites in order to ripen properly, and would not give a good quality in every year. Most likely this was the reason for its decline, since it had to compete for the best sites with Riesling. Varietally pure Orléans wines were considered to be heavy, spicy and long-lived.

In Rheingau, Orléans was down to 11.4 hectares (28 acres) in 1890, and the last Orléans wine in Rheingau was produced in 1921, after which the last vines were replaced with other varieties. For a long time, the variety was assumed to be extinct. In the 1980s, professor Helmut Becker of the Geisenheim Grape Breeding Institute found some Orléans vines that were growing untended in Rüdesheimer Berg, and managed to propagate them. In the early 1990s, Weingut Knipser in Laumersheim in the Palatinate became the custodians of the experimental planting of Orléans. They have since released several vintages to the market, including a highly regarded Auslese made in the hot year of 2003. In 1995-1996 Orléans returned to Rheingau when the historically interested Bernhard Breuer of Weingut Georg Breuer planted a small vineyard with 500 vines. From vintage 2000, Breuer have produced a few hundred bottles per year from these vines, and the wines have been considered quite good. The fact that it was once grown in excellent sites and was considered to give long-lived wines have most likely contributed to the ambition to save this variety for the future.

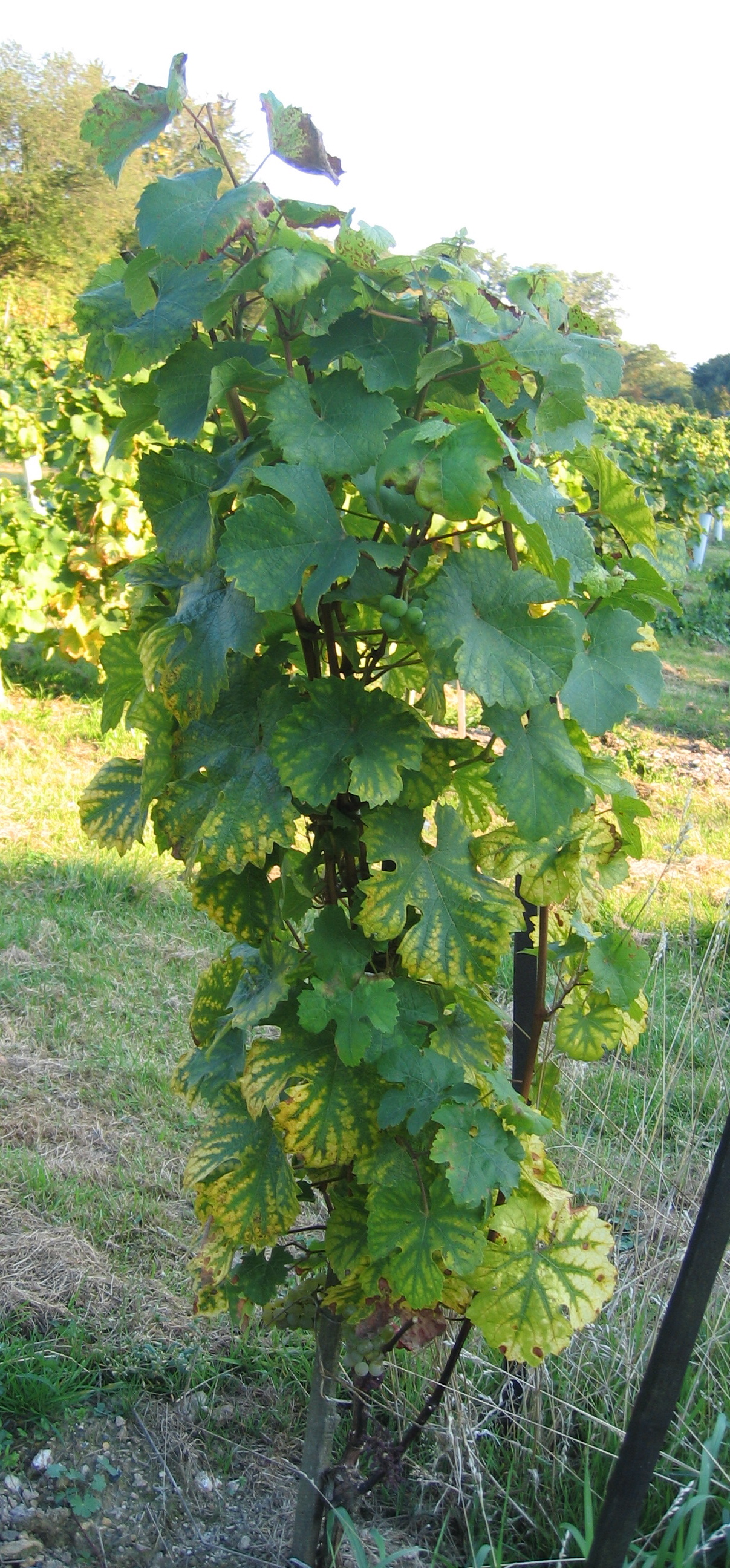
Orléans vine grown in an exhibition area next to Kloster Eberbach, trained in old Rheingau fashion

== Synonyms ==
Synonyms include Gartengst, Gelber Orléans, Gros Riesling, Hart Hengst, Hartheinisch, Hartheinsch, Harthengst, Orleansch, Orlaenzsch, Orleander, Orleaner, Weisser Orleaner, Orléans, Orléans Gelb, Orléans Jaune, Orléans Vert, Orléans Weiss, Orléanstraube, Orleanzer, Wälscher Weiss, and Weisser Orléans.
