= Wine tasting =

Method of judging wine

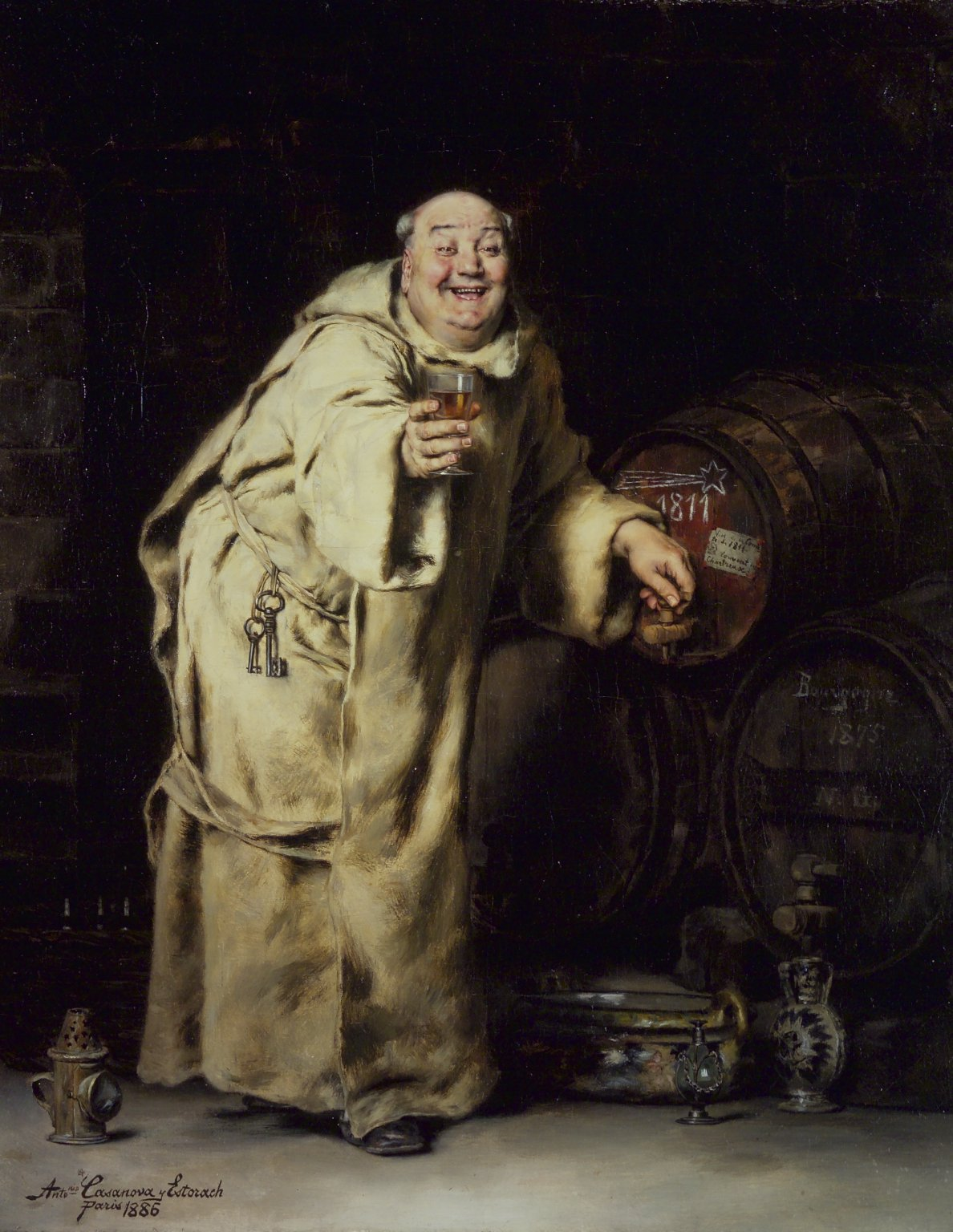
Monk Testing Wine by Antonio Casanova y Estorach (c. 1886)

Wine tasting is the sensory examination and evaluation of wine. While the practice of wine tasting is as ancient as its production, a more formalized methodology has slowly become established from the 14th century onward. Modern, professional wine tasters (such as sommeliers or buyers for retailers) use a constantly evolving specialized terminology which is used to describe the range of perceived flavors, aromas and general characteristics of a wine. More informal, recreational tasting may use similar terminology, usually involving a much less analytical process for a more general, personal appreciation.

Results that have surfaced through scientific blind wine tasting suggest the unreliability of wine tasting in both experts and consumers, such as inconsistency in identifying wines based on region and price.

== History ==
The Sumerian stories of Gilgamesh in the 3rd millennium BCE differentiate the popular beers of Mesopotamia, as well as wines from Zagros Mountains or Lebanon. In the fourth century BCE, Plato listed the main flavors of wine, and classified the aromas as "species", or families.

Aristotle proposed a sensory tasting defined by the four elements (air, water, fire, and earth) further deepened by the Roman philosopher Lucretius in the first century BCE.

Although the practice of tasting is as old as the history of wine, the term "tasting" first appeared in 1519. The methodology of wine tasting was formalized by the 18th century when Linnaeus, Poncelet, and others brought an understanding of tasting up to date.

In 2004, Richard Axel and Linda B. Buck, won the Nobel Prize in Medicine for their contribution to the knowledge of the senses of taste and smell.

== Tasting stages ==
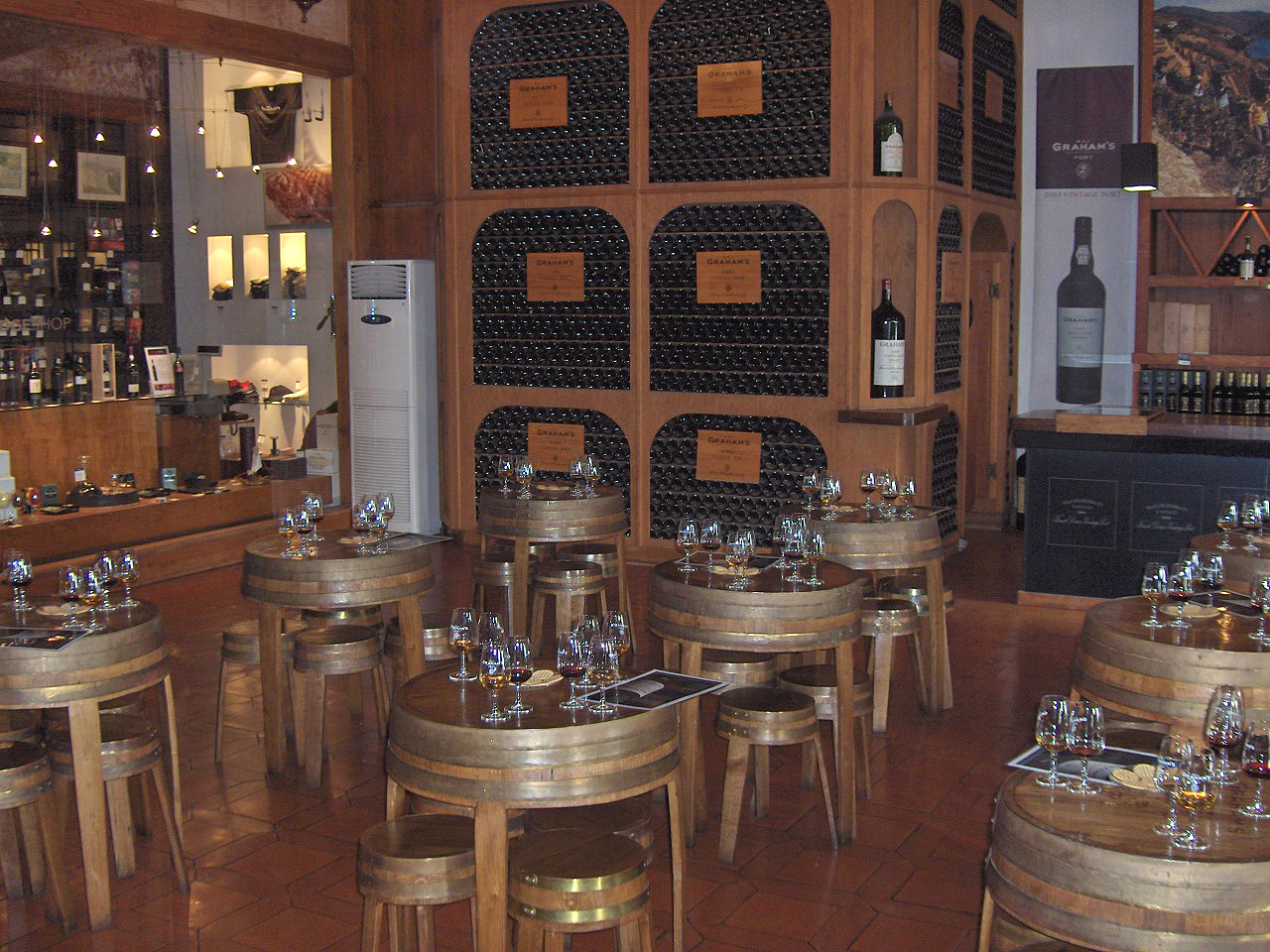
Ready tasting room of port wine in a wine cellar of a producer

The results of the four recognized stages to wine tasting:

- appearance
- "in glass" the aroma of the wine
- "in mouth" sensations
- "finish" (aftertaste)

– are combined in order to establish the following properties of a wine:

- complexity and character
- potential (suitability for aging or drinking)
- possible faults

A wine's overall quality assessment, based on this examination, follows further careful description and comparison with recognized standards, both with respect to other wines in its price range and according to known factors pertaining to the region or vintage; if it is typical of the region or diverges in style; if it uses certain wine-making techniques, such as barrel fermentation or malolactic fermentation, or any other remarkable or unusual characteristics.

Whereas wines are regularly tasted in isolation, a wine's quality assessment is more objective when performed alongside several other wines, in what are known as tasting "flights". Wines may be deliberately selected for their vintage ("horizontal" tasting) or proceed from a single winery ("vertical" tasting), to better compare vineyard and vintages, respectively. Alternatively, in order to promote an unbiased analysis, bottles and even glasses may be disguised in a "blind" tasting, to rule out any prejudicial awareness of either vintage or winery.

== Blind tasting ==
To ensure impartial judgment of a wine, it should be served blind – that is, without the taster(s) having seen the label or bottle shape. Blind tasting may also involve serving the wine from a black wine glass to mask the color of the wine. A taster's judgment can be prejudiced by knowing details of a wine, such as geographic origin, price, reputation, color, or other considerations.

Scientific research has long demonstrated the power of suggestion in perception as well as the strong effects of expectancies. For example, people expect more expensive wine to have more desirable characteristics than less expensive wine. When given wine that they are falsely told is expensive they virtually always report it as tasting better than the very same wine when they are told that it is inexpensive. French researcher Frédéric Brochet "submitted a mid-range Bordeaux in two different bottles, one labeled as a cheap table wine, the other bearing a grand cru etiquette." Tasters described the supposed grand cru as "woody, complex, and round" and the supposed cheap wine as "short, light, and faulty."

Similarly, people have expectations about wines because of their geographic origin, producer, vintage, color, and many other factors. For example, when Brochet served a white wine he received all the usual descriptions: "fresh, dry, honeyed, lively." Later he served the same wine dyed red and received the usual red terms: "intense, spicy, supple, deep."

One of the most famous instances of blind tasting is known as the Judgment of Paris, a wine competition held in 1976 where French judges blind-tasted wines from France and California. Against all expectations, California wines bested French wines according to the judges, a result which would have been unlikely in a non-blind contest. This event was depicted in the 2008 movie Bottle Shock.

=== Price bias ===
Another well-publicized double-blind taste test was conducted in 2011 by Richard Wiseman of the University of Hertfordshire. In a wine tasting experiment using 400 participants, Wiseman found that general members of the public were unable to distinguish expensive wines from inexpensive ones. "People just could not tell the difference between cheap and expensive wine".

=== Color bias ===
In 2001, the University of Bordeaux asked 54 undergraduate students to taste two glasses of wine: one red, one white. The participants described the red as "jammy" and commented on its crushed red fruit. The participants failed to recognize that both wines were from the same bottle. The only difference was that one had been colored red with a flavorless dye.

=== Geographic origin bias ===
For six years, Texas A&M University invited people to taste wines labeled "France", "California", "Texas", and while nearly all ranked the French as best, in fact, all three were the same Texan wine. The contest is built on the simple theory that if people do not know what they are drinking, they award points differently than if they do know what they are drinking.

== Vertical and horizontal tasting ==
Vertical and horizontal wine tastings are wine tasting events that are arranged to highlight differences between similar wines.

- In a vertical tasting, different vintages of the same wine type from the same winery are tasted. This emphasizes differences between various vintages.
- In a horizontal tasting, the wines are all from the same vintage but are from different wineries. Keeping wine variety or type and wine region the same helps emphasize differences in winery styles.

== Tasting flights ==
Tasting flight is a term used by wine tasters to describe a selection of wines, usually between three and eight glasses, but sometimes as many as fifty, presented for the purpose of sampling and comparison.

== Tasting notes ==
A tasting note is a taster's written testimony about the aroma, taste identification, acidity, structure, texture, and balance of a wine. Online wine communities like Bottlenotes allow members to maintain their tasting notes online and for the reference of others.

== Serving temperature ==
The temperature that a wine is served at can greatly affect the way it tastes and smells. Lower temperatures emphasize acidity and tannins while muting the aromatics. Higher temperatures minimize acidity and tannins while increasing the aromatics.

Wine type	Examples	Temperature (Celsius)	Temperature (Fahrenheit)
Light-bodied sweet dessert wines	Trockenbeerenauslese, Sauternes	6–10 °C	43–50 °F
White sparkling wines	Champagne, other sparkling wine	6–10 °C	43–50 °F
Aromatic, light-bodied white	Riesling, Sauvignon blanc	8–12 °C	46–54 °F
Red sparkling wines	Sparkling Shiraz, some frizzante Lambrusco	10–12 °C	50–54 °F
Medium-bodied whites	Chablis, Semillon	10–12 °C	50–54 °F
Full-bodied dessert wines	Oloroso Sherry, Madeira	8–12 °C	46–54 °F
Light-bodied red wines	Beaujolais, Provence rosé	10–12 °C	50–54 °F
Full-bodied white wines	Oaked Chardonnay, Rhone whites	12–16 °C	54–61 °F
Medium-bodied red wines	Grand Cru Burgundy, Sangiovese	14–17 °C	57–63 °F
Full-bodied red wines	Cabernet Sauvignon, Nebbiolo based wines	15–18 °C	59–64 °F

=== WSET recommendations ===
The Wine & Spirit Education Trust uses the following recommendations for serving temperatures:

- Sweet wines e.g. Sweet Muscats, Late-harvest wines (well chilled) 6 °C (43 °F) to 8 °C (46 °F)
- Sparkling wines e.g. Prosecco, Champagne (well chilled) 6 °C (43 °F) to 10 °C (50 °F)
- Light/medium-bodied whites e.g. Fino Sherry, Muscadet (chilled) 7 °C (45 °F) to 10 °C (50 °F)
- Medium/full-bodied oaked whites e.g. White Burgundy (lightly chilled) 10 °C (50 °F) to 13 °C (55 °F)
- Light-bodied reds e.g. Beaujolais, Valpolicella, Bardolino (lightly chilled) 13 °C (55 °F)
- Medium/full-bodied reds e.g. Vintage Port, Rioja, Bordeaux, Burgundy (room temperature) 15 °C (59 °F) to 18 °C (64 °F)

== Glassware ==
The shape of a wineglass can have a subtle impact on the perception of wine, especially its bouquet. Typically, the ideal shape is considered to be wider toward the bottom, with a narrower aperture at the top (tulip or egg-shaped). Glasses which are widest at the top are considered the least ideal. Many wine tastings use ISO XL5 glasses, which are "egg"-shaped. The effect of glass shape does not appear to be related to whether the glass is pleasing to look at.

INAO official wine tasting glass

The glass of reference is the INAO wine glass, a tool defined by specifications of the French Association for Standardization (AFNOR), which was adopted by INAO as the official glass in 1970, received its standard AFNOR in June 1971 and its ISO 3591 standard in 1972. The INAO has not submitted a file at the National Institute of Industrial Property, it is therefore copied en masse and has gradually replaced other tasting glasses in the world.

The glass must be lead crystal (9% lead). Its dimensions give it a total volume between 210 ml and 225 ml, they are defined as follows:

- Diameter of the rim: 46 mm
- Calyx height: 100 mm
- Height of the foot: 55 mm
- Shoulder diameter: 65 mm
- Foot diameter: 9 mm
- Diameter of the base: 65 mm

The opening is narrower than the convex part so as to concentrate the bouquet. The capacity is approximately 215 ml, but it is intended to take a 50 ml pour. Some glasses of a similar shape, but with different capacities, may be loosely referred to as ISO glasses, but they form no part of the ISO specification.

== Wine color ==
Without having tasted the wines, one does not know if, for example, a white is heavy or light. Before taking a sip, the taster tries to determine the order in which the wines should be assessed by appearance and aroma alone. Heavy wines are deeper in color and generally more intense on the nose. Sweeter wines, being denser, leave thick, viscous streaks (called legs or tears) down the inside of the glass when swirled.

== Process ==
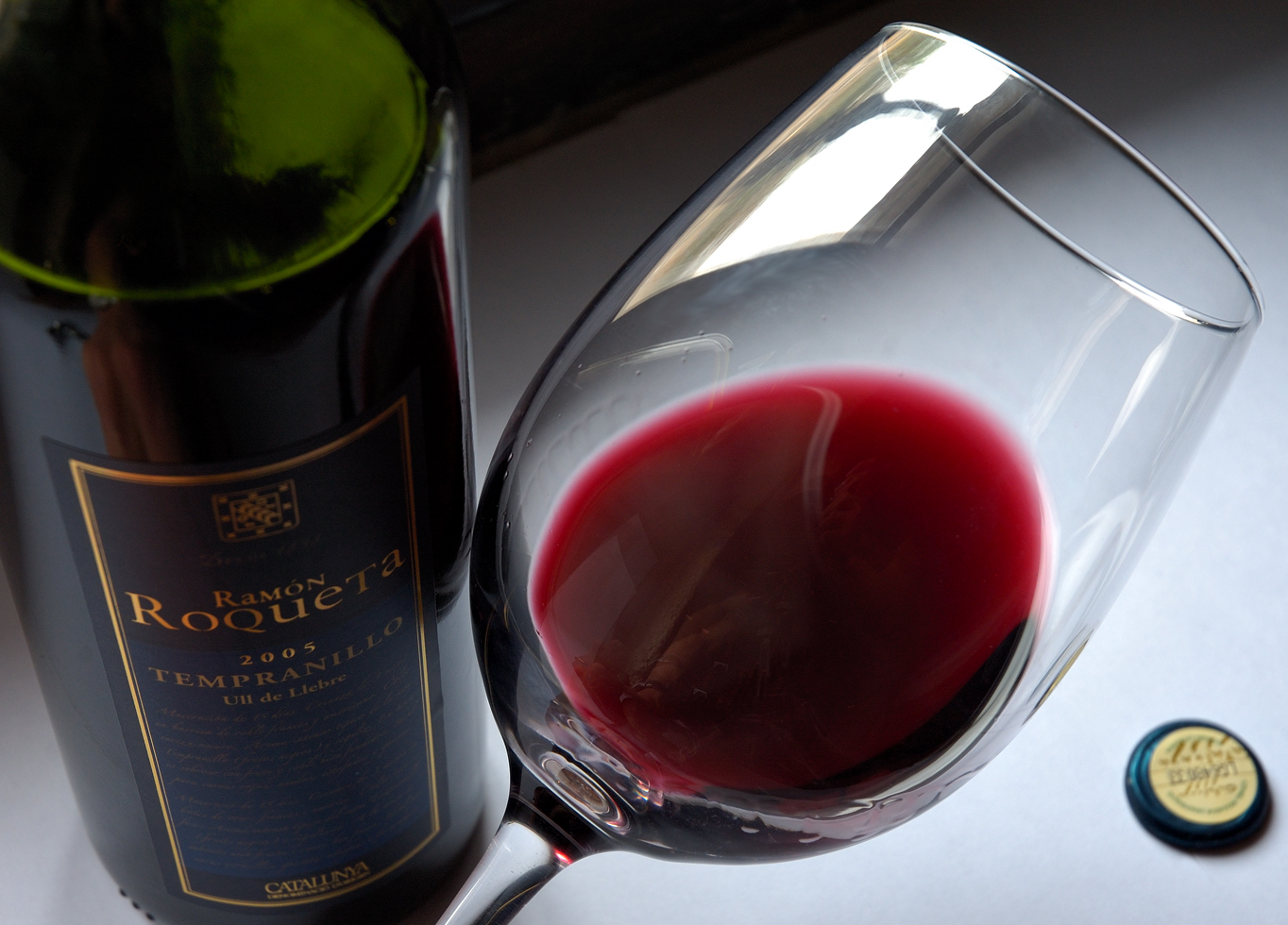
Judging color is the first step in tasting wine.

There are five basic steps in tasting wine: color, swirl, smell, taste, and savor. These are also known as the "five S" steps: see, swirl, sniff, sip, savor. During this process, a taster must look for clarity, varietal character, integration, expressiveness, complexity, and connectedness.

A wine's color is better judged by putting it against a white background. The wine glass is put at an angle in order to see the colors. Colors can give the taster clues to the grape variety, and whether the wine was aged in wood.

=== Characteristics assessed during tasting ===
Varietal character describes how much a wine presents its inherent grape aromas. A wine taster also looks for integration, which is a state in which none of the components of the wine (acid, tannin, alcohol, etc.) is out of balance with the other components. When a wine is well balanced, the wine is said to have achieved a harmonious fusion.

Another important quality of the wine to look for is its expressiveness. Expressiveness is the quality the "wine possesses when its aromas and flavors are well-defined and clearly projected." The complexity of the wine is affected by many factors, one of which may be the multiplicity of its flavors. The connectedness of the wine, a rather abstract and difficult to ascertain quality, describes the bond between the wine and its land of origin (terroir).

=== Connoisseur wine tasting ===
A wine's quality can be judged by its bouquet and taste. The bouquet is the total aromatic experience of the wine. Assessing a wine's bouquet can also reveal faults such as cork taint; oxidation due to age, overexposure to oxygen, or lack of preservatives; and wild yeast or bacterial contamination, such as those due to Acetobacter or Brettanomyces yeasts. Although low levels of Brettanomyces aromatic characteristics can be a positive attribute, giving the wine a distinctive character, generally it is considered a wine spoilage yeast.

The bouquet of wine is best revealed by gently swirling the wine in a wine glass to expose it to more oxygen and release more aromatic etheric, ester, and aldehyde molecules that comprise the essential components of a wine's bouquet. Sparkling wine should not be swirled to the point of releasing bubbles.

Pausing to experience a wine's bouquet aids the wine taster in anticipating the wine's flavors. The "nose" of a wine – its bouquet or aroma – is the major determinate of perceived flavor in the mouth. Once inside the mouth, the aromatics are further liberated by exposure to body heat, and transferred retronasally to the olfactory receptor site. It is here that the complex taste experience characteristic of a wine actually commences.

Thoroughly tasting a wine involves perception of its array of taste and mouthfeel attributes, which involve the combination of textures, flavors, weight, and overall "structure". Following appreciation of its olfactory characteristics, the wine taster savors a wine by holding it in the mouth for a few seconds to saturate the taste buds. By pursing one's lips and breathing through that small opening, oxygen passes over the wine and releases even more esters. When the wine is allowed to pass slowly through the mouth it presents the connoisseur with the fullest gustatory profile available to the human palate.

The acts of pausing and focusing through each step distinguishes wine tasting from simple quaffing. Through this process, the full array of aromatic molecules is captured and interpreted by approximately 15 million olfactory receptors, comprising a few hundred olfactory receptor classes. When tasting several wines in succession, however, key aspects of this fuller experience (length and finish, or aftertaste) must necessarily be sacrificed through expectoration.

Although taste qualities are known to be widely distributed throughout the oral cavity, the concept of an anatomical "tongue map" yet persists in the wine tasting arena, in which different tastes are believed to map to different areas of the tongue. A widely accepted example is the misperception that the tip of the tongue uniquely tells how sweet a wine is and the upper edges tell its acidity.

== Scoring wine ==
As part of the tasting process, and as a way of comparing the merits of the various wines, wines are given scores according to a relatively set system. This may be either by explicitly weighting different aspects, or by global judgment (although the same aspects would be considered). These aspects are 1) the appearance of the wine, 2) the nose or smell, 3) the palate or taste, and 4) overall. Different systems weight these differently (e.g., appearance 15%, nose 35%, palate 50%). Typically, no modern wine would score less than half on any scale (which would effectively indicate an obvious fault). It is more common for wines to be scored out of 20 (including half marks) in Europe and parts of Australasia, and out of 100 in the US. However, different critics tend to have their own preferred system, and some gradings are also given out of 5 (again with half marks).

== Visiting wineries ==
Traveling to wine regions is one way of increasing skill in tasting. Many wine producers in wine regions all over the world offer tastings of their wine. Depending on the country or region, tasting at the winery may incur a small charge to allow the producer to cover costs.

It is not considered rude to spit out wine at a winery, even in the presence of the wine maker or owner. Generally, a spittoon is provided. In some regions of the world, tasters simply spit on the floor or onto gravel surrounding barrels. It is polite to inquire about where to spit before beginning tasting.

== Attending wine schools ==
A growing number of wine schools can be found, offering wine tasting classes to the public. These programs often help a wine taster hone and develop their abilities in a controlled setting. Some also offer professional training for sommeliers and winemakers. It is even possible to learn how to assess wine methodically via e-learning.

== Expectoration ==
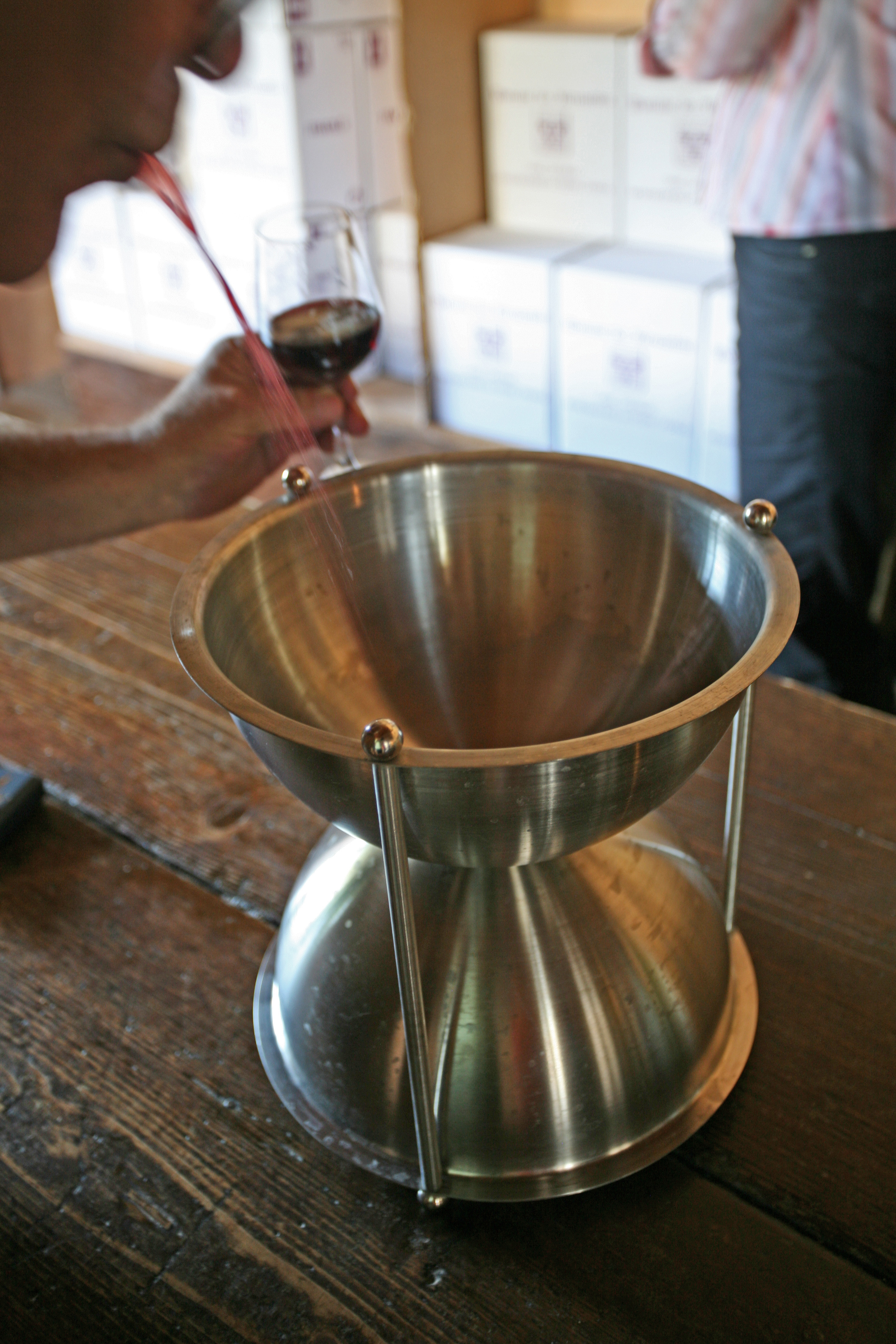
Spitting into a spittoon at a wine tasting

Because intoxication can affect the consumer's judgment, wine tasters generally spit the wine out after they have assessed its quality at formal tastings, where dozens of wines may be assessed. However, since wine is absorbed through the skin inside the mouth, tasting from twenty to twenty-five samplings can still produce an intoxicating effect, depending on the alcoholic content of the wine.

== Sensory analysis ==
Tasting plays an important role in the sensory analysis (also referred to as organoleptic analysis) of wine. Employing a trained or consumer panel, oenologists may perform a variety of tests on the taste, aroma, mouthfeel and appeal of wines. Difference tests are important in determining whether different fermentation conditions or new vineyard treatments alter the character of a wine, something particularly important to producers who aim for consistency. Preference testing establishes consumer preference, while descriptive analysis determines the most prominent traits of the wine, some of which grace back labels. Blind tasting and other laboratory controls help mitigate bias and assure statistically significant results. Many large wine companies now boast their own sensory team, optimally consisting of a Ph.D. sensory scientist, a flavor chemist and a trained panel.

== Grape varieties ==
Wine grape varieties are variously evaluated according to a wide range of descriptors which draw comparisons with other, non-grape flavors and aromas. The following table provides a brief and by no means exhaustive summary of typical descriptors for the better-known varietals.

Red grape variety	Common sensory descriptors
Cabernet Franc	tobacco, green bell pepper, raspberry, freshly mown grass
Cabernet Sauvignon	blackcurrants, eucalyptus, chocolate, tobacco
Gamay	pomegranate, strawberry
Grenache	smoky, pepper, raspberry
Malbec	violet, plums, tart red fruit, earthy minerality
Merlot	black cherry, plums, tomato
Mourvèdre	thyme, clove, cinnamon, black pepper, violet, blackberry
Nebbiolo	leather, tar, stewed prunes, chocolate, liquorice, roses, prunes
Norton	red fruit, elderberries
Petite Sirah (Durif)	earthy, black pepper, dark fruits
Petit Verdot	violets (later), pencil shavings
Pinot noir	raspberry, cherry, violets, "farmyard" (with age), truffles
Pinotage	bramble fruits, earthy, smoky
Sangiovese	herbs, black cherry, leathery, earthy
Syrah (Shiraz)	tobacco, black/white pepper, blackberry, smoke
Tempranillo	vanilla, strawberry, tobacco
Teroldego	spices, chocolate, red fruits
Zinfandel	black cherry, pepper, mixed spices, mint, anise

White grape variety	Common sensory descriptors
Albariño	lemon, minerals, apricot, peach
Breidecker	apple, pear
Chardonnay	butter, melon, apple, pineapple, vanilla (if oaked, e.g. vinified or aged in new oak aging barrels)
Chenin blanc	wet wool, beeswax, honey, apple, almond
Gewürztraminer	rose petals, lychee, spice
Grüner Veltliner	green apple, citrus
Marsanne	almond, honeysuckle, marzipan
Melon de Bourgogne	lime, salt, green apple
Muscato	honey, grapes, lime
Palomino	honeydew, citrus, raw nuts
Pinot gris (Pinot grigio)	white peach, pear, apricot
Prosecco	apple, honey, musk, citrus
Riesling	citrus fruits, peach, honey, petrol
Sauvignon blanc	gooseberry, lime, asparagus, cut grass, bell pepper (capsicum), grapefruit, passionfruit, cat pee (tasters' term for guava)
Sémillon	honey, orange, lime
Trebbiano (Ugni blanc)	lime, herbs
Verdicchio	apple, minerals, citrus, lemon, almond
Vermentino	pear, cream, green fruits
Viognier	peach, pear, nutmeg, apricot

== See also ==
- Aroma wheel
- Coffee cupping
- Degustation
- Tea tasting
- Typicity
- Wine accessory
- Wine and food matching
