= Souvignier gris =

Variety of grape

- Grape (Vitis)
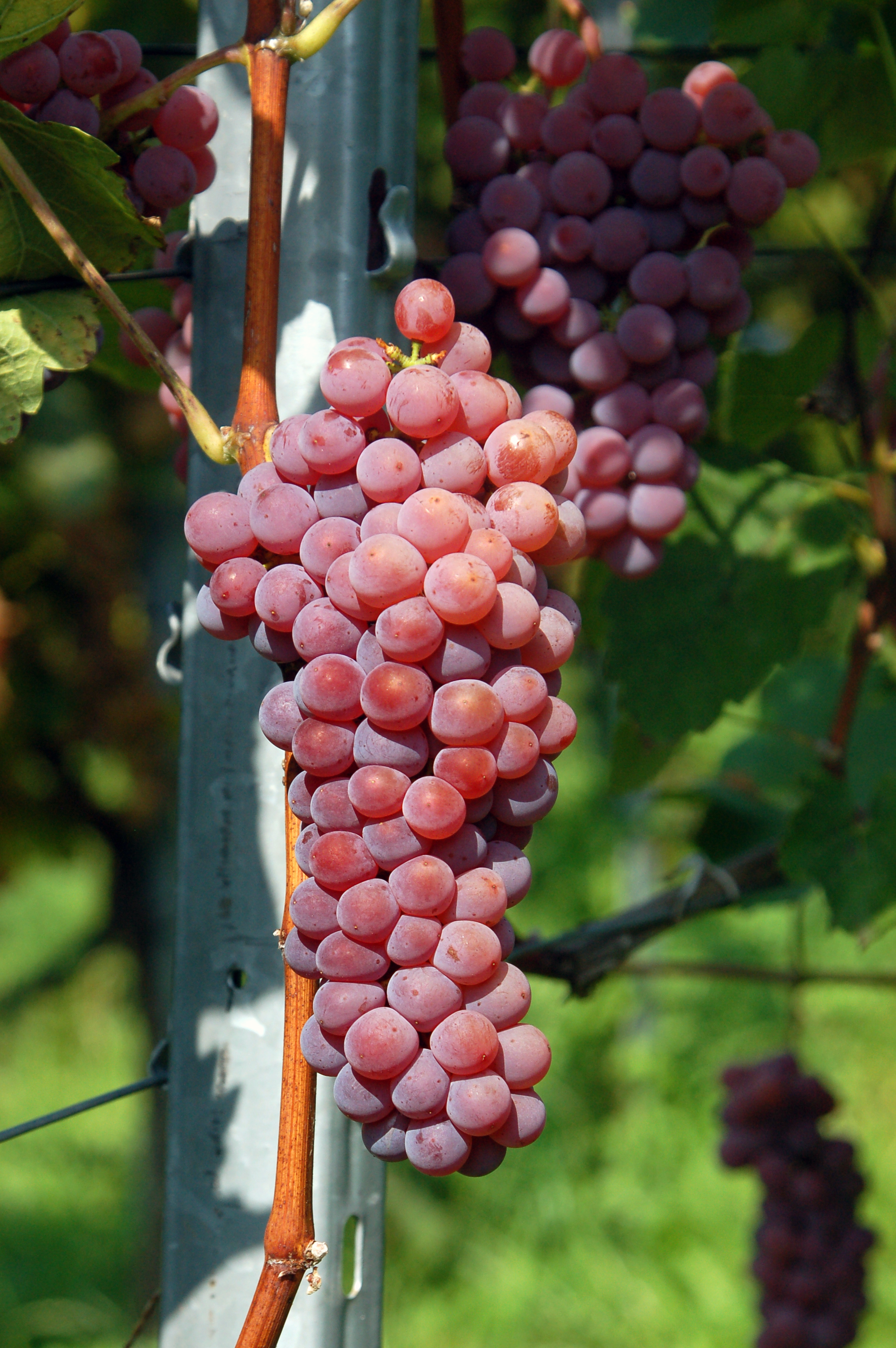
- VIVC number: 22629

Souvignier gris is a white German wine grape variety that was created in 1983 by Dr. Norbert Becker. It is a cross between Seyval blanc and Zähringer, but was originally thought to be a cross between Cabernet Sauvignon and Bronner.

== History and lineage ==
Souvignier gris was developed in 1983 at the viticultural research institute of Freiburg, Germany, and DNA analysis has shown it to be a cross between Seyval Blanc and Zähringer. Souvignier Gris tops the list of the most widely planted varieties in Germany in 2025, for the second year in a row. With an increase of 170 hectares, it is the fastest-growing grape variety in Germany by far, well ahead of Chardonnay (+102 ha). Currently, 766 hectares are planted with this variety. This makes Souvignier Gris by far the most important white PIWI variety in Germany.

=== Originally reported lineage ===
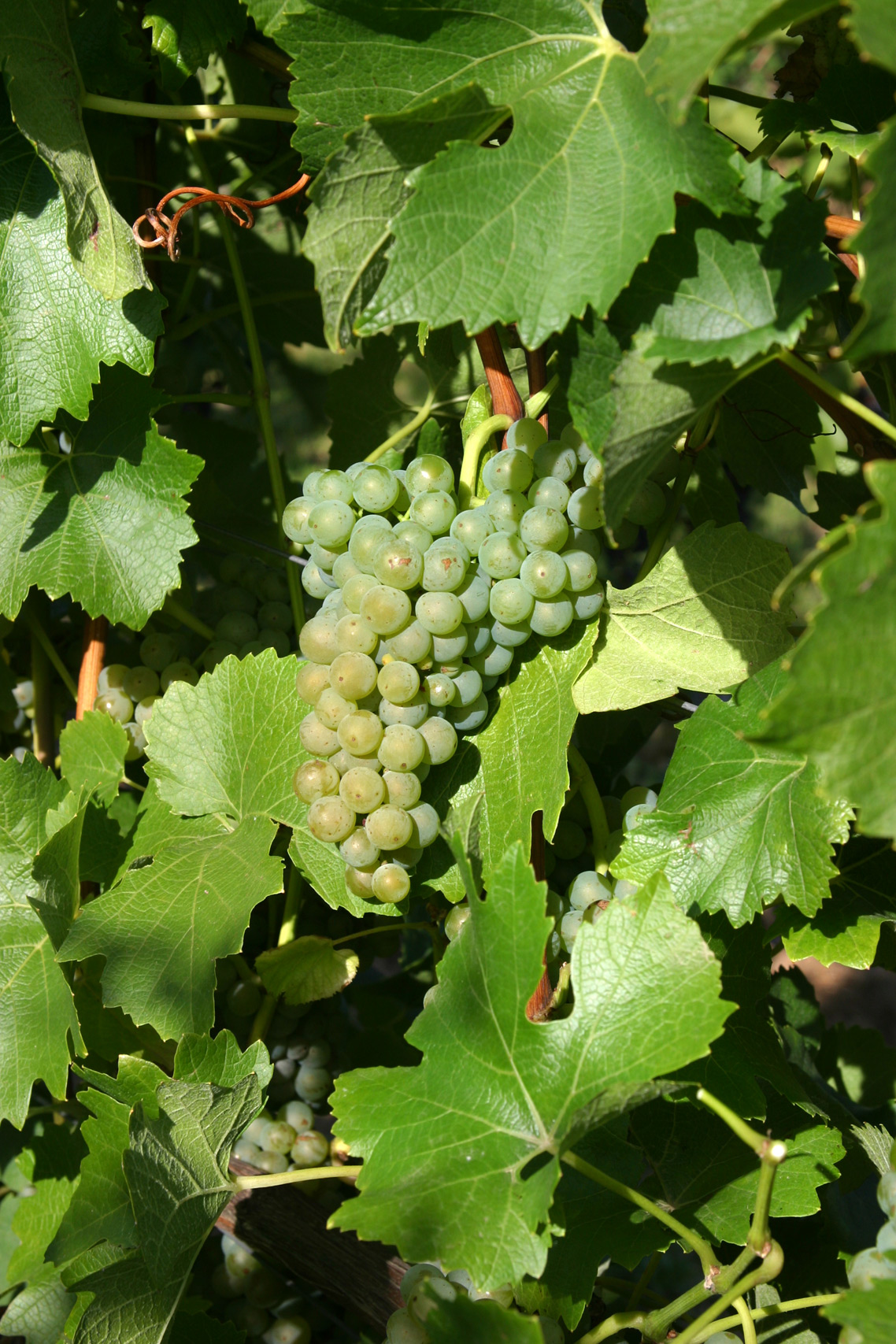
Bronner, one of the supposed parent varieties of Souvignier gris.

Souvignier gris was originally incorrectly registered as a cross between the red French wine grape variety Cabernet Sauvignon and the white German grape crossing previously created by Becker known as Bronner.

Bronner was also developed by Becker in 1975 at the viticultural research institute of Freiburg, and is a crossing of the hybrid varieties Merzling (mother vine) and Geisenheim 6494 (father vine). Geisenheim 6494 is a crossing of Zarya Severa with St. Laurent while Zähringer is a crossing between Gewürztraminer and Riesling.

The other supposed parent, Cabernet Sauvignon, would have made Souvignier gris a grandchild variety of the white variety Sauvignon blanc and the red variety Cabernet Franc.

== Synonyms ==
As a relatively recently created grape crossing, Souvignier gris is not known under many other names with only the breeding codes FR 392-83 and Freiburg 392-83, or even Morelle Rose (in Jura wine), being listed as officially recognized synonyms by the Vitis International Variety Catalogue (VIVC).
