= Hibernal =

Hibernal may refer to:

- Winter-related
- Chlorpromazine, by trade name
- Hibernal (grape), a variety of wine grape
