= Ehrenfelser =

Variety of grape

- Grape (Vitis)
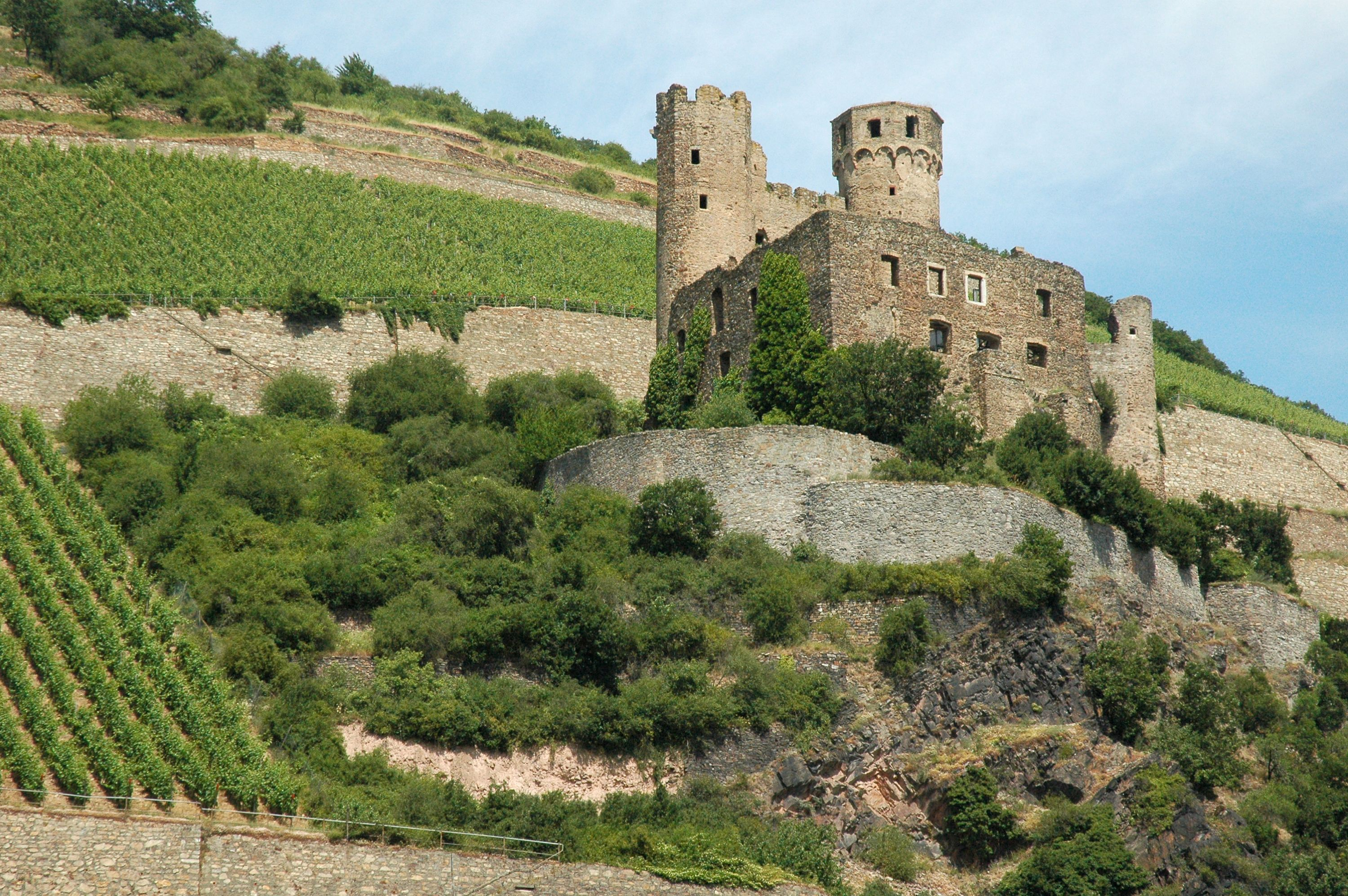
- The ruins of Burg Ehrenfels, from which the Ehrenfelser grape takes its name, amidst vineyards in Rüdesheim
- Color of berry skin: Blanc
- Species: Vitis vinifera
- Also called: Geisenheim 9-93
- Origin: Geisenheim, Rheingau, Germany
- Pedigree parent 1: Riesling
- Pedigree parent 2: Knipperlé
- VIVC number: 3847

Ehrenfelser is a white wine grape variety of German origin. It was created by Dr. Heinrich Birk (1898-1973) at the Geisenheim Grape Breeding Institute in 1929, by crossing Riesling with what was thought at the time to be Silvaner, but DNA markers have since indicated it was the Alsace variety Knipperlé.

Ehrenfelser was first grown primarily in the Palatinate and Rheinhessen regions in Germany, however as is the case with most white German "new crosses", plantings within Germany have decreased considerably in recent years. In 2006, only 112 hectares (280 acres) of plantings remained, down from 255 hectares (630 acres) in 1999.

Ehrenfelser has found some success outside Germany, mainly in Canada, in the Okanagan Valley of British Columbia. Wineries including Cedar Creek, Lake Breeze, Gray Monk, Gehringer Brothers, Mount Boucherie, Quails' Gate and Summerhill make both still and ice wine styles. There have also been smaller plantings in Washington state, Canterbury (New Zealand) and Australia The grape tends to ripen earlier and produce higher yields than Riesling.

The variety normally consistently produces grapes of at least Kabinett level ripeness and tends to produce well in vineyards where Riesling has difficulties.

Ehrenfelser derives its name from the Burg Ehrenfels ruins located on the Rhine near Rüdesheim. It is also known under the synonym Geisenheim 9-93.

Ehrenfelser was crossed with Reichensteiner to create Ehrenbreitsteiner.
