= Dunkelfelder =

Variety of grape

- Grape (Vitis)
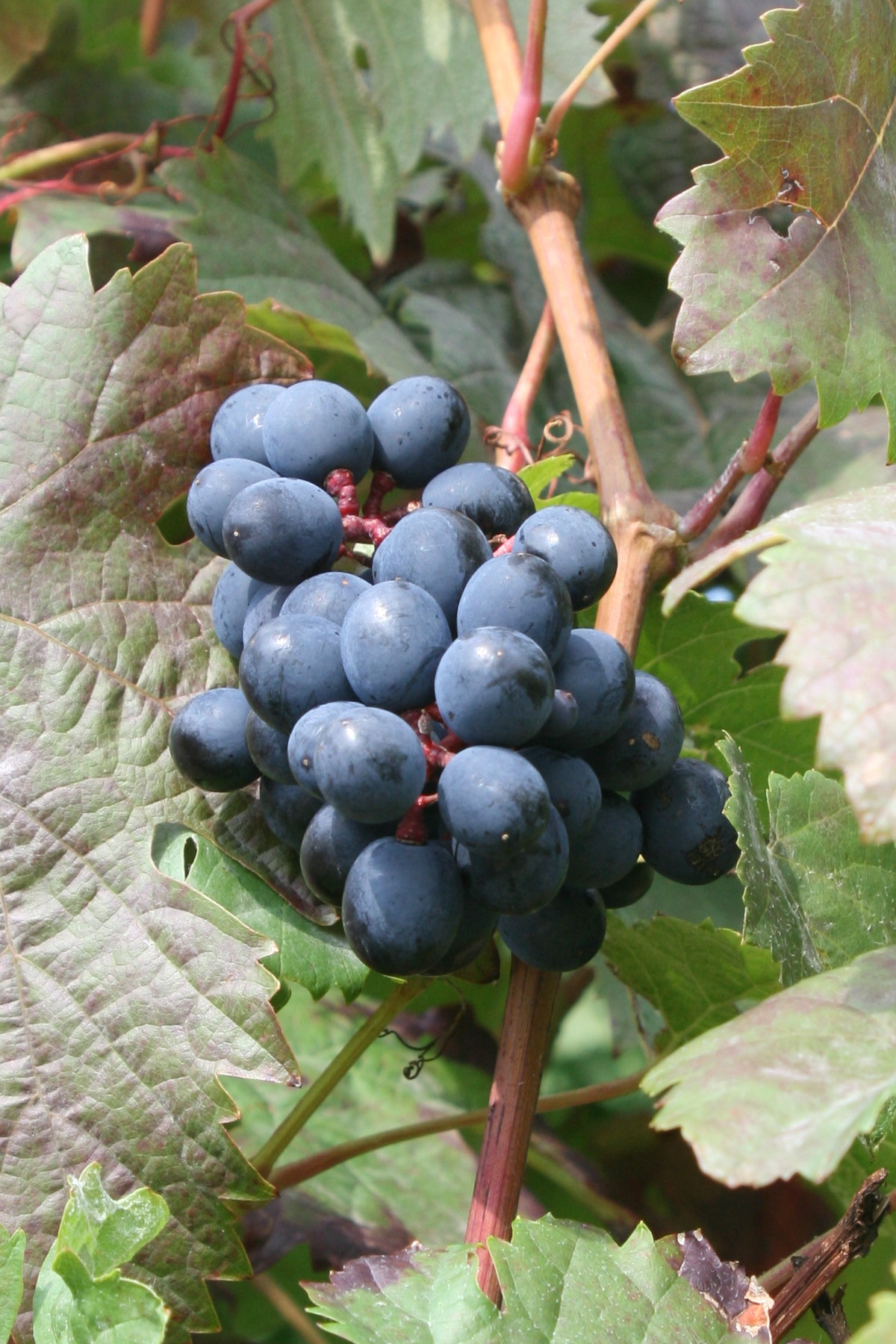
- Dunkelfelder in Weinsberg, Germany
- Species: Vitis vinifera
- Also called: Froelich V 4-4
- Origin: Siebeldingen, Palatinate, Germany
- VIVC number: 3724

Dunkelfelder is a dark-skinned variety of grape used for red wine. It was created by German viticulturalist Gustav Adolf Froelich (1847–1912). He probably crossed Färbertraube (a teinturier) with Blauer Portugieser. The variety, initially called Froelich V 4-4, did not receive any attention for several decades until work was continued on it at Geisenheim grape breeding institute in the 1930s. It was named Dunkelfelder (dunkel = dark) by ampelographer Helmut Becker, due to its unclear parentage and its dark colour. Dunkelfelder received varietal protection and was released for general cultivation in 1980.

In 2006, there were 372 hectares (920 acres) of Dunkelfelder in Germany, with an approximately constant trend. Plantings of Dunkelfelder are primarily found in Ahr, Baden, Nahe, Palatinate and Rheinhessen.

Dunkelfelder wines are deep and dark red in colour, which used to be difficult to achieve with German red wines, and it has therefore often been used for blends, although varietal Dunkelfelder wines are also produced.

It is known under the synonyms Farbtraube Froelich, Froelich V 4-4 and Purpur.
