= B28 =

B28, B 28 or B-28 may refer to:

- B28 expressway (Croatia), a road in central Croatia
- North American B-28 Dragon, a proposed World War II medium bomber
- B28 (trainset), an under development Indian high-speed electric multiple unit.
- B-28 (grape), another name for the Swiss wine grape Garanoir
- B28 nuclear bomb
- Bundesstraße 28, a German road
- Band 28 (700 MHz), a band used by public mobile phone operators
