= Gutenborner =

Variety of grape

- Grape (Vitis)
- Color of berry skin: Blanc
- Species: Vitis vinifera
- Also called: Geisenheim 17-52
- Origin: Geisenheim, Germany
- VIVC number: 5145

Gutenborner is a white German wine grape that is also used in English wine production. The grape was created in 1928 by Heinrich Birk at Forschungsanstalt Geisenheim by crossing of Müller-Thurgau and Bicane (also known as Chasselas Napoleon).

The only synonym of Gutenborner is its breeding code, Geisenheim 17–52.
