= Arnsburger =

Variety of grape

- Grape (Vitis)
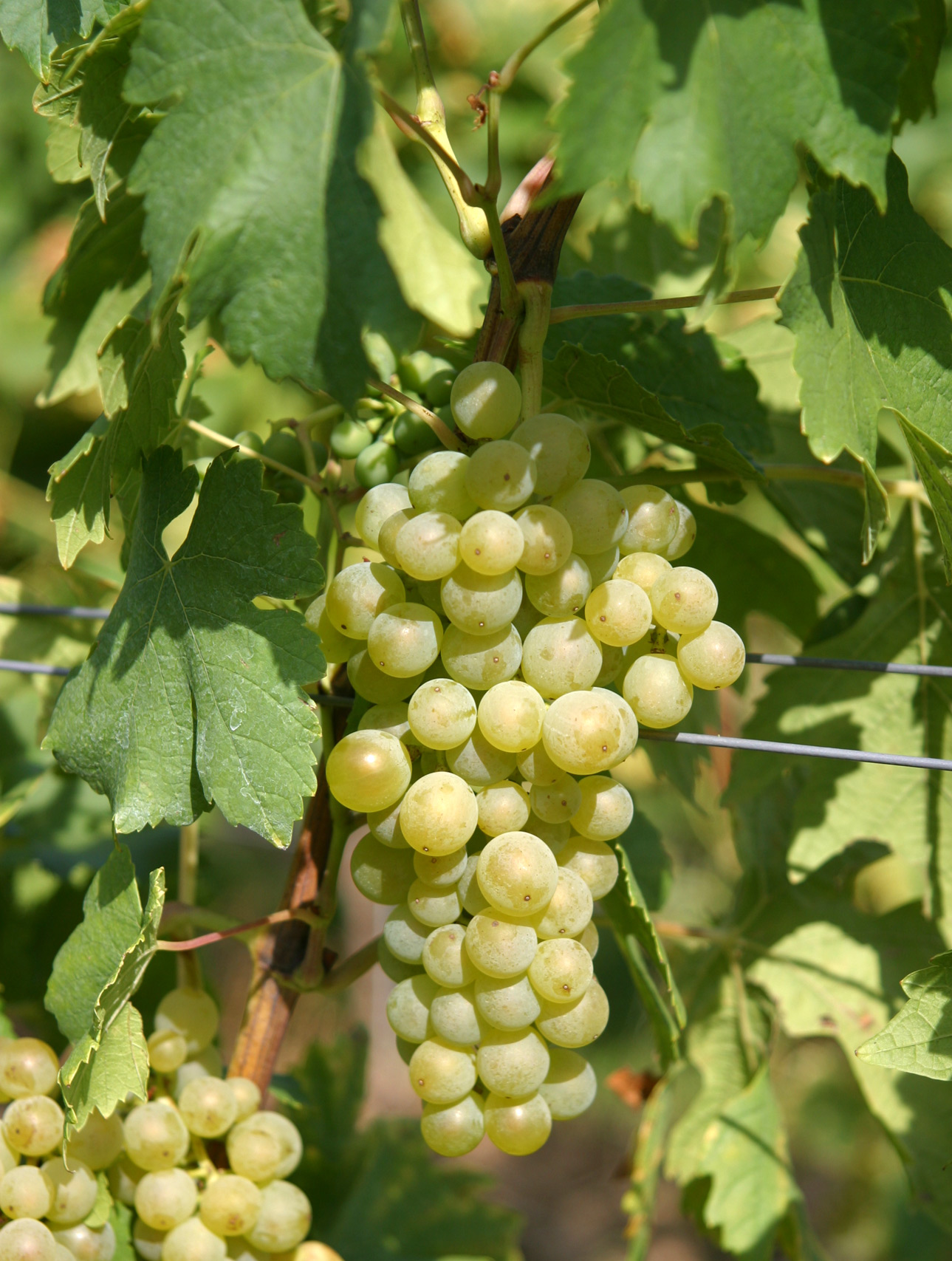
- Arnsburger grapes
- Color of berry skin: Blanc
- Species: Vitis vinifera
- Also called: Geisenheim 22-74
- Origin: Geisenheim, Germany
- Notable regions: Germany, Madeira, Italy, New Zealand
- VIVC number: 630

Arnsburger is a white variety of grape used for wine. It was created 1939 by Heinrich Birk (1898–1973) at the Geisenheim Grape Breeding Institute by crossing two clones of Riesling, clone 88 and clone 64. Arnsburger did not receive varietal protection until 1984. It was named after Arnsburg Abbey, a ruin of a Cistercian abbey in Wetterau, as a homage of the importance of Cistercians in the history of German wine.

Plantations of Arnsburger is very small. Other than in Germany, small plantation on Madeira, in Italy and on New Zealand are known.

Arnsburger has low susceptibility to gray rot, a fruitiness similar to Riesling. It gives higher yields than Müller-Thurgau but lower must weights.

The only synonym of Arnsburger is its breeding code Geisenheim 22- 74.

Arnsburg was used as a crossing partner for Saphira.
