= Rotberger =

Variety of grape

- Grape (Vitis)
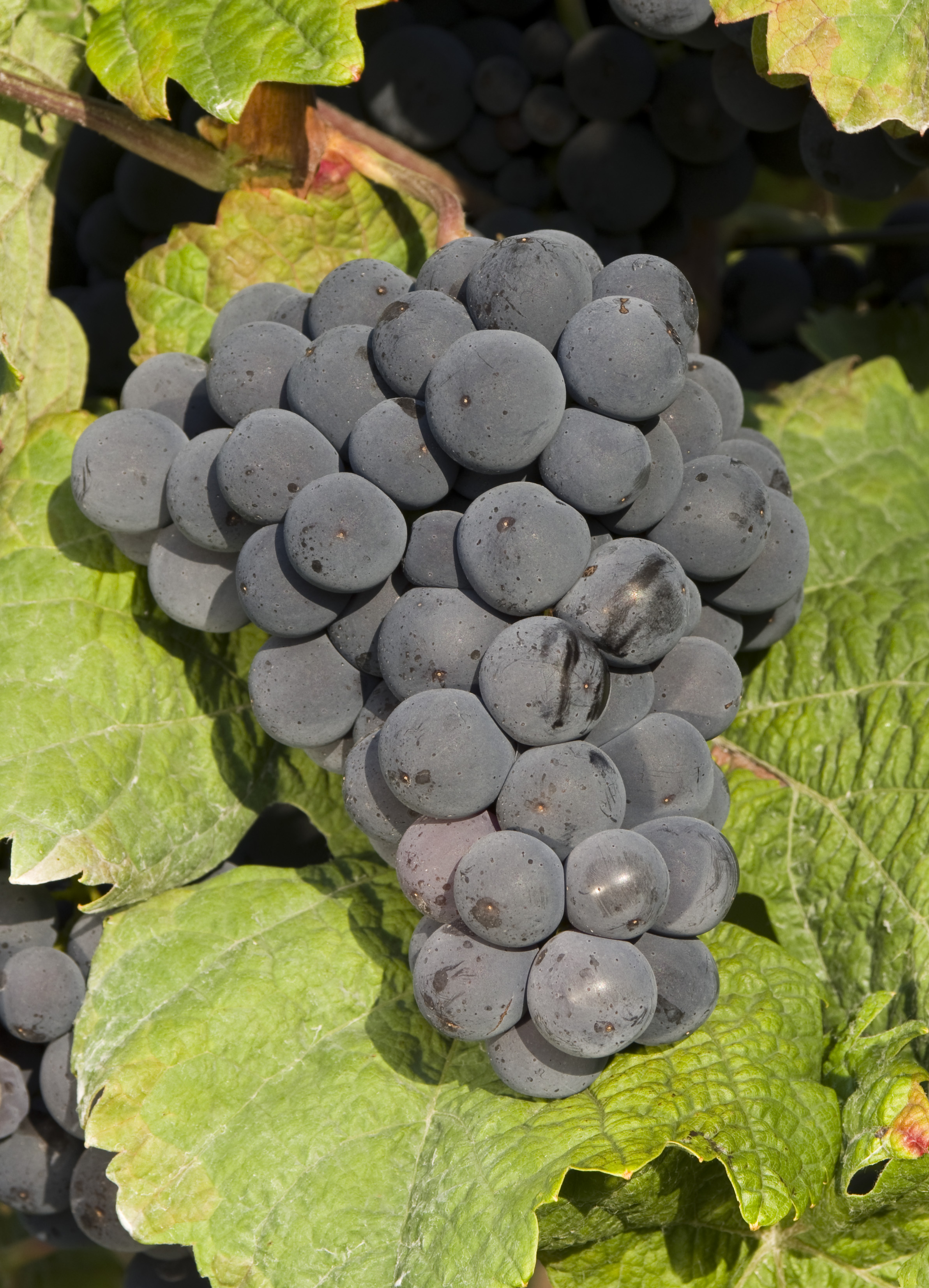
- Rotberger cluster in the field
- Species: Vitis vinifera
- Also called: Geisenheim 3-37, Redberger
- Origin: Germany
- Original pedigree: Schiava Grossa × Riesling
- Notable regions: Baden, Württemberg, Ahr
- Breeder: Heinrich Birk
- Breeding institute: Forschungsanstalt Geisenheim, Fachgebiet Rebenzüchtung und Rebenveredlung
- Year of crossing: 1928
- VIVC number: 10230

Rotberger is a wine grape variety. Its parentage is not known with certainty but it is thought to be from a cross of Trollinger and Riesling grapes. Dr. Heinrich Birk (1898-1973) produced the cross at the Geisenheim Grape Breeding Institute in 1928. It is used to produce fruity, early maturing light red wines in cool-climate areas. It is often best drunk when young and can be used to produce a rosé or sparkling wine. It has no relationship with the Rotburger variety bearing a nearly similar name which is also known as Zweigelt.

Production of rotberger is quite small and primarily limited to Austria, Canada, Germany, and Liechtenstein.
