= Gamaret =

Variety of grape

- Grape (Vitis)
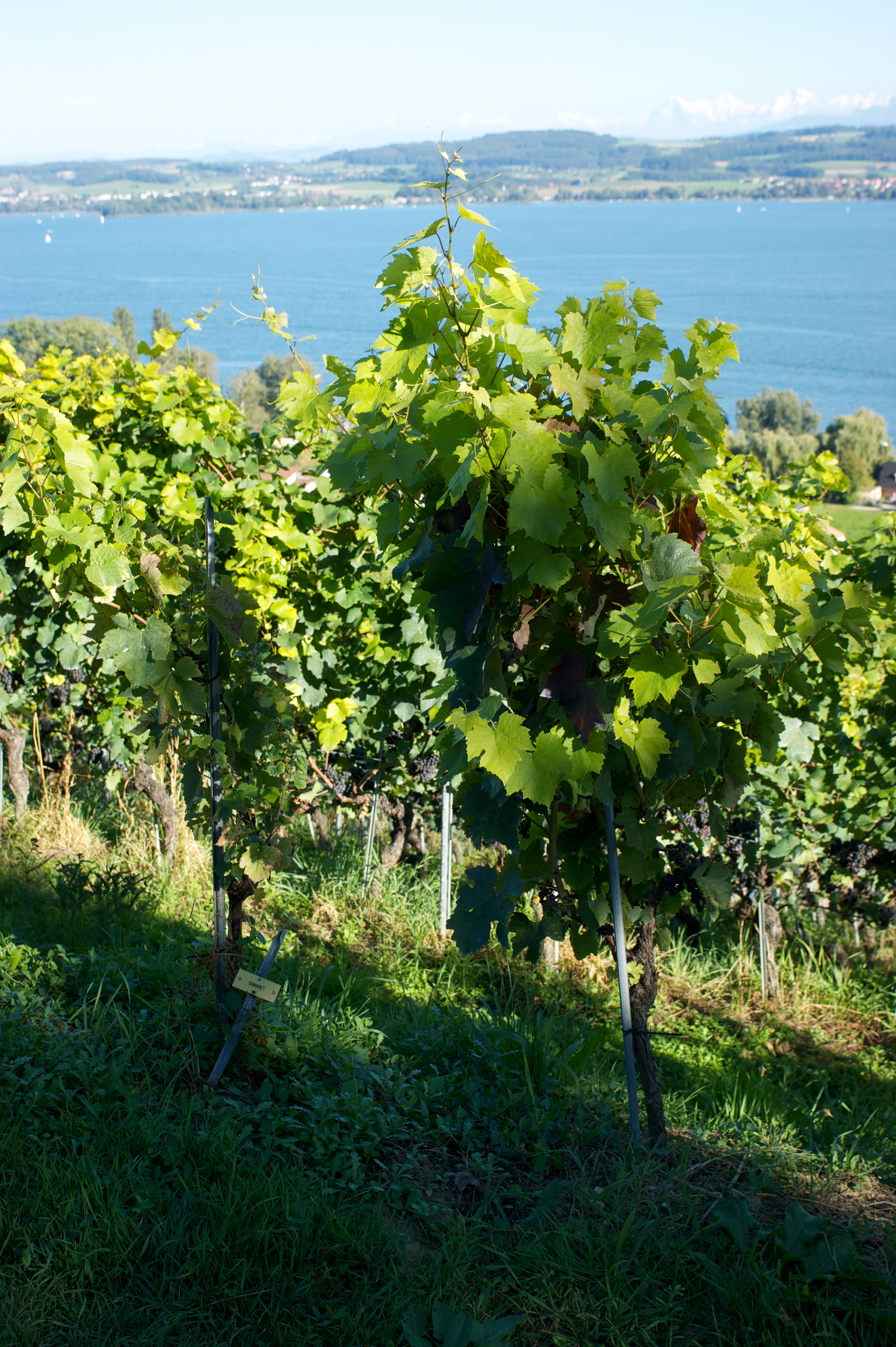
- Gamaret grape vines in Switzerland
- Color of berry skin: Noir
- Species: Vitis vinifera
- Also called: Pully B-13
- Origin: Switzerland
- Notable regions: Geneva
- VIVC number: 16022

Gamaret is a variety of red wine grape. It was created by André Jaquinet at Station Fédérale de Recherches en Production Végétale de Changins in 1970 by crossing Gamay and Reichensteiner. Gamaret was developed for cultivation in French Switzerland, and is a full sibling of Garanoir, which was intended for the German part of the country.

Total Swiss plantations of the variety in 2009 stood at 380 hectares (940 acres).

Gamaret has good resistance to rot and ripens early. It gives dark purple wine with aromas of blackberries and spices and subtle tannin.

== Synonyms ==
The only synonym of Gamaret is Pully B-13.
