= Merzling =

Variety of grape

- Grape (Vitis)
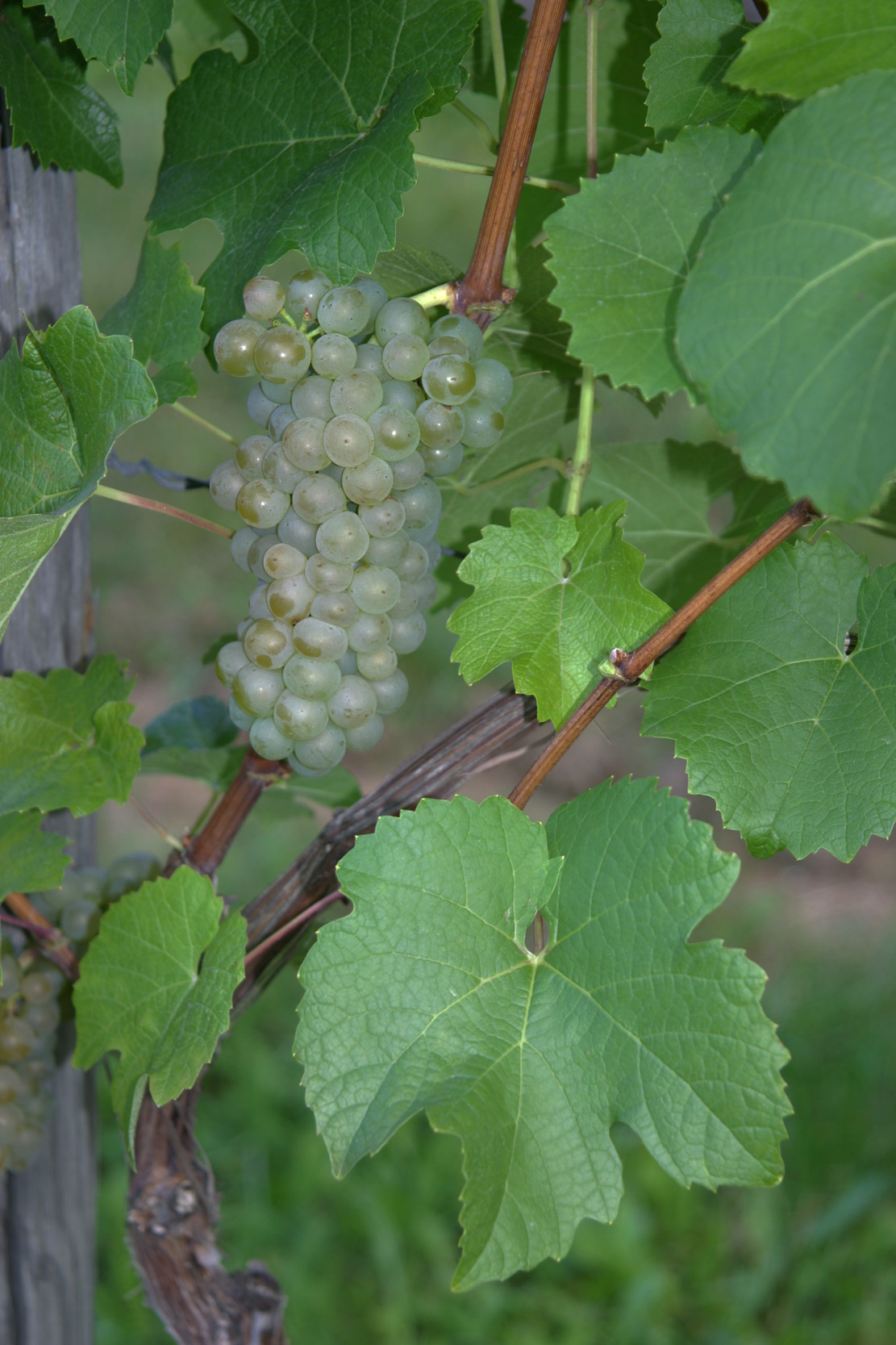
- Merzling grapes
- Species: Interspecific crossing
- Also called: FR 993-60
- Origin: Freiburg, Germany
- Notable regions: Germany
- VIVC number: 4251

Merzling is a white grape variety used for wine. It was bred in 1960 by Johannes Zimmermann at the viticultural institute in Freiburg, Germany by crossing Seyve-Villard 5276 with the cross Riesling × Pinot gris.

The variety was initially known under its breeding code FR 993-60, and was later named after Merzhausen, a location on the southern edge of Freiburg where some of the vineyards of the institute are located. It received varietal protection in 1993.

== Properties ==
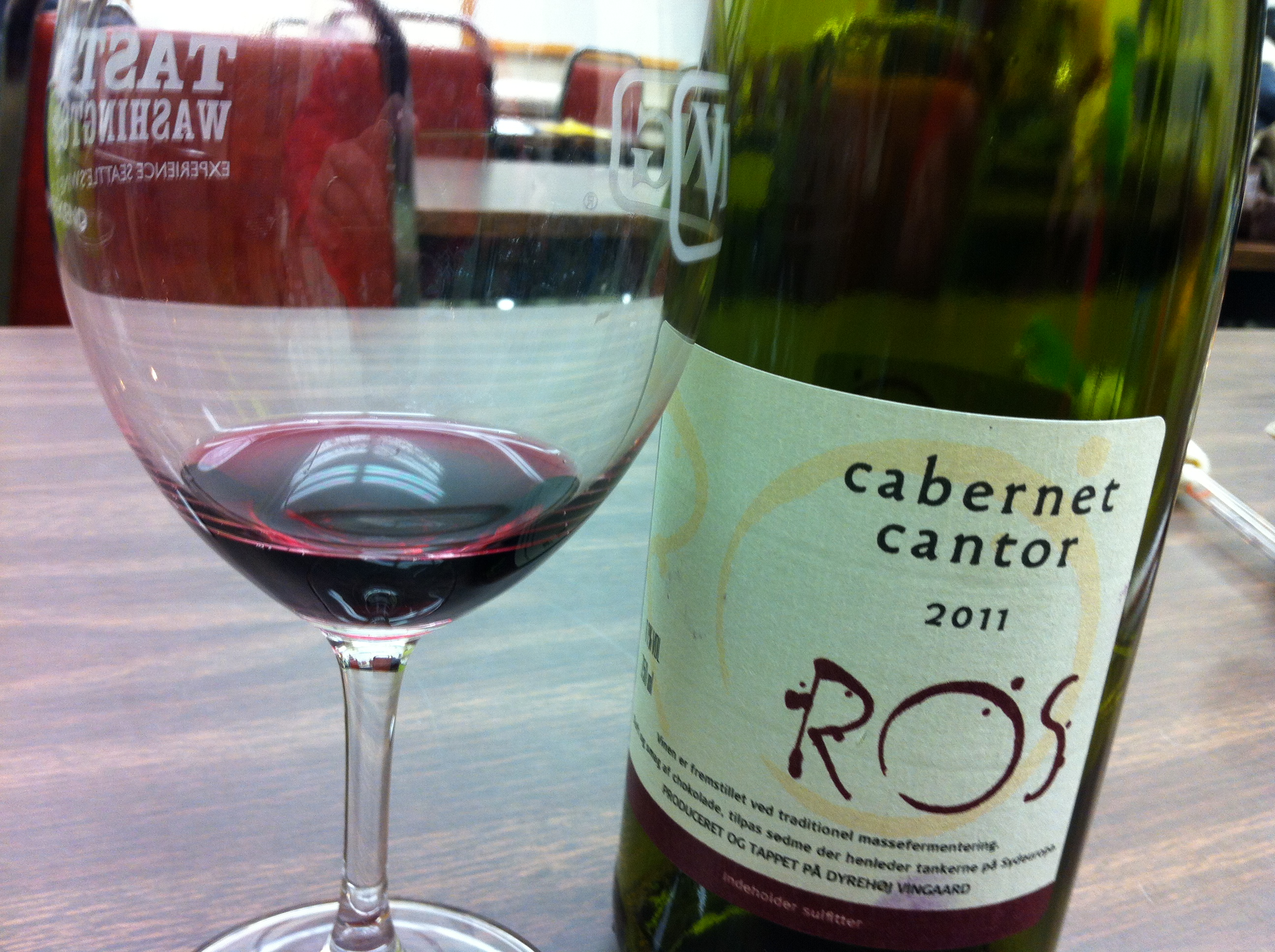
A Danish wine made from the Cabernet Cantor grape, an offspring of Merzling.

Merzling ripens early, gives high yields and shows good resistance against fungal diseases and spring frosts. Its wines are similar to those of Müller-Thurgau.

== Offspring ==
Due to its resistance against fungal diseases, Merzling and Merzling offspring has been used as a crossing partner for many other new crossings, including Baron, Bronner, Cabernet Cantor, Cabernet Carol, Cabernet Cortis, Helios, Monarch, Prior and Solaris.

== Synonyms ==
The only synonyms of Merzling are FR 993-60 or Freiburg 993-60.
