= Hibernal (grape) =

Variety of grape

- Grape (Vitis)
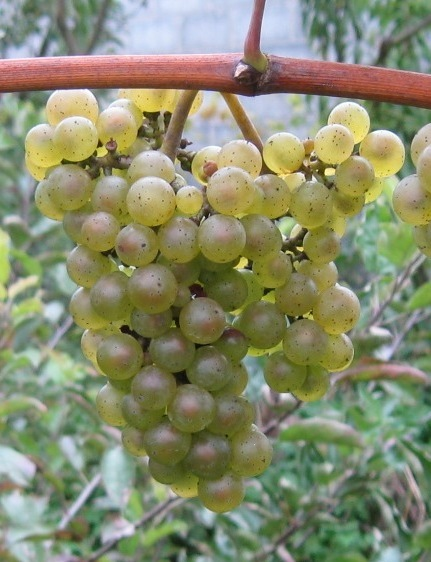
- Color of berry skin: Blanc
- Species: Vitis hybrid
- Also called: Geisenheim 322 58 (Gm 322 58)
- Origin: Germany
- Original pedigree: Seibel 7053 × Riesling clone 239
- Pedigree parent 1: Seibel 7053
- Pedigree parent 2: Riesling clone 239
- Notable wines: Hibernal
- VIVC number: 4711

Hibernal is a variety of white wine grape of the hybrid with Vitis vinifera which was developed in 1944, by Heinrich Birk at the Geisenheim Grape Breeding Institute. The variety is a genetic crossbreed of the Seibel 7053 and Riesling clone 239 grape varieties. Hibernal has had plant variety protection since 1977 and was included on the list of varieties in 1999.

Hibernal was developed for the same reasons as other new varieties developed by the Geisenheim Institute, such as Ehrenbreitsteiner, Dakapo, Rondo and Saphira. The basic idea was to develop pest and fungus-resistant vines. In bad years Hibernal is susceptible to mildew (powdery mildew and downy mildew) and must be provided with 1-2 sulphur treatments shortly before and/or shortly after flowering. The variety, however, has a very good winter hardiness even against stronger frosts.

The full-bodied and racy wine produced has a taste at times similar to a Scheurebe. The variety is particularly important in South East Europe.

== See also ==
- German wine
- List of grape varieties
