= Norbert Becker (agroscientist) =

German agricultural scientist (1937–2012)

Norbert J. Becker (9 July 1937, Wiesbaden – 7 May 2012, Freiburg im Breisgau) was a German agricultural scientist, specializing in vine breeding and viticulture.

== Early life ==
Becker spent his youth on a vineyard near Wiesbaden in the Rheingau. While still at secondary school he helped out there and as a waiter in the vineyard‘s inn, became used to the aura of Rhineland wine culture. After his school years at the humanistic Dilthey-Gymnasium in Wiesbaden (in 1958), he completed his military service as an officer candidate. He was for two years an apprentice in practical agriculture and then studied agricultural science at the Justus-Liebig-University in Gießen, obtaining a diploma in 1964.

Becker was an assistant at the Orcharding Institute of the same university and a doctoral student at the Forschungsanstalt Geisenheim (Geisenheim Research Institute) where he obtained the degree Dr. agr. in 1968. He then started as a trainee at the State Ministry of Agriculture in Hessen.

== Career ==
At the beginning of 1970 he entered service with the state of Baden-Württemberg at the Federal Institute of Viticulture in Freiburg (Staatlichen Weinbauinstitut Freiburg.) His area of work involved vine cultivation (Rebenzüchtung) and viticulture. During his tenure fungus-resistant new cultivars were developed (Reben-Neuzuchten), that can be grown practically without spraying (with fungicide). The most promising of these, and also those of his predecessor Johannes Zimmermann were tested in the institute‘s cultures, in vineyards (Winzerbetrieben) and then developed to the stage when they could be used in practice. Among these are the following vine types: Johanniter, Bronner, Solaris, Helios and the red wine types Prior, Baron, Monarch, Cabernet Cortis, Souvignier gris and Cabernet Carbon.

Becker taught viticulture students and master vintagers. In his spare time, he led Saturday viticulture excursions in the frame of the "general studies“ programme of the University of Freiburg. In retirement, he followed his work-oriented hobby – the cultural, historical and health aspects of wine.

== Selected publications ==
- Norbert Becker und H. Güss: Der Wein, Lebensfreude und Gesundheit. Ein weinfachlicher und ärztlicher Ratgeber für den gesundheitsdienlichen Weingenuss. 7. Auflage, (Wine, joie de vivre and health. Expert and medical advice for the healthy enjoyment of wine, 7th edition) Kehrer Verlag, Freiburg 1995, ISBN 3-929140-08-X
- Contributions to the viticulture textbooks Vogt/Götz: Weinbau, Ulmer-Verlag, Stuttgart 6th edition, 1977 und 7th edition 1987 and Vogt/Schruft: Weinbau, 8th edition, Ulmer-Verlag, Stuttgart 2000, ISBN 3-8001-5720-9
