= Schönburger =

Variety of grape

- Grape (Vitis)
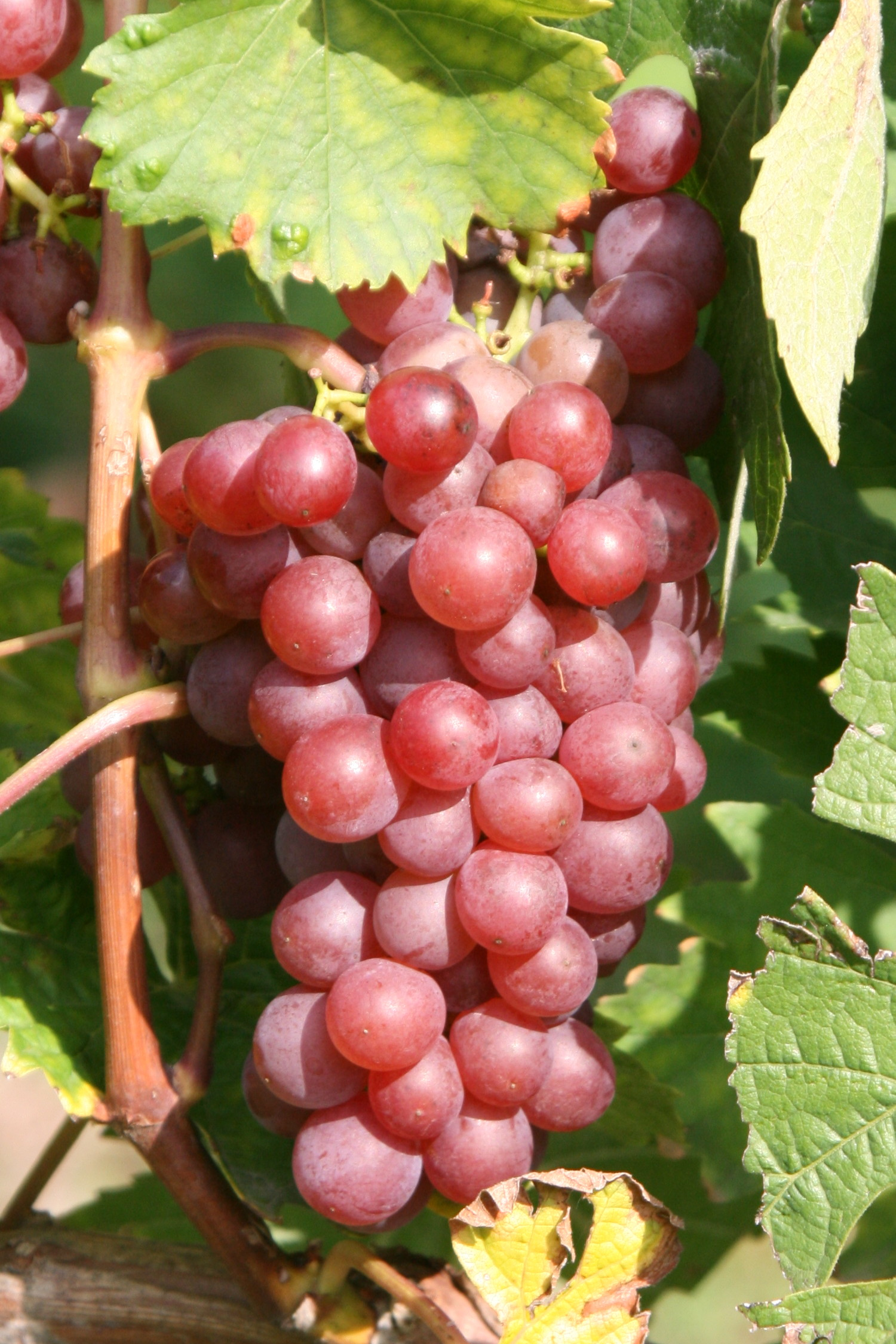
- Schönburger in Weinsberg
- Color of berry skin: Rose
- Species: Vitis vinifera
- Also called: Schoenburger
- Origin: Germany
- Notable regions: Germany, UK and United States
- Notable wines: Varietal wine
- VIVC number: 10833

Schönburger, also spelled Schoenburger, or Schonburger is a variety of grape, formally designated Geisenheim 15–114, a crossing developed at Geisenheim Institute for Grape Breeding in Germany, and released in 1979, of Pinot noir x (Chasselas x Muscat Hamburg).

Schönburger is grown now in Germany, as well as in England where it is gaining popularity in the early 2000s and is "authorized". It can also be found in British Columbia Canada, and in western Washington state, western Oregon state, USA. A common feature of these areas is a cool climate, often maritime influenced. This is a reliable early-ripening grape, though is susceptible to powdery mildew.

The wine produced is typically a soft while full and fruity white.

Also planted in Tasmania Australia and New Zealand. An early ripening grape very similar to Gewürztraminer. Beautiful eating grape, a vigorous grower.
