= Ehrenbreitsteiner =

Variety of grape

- Grape (Vitis)
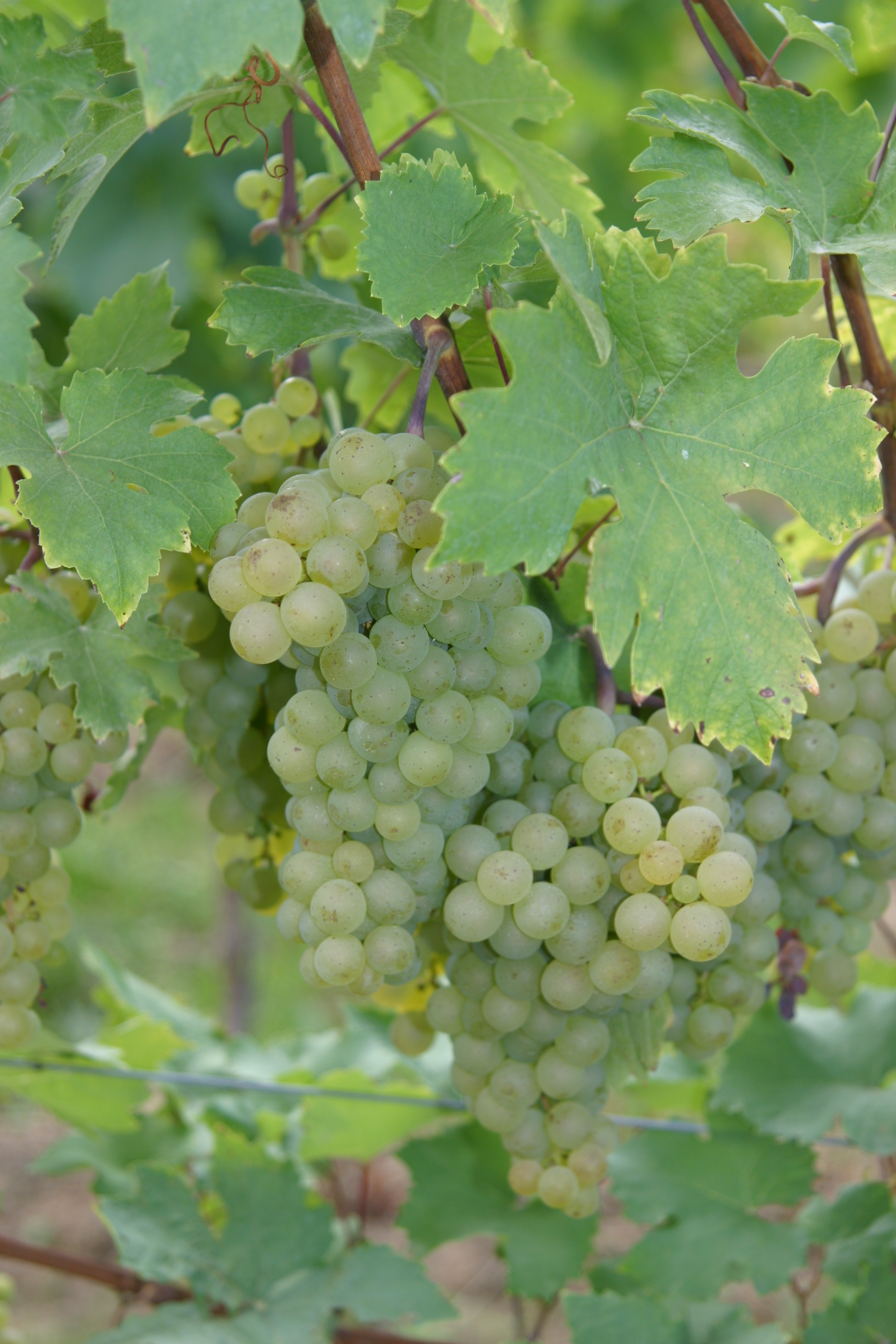
- Ehrenbreitsteiner grapes
- Color of berry skin: Blanc
- Species: Vitis vinifera
- Also called: Geisenheim 6414-36
- Origin: Geisenheim, Rheingau, Germany
- VIVC number: 4725

Ehrenbreitsteiner is a white wine grape variety of German origin. It was created by Helmut Becker at the Geisenheim Grape Breeding Institute in 1964, by crossing the varieties Ehrenfelser and Reichensteiner. It was granted plant variety rights in 1993 and was certified in 1994.

Ehrenbreitsteiner was created in a programme where Becker was searching for new grape varieties more resistant to phylloxera attacks and fungal diseases.

Since one of the parents, Ehrenfelser, was named after a fortress on the Rhine, Burg Ehrenfels, Ehrenbreitsteiner was named after another one with a similar name, Ehrenbreitstein Fortress, which also combines the names of the two parents Ehrenfelser and Reichestiner. The fortress itself has no connection to viticulture.

Ehrenbreitsteiner gives high crops due to a reliable fruit set, and is adaptable to many different soil types. Wines from Ehrenbreitsteiner are aromatic and high in acidity, and somewhat similar to those of Riesling.

Small amounts of Ehrenbreitsteiner are cultivated in Germany, Canada, Austria, Hungary and Italy, but the variety is not of major importance in any wine region.

== Synonyms ==
The only synonym for Ehrenbreitsteiner is its breeding code Geisenheim 6414-36 or Gm 6414-36.
