= Cabernet Cortis =

Variety of grape

- Grape (Vitis)
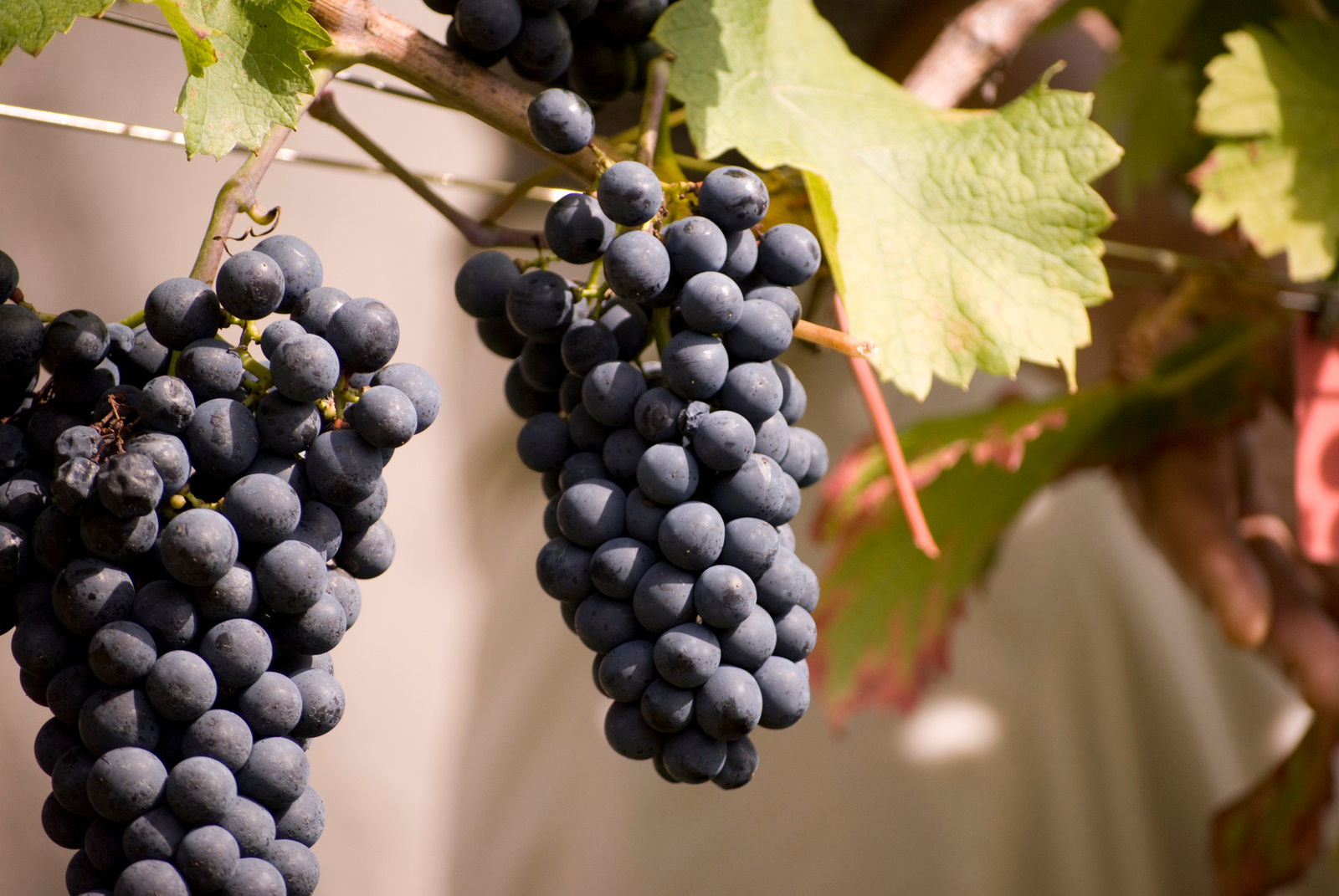
- Species: Vitis hybrid
- Also called: FR 437-82 r
- Origin: Freiburg, Germany
- Original pedigree: Cabernet Sauvignon x Solaris
- Pedigree parent 1: Cabernet Sauvignon
- Pedigree parent 2: Solaris
- Notable regions: German
- VIVC number: 20005

Cabernet Cortis is a dark-skinned grape variety used for wine. It was bred in 1982 by Norbert Becker at the viticultural institute in Freiburg, Germany as part of a programme searching for disease-resistant grape varieties. It received German varietal protection in 2003.

From 1999 to 2005, Cabernet Cortis and four other Freiburg-created varieties were evaluated in experimental plantations at Pully in the Lake Geneva region of Switzerland. Cabernet Cortis ripens early, is highly resistant to downy mildew and botrytis, but is sensitive to powdery mildew.

Cabernet Cortis yields highly coloured, tannic and intense wines with a herbal-vegetal character that are supposed to be Cabernet-styled.

== Pedigree ==
Becker created Cabernet Cortis by crossing Cabernet Sauvignon and Solaris. Thus, Cabernet Cortis is a hybrid grape, but is formally classified as a Vitis vinifera cultivar. Cabernet Carol is a full sibling sharing the same pedigree and was created at the same time.

== Synonyms ==
The only synonyms of Cabernet Cortis are FR 437-82 r or Freiburg 437-82 r.
