= Garanoir =

Variety of grape

- Grape (Vitis)
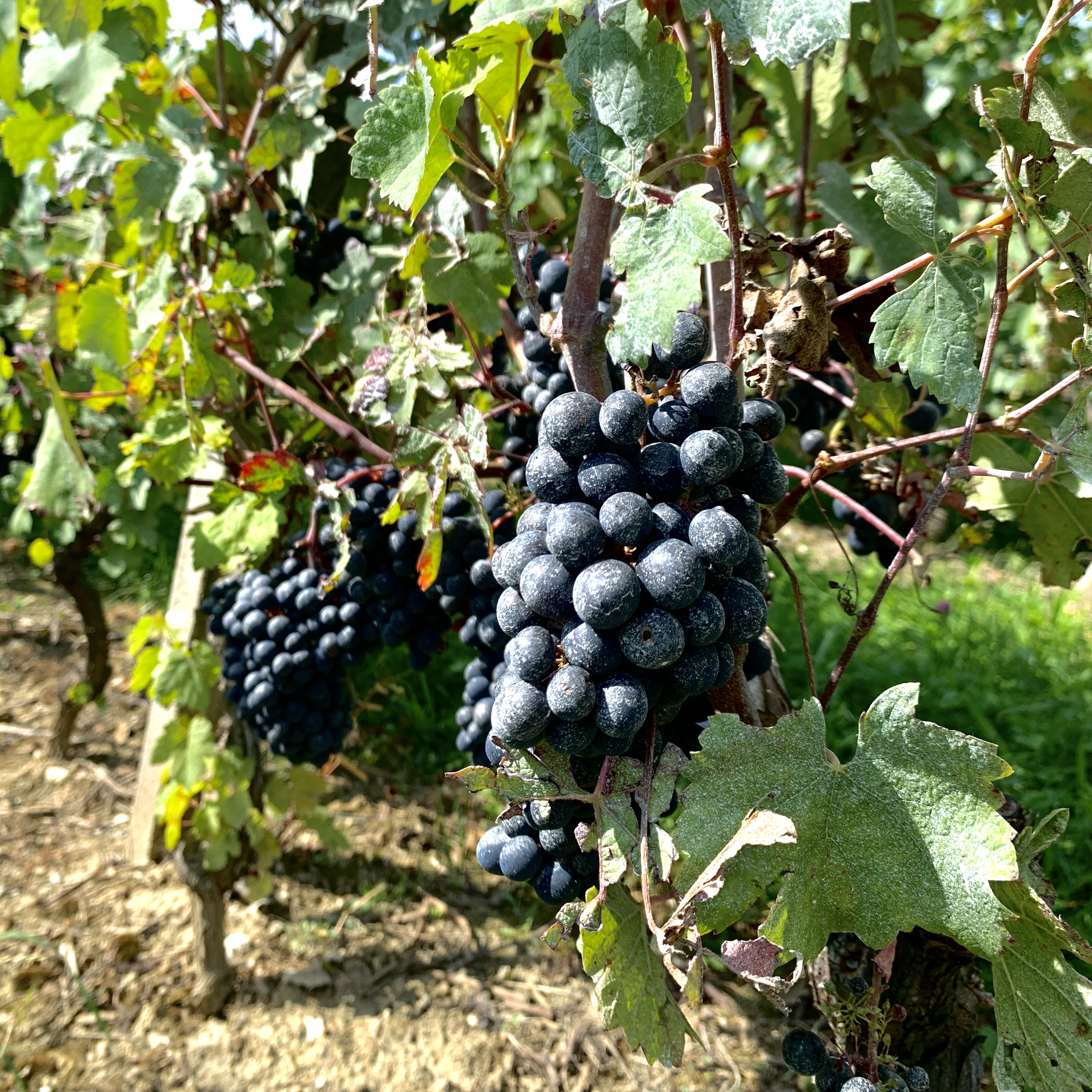
- Color of berry skin: Noir
- Species: Vitis vinifera
- Also called: see list of synonyms
- Origin: Switzerland
- VIVC number: 16870

Garanoir is a variety of red wine grape. It was created by André Jaquinet and Dominique Maigre at Station Fédérale de Recherches en Production Végétale de Changins in 1970 by crossing Gamay and Reichensteiner. Garanoir was developed for cultivation in German Switzerland, and is a full sibling of Gamaret, which was intended for the French part of the country.

Total Swiss plantations of the variety in 2009 stood at 203 hectares (500 acres). It is grown in both French and German Switzerland.

Garanoir has relatively good resistance to rot and ripens early. It gives dark purple wines, which are fruitier, lighter and less concentrated than those of Gamaret.

In 2023, based on the petition by Montifalco Vineyard in Monticello AVA in Virginia, USA Garanoir was registered as an acceptable grape variety designation for American wines with the Alcohol and Tobacco Tax and Trade Bureau.

== Synonyms ==
Garanoir is also known under the synonyms B-28, Gastar, Granoir, and Pully B-28.
