= Breidecker =

Variety of grape

- Grape (Vitis)
- Color of berry skin: Blanc
- Species: Interspecific crossing
- Also called: See list of synonyms
- Origin: Germany
- VIVC number: 1668

Breidecker is white variety of grape. It is a hybrid grape, an interspecific crossing (Riesling × Silvaner) × Seibel 7053. It can be used to make a German style light white wine with apple and pear flavors. "This cultivar was released by the Geisenheim Research Station, Germany, in 1962. Has the technical name GM 4894. It was derived from a Müller-Thurgau cross with the Chancellor (a.k.a. Seibel 7053) hybrid cultivar and can currently be found in limited areas in the South Island of New Zealand, where it is mainly used for producing somewhat neutral varietal and blend white wines. Resistant to bunch rot and downy mildew fungus diseases. Breidecker was named after Heinrich Breidecker, one of New Zealand pioneer grape growers."

== Synonyms ==
Breidecker is also known under the synonyms or breeding codes CD 4984, Geisenheim 4984, and Gm 49-84.
