= Helmut Becker =

German viticulturist (1927–1990)

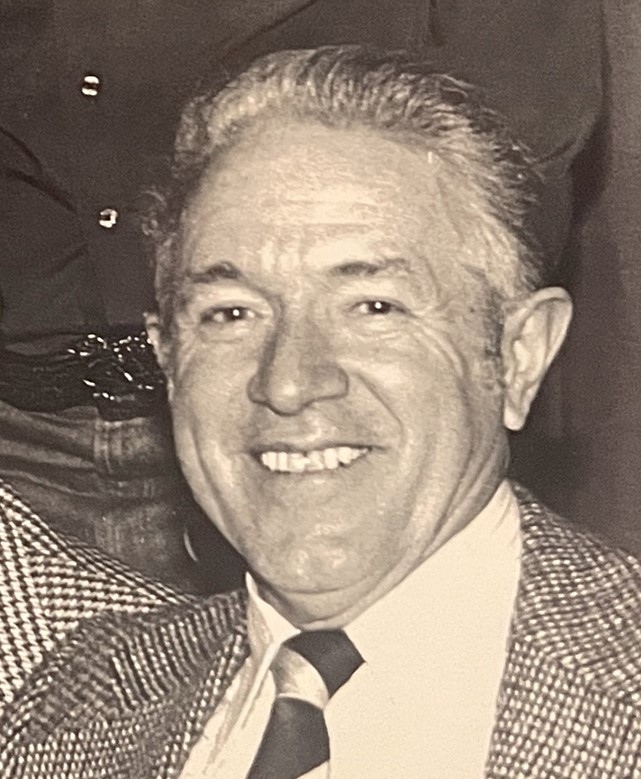
- Born: March 9, 1927; Germany
- Died: July 19, 1990 (aged 63)
- Education: doctorate
- Alma mater: University of Mainz
- Scientific career
- Thesis: The Biology of Phylloxera

Helmut Becker (German pronunciation: [ˈhɛlmuːt ˈbɛkɐ]; 8 March 1927 – 19 July 1990) was a German viticulturist and was chief of the Geisenheim Grape Breeding Institute.

He received his doctorate from the University of Mainz; the topic of his thesis was the biology of phylloxera. As a successor of Heinrich Birk, he viewed viticulture from a global perspective and promoted the globalization of a quality wine industry. Dr. Becker collaborated with numerous scientists around the world and encouraged the importation of important clones and varieties in New Zealand, Canada, Australia, Japan and other countries. He did early important work in Neustadt/Weinstrasse during the 1950s and 1960s in the European phylloxera eradication program.

Some of the grape varieties bred by Helmut Becker at the Research Institute Geisenheim:

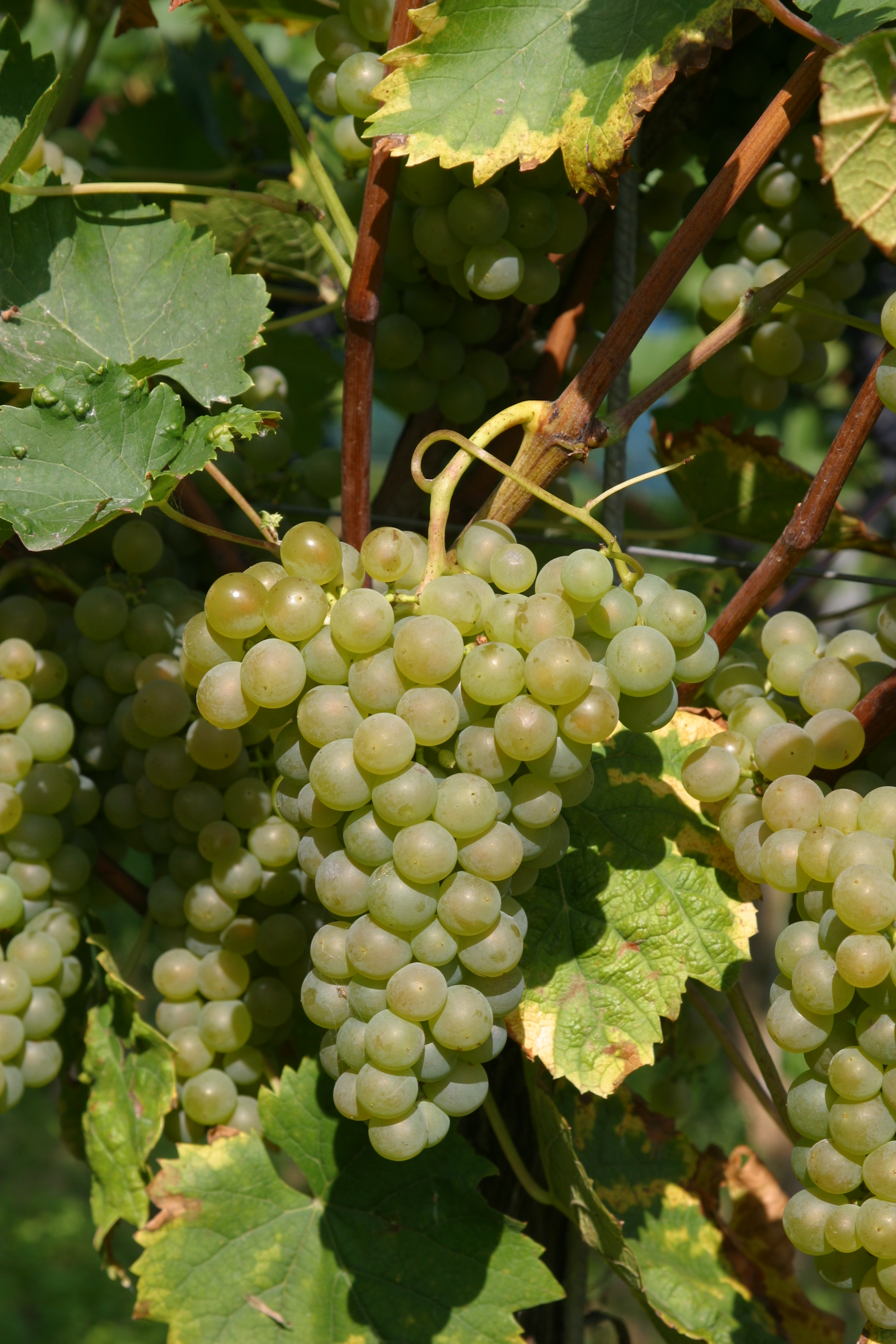
Saphira

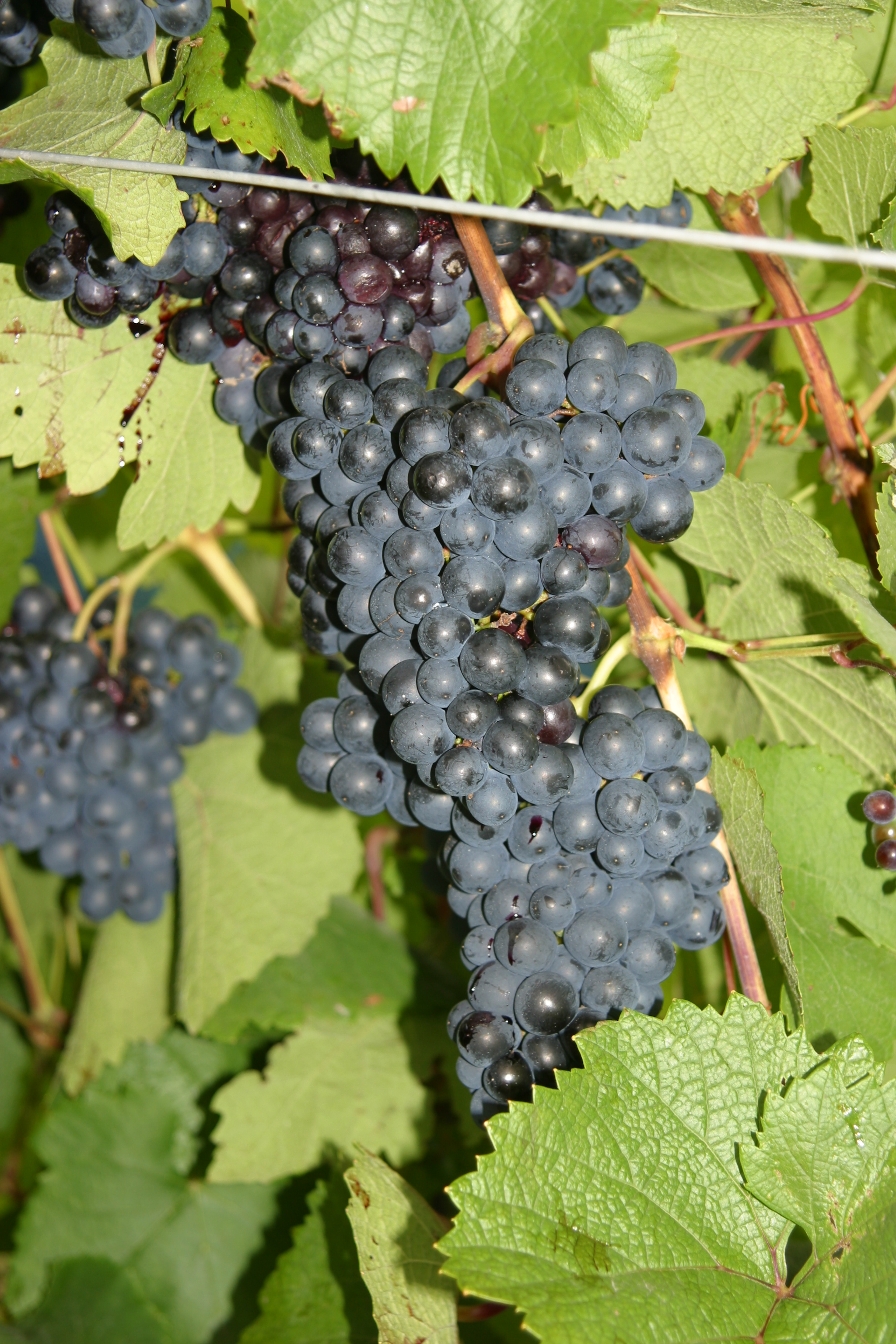
Rondo

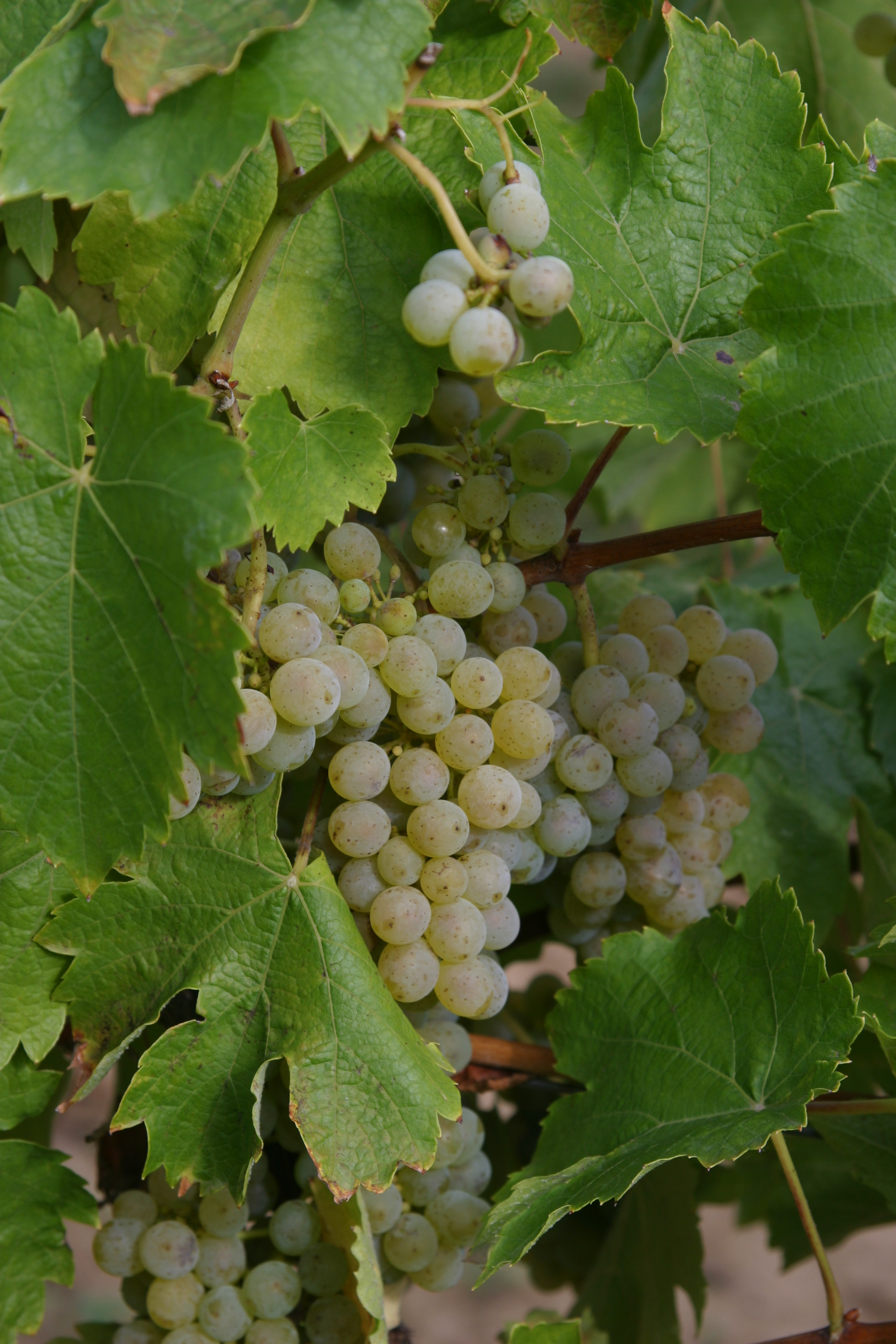
Prinzipal

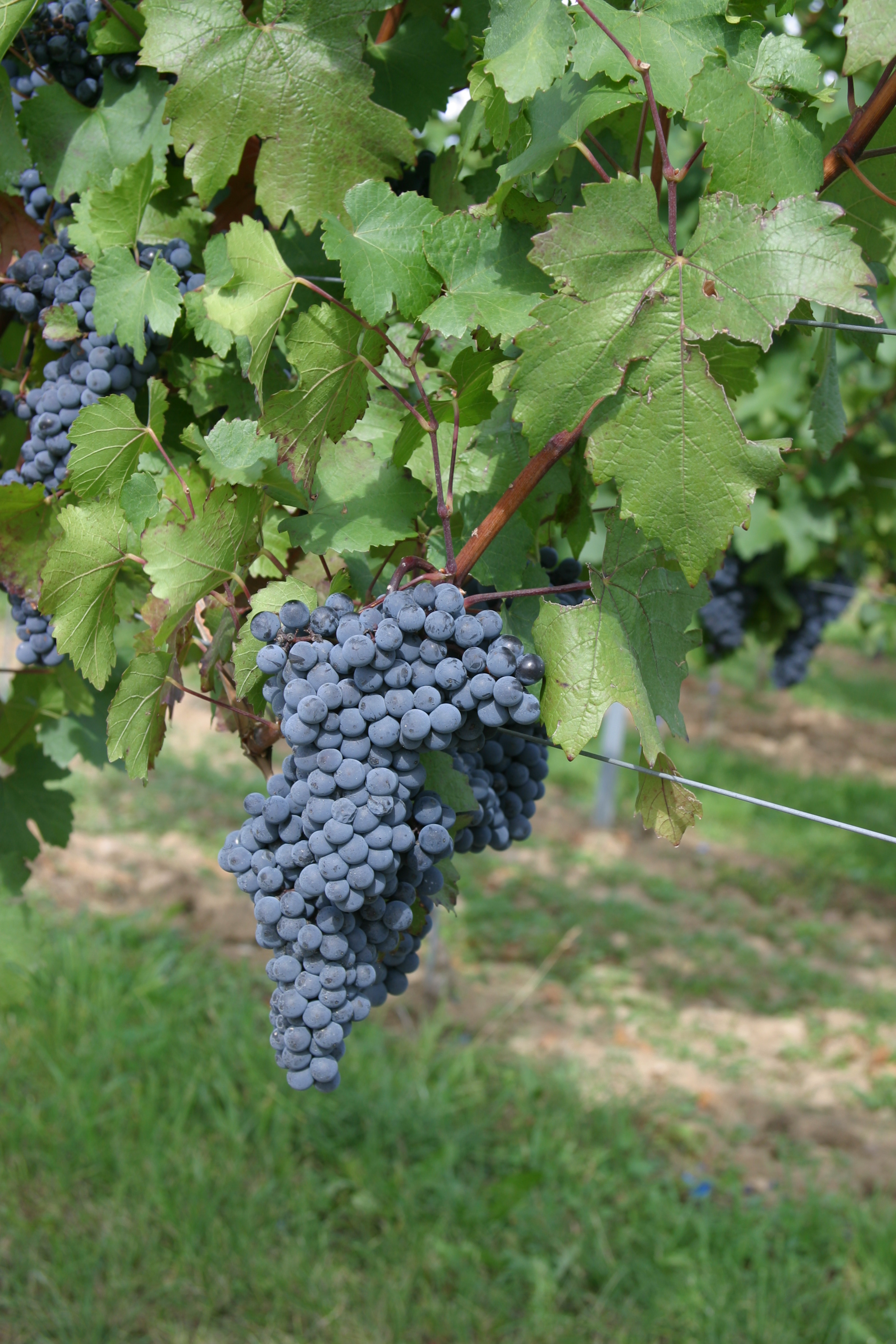
Dakapo

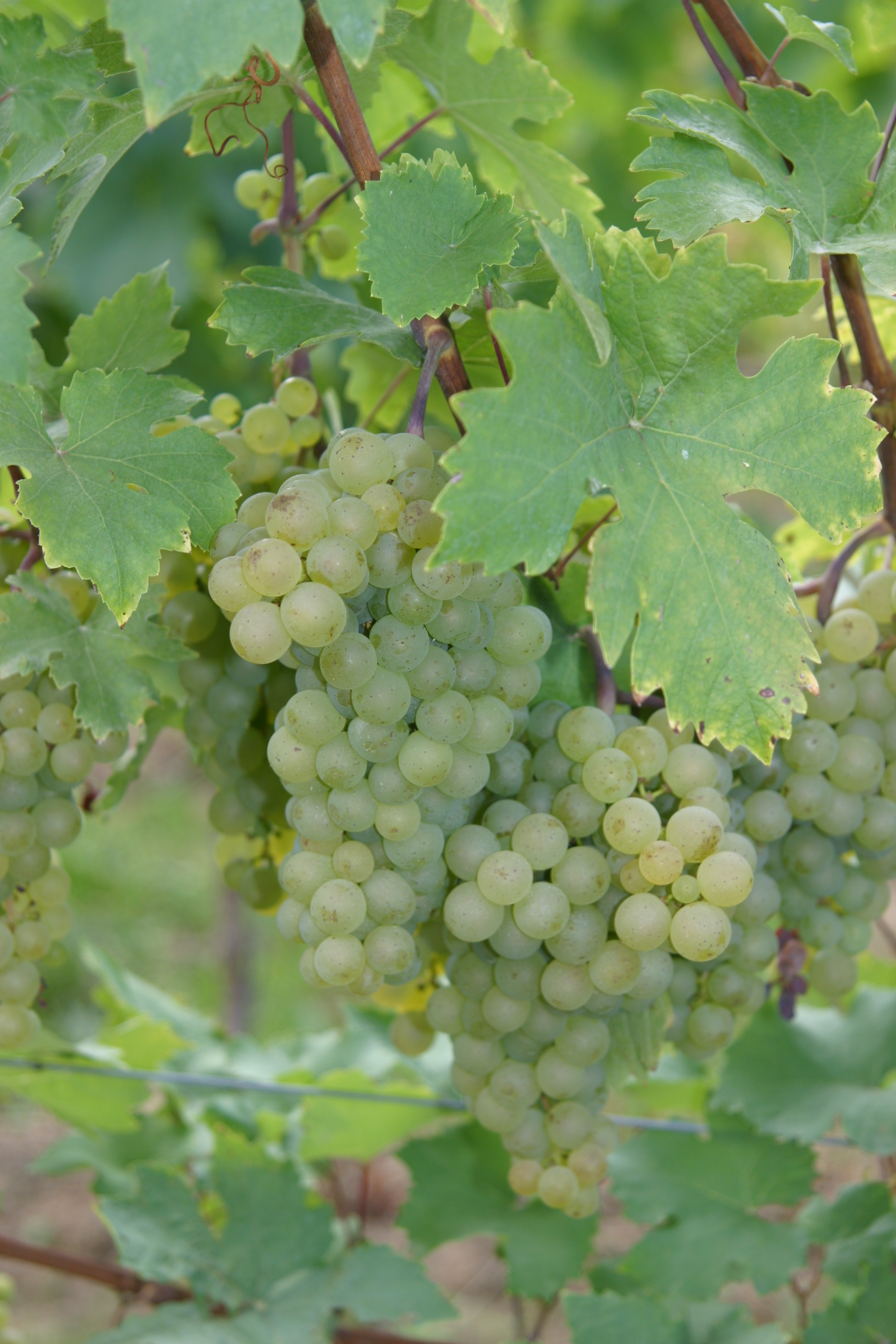
Ehrenbreitsteiner

== See also ==
- German wine
- List of wine personalities
