= Reichensteiner =

Variety of grape

- Grape (Vitis)
- Color of berry skin: Blanc
- Species: Vitis vinifera
- Origin: Germany
- Original pedigree: Müller-Thurgau × (Madeleine Angevine × Weißer Calabreser)
- Breeder: H. Birk
- Breeding institute: Forschungsanstalt Geisenheim, Fachgebiet Rebenzüchtung und Rebenveredlung
- Year of crossing: 1939
- VIVC number: 10004

Reichensteiner is a white wine grape that is mainly grown in Germany (106 hectares (260 acres) (2008 fig.)), England (85.38 hectares (211.0 acres) (2010 fig.)), and New Zealand (72 hectares (180 acres) (2009 fig.)). It is a cross between Müller-Thurgau and Madeleine Angevine x Calabreser Froehlich, and was first bred in Germany during 1939.

In England, it is the 5th most grown variety after Chardonnay, Pinot noir, Bacchus, and Seyval blanc (2010 fig.).

It is quite high in sugars, so is suited to cooler climates, and is suitable for making both sparkling and still wines, but often needs blending with other varieties as it does not add much flavor.

It has been used to breed Garanoir (Gamay noir x Reichensteiner) and Ehrenbreitsteiner.
