= Geisenheim Grape Breeding Institute =

German research institute

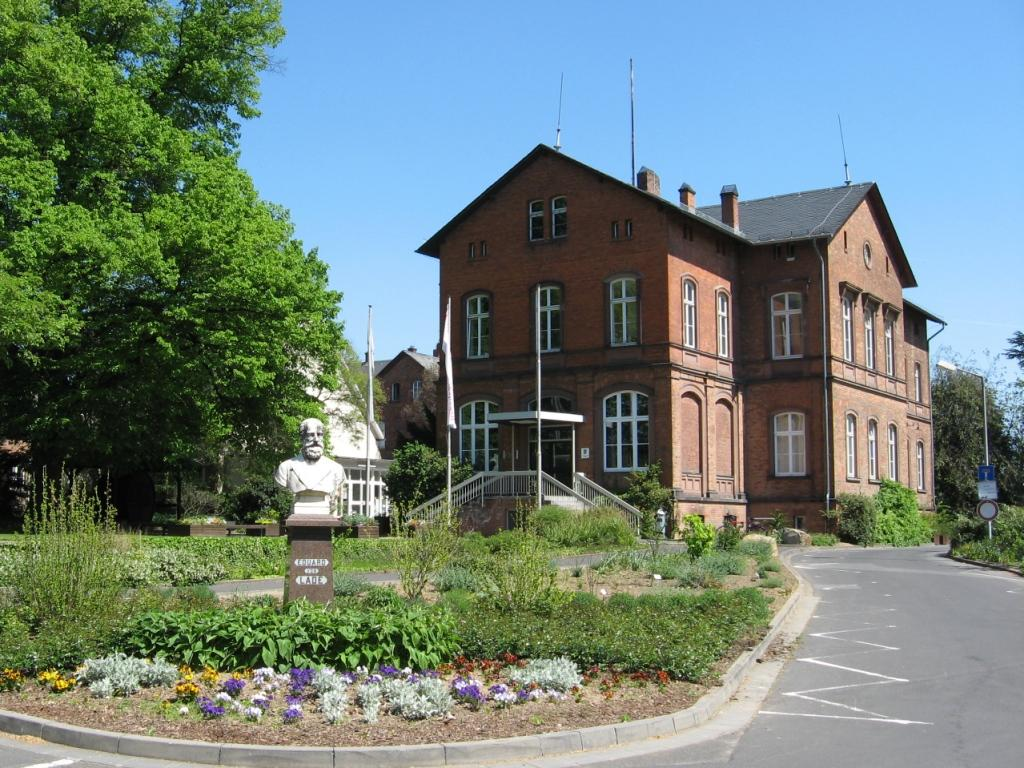
- Building of the Geisenheim Grape Breeding Institute
- Location: 49°59′03″N 7°57′41″E
- Location within Germany

The Geisenheim Grape Breeding Institute was founded in 1872 and is located in the town of Geisenheim, in Germany's Rheingau region. In 1876 Swiss-born professor Hermann Müller joined the institute, where he developed his namesake grape variety Müller-Thurgau, which became Germany's most-planted grape variety in the 1970s. Professor Helmut Becker worked at the institute from 1964 until his death in 1989.

== Academic Grade ==
Geisenheim is the only German institution to award higher academic degrees in winemaking. Formally, undergraduate level viticulture and enology, ending with a bachelor's degree in engineering is awarded by the University of Applied Sciences in Wiesbaden, and the newly introduced master's degree is awarded by the Giessen University.

== Breeds ==
- White: Müller-Thurgau, Arnsburger, Ehrenfelser, Saphira, Reichensteiner, Ehrenbreitsteiner, Prinzipal, Osteiner, Witberger, Schönburger, Primera, Rabaner, Hibernal
- Red: Rotberger, Dakapo
- Improvements: Rondo, Orléans, Dunkelfelder

== See also ==
- Wine
- German wine
- Geilweilerhof Institute for Grape Breeding
