= Wines of Great Britain =

- Wines of Great Britain Ltd
- Abbreviation: Wine GB
- Formation: 1 September 2017
- Merger of: English Wine Producers Limited; United Kingdom Vineyard Association
- Type: Trade association
- Purpose: To protect and promote wine production in England and Wales
- Headquarters: Harborough Innovation Centre, Airfield Business Park, Market Harborough, England, LE16 7WB
- Origins: England; Wales
- Products: English Wine; Welsh Wine
- Members: 624
- C.E.O: Nicola Bates
- Chairman: Simon Robinsong
- Deputy Chairman: Peter Gladwin
- Website: https://winegb.co.uk/

Wines of Great Britain is a trade association that protects and promotes wine in England and Wales.

== History ==
On 1 September 2017, English Wine Producers Limited and the United Kingdom Vineyard Association merged to form Wines of Great Britain.

=== United Kingdom Vineyards Association ===
The United Kingdom Vineyards Association (UKVA) was the trade association of English and Welsh vineyards that represented the vast majority of the UK's vineyards. It was a UK government recognised industry body that formed in the late 1990s. The United Kingdom Vineyard Association had six regional associations. Each June it held the English and Welsh Wine of the Year competition. It published The Grape Press every six months. The regional associations were:

- The East Anglian Wine Growers Association
- Mercian Vineyards Association
- South East Vineyards Association
- South West Vineyards Association
- Thames and Chilterns Vineyards Association
- Wessex Vineyards Association

=== Post-merge ===
On 3 April 2023 Simon Thorpe stepped down as C.E.O of Wines of Great Britain.

On 30 October 2023 Nicola Bates was appointed as C.E.O of Wines of Great Britain.

== Sustainable Wines of GB ==
On 10 July 2020 Wines of Great Britain launched a wine environmental sustainability program the Sustainable Wines of Great Britain (SWGB).

On 16 August 2021 Wine of Great Britain released a list of the first wines to receive Sustainable Wines of Great Britain certification, these 10 wines include:

- Gusbourne: Guinevere Chardonnay 2019, Pinot Noir 2019, Pinot Noir Rosé 2020
- Henners: Vineyard Gardner Street Rosé 2020
- Three Choirs: Sparkling, White, Rosé, Red
- Yotes Court: On the Nod Bacchus 2020, Best Turned-Out Pinot Meunier Rosé 2020

== Manifesto for Growth ==
On 3 February 2025 Wines of Great Britain released a Manifesto for Growth which outlined the goals Wines of GB, this include areas such as the domestic market , Tourism, Exports, Environment, Sustainability, labelling and production protection.

== Events ==
=== British wine event at Westminster ===
On 1 May 2024 the MP for Meon Valley Flick Drummond hosted a British wine event at Westminster to celebrate and promote wine in Great Britain including English wine, this was in cooperation with Wines GB.

=== English Wine Week ===
On 11 April 2025 Wines GB announced the launch of English Wine Week, with the first event being held between 15 and 23 April 2024.

== See also ==
- English Sparkling Wine
- Sussex wine
- Wine and Spirit Trade Association
- Wine from the United Kingdom
