= Independent English Wine Awards =

Annual wine competition

The Independent English Wine Awards (IEWA) is an annual wine competition that looks for the best wine in England.

The Independent English Wine Awards are based in Bristol, England.

The Judging panel consists of 24 judges and is chaired by Master of Wine Liam Steevenson. The panel blind taste each wine and decide on the winners, awarding gold, silver and bronze medals where appropriate.

== History ==
The Independent English Wine Awards was founded by Alex Taylor (Wine Taste Bristol) in 2016 to raise awareness, inform and engage consumers and promote the sales of English wine. The inaugural awards was held in March 2017.

As of 2025 the Independent English Wine Awards has been going for nine years.

== Results ==
=== 2017 ===
On March 17, 2017 the results of the inaugural Independent English Wine Awards 2017 were released.

- Sugrue Pierre - Trouble with Dream 2013, West Sussex
- Bacchus - Lyme Bay 2015, Devon
- Tuffon Hall - Bacchus 2015, Essex

=== 2018 ===
On March 27, 2018 the results for the Independent English Wine Awards 2018 were released:

2018 (Gold)
Sparkling Wine	Still Wine
Overall winner - Langham Rosé Brut 2014	Overall Winner - Stopham Estate Pinot Gris 2015
Cottonworth Rosé 2014	Giffords Hall Bacchus 2016
Astley Vineyard Sparkling Kerner 2014	Hidden Spring Bacchus 2016
Hattingley Valley Sparkling Rosé 2014	Lyme Bay Pinot Noir 2016
Jenkyn Place Classic Cuvée 2014	News Hall Bacchus Fumée 2016
Langham Classic Rosé 2014	Tuffons Hall Pinot Noir Rosé 2016
Laverstoke Park Vintage Brut 2010	
Wiston Estate Blanc de Blancs NV

=== 2019 ===
On April 4, 2019 the results for the Independent English Wine Awards 2019 were released:

2019 (Gold)
Sparkling Wine	Still Wine	Sweet Wine
Overall winner - Wiston Estate Cuvée Brut NV	Overall Winner - Stopham Estate Pinot Gris 2017	Denbies The Brokes Botrytis Ortega 2016
Breaky Bottom Cuvée Oliver Minkley 2011	Blackbook Chardonnay 2017	
Chartham Blanc de Blancs 2016	Fenny Castle Barrel Fermented Ortega 2017	
Cottonworth Sparkling Rosé Brut NV	Lyme Bay Chardonnay 2016	
Denbies Greenfields NV	Oatley Elizabeth’s 2015	
Fenny Castle Blanc de Noirs 2015	Oatley Fraicheur Barrel Matured 2016	
Hawkins Bros. Brut Reserve 2014	Polgoon Sauvignon Blanc 2018	
Langham Rosé NV		
Laverstoke Park Classic Cuvee 2013
Lyme bay Classic Cuvee 2015
Fox & Fox Inspiration 2014
Fox & Fox Pinot Meunier 2014
Wiston Estate Cuvée Brut 2009
Woodchurch Rosé Brut 2015

=== 2020 ===
On September 14, 2020 the results for the Independent English Wine Awards 2020 were released:

2020 (Gold)
Sparkling Wine	Still Wine
Overall winner - Black Chalk Classic 2016	Overall Winner - Stopham Pinot Blanc 2018
Furleigh Estate Classic Cuvée 2014	Forty Hall Bacchus 2018
Fox & Fox Essence Blanc de Blancs 2015	Furleigh Estate Bacchus Fumé NV
Swanaford Sparkling Rosé 2018	New Hall Bacchus Fumé NV
Tickerage Blanc de Blancs 2011	Oastbrook Pinot Gris 2018
Tickerage Blush 2013	Poynings Grange Bacchus 2015
	Stopham Pinot Gris 2019
	Tuffon Hall Bacchus 2019
	Whitehall Bacchus 2019

=== 2021 ===
On September 22, 2021 the results for the Independent English Wine Awards 2021 were released:

2021 (Gold)
Sparkling Wine	Still Wine
Overall winner - D’Urberville Vineyard Extra Brut 2016	Overall Winner - Oastbrook Estate Chardonnay Oak 2020
Coolhurst Lady Elizabeth Rosé 2016	Fenny Castle Rosé Pinot Noir 2020
Dunesforde Blanc de Noir 2018	Folc Rosé 2020
D’Urberville Vineyard Rosé 2018	Giffords Hall Pinot Noir 2019
Furleigh Estate Blanc de Noirs 2014	Heppington Chardonnay 2020
Hunter Brut 2018	Hidden Spring Chardonnay 2019
Louis Pommery Classic Cuvée NV	Tuffon Hall Bacchus 2020
The Grange Classic Cuvée 2016 Magnum	Whitehall Vineyard Pinot Noir 2019
Swanaford Classic Cuvée 2018	

=== 2022 ===
On May 12, 2022 the results for the Independent English Wine Awards 2022 were released:

2022 (Gold)
Sparkling Wine	Still Wine
Overall winner - Bride Valley Blanc de Blancs 2018	Overall Winner - The Wharie Experience Pinot Gris 2020
Albury Blanc de Noirs 2018	New Hall Chardonnay 2018
Breaky Bottom Cuvée Sir Andrew Davis Noir 2017	The Wharie Experience Orange Bacchus 2020
Fairmile Classic Cuvée NV	Wythall Estate Pinot Noir 2019
Forty Hall Classic Cuvée 2018	
Fox & Fox Pinot Meunier 2014
The Grange Pink NV
Winding Wood Brut Rosé 2018

=== 2023 ===
On May 12, 2023 the results for the Independent English Wine Awards 2023 were released:

2023 (Gold)
Sparkling Wine	Still Wine
Overall winner - Busi Jacobsohn Blanc de Noirs 2018	Overall Winner(s) - Oastbrook Pinot Blanc 2022 Biddenden Gamay Noir 2022.
Adnams Classic Cuvée 2017	Tuffon Hall Bacchus 2022
Artelium Nature Series Cuvée 2017	Welcombe Hills Sauvignon Bacchus 2022
Bride Valley Blanc de Blancs 2018	
Chilcomb Valley Rosé Brut NV
Furleigh Estate Classic Cuvée 2016
Godstone Seyval Blanc 2020
Hunter Classic Cuvée 2020
Minerva Classic Cuvée 2019
Oastbrook Brut Cuvée 2014
The Mount Vineyard Sparkling White 2018
Woodchurch Classic Cuvée 2017

=== 2024 ===
On June 10, 2024 the results for the Independent English Wine Awards 2024 were released:

2024 (Gold)
Sparkling Wine	Still Wine
Overall winner - Winding Wood Brut Rosé 2020	Overall Winner(s) - Burn Valley Vineyard Chardonnay 2023
Aldwick Seyval Jubilate 2020 Henners Rosé NV	Cobble Hill Bacchus Special Reserve 2023
English Oak Quercus Blanc de Blancs 2020	For the Heretics Pale Rosé 2023
Henners Rosé NV	Vagabond Dios Mio Bacchus 2022
Hidden Spring Classic Cuvée 2019	Vagabond Solena Orange Ortega NV

=== 2025 ===
On June 9, 2025 the results for the Independent English Wine Awards 2025 were released:

2025 (Gold)
Sparkling Wine	Still Wine
Hungerhill Col Fondo 2023 (Overall winner); Vagabond X Artelium Nature Series Cuvée 2018; Chilcomb Valley Rosé Brut 2022	Vagabond Solena 003 NV (Overall winner); Giffords Hall Bacchus 2024; Kingsthorne Rosé 2023; Stopham Barrel Fermented Pinot Blanc 2022; Vagabond Night Tripper 2023; Wharie Project Orange Bacchus 2023

== See also ==
- Sussex wine
- English sparkling wine
