= Wine from the United Kingdom =

Wine making in the United Kingdom

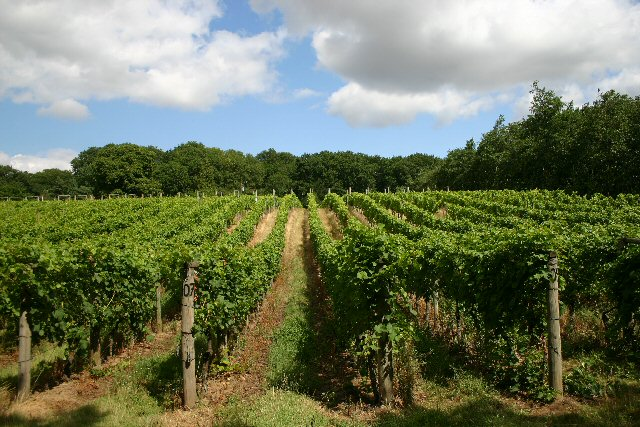
A vineyard at Wyken Hall, near Langham, Suffolk

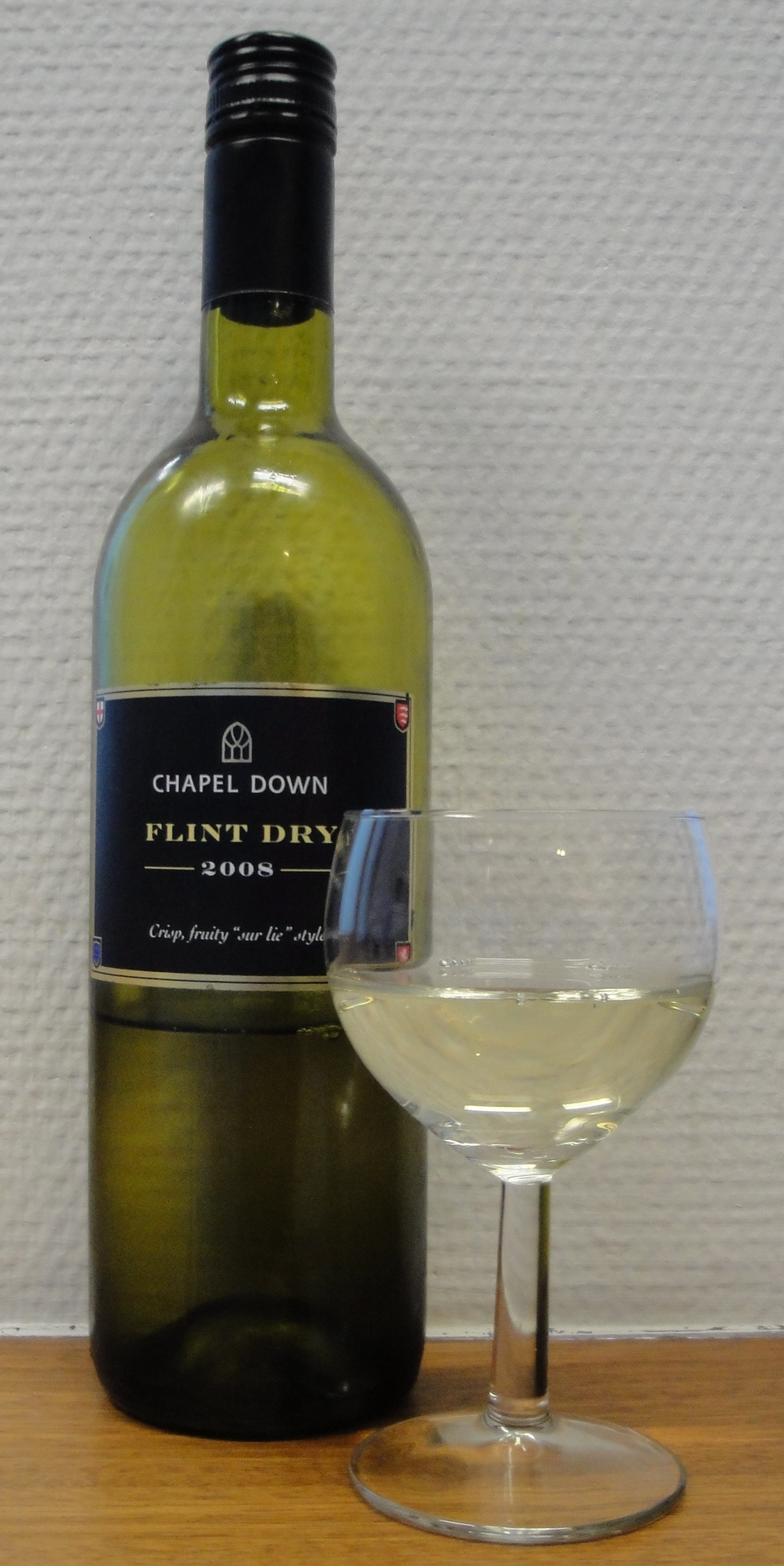
A wine produced from vineyards in Kent

The United Kingdom is a major consumer of wine, although a minor grower and producer. Wine production in the UK has historically been perceived as less than ideal due to the cool climate, but warmer summers and grapes adapted to these conditions have played a role in increasing investment and sale of wines. Most is English sparkling wine, from vineyards across Southern England. Vineyards are becoming common in counties such as Essex, Sussex and Kent, where more varieties of wine can be produced due to the drier and warmer climate.

== Geography ==
=== Wine from England ===
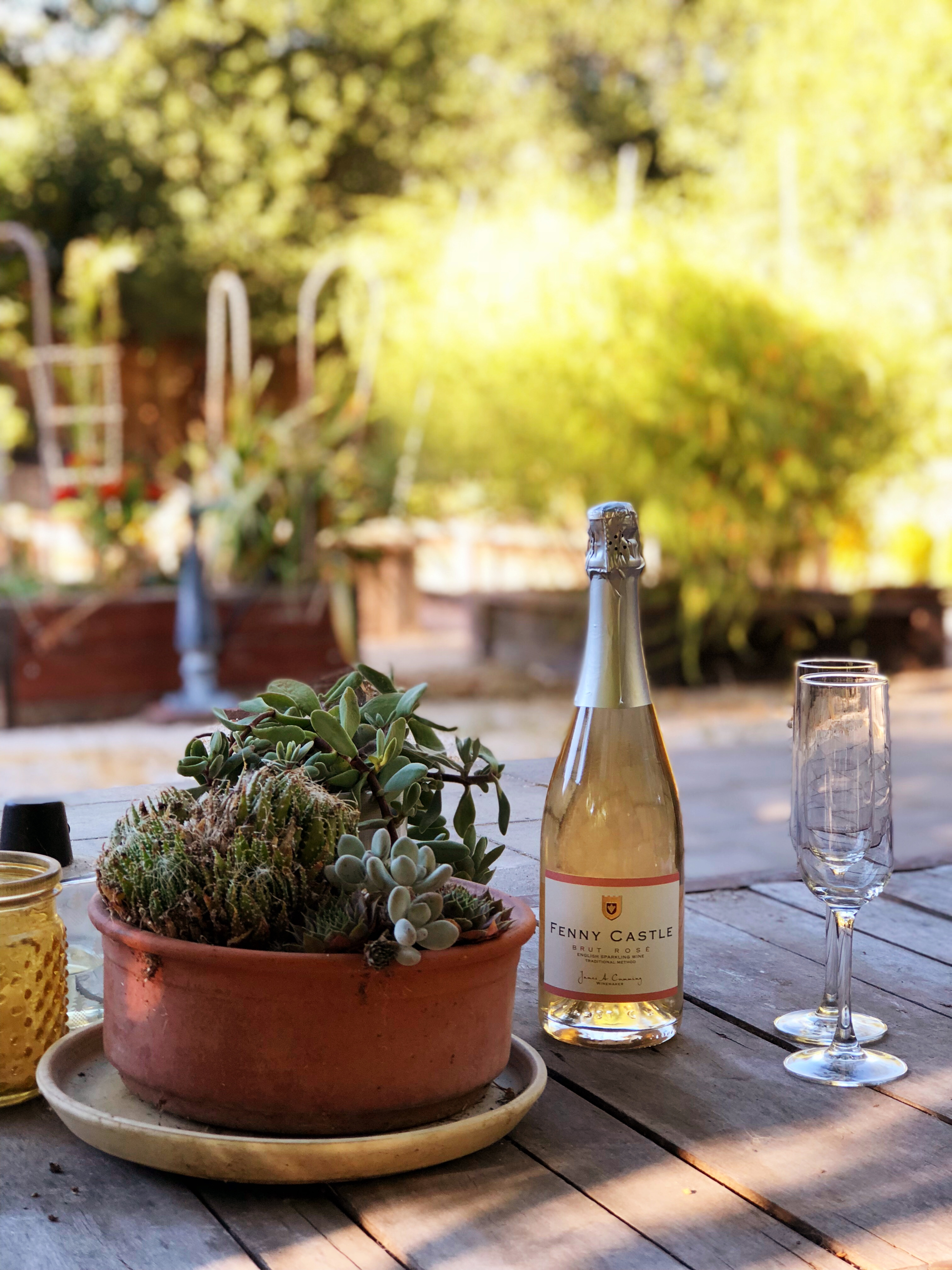
A bottle of sparkling rosé from Fenny Castle in Somerset

There are currently 1100+ commercial vineyards across England. All regions of England and Wales have vineyards and many are suitable for growing the grapes used to produce sparkling wine, and, particularly on south-facing slopes, the climate, at least in recent years, is warm enough. At the last official count, the Wine Standards Board reported that there were just over 450 vineyards producing wine throughout England. The largest of these is Chapel Down in Kent, as of mid-2018 when they became the largest winery and vineyard in England in terms of production.. As of 2026, Denbies Estate in Surrey is the largest in terms of size, with 107 hectares of vines.

- English wine is registered as a Protected Designation of Origin (PDO) in the EU and the UK. The term may only be used for wine produced in conformation of the standards and using grapes grown in England at a maximum altitude of 220 m above sea level.
- English regional wine is registered as a Protected Geographical Indication (PGI) in the EU and the UK. The designation is limited to wine produced from grapes grown in England, although production does not have to be within a certain area. The product must conform to restrictions regarding alcohol content, acidification and sweetening.
- Sussex wine is registered as a Protected Designation of Origin in the UK. It is limited to wine produced from grapes grown in Sussex. The wine should consist mainly of Chardonnay, Pinot Noir, Pinot Meunier grapes, normally produced at 12 tonnes per hectares (with a maximum of 14 tonnes per hectare). The wine is available as a still wine and a sparkling wine.

The most northerly commercially producing vineyard is near Malton, Yorkshire.

"English wine" is also a common generic term used in India meaning "Western spirits".

=== Wine from Wales ===
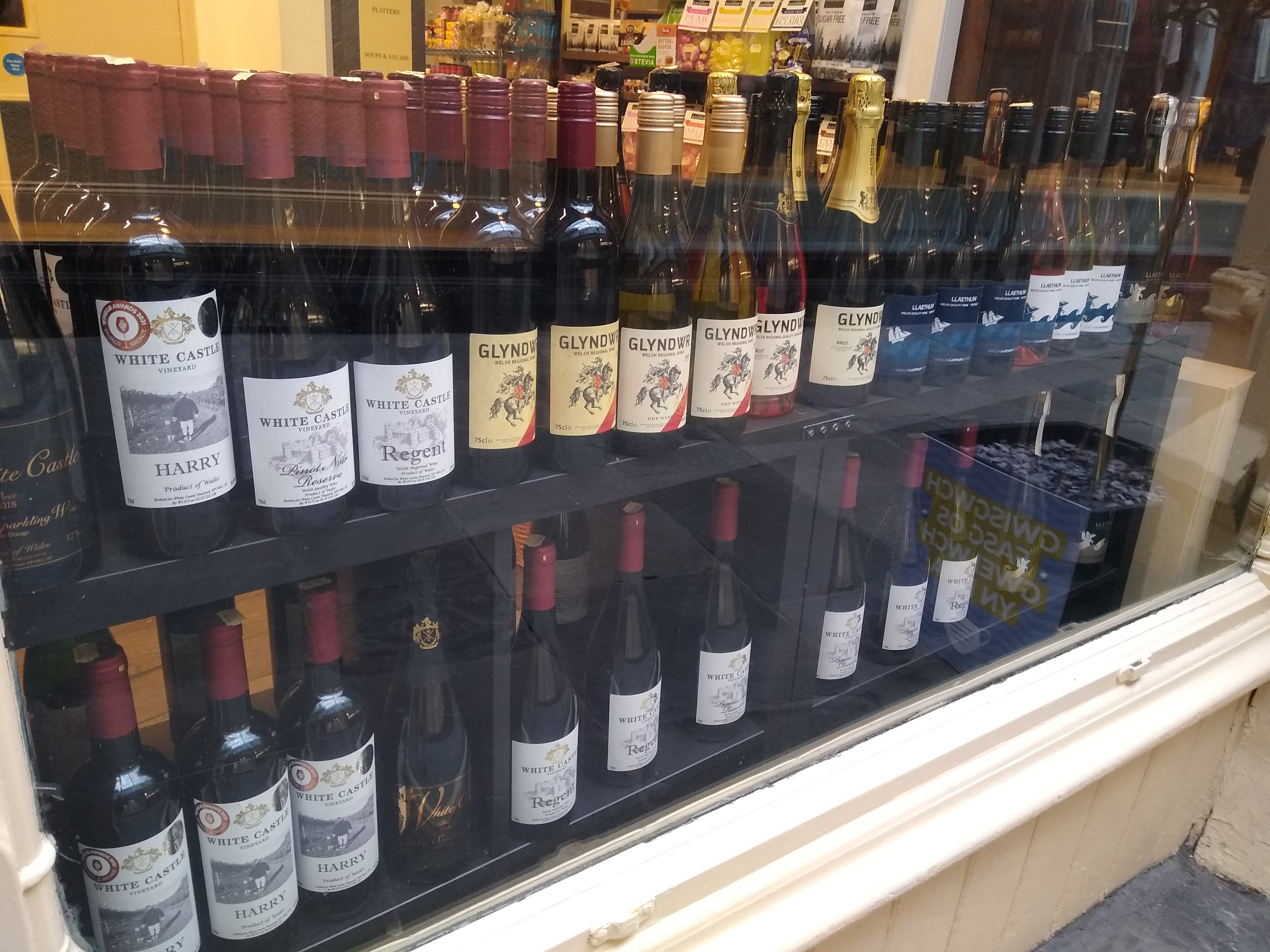
Welsh wine for sale in Cardiff

Welsh vineyards were first planted by Romans, and, in the 1970s, modern vineyards were planted in South Wales with the intention of creating Welsh wine. Despite a slow start, by 2005, Wales had 20 vineyards, producing 100,000 bottles a year, primarily white wines, but also a few reds. According to the Wine Standards Board, by September 2015, there were 22 operational vineyards in Wales. By 2024, this number had increased to 48.

- Welsh wine is registered as a Protected Designation of Origin (PDO) in the EU and the UK. It is to wine produced in Wales from grapes grown in the designated area, using prescribed methods. Products must use grapes from vines growing at a height of less than 220 m (720 ft) above sea level. The product may be vinified outside of the designated area provided it is contiguous to Wales and prior authorisation has been granted from the Food Standards Agency. The product must conform to restrictions regarding alcohol content, acidification and sweetening.
- Welsh regional wine is registered as a Protected Geographical Indication (PGI) in the EU and the UK. The designation is limited to wine produced with at least 85% of the grapes used being harvested in Wales; production has to be within Wales or a derogated area contiguous with the border with England. The product must conform to restrictions regarding alcohol content, acidification and sweetening.

=== Scottish wine ===
In 2015, Scotland's first home-grown wine was produced by Christopher Trotter, in Fife, at a vineyard he started in 2012. One merchant described it as sherry-like with "nutty" notes, and thought that it might complement a "very strong cheese". After four successive very difficult wet seasons, he abandoned and uprooted the vineyard in 2018.

In 2016, another attempt at creating a vineyard in Scotland was made by Dr Alan Smith, an honorary research fellow at the University of Durham's Earth Sciences department, who had moved to Aberdeenshire 15 years previously to start a permaculture project. The site used in Strathdon, Aberdeenshire is further north than Moscow and Russian and Ukrainian grape varieties such as Golubok were used and grown in trenches to protect them from north east Scotland's cold climate.

Fruit wine has been produced in Carse of Gowrie in Perthshire since 1987, an area known for fruit growing and where vines may have been growing during the Middle Ages. Since 2001, fruit wine has also been produced on the Orkney island of Lamb Holm.

=== British wine ===
The term British wine is used to describe a drink made in Britain by the fermentation of grape (or any other fruit) juice or concentrate originating from anywhere in the world. It cannot be used for wine in the legal sense, which must be produced from freshly pressed grapes. The most common style is a medium or sweet high-strength wine that is similar to sherry, and was formerly known as British Sherry.

== History ==
=== Roman era to 19th century ===
The Romans introduced winemaking to Britain, in a period with a relatively warm climate. Their vineyards were as far north as modern day Northamptonshire and Lincolnshire, with others in Buckinghamshire and Cambridgeshire, and probably many other sites. The wines were most likely fruity and sweet, fermented with added honey, and drunk within six months. Winemaking continued at least down to the time of the Normans, with over 40 vineyards in England mentioned in the Domesday Book; much of it was communion wine for the Eucharist.

From the Middle Ages, the English market was the main customer of clarets from Bordeaux, France, helped by the "Angevin Empire" of the House of Plantagenet, which encompassed both England and large provinces in France including Guyenne and Gascony, where Bordeaux wine is grown. When Henry VIII was crowned in 1509, 139 vineyards were recorded, 11 of which produced wine for the royal household. In the early 16th century, wine was expensive for most commoners, therefore an Act from 1536 decreed that wine imported from France would have a price ceiling, with those imported from Greece and especially Spain with an even higher maximum selling price, most likely due to its better perceived quality.

In the 18th century, the Methuen Treaty of 1703 imposed high duties on French wine. This led to the English becoming a main consumer of sweet fortified wines like sherry, port wine, and Madeira wine from Spain and Portugal. Fortified wine became popular because unlike regular wine, it did not spoil after the long journey from Portugal to England.

Just as English wine began to recover from the epidemics of phylloxera and powdery mildew in the mid-19th century, brought back by the explorers of America, commercial English wine was dealt a heavy blow. In 1860, the government, under Lord Palmerston (Liberal), supported free trade and drastically cut the tax on imported wines from 1 shilling to twopence, a decrease of 83%. English wine was therefore outcompeted by superior foreign products that could be sold at a lower cost to the customer.

=== 20th century ===
The twilight of British winemaking tradition was brought to an end with the onset of the First World War, as the need for crops and food, and the rationing of sugar, took priority over wine production. For the first time in 2000 years, English wines were no longer being produced.

In 1936, George Ordish planted vines in Wessex and the South of England. With many individuals keen to produce their own wines from home, and with equipment and methods becoming available, the government outlawed the production of homemade alcohol at the beginning of the 1960s, only to retract the law after five years as the homebrew fashion escalated considerably.

Other small commercial vineyards in Britain followed in the 1960s with growers such as Joy and Trevor Bates in Kent, Norman Cowderoy in West Sussex, Nigel Godden in Somerset, Gillian Pearkes in Devon and Philip Tyson-Woodcock in East Sussex. Wales also had George Jones, Lewis Mathias and Margaret Gore-Browne.

Viticulture was revived in the 1970s onwards, possibly helped by a rising local temperature due to global warming, making many parts of Hampshire, Sussex, Kent, Essex, Suffolk, Berkshire, Nottinghamshire and Cambridgeshire dry and hot enough to grow grapes of high quality. The first English wines were influenced by the sweet German wines like Liebfraumilch and Hock that were popular in the 1970s, and were blended white and red sweet wines, called "cream wine" (creams). The largest vineyard in England was Denbies Wine Estate in Surrey, which has 265 acres (1.07 km^{2}) under vines.

From a peak of over 400 vineyards in the late 1980s, by 2000 one third of these had given up, but plantings have since accelerated, helped by the growing success of English sparkling wines. In 2004, a panel judging European sparkling wines awarded most of the top ten positions to English wines – the remaining positions going to French Champagnes. Similar results have encouraged an explosion of sparkling wine plantings. English still wines too have begun to pick up awards at big wine competitions, notably Decanter, and the IWSC.

Winemaking has spread from the South East and South West and also to the Midlands and North of England, with Yorkshire, Nottinghamshire, Shropshire, Derbyshire, Leicestershire and Lancashire boasting at least one vineyard each as of 2007.

=== 21st century ===
Significant plantings have been made across the south of the country, with a number of farmers contract growing vines for major English producers. Farmers are looking at the potential benefits of growing vines, as the return per tonne for grapes over more traditional crops is substantial. A field of wheat might yield 3 tonnes per acre at around £120 per tonne. Growing grapes could yield 3 to 4 tonnes per acre at around £950 to £1100 per tonne. One concern is that growers need to invest money for no initial return, as crops tend to come in the third or fourth year. Another concern is that grape production in the climate is highly variable: "In England, it is only in about 2 years in every 10 that grape production will be really good, 4 years will be average and 4 years poor or terrible – largely due to weather and/or disease exacerbated by weather." However, English vineyards share European weather patterns, so 2006 was a bumper year, 2007 saw ripe grapes but low volumes, 2008 was very poor, but both 2009 and 2010 were good years. 2011 was average, 2012 dreadful, and 2013 good. Total British cereal production is not so variable.

Another explanation for the growth in viticulture in the UK is the local food movement, and the desire by consumers to cut the amount of food miles connected with the produce that they buy, including locally produced wine.

English wine was given added prestige when Queen Camilla (then Duchess of Cornwall) became the new President of the United Kingdom Vineyards Association on 25 July 2011. In June 2012 there was also a boost for English wine during the celebration of the Diamond Jubilee of Queen Elizabeth II.

Since Brexit and law change, labelling of geographical origin is no more needed and it is possible to have wine with less than 8.5% of alcohol including wine without alcohol.

== Grape varieties ==
According to WineGB, over 1,300 hectares (3,200 acres) had been planted by 2009, and with further major plantings of sparkling wine varieties the total was likely to be in excess of 1,500 hectares (3,700 acres) by 2012. As of 2004, Seyval blanc was the most grown variety, with Reichensteiner next, with Müller-Thurgau and then Bacchus following closely behind. However, Müller-Thurgau, which was one of the first to be grown during the 20th century renaissance (see below), has recently lost favour, dropping from 134.64 hectares (332.7 acres) (1st) in 1996 to 88.1 hectares (218 acres) (3rd) in 2004. Other widely grown varieties of white grape include Chardonnay, Madeleine Angevine, Schönburger, Huxelrebe and Ortega. Red varieties include Dornfelder, Pinot Meunier and Pinot noir, and a few others, but red grapes tend to be grown less often, with 20,184 hectolitres (444,000 imp gal; 533,200 US gal) of white wine and only 5,083 hectolitres (111,800 imp gal; 134,300 US gal) of red wine made in 2006.

== Consumption ==
Wine imported into the United Kingdom (thousands of imperial gallons); 1800 - 1910 :148
Year	Total wine imported
1800	7,472
1810	10,819
1820	5,170
1830	6,880
1840	9,311
1850	9,304
1860	12,475
1870	17,775
1880	17,385
1890	16,194
1900	16,804
1910	13,735

Wine consumed in the United Kingdom (millions of gallons); 1920 - 1938:148
Year	Total wine consumed
1920	15.0
1931	16.4
1938	21.6

Consumption of wine in the United Kingdom; 1960 - 95:154
Year	Consumption
1960	3.6
1964	5
1968	6.5
1971	7
1972	7.9
1973	9.3
1975	11.3
1980	17.9
1982	19.1
1985	23.5
1987	25.9
1990	27.5
1993	30.2
1995	32.1

== Effect on the British economy ==
Most of the wine consumed in Britain is imported from other countries, though consumption of English wine is increasing. Production doubled from 1.34 million bottles to 3.17 million from 2008 to 2009, and in 2010 4 million bottles of English wine were produced. While UK wine production hit a record 21.6 million bottles in 2023, the 2024 harvest yielded approximately 10.7 million bottles due to more challenging weather conditions.

British annual production of wine (1990–2022), in thousands of hectolitres.
Sources: Wine GB statistics.

== Rules of wine labelling ==
Protected Denomination of Origin (PDO) is the top category official category of wine in the UK. PGI (Protected Geographical Indication) is next and then varietal wine. PDO and PGI wines must have a full post bottling analysis and pass a tasting panel (or win an award at a recognised competition). These are established via the UK Vineyards Association (UKVA) and the UK Government's Department for Environment Food and Rural Affairs (DEFRA).

English sparkling wines are made from grapes grown close to the limit for viticulture. All vineyards are positioned at above 49.9 degrees north leading to long daylight hours in the growing season. The climate is temperate with few summer days above 30 °C. The diurnal temperature range is high.

These wines are made from the classic sparkling wine grape varieties. In England these varieties reach full phenolic ripeness at moderate sugar levels and with high acid levels. Wines from this PDO are made entirely from must containing only natural acid. These wines exhibit stronger aromatic flavours of the underlying grape varieties than wines from the same varieties grown at warmer latitudes.

The northerly latitude of the vineyards in this PDO creates the long growing season and long daylight hours that are key to the development of strong aromatic flavours. The moderate temperatures lead to the high acidity and low pH which is the backbone of fine sparkling wines.

English sparkling wines are made from the following vine varieties:

- Chardonnay
- Pinot noir
- Pinot Noir Précoce
- Pinot Meunier
- Pinot blanc
- Pinot gris
- Seyval blanc
- Reichensteiner

Where the conditions for the use of the terms "bottle-fermented", "traditional method" or "bottle fermented by the traditional method" have been met, the term "traditional" can be used on the label.

== See also ==
- Irish wine
- English sparkling wine
- Winemaking
- Agriculture in the United Kingdom
- English Wine Week

== Bibliography ==
- Freeman, Bobby (1996). First catch your peacock : her classic guide to Welsh food (Rev. paperback ed.). Talybont, Ceredigion: Y Lolfa. ISBN 0862433150.
- Skelton, Stephen (2014). Wine Growing in Great Britain, A complete guide to growing grapes for wine production in cool climates (First ed.). London: S. P. Skelton Ltd. ISBN 9780951470367.
