= Wissett =

Village in Suffolk, England

Coordinates: 52.361°N 1.473°E

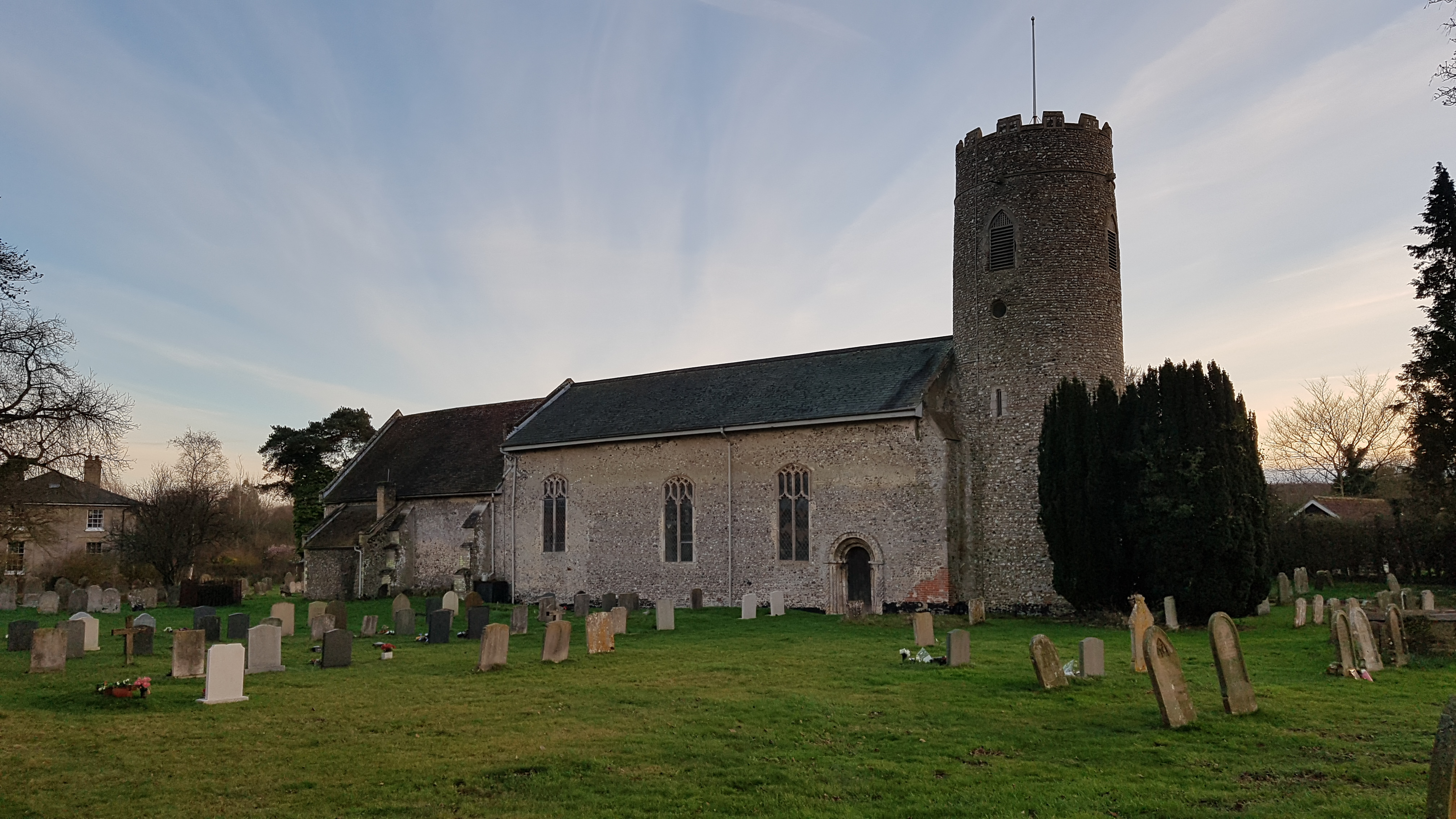
- Church of St Andrew

- Location within Suffolk
- Area: 8 km^{2} (3.1 sq mi)
- Population: 268 (2011)
  - Density: 34/km^{2} (88/sq mi)
- OS grid reference: TM366794
- District: East Suffolk
- Shire county: Suffolk
- Region: East
- Country: England
- Sovereign state: United Kingdom
- Post town: Halesworth
- Postcode district: IP19
- Dialling code: 01986
- UK Parliament: Waveney

Wissett is a village and civil parish in the English county of Suffolk. It is 2 miles (3.2 km) north-west of the market town of Halesworth in the East Suffolk district. Historically, it was in the Blything Hundred.

At the 2011 United Kingdom census the parish had a population of 268. The village is spread along the Halesworth road with the Lowestoft to Ipswich railway cutting through the extreme eastern edge of the parish. The nearest railway station is Halesworth railway station. The parish borders the parishes of Rumburgh, St James South Elmham, Spexhall, Halesworth and Chediston.

== History ==
Wissett manor was held by Ralph the Staller, Baron of Gael in Brittany before the Norman Conquest. Ralph was created Earl of East Anglia in 1067, but his son lost the title and the manor passed to Count Alan of Brittany and Richmond in 1075. The Domesday Book of 1086 records that Wissett was then combined with Rumburgh; the site of Rumburgh Priory which had 12 Benedictine monks. It had four carucates of land and a population of 97 families. The village chapel was a cell of the priory.

The artists Vanessa Bell and Duncan Grant, and Grant's lover the writer David Garnett, lived in Wissett for the summer of 1916. Bell's sister, Virginia Woolf, wrote after visiting them that: "Wissett seems to lull asleep all ambition. Don't you think they have discovered the secret of life? I thought it wonderfully harmonious."

== Culture and community ==
The parish church is dedicated to Saint Andrew. It is one of around 40 round-tower churches in Suffolk (Note: The exact number of round-tower churches in the county is a matter of debate. Some sources list 38, others cite between 40 and 43. They almost all date from the late Anglo-Saxon or early Norman periods and were mostly built between the 11th and 14th-centuries. There are around 183 round-tower churches in England, most of them in Norfolk, which has around 124, and Suffolk. Four of the churches now in Norfolk were previously in Suffolk before boundary changes in 1974.) and dates from the 11th century. The tower has a floor partly dated to the 12th century, one of the oldest recorded church tower floors in the United Kingdom. The church was built as a chapel to Rumburgh Priory. Two doors and the tower arch are the remaining elements of Norman architecture. The church is a Grade I listed building.

The carved wooden statue of St Andrew was crafted from driftwood in 2006 by Peter Eugene Ball. The parish is now one of fourteen which together form the Blyth Valley Team Ministry in the Diocese of Saint Edmundsbury and Ipswich.

The village has a village hall and a public house, The Plough Inn, which also operates as a village shop. Wissett Hall is a red-brick manor house dating from the 17th century, whilst Manor Farmhouse dates from the 16th century and The Grange from the 14th; both are Grade II* listed buildings. The Old Chapel, a former dissenters' chapel, is now a private dwelling.

The parish council operates a regular newsletter, The Wissett Web. Valley Farm Vineyard was established in the parish in 1987 and has produced United Kingdom Vineyard Association Gold Medal-winning wine.

== Education ==
The Wissett School Board was formed in 1878, and the village school opened the following year, 1879. It operated as a board school until 1902, when it became a local authority primary school under the provisions of the Education Act 1902. The school continued to operate until 1961, when it closed due to the small size of its roll. Children now attend primary school in Halesworth and secondary school at Bungay High School.

== The Wissett Hoards ==
Early in 2011 two hoards of Bronze Age axe heads and spears, together with a single rapier blade, were discovered in Wissett by two metal detectorists. The hoards were found about nine metres apart. The second hoard was excavated fully by the County Archaeological Team, and expert examination of the objects has shown them to be over 3,000 years old, dating to the Middle Bronze Age.

It is considered unusual to find two hoards so close together. From the identical alloy used in both hoards, it has been suggested that they are contemporary with each other. Several of the items are of a type that have never previously been found together.

In all, fifteen objects were authenticated by the British Museum, and were valued at £4,300. They were purchased by the Halesworth and District Museum.
