= Hermann Müller (Swiss botanist) =

Swiss botanist (1850–1927)

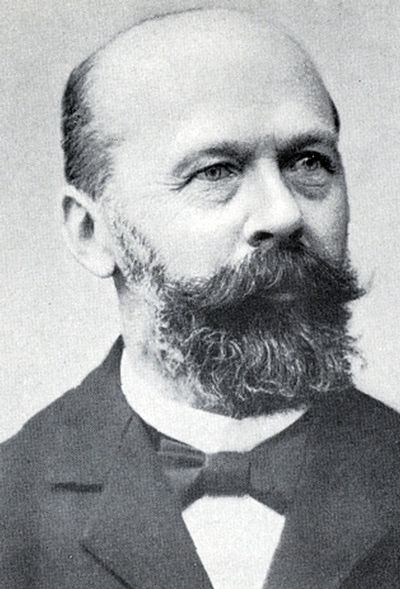
- Born: 21 October 1850; Tägerwilen, Canton Thurgau, Switzerland
- Died: 18 January 1927 (aged 76); Wädenswil, Canton of Zurich
- Education: Polytechnikum Zürich, University of Würzburg (PhD 1874)
- Known for: Creation of the grape variety Müller-Thurgau
- Scientific career
- Fields: Botany, plant physiology, oenology, grape breeding.
- Institutions: Prussian Institute for Horticulture and Viticulture; School for Horticulture and Viticulture, Wädenswil
- Doctoral advisor: Julius von Sachs
- Author abbrev. (botany): Müll.-Thurg.

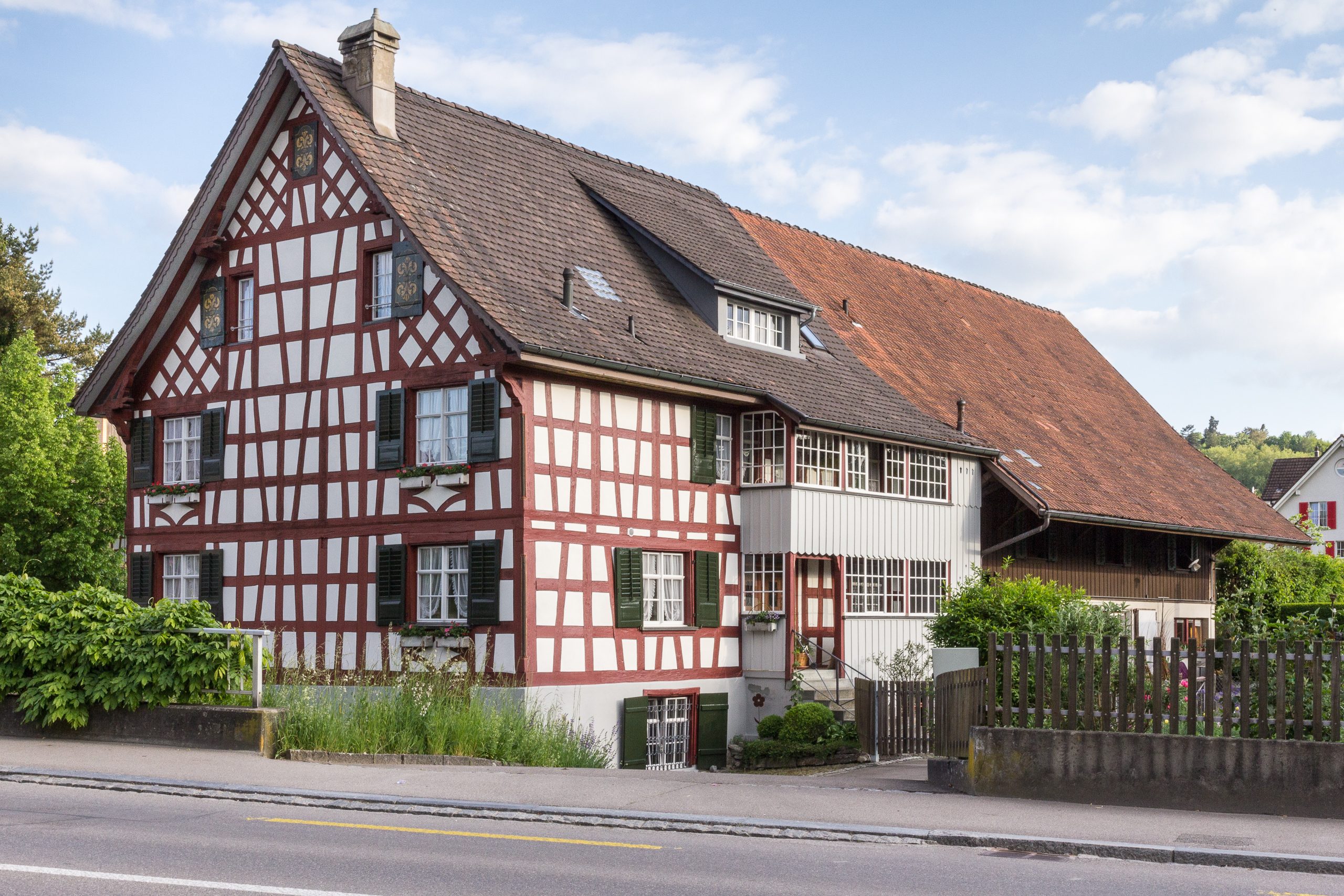
Hermann Müller birthplace in Tägerwilen

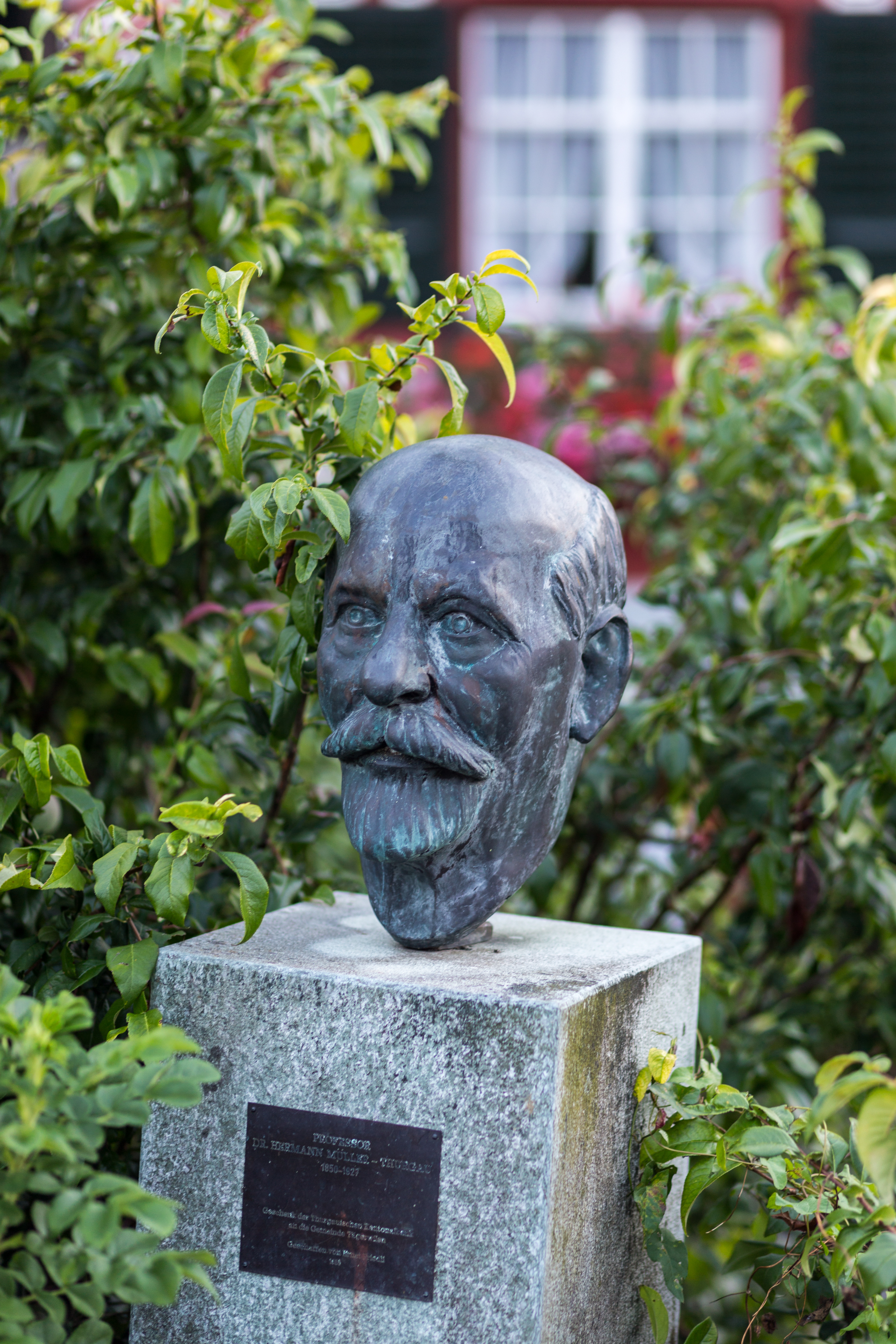
Bust in Tägerwilen

Hermann Müller (Swiss Standard German: [ˈhɛrman ˈmʏlər]; 21 October 1850 in Tägerwilen, Canton Thurgau – 18 January 1927 in Wädenswil) was a Swiss botanist, plant physiologist, oenologist and grape breeder. He called himself Müller-Thurgau, taking the name of his home canton.

== Biography ==
Hermann Müller was born to Konrad Müller, a master baker and vintner, and his wife Maria Egloff, the daughter of Karl Anton Egloff, a wine merchant of Oestrich, Hessen. He attended the Lehrerseminar Kreuzlingen (Kreuzlingen Teachers College) (1869–70). He taught in Stein am Rhein (1870–72) while studying at the Polytechnikum Zürich (1872 graduate). He then attended the University of Würzburg for graduate studies under Julius von Sachs, was awarded his PhD in 1874 and stayed some time as Sachs' assistant. During the years 1876–1890, he worked at the Prussian Institute for Horticulture and Viticulture (Königlich Preussische Lehranstalt für Obst- und Weinbau) in Geisenheim, Rheingau where he led its experimental station for plant physiology.

In 1891 he returned to Switzerland as director of the newly created Experimental Station and School for Horticulture and Viticulture (Versuchsstation und Schule für Obst-, Wein- und Gartenbau) in Wädenswil, where he stayed until his 1924 retirement. From 1902, he was also connected to Polytechnikum Zürich as professor of botany.

He worked on teams which investigated fertility of the vine, vine diseases, and malolactic fermentation in wine.

In 1890, he was made an honorary member of the German Viticultural Association and in 1920 he received an honorary doctorate from the University of Bern.

Müller researched and published on a wide range of topics in viticulture and winemaking, including the biology of vine flowering, assimilation of nutrients by the vine, vine diseases, alcoholic fermentation of wine, breeding of strains of yeast with specific properties, malolactic fermentation, development of wine faults, and methods for producing alcohol-free grape juice.

== Breeding of the Müller-Thurgau grape variety ==
During his time in Geisenheim, Müller created the grape variety Müller-Thurgau in a breeding programme initiated in 1882, by crossing Riesling with Madeleine Royale, although for a long time, it was erroneously assumed to be Riesling x Silvaner. Müller's goal was to combine the aromatic properties of Riesling with the earlier and more reliable ripening of Silvaner. Experimental plantations continued in Geisenheim until 1890, and in 1891 150 plants were shipped to Wädenswil where trials continued under Heinrich Schellenberg (1868–1967). The most successful clone of the trials (serial no. 58) was propagated in 1897 under the designation Riesling x Silvaner 1. Vines of this variety were distributed in Switzerland and abroad from 1908, and in 1913, 100 vines of this variety were taken to Germany by August Dern (1858–1930), who had worked with Müller in Geisenheim. Dern introduced the name "Müller-Thurgau" for the variety, while Müller himself continued to call it Riesling x Silvaner 1, although he did express doubts that this was the actual parentage of the new variety, and speculated that some misidentification of vine material could have occurred in the move from Geisenheim to Wädenswil.

Many experimental plantations of Müller-Thurgau in Germany were conducted from 1920, and its breakthrough from 1938 is credited to the grape breeder Georg Scheu in Alzey. By the 1950s it had become the most cultivated of any newly created grape varieties. It was the most planted grape variety of Germany from the late 1960s to the mid-1990s, and is still the second-most planted.
