= Madeleine Royale =

Variety of grape

- Grape (Vitis)
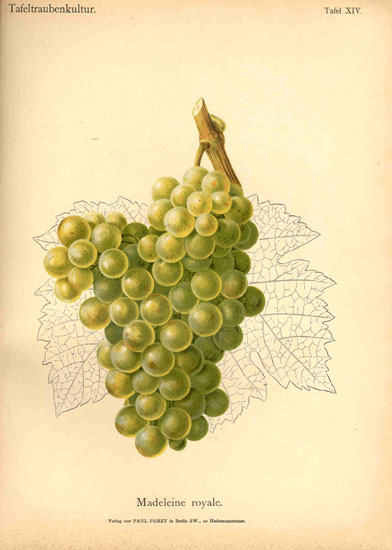
- Handbuch der Tafeltraubenkultur, Berlin, Paul Parey, 1894
- Species: Vitis vinifera
- Also called: Königliche Magdalenentraube (more)
- Origin: France
- Notable wines: Table/ornamental grape
- VIVC number: 7068

Madeleine Royale is a variety of white grape. It is mostly grown for table grapes or ornamental purposes, but is notable as a parent of Müller-Thurgau and Madeleine Angevine. It ripens extremely early, in some cases by the 22 July, the feast day of Mary Magdalene, hence the name.

== History ==
Madeleine Royale was selected in 1845 in the Loire nurseries of Moreau-Robert. It was believed to be a seedling of Chasselas (Gutedel), but DNA fingerprinting has shown that it is a cross of Pinot and Trollinger.

== Crosses ==
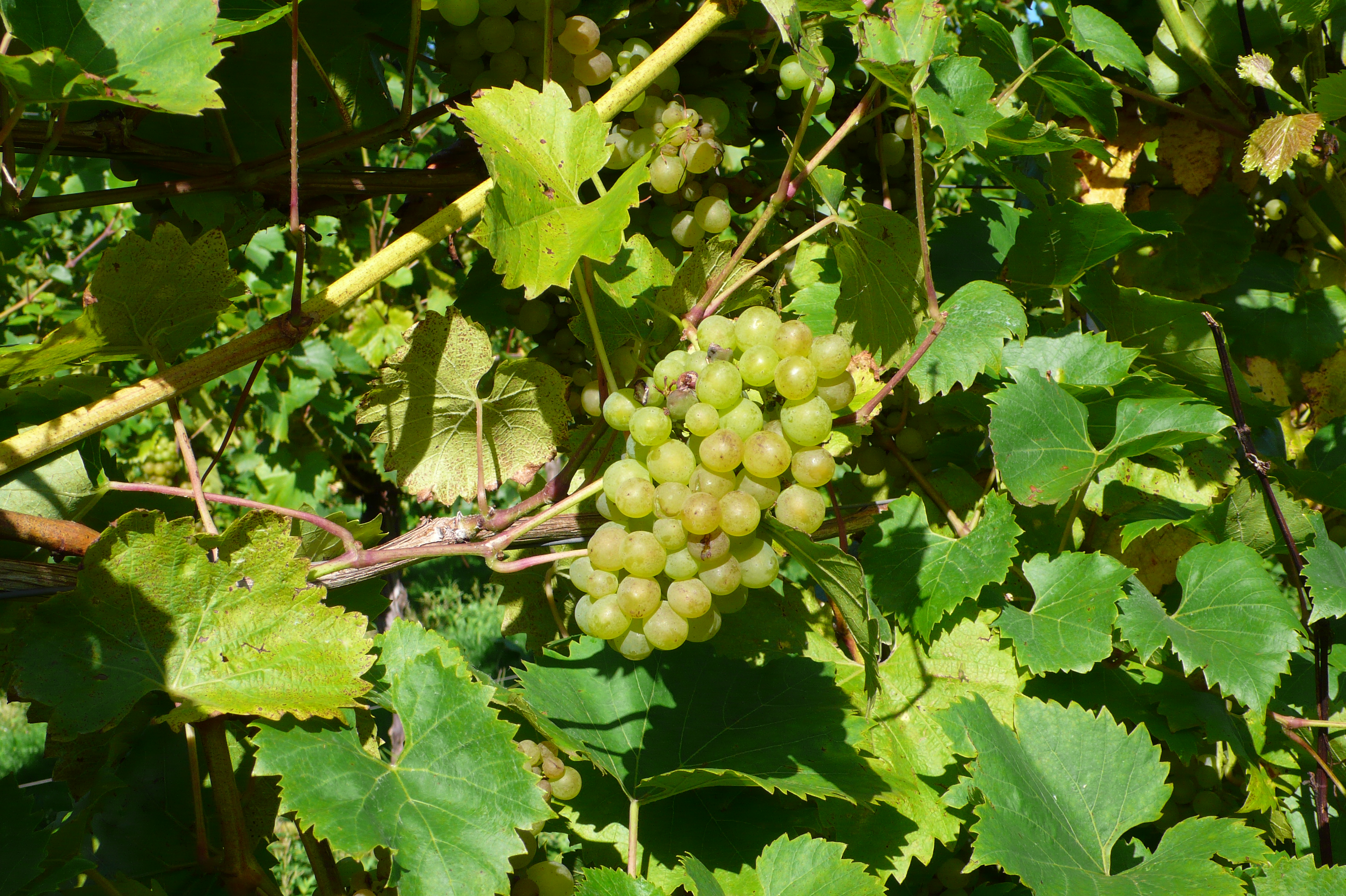
Madeleine Angevine, one of the crossed produced from Madeleine Royale.

Recent DNA evidence has shown that Madeleine Royale pollinated Riesling to produce Müller-Thurgau, one of the most widely planted grapes in Germany.

Madeleine Angevine was another Moreau-Robert creation in 1857. It is a cross between Précoce de Malingre and Madeleine Royale.

Prachttraube is a French cross between Boskokisi and Madeleine Royale.

Aside from the above, The VIVC give Madeleine Royale as the pollinator of the following crosses:

Airosa, Buleria, Canaleja, Claire Kuehlmann, Dalmasso 10-4, Dalmasso 10-10, Fruehgipfler, Geisenheim 248, Geisenheim 249, Geisenheim 250, Geisenheim 251, Girolamo Molon, Institut, Kuhlmann 473-3, Kuhlmann 474-3, Madeleine Salomon, Markant, Oberlin 571, Oberlin 572, Oberlin 573, Prachttraube, Seibel 735, Seibel 736, Sirio,

And the female parent of :

Balsa, Bienteveo, Oberlin 651, Oberlin 652, Oberlin 661, Oberlin 663, Oberlin 674, Oberlin 675, Oberlin 806, Oberlin 812, Pirovano 305, Pirovano 306, Pirovano 307, Pirovano 308, Pirovano 312, Pirovano 313 A, Pirovano 315, Primiera, Primus, Sacramento and Victor

== Distribution and wines ==
A little is grown in Austria, Belgium, England and Romania.

== Vine and viticulture ==
The bunches are conical, winged and compact. The grapes have a slight muscat taste. The extremely early ripening means that Madeleine Royale and its offspring are well suited to vineyards at high latitudes and altitudes. The extremely thin skins cause two problems - it is vulnerable to fungal diseases, and to damage in transit.

== Synonyms ==
Königliche Magdalenentraube, Maddaleina Royal, Maddalena Reale, Madeleine Imperiale, Madlen Blond, Madlen Korolevskaia, Madlen Roial, Madlen Roiyal, Madlen Royal, Madlenka Kralovska, Magdalena Kralovska, Magdalena Real, Magdalenka Kralovska, Magdalenka Kralyurska, Plant Du Caporal

== See also ==
- Madeleine Angevine
