= English Wine Week =

- Status: Active
- Genre: English Wine
- Date: 21st - 29th June
- Frequency: Annually
- Country: England
- Inaugurated: June 21, 2006
- Major events: Guided vineyard tours; Wine tastings and food pairings; Meet-the-winemaker sessions; Live music and picnics among the vines; Exclusive discounts on bottles and cases
- Organiser: Wines of Great Britain (WinesGB)
- Website: English Wine Week

English Wine Week is an annual wine event that celebrates English wine.

== History ==
English Wine Week was first establish in 2006 by Wines of Britain (WinesGB)

As of 2025 English whisky week has active for 19 years.

== Participants ==
Organised by various vineyards, wine producers, and related establishments, the event features a diverse range of activities, including wine tastings, festivals, and culinary experiences, showcasing the quality and diversity of English wines. Below is a summary of notable events:

=== Three Choirs Vineyards ===
==== Wine Tasting ====
On 19–20 June 2024, Three Choirs Vineyards, one of England's oldest and largest vineyards, hosted a wine tasting event, allowing visitors to sample a selection of their award-winning wines produced in Gloucestershire.

=== Gusbourne Vineyard ===
==== Al Fresco Picnic ====
Held on 15 or 16 June 2024, Gusbourne Vineyard in Kent offered an al fresco picnic experience, combining their sparkling and still wines with locally sourced food in a scenic vineyard setting.

==== Barbecue ====
On 21 June 2024, Gusbourne hosted a barbecue event, featuring their wines paired with grilled dishes.

==== Gusbourne Icons Experience ====
On 22 June 2024, the vineyard presented a curated tasting experience focusing on their flagship wines, highlighting their expertise in producing premium English sparkling wines.

=== Water Lane, Hawkhurst ===
==== English Wine Fair ====
On 15 June 2024, Water Lane in Hawkhurst, Kent, organised an English Wine Fair, showcasing a variety of wines from local and regional producers, offering visitors the opportunity to explore and purchase English wines.

=== Vineyards of Hampshire ===
==== Fizz Fest ====
On 23 June 2024, the Vineyards of Hampshire collective hosted Fizz Fest, a festival celebrating English sparkling wines. The event featured tastings, vineyard tours, and educational sessions about Hampshire’s growing reputation as a sparkling wine region.

=== Leeds Castle ===
==== Castle View Restaurant Wine Showcase ====
On 9 June 2024, the Castle View Restaurant at Leeds Castle, Kent, offered a by-the-glass selection of English wines as part of English Wine Week. Featured wines included those from Chapel Down, Wildshark, and Domaine Evremond, highlighting the diversity of Kentish wine production.

=== Tinwood Estate ===
==== Chocolate and Wine Tasting ====
On 18 June 2024, Tinwood Estate in West Sussex hosted a chocolate and wine tasting event, pairing their sparkling wines with artisanal chocolates.

=== Farm Shop Mayfair ===
==== Wine Tasting ====
On 19 June 2024, Farm Shop Mayfair in London held a wine tasting event featuring a selection of English wines.

== See also ==
- Sussex wine
- Food and drink industry in England
- Economy of England
