= Nyetimber =

Vineyard in West Sussex, England

Nyetimber is an English sparkling wine producer with 11 vineyards across 425 hectares in West Sussex, Kent and Hampshire. Nyetimber was the first producer in England to grow pinot noir, chardonnay and pinot meunier exclusively for sparkling wine. Each bottle undergoes a second fermentation in the bottle, is aged for extended periods, and made using the traditional method with only grapes from its own vineyards.

In 2025 Nyetimber won Champion Sparkling Wine and Sparkling Winemaker of the Year at the International Wine Challenge.

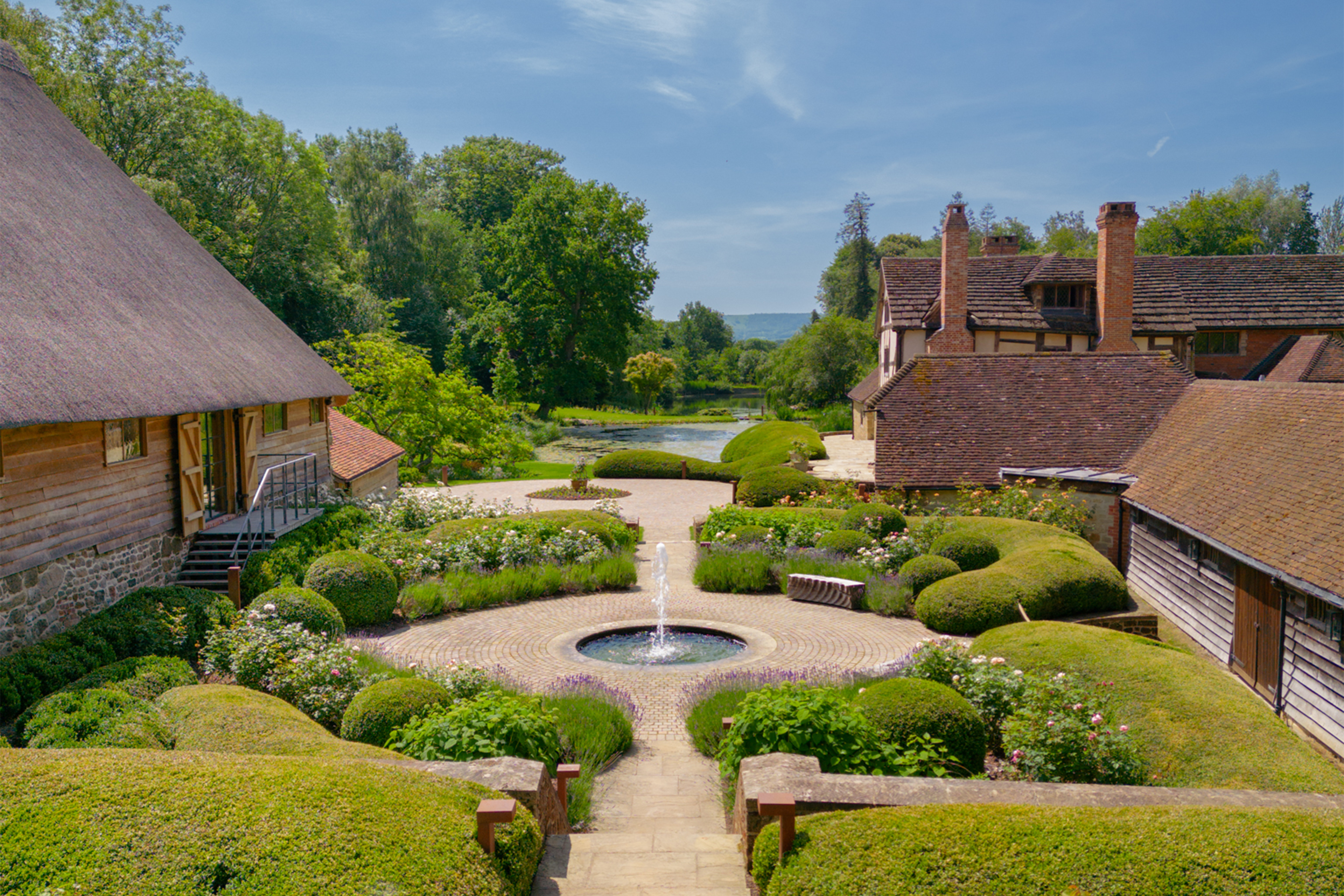
Nyetimber Manor

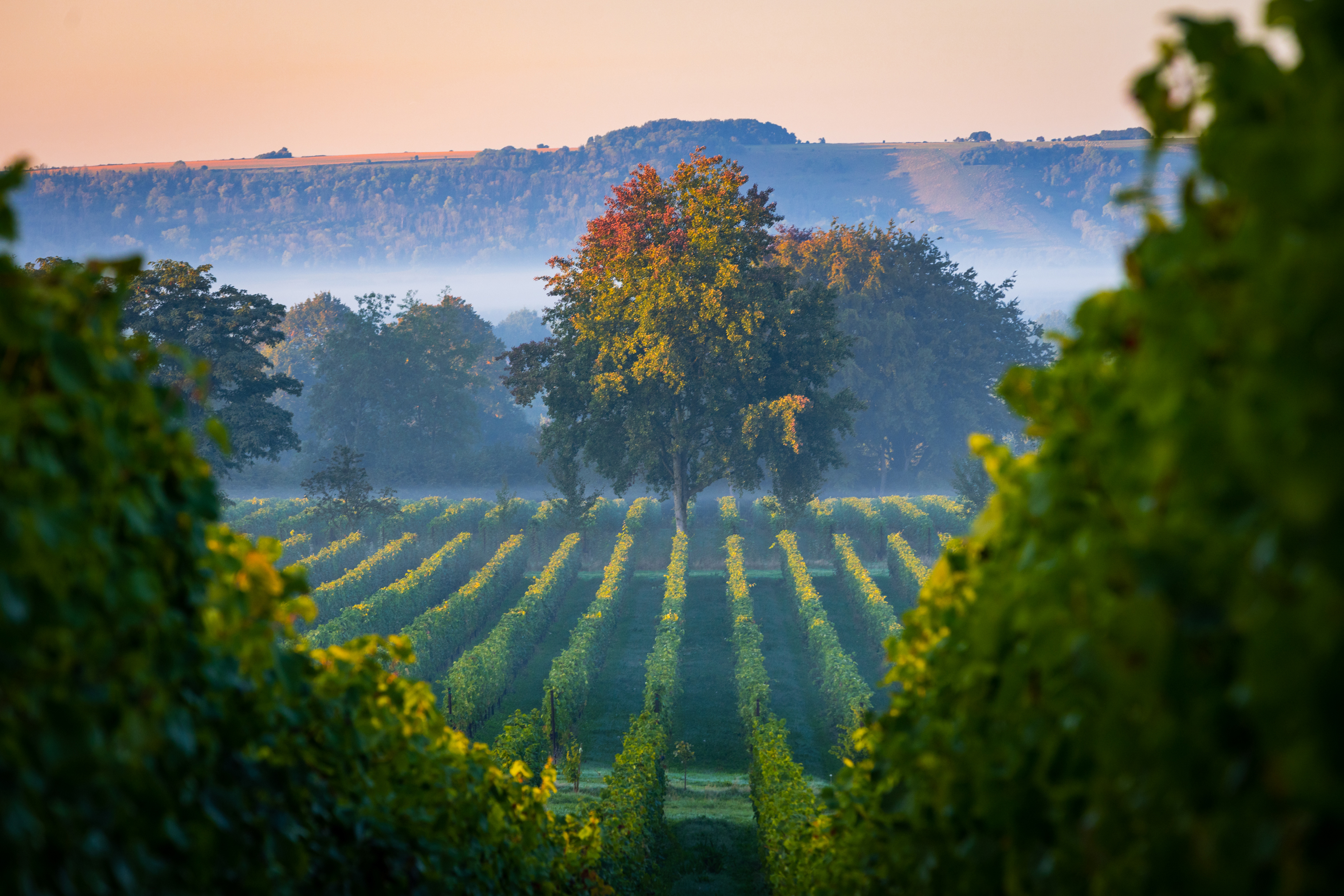
Nyetimber Manor Vineyard

Nyetimber Blanc de Blancs 2016 Magnum became the first sparkling wine produced outside of Champagne to win the Champion Sparkling Wine Trophy at the International Wine Challenge in the 34 years of the competition. Nyetimber's Head Winemaker, Cherie Spriggs, won Sparkling Winemaker of the Year for the second time. Her first win in 2018 made her the first winner from outside of champagne, and she remains the only female recipient of the award.

On April 03 2024 Nyetimber acquired The Lakes Distillery for £71 million pounds, the deal was finalised in June.

History

The Nyetimber estate was first recorded as “Nitimbreha” in the Domesday Book, which is believed to refer to a newly timbered house or a small timber plantation and was once home to Thomas Cromwell and later Anne of Cleves. Its English sparkling wine story began when the first vines were planted in 1988.

Nyetimber was acquired by an American couple, Stuart and Sandy Moss, in 1986. In 1988, they planted the first vines on the estate, becoming the first producer in England to plant pinot noir, chardonnay and pinot meunier exclusively for sparkling wine. The first vintage for Nyetimber was Blanc de Blancs 1992, which was released in 1996. The vintage went on to win gold at the International Wine and Spirit Competition and the Best English Wine trophy.

The most significant step forward for Nyetimber was in 2006 when the vineyard was taken over by the current owner and CEO, Eric Heerema, a Dutch businessman and wine enthusiast who bought the estate for £7.4 million. He believed the soil and south-facing slopes have the potential to create great wine.

In 2007, winemakers and married couple Cherie Spriggs and Brad Greatrix contacted Eric Heerema after discovering Nyetimber in Canada and recognising a shared passion for English sparkling wine. Cherie is now Head Winemaker at Nyetimber and has helped secure international awards and global recognition for its wines.

Vineyards and Estate

The Nyetimber Estate is based in West Sussex with 11 vineyards throughout West Sussex, Hampshire and Kent. The south-facing sites are sheltered from the coastal weather and benefit from England’s mild climate, allowing grapes to ripen gradually. The vines are planted in chalk and greensand soils that are renowned in the world of sparkling wine.
