= Madeleine Angevine =

Variety of grape

- Grape (Vitis)
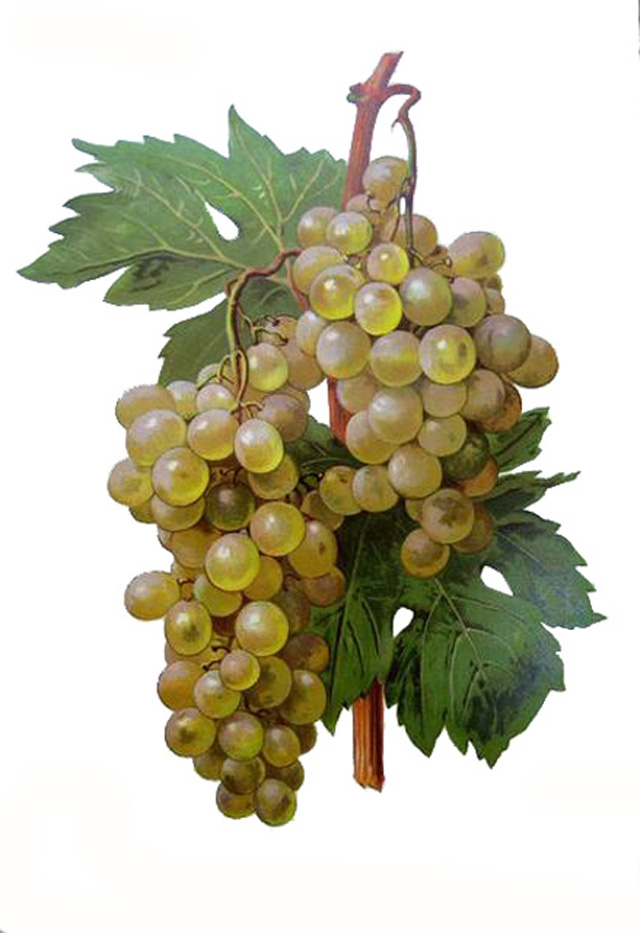
- Madeleine Angevine in Viala & Vermorel
- Color of berry skin: Blanc
- Species: Vitis vinifera
- Also called: see list of synonyms
- Origin: France
- Original pedigree: Malingre Précoce × Madeleine Royale
- Breeder: Moreau-Robert
- Year of crossing: 1857
- VIVC number: 7062

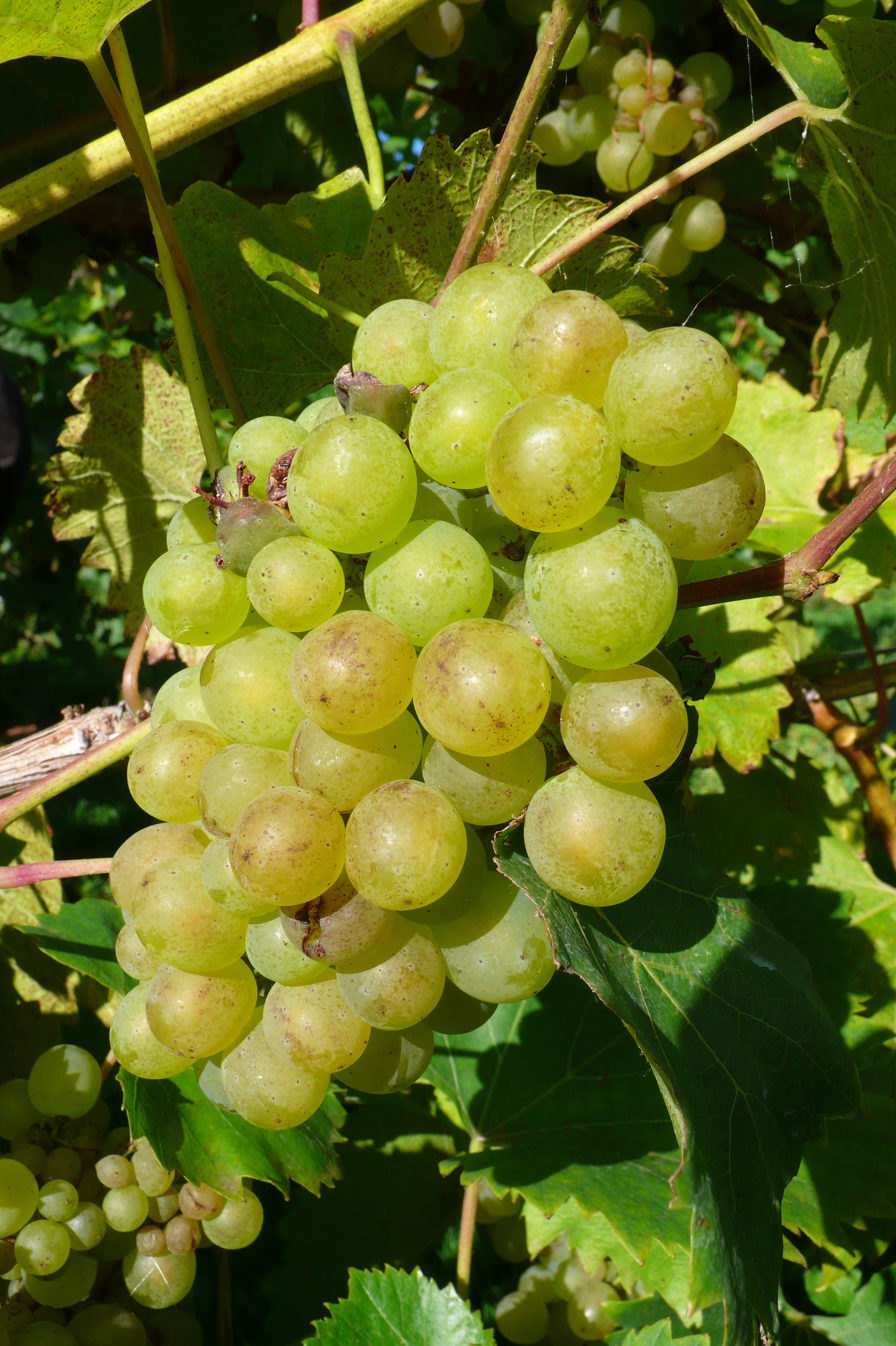
Madeleine Angevine grapes in England

Madeleine Angevine is a white wine grape from the Loire Valley in France that is also popular in Germany, Kyrgyzstan and Washington state. As of 2026, the grape has also been used widely in viticulture in the United Kingdom (including Scotland) and Ireland. The early-ripening grape is a cross between Madeleine Royale and Malingre Précoce grapes that grows well in cooler climates. Madeleine Angevine makes an attractive fruity wine with a flowery nose, similar to an Alsatian Pinot blanc. It is crisp, acid and dry and pairs particularly well with seafoods such as crab and oyster.

Madeleine Angevine was crossed with Silvaner Geilweilerhof to make the Noblessa and Forta grapes. It was crossed with Traminer to make the Comtessa grape.

In Washington State, the grape has developed a cult following in the Puget Sound region for its floral character and easy-drinking nature.

== Madeleine x Angevine 7672 / Sämling 7672 ==
The variety of grape called 'Madeleine Angevine' in the UK is a cultivar officially named Madeleine x Angevine 7672, originating from a crossing of unclear origin called Sämling 7672. It is distinct from the Madeleine Angevine grape traditionally grown in France.

== Synonyms ==
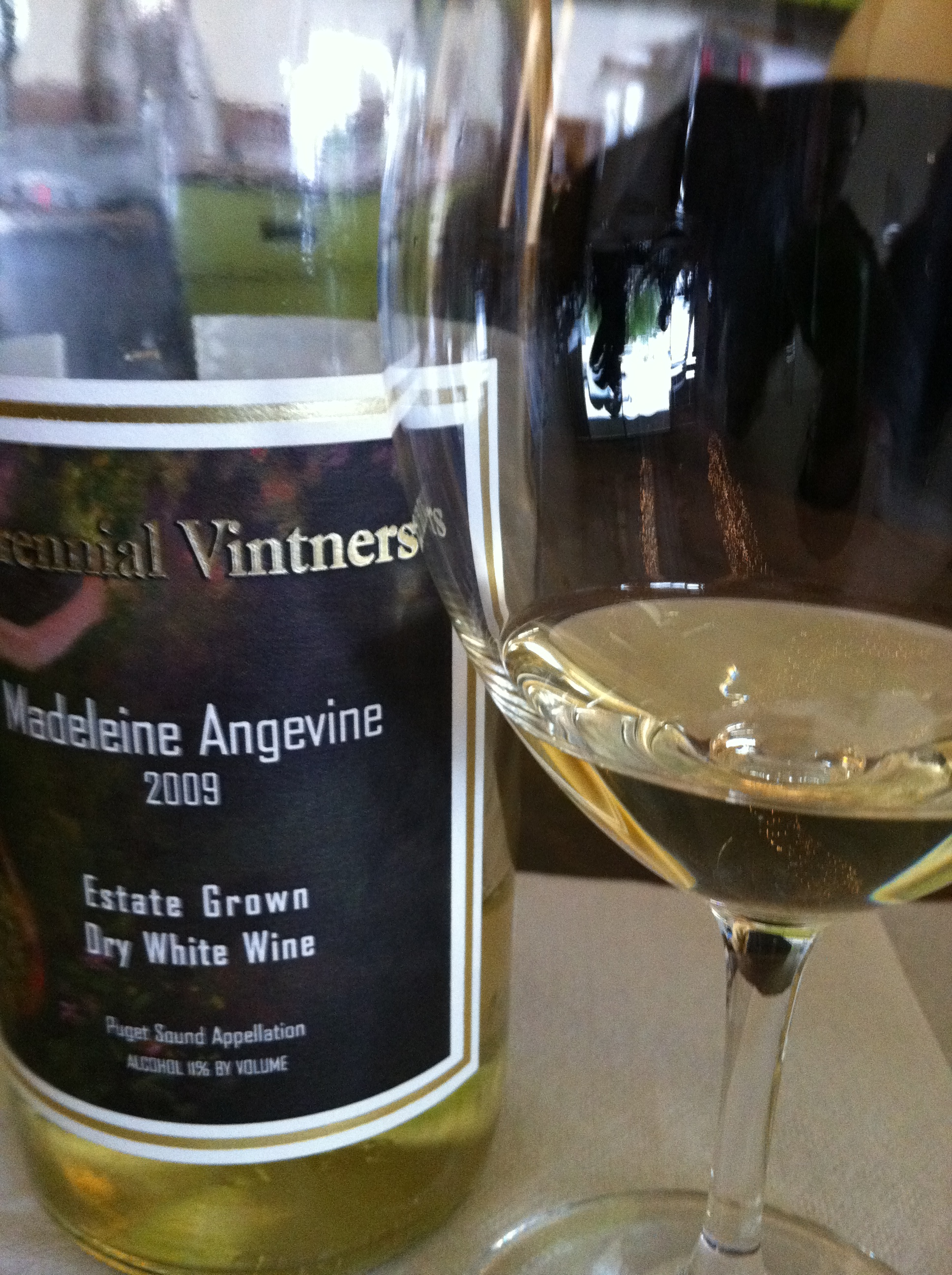
A wine made from Madeleine Angevine in Washington State

Madeleine Angevine is also known under the synonyms Azhupskaja Mladenka, Chasselas de Talhouet, Juliusi Magdolna, Korai Magda, Mad Angie, Maddalena Angevina, Madelaine Angevine, Madlen Angevine, Madlen Anzevin, Madlen Anzhevin, Madlen Anzhuiskaya, Madlenka Rana, Magdalene Angevine, Magdalenka Skora, Magdalina Anzhuiskaya, Margitszoeloe, Petrovskii, and Republician.
