= Malingre Précoce =

Variety of grape

- Grape (Vitis)
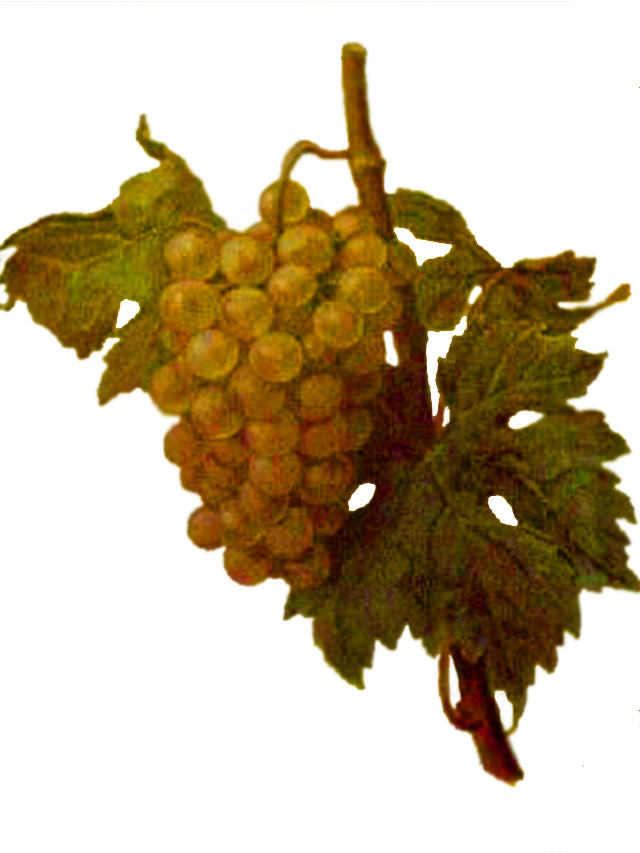
- Malingre Précoce in Viala & Vermorel
- Color of berry skin: Blanc
- Species: Vitis vinifera
- Also called: Früher Malingre, Malingre de Précoce and other synonyms
- Origin: France
- VIVC number: 7249

Malingre Précoce is a white variety of grape of French origin used primarily as table grape and to some extent for wine. It was first cultivated by a French gardener named Malingre in the vicinity of Paris around 1840, who created it from seedlings of unknown origin. The term "précoce" indicates early ripening, and because of this property Malingre Précoce finds some use in cold climate viticulture. Malingre Précoce has been used as a crossing partner for many other grape varieties, including Madeleine Angevine and Zarya Severa.

== Synonyms ==
Malingre Précoce is also known under the following synonyms: Blanc Précoce de Malingre, Chasselas de Tramontaner, Dr. Schmidtmanns, Early Malingre, Früher Gelber Malingre, Früher Malingre, Frühreifender Malingre, Hodvabne, Hodvapne, Korai Malingre, Madeleine Blanche de Malingre, Malengr Precos, Malengr Prekos, Malengr Ranii, Malinger Früher Gelber, Malinger Skory, Malingre, Malingre Koraija, Malingre Precose, Malingrovo Rane, Malingrovo Skore, Malmgra Pracosa, Précoce Blanc, Précoce de Malingre, Precos Blan, Precose de Malingre, Preko, Prekos de Malengr.
