= English sparkling wine =

Sparkling wine produced in England

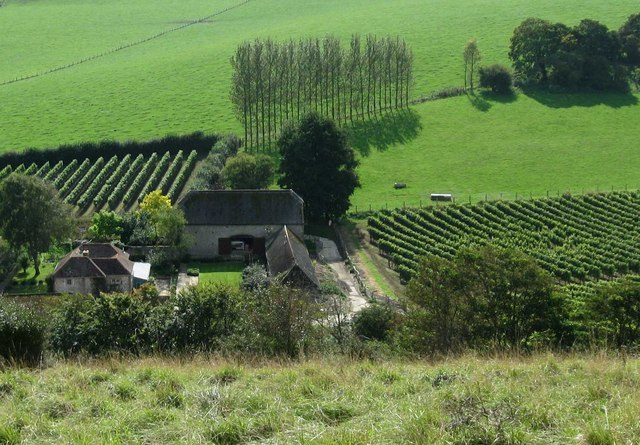
Breaky Bottom Vineyard near Lewes, a producer of English sparkling wine

English sparkling wine is sparkling wine from England, typically produced to the traditional method and mostly using the same varieties of grapes as used in Champagne – Chardonnay, Pinot noir and Pinot Meunier. English sparkling wine producers often employ Champagne terminology to describe the styles of their wine, such as "Classic Cuvée", "Blanc de Blancs" or "Demi-Sec".

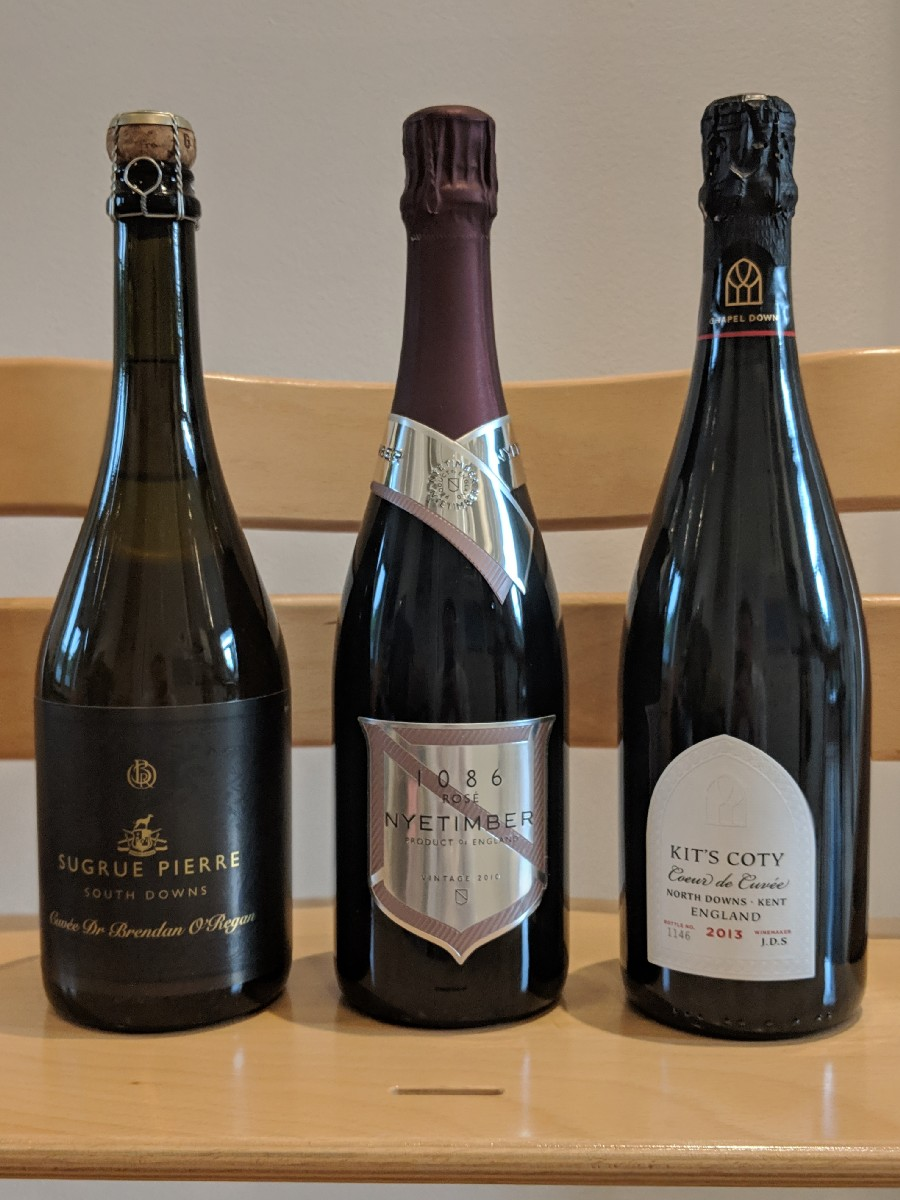
Prestige cuvées from three English sparkling wine producers: Sugrue South Downs, Nyetimber and Chapel Down

The terms "English" and "English Regional" as applied to sparkling wine are protected terms under the respective PDO and PGI classifications, although not all producers of sparkling wine in England choose to participate in these schemes. The PDO permits six varietals for English sparkling wine (Chardonnay, Pinot Noir, Pinot Meunier, Pinot Noir Précoce, Pinot Blanc and Pinot Gris) whereas the PGI is much more flexible, with around 90 permitted varietals.

The majority of wine produced in England is now sparkling: in 2023 sparkling wine accounted for 76% of wine produced in England and Wales, or 6.2 million bottles, and the three Champagne varieties account for 68% of grape varieties planted. There are over 100 wineries in England producing sparkling wines with Nyetimber, Ridgeview, Gusbourne, Chapel Down and Bolney Wine Estate being some of the largest producers.

== History ==
Early contributions to sparkling wine production in England include scientist Christopher Merret who presented a paper on the subject of secondary fermentation in the bottle at the Royal Society in 1662. Also of note in the 17th century was the development of strengthened wine bottles by Kenelm Digby, which enabled the pressures exerted by bottle fermentation to be withstood.

However, England did not develop any significant commercial production of sparkling wines until the late 20th century. From the 1950s a revival in English viticulture began, with the focus mainly on still wines from German grape varieties such as Müller-Thurgau and Reichensteiner.

In 1984 Carr Taylor were the first commercial vineyard in England to produce traditional method sparkling wines, however using Reichensteiner and Schönburger, not the classic Champagne varieties.

In 1988 Stuart and Sandy Moss planted a vineyard at Nyetimber, near Pulborough in West Sussex, consisting of the three Champagne grape varieties, with the intention of producing traditional method sparkling wine. The first wine from Nyetimber was released in 1997, and won an IWSC Gold Medal.

In the 1990s more English sparkling wine producers were established, such as Ridgeview, as well as existing still wine producers in England branching out into sparkling production, such as Chapel Down. The profile of English sparkling wines were raised during this period by a combination of awards from competitions like the IWSC as well as being served at events such as the Queen's golden wedding anniversary and banquets for the visits of the Emperor of Japan and the President of China.

In 2017, the French Champagne house Taittinger planted its first vines near a village in Kent, for a new venture into English sparkling wine. The first bottle will be ready in 2023.

== Regions ==
=== South East ===
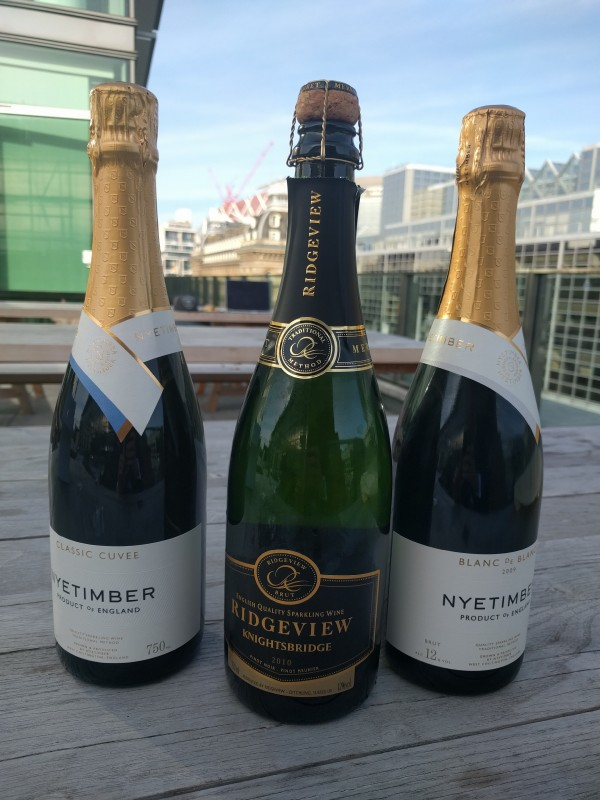
Bottles of Ridgeview and Nyetimber, English sparkling wines produced in Sussex

The majority of sparkling wine production in England is in the South East, with over 75% of the area under vine in this region. The top five counties in terms of area under vine in England (Kent, West Sussex, Hampshire, East Sussex and Surrey) all fall within this area.

==== Sussex ====
Sussex (covering the counties of East and West Sussex) has its own PDO for both still and sparkling wine, the first region within England to have a distinct classification scheme. This differs slightly from the requirements for the English sparkling wine PDO, for example permitting two additional varietals (Arbanne and Petit Meslier) to be used. In addition to the presence of some of the largest and most well known English sparkling wine producers like Nyetimber and Ridgeview, the prominence of Sussex as a wine-producing region is further emphasised for being the location of Plumpton College, which specializes in viticulture and winemaking courses.

==== Kent ====
Kent has the largest area under vine of any county in England, with Chapel Down and Gusbourne Estate being its largest producers.

==== Hampshire ====
Hampshire is home to Hambledon, England's oldest commercial vineyard, dating back to the 1950s revival of English viticulture. Although they began producing still wines, today they produce solely sparkling wines. The vineyard was recently named the UK's best vineyard to visit on Magnet kitchen's Vindex.

==== Surrey ====
Surrey is home to Denbies—which up until 2018 was the UK's largest single vineyard—however this will likely soon be superseded by Chapel Down. Denbies produce primarily still wines, but some of their output is sparkling.

=== South West ===
The South West is the second largest region of England for wine production in terms of area under vine, with 11% of the Great Britain total (note that the WineGB definition for the South West region includes Herefordshire). Camel Valley and Knightor are the two largest producers in Cornwall, with the former notable as being the first English wine to receive a Royal warrant.

=== East Anglia ===
East Anglia contains 5% of Great Britain's vineyards by area, with Essex being the county with the 6th largest area of vineyards in Great Britain. New Hall is the largest and one of the oldest vineyards in the region, being established in 1969, and today produces a mix of still and sparkling wine.

== See also ==
- Sussex wine
- Winemaking
- Sparkling wine
- Wine from the United Kingdom
- English wine cask units
- Agriculture in England
- Wine and Spirit Trade Association
