= Sussex wine =

Wine region in the United Kingdom

Sussex
- Wine region
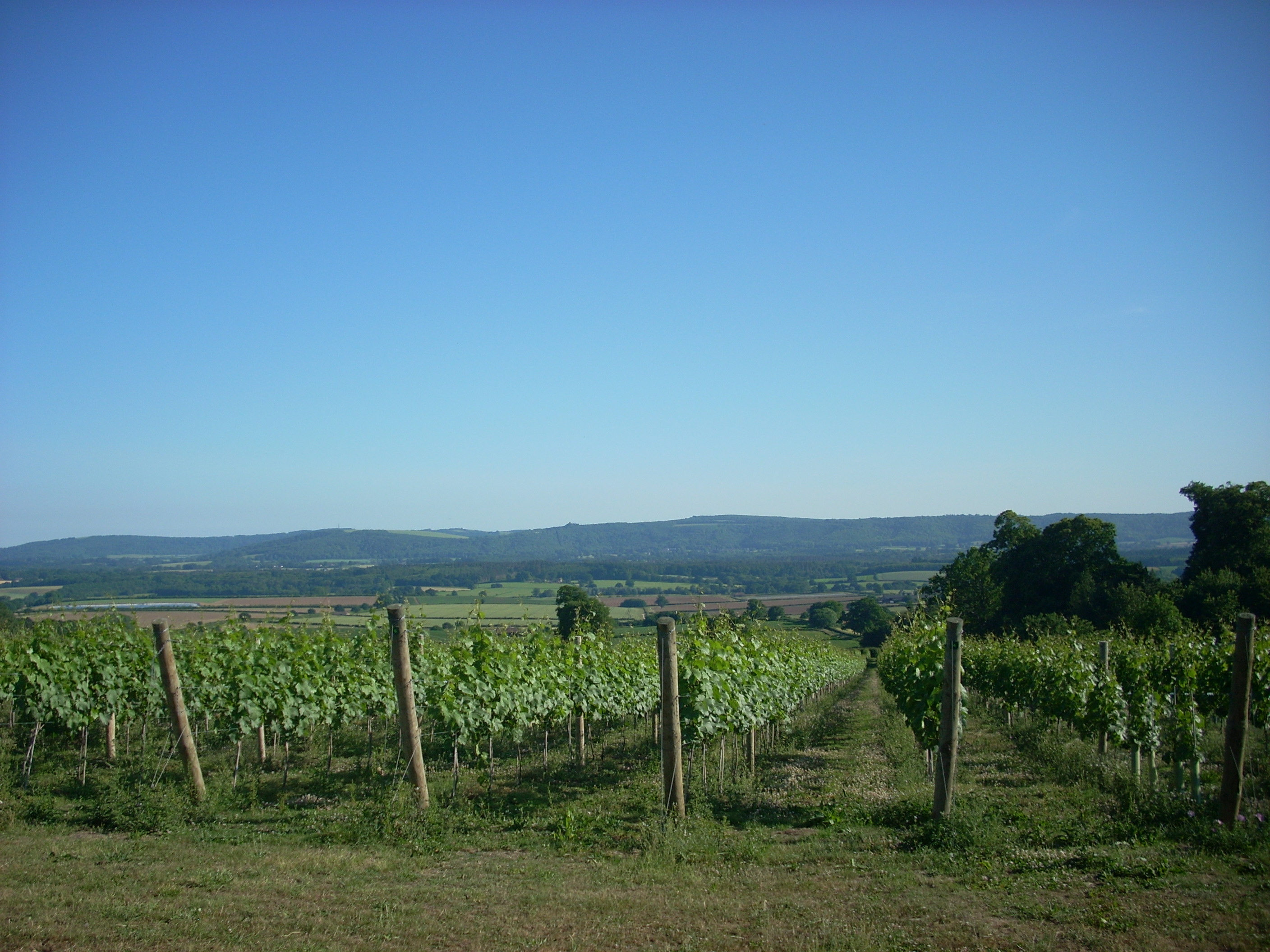
- Vineyard close to South Downs in Sussex
- Type: Protected Designation of Origin
- Year established: 2022
- Country: United Kingdom
- Soil conditions: Chalk, greensand and clay
- Size of planted vineyards: 888 hectares (2,190 acres)8
- No. of vineyards: 138
- Grapes produced: Pinot Meunier, Pinot Noir, Chardonnay, Bacchus, Pinot Blanc and Regent
- No. of wineries: 23

Sussex wine is wine produced in the historic county of Sussex in southern England, a region divided for administrative purposes into East Sussex and West Sussex (as well as the unitary authority of Brighton and Hove). In 2022, Sussex wine gained Protected Designation of Origin status in the European Union's Geographic Indication scheme. This followed the granting of protected regional status by the Department for Environment, Food and Rural Affairs (DEFRA) in 2016.

In 2023 wine made in Sussex accounted for 28% of the total wine produced in the United Kingdom; with 138 vineyards, Sussex produces more wine than any other county in the UK.

Sussex's sparkling wine in particular has drawn comparisons with Champagne and is sometimes rated as some of the best in the world.

== History ==
It is likely that wine has been produced in Sussex for around 2,000 years. It is likely that wine was produced either by the late Iron Age tribes such as the Belgae and Regni or by the Romans who governed what was to become Sussex.

It is likely vineyards in England produced significant amounts of wine in the 12th and early 13th centuries. However this came to an end in the 13th and 14th centuries as the Medieval Warm Period began to end and the Little Ice Age began. In the mid-14th century, the Black Death also reduced the workforce, and wine was thus increasingly imported from Gascony. By 1275 the vineyard at Battle Abbey had ceased grape production.

The Bolney wine estate was established at Bolney near Haywards Heath in 1972 by Janet and Rodney Pratt, and was one of the first commercial vineyards in England.

There are numerous other vineyards throughout the county on various soils ranging from chalky soils such as Rathfinny in Alfriston, to clay and silt over sandstone in the Rother Valley such as Oastbrook Estate in Bodiam.

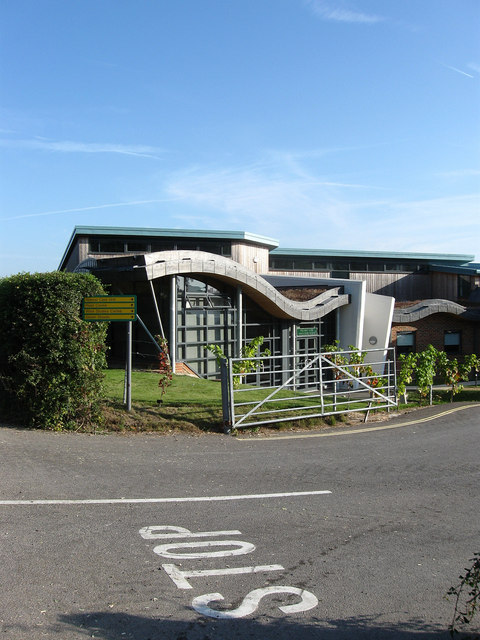
The Wine Science Centre at Plumpton College

Peter Hall planted his vineyard at Breaky Bottom on the South Downs near Lewes in 1974 at a time when there were only a dozen or so growers in the whole country.

Plumpton College is the UK's specialist centre for wine research and training. Its purpose-built wine centre opened in 2014. It is the only establishment in Europe to offer undergraduate degrees in Wine Business and Production taught in the English language.

== Geography and climate ==
The region has a warm climate and soil types similar to the Champagne district, which lies on the 49th parallel north, while the Sussex Weald lies on the 51st parallel north. One vineyard, Oastbrook, sits exactly on the parallel. Sussex has many south-facing slopes, which are suitable for growing the grape varieties found in sparkling wine, such as Chardonnay, Pinot Noir, and Pinot Meunier.

Climate change has also impacted the climate of Sussex. According to the Meteorological Office, 14 out of the 15 warmest summers on record have been in the 21st century. This means that what winemakers can grow in Sussex has changed. In addition, the cooler evenings and cool evening sea breezes in Sussex allow the grapes to develop high levels of natural acidity when fully ripe – crucial for sparkling wine and allowing harvesting to take place in October.

== Viticulture and grapes ==
Oastbrook Estate near Bodiam grows Pinot Meunier, Pinot Noir, Chardonnay, Pinot Gris and Pinot Blanc grapes on its south-facing slopes. In the 20th century the cooler climate had restricted the varieties of grape that could grow in Sussex to a range of Germanic varieties.

== Winemaking and styles ==
=== Classification ===
The application for PDO status was the second in the UK after the Camel Valley in Cornwall was submitted in 2012. Sussex was the first major wine area in the UK to apply.

Since protected status was given to Sussex wines in 2016, wine producers must meet stringent quality guidelines in order to display the name of the county on their wines. The first wine to be produced under the Sussex PDO scheme was approved in 2016 for Rathfinny estate. PDO status means that all wines using the name 'Sussex wine' have to be produced in Sussex from grapes grown in Sussex.

The idea came from Jamie Everett, chief operating officer of the Rathfinny estate, one of England's newest vineyards. The consortium, which includes the larger and older vineyards Ridgeview and Bolney estates, has the backing of the UK government. At least half the vineyards supported the bid to give protected status to wine made from grapes grown in Sussex.

== Wineries ==
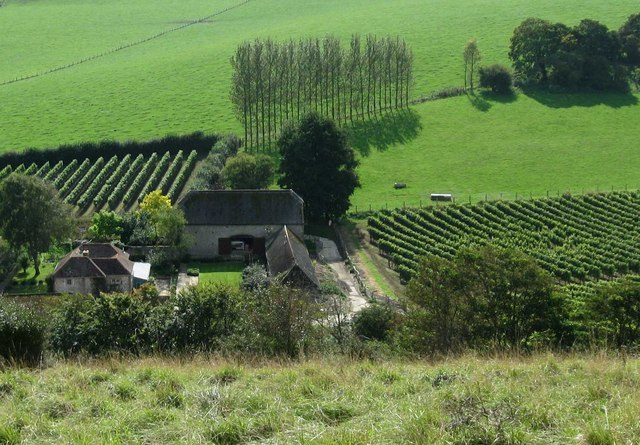
Breaky Bottom Vineyard on the South Downs near Lewes

Sussex boasts the largest and most densely planted cluster of vineyards (23 in total) in the UK. In 2016 wine made in East and West Sussex accounted for about a quarter of the total produced in England.

== See also ==
- Wine from the United Kingdom
- English sparkling wine
- Culture of Sussex
- Beer in Sussex

== Bibliography ==
- Keevill, Graham; Hall, Teresa (2017). Monastic Archaeology: Papers on the Study of Medieval Monasteries. Oxbow Books. ISBN 9781785705670.
