= Still wine =

Wine post-fermentation with low CO2 content

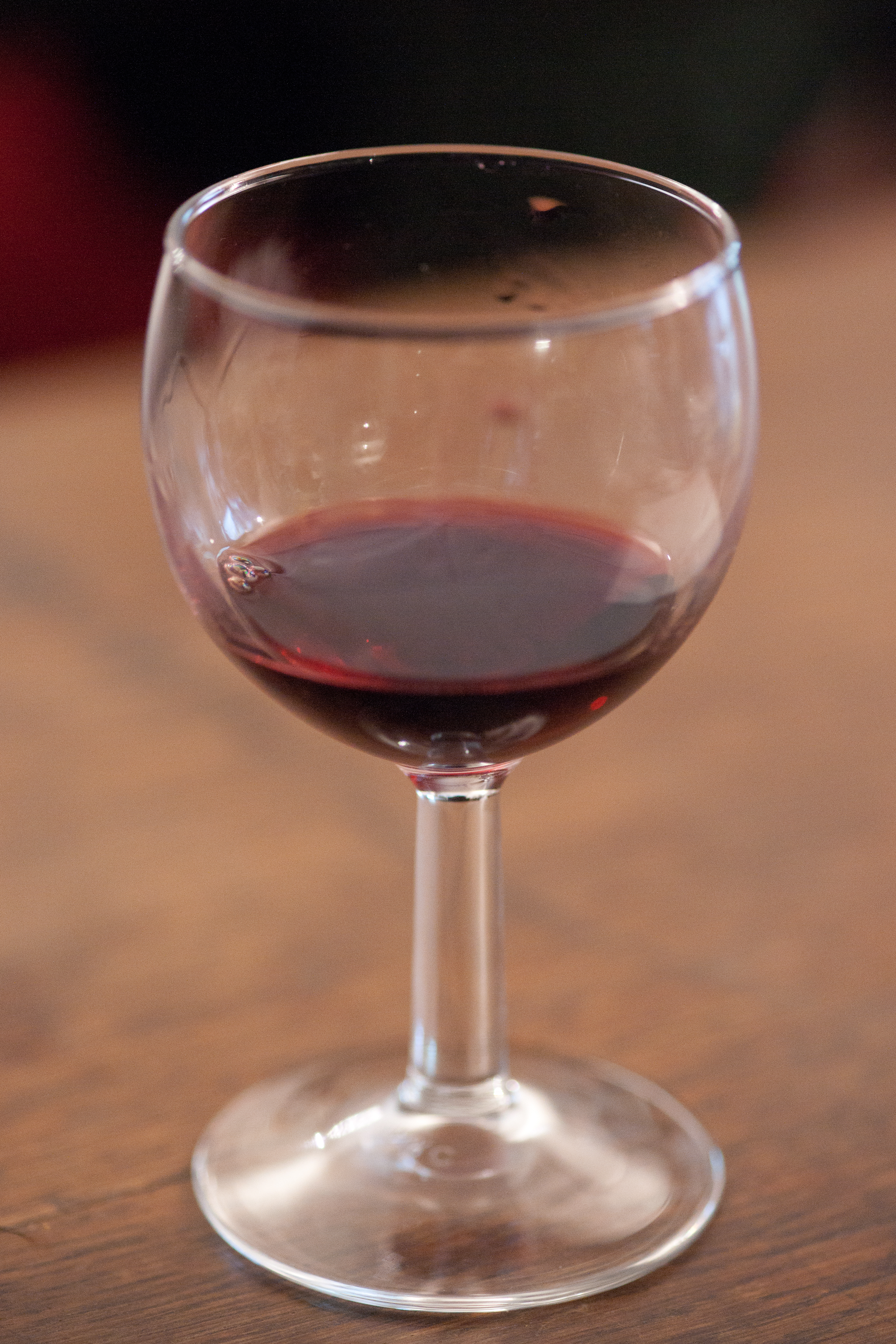
Still red wine

A still wine is defined by the International Organisation of Vine and Wine (OIV) as a wine after the end of fermentation from which no more carbonic acid is developed. Still wine is a wine whose carbon dioxide content is so low that it neither sparkles nor foams. It does not produce bubbles when the bottle is opened, in contrast to sparkling wine. The majority of wines on the market are still wines.

== Differentiation from semi-sparkling and sparkling wine ==
The designation "still" indicates that the wine is not sparkling or foaming and therefore, in contrast to semi-sparkling wine or sparkling wine, contains no or very little carbonic acid. In the European Union law definitions – Alcohol Structure Directive 92/83/EEC from 1992 – a distinction is only made between sparkling and non-sparkling wines and used primarily to define the tax rates. According to the definition of the OIV, semi-sparkling wine is a wine that has a carbon dioxide pressure of 100 to 250 kPa at 20 °C and visibly sparkles. Accordingly, still wine has a maximum carbon dioxide pressure of less than 100 kPa.

Wine type	CO_{2} pressure	
Still wine	0–100 kPa	0–1 bar
Semi-sparkling wine	100–250 kPa	1–2.5 bar
Sparkling wine	300–600 kPa	3–6 bar

== Vinification ==
The vinification of a still wine follows processes without a secondary fermentation. The content of carbon dioxide naturally dissolved by the action of microorganisms is about 2,000 mg/L after fermentation and before aging. This content is controlled to guarantee the typical organoleptic characteristics of a still wine.

=== Fermentations ===
A still wine is vinified by a single alcoholic fermentation. The gas produced during this step escapes naturally, with the dissolved amount depending on its solubility. Unlike sparkling wines, the gas is not intentionally retained by pressurization. Furthermore, malolactic fermentation also produces carbon dioxide, which is released naturally.

=== Adjustment of carbon dioxide content ===
Before bottling, the CO_{2} content can be adjusted to match the wine style (CO_{2} diminishes the "roundness" and adds edges of astringent/bitter polyphenols' flavors). This is achieved through carbonation, which involves the injection of CO_{2} gas into the wine to reach a maximum permitted content of 2,000 mg/L, or through decarbonation, where N_{2} gas is injected to remove excess dissolved carbon dioxide.

== Tasting ==
The tasting of a still wine should be free of effervescence. However, a wine may remain slightly carbonated; A slight tingling can then be perceived on the tongue. In some cases, a slightly elevated CO_{2} content may be desired to provide freshness, particularly in white wines, rosés, or red wines from very hot vintages. The perception of this sensation varies depending on the taster, with the threshold being around 1,000 mg/L of dissolved CO_{2}.

== Legislation and taxation ==
Globally, alcohol tax rates often differ between still and sparkling wines, and according to the type of tax applied. For instance, countries taxing their wine consumers with an ad valorem tax in 2018 included Chile, Mexico, Australia, and South Korea. In these systems, the consumer tax equivalent per bottle is very high for super-premium still and sparkling wines, reaching nearly three times the 42-country average in research by Australian economist Kym Anderson. Conversely, the tax burden is very low for ordinary still wines, falling to less than one-half of the average.

In the United States, federal excise tax rates vary significantly between still and sparkling wines. Following the Omnibus Budget Reconciliation Act of 1990 (OBRA90), the tax rate for most still wine was set at $1.07 per wine gallon, whereas the rate for sparkling wines is considerably higher at $3.40 per wine gallon. These rates translate to an excise tax of approximately $0.21 per 750-milliliter bottle for still wine, compared to $0.67 per bottle for sparkling wine. OBRA90 increased the rates for still wines, but did not change the existing tax rates on champagne and sparkling wines.

French law defines wine as a product resulting from the fermentation of grapes, transforming sugar into alcohol. It distinguishes still wines from sparkling wines. Wines with an alcohol content between 1.2% and 18% by volume that do not release any carbon dioxide when the bottle is opened are considered still wines. This distinction is particularly important for the application of the circulation duty provided for by tax law, the rate of which is €3.78 per hectolitre for still wines, compared to €9.35 per hectolitre for sparkling wines.

Wine is subject to an excise duty in the EU in accordance with Article 7 of Directive 92/83/EEC. The EU set the minimum tax rate to zero in Article 5 of Directive 92/84/EEC. These requirements are implemented in Germany in the Sparkling Wine and Intermediate Products Tax Act as amended on 15 July 2009. Despite this tax exemption, the provisions of the excise duty regulations also apply to wine – at least in cross-border traffic within the EU (Sections 32 and 33 of the Act), which entails a not inconsiderable bureaucratic effort both for the tax administration and the participating companies (Excise Movement and Control System, EMCS).

== Bibliography ==
- Ambrosi, Hans (2002). Wein von A bis Z – Der neue große Ambrosi [Wine from A to Z – The new great Ambrosi] (in German) (Vollst. aktualisierte Ausgabe ed.). Bindlach: Gondrom. ISBN 978-3-8112-2105-5.
- Anderson, Kym (2020). "Consumer Taxes on Alcohol: An International Comparison over Time" (PDF). Journal of Wine Economics. 15 (1): 42–70. doi:10.1017/jwe.2020.2.
- Brockhaus (2005). Der Brockhaus - Wein: Rebsorten, Degustation, Weinbau, Kellertechnik, internationale Anbaugebiete [The Brockhaus - Wine: Grape varieties, tasting, viticulture, cellar technology, international growing regions] (in German). Mannheim / Leipzig: Brockhaus. ISBN 978-3-7653-0281-7.
- Code général des impôts. "Article 438" [Article 438] (in French).
- Congressional Research Service (12 September 2024). "Alcohol Excise Taxes: An Overview". EveryCRSReport.com.
- "Council Directive 92/83/EEC of 19 October 1992 on the harmonization of the structures of excise duties on alcohol and alcoholic beverages" (PDF). Council of the European Union. 19 October 1992.
- Direction de l'information légale et administrative (2016). "Qu'est-ce qu'un vin tranquille ?" [What is a still wine?]. Service Public (in French).
- Jovine, Andrée. "Bien préparer ses vins à la mise en bouteille" [Properly preparing your wines for bottling] (in French). Centre de Recherche et de Développement Œnoagronomique de Suze La Rousse. Archived from the original (PDF) on 20 January 2021.
- Navarre, Colette (2010). L'œnologie [Oenology] (in French). Paris: Tec & Doc. p. 433. ISBN 978-2-7430-1297-7.
- Troost, Gerhard; Bach, Hans Peter; Rhein, Otto H. (1995). Sekt, Schaumwein, Perlwein [Sekt, sparkling wine, semi-sparkling wine] (in German) (2 ed.). Eugen Ulmer. ISBN 3-8001-5818-3.
- Troost, Gerhard (1988). Technologie des Weines [Technology of wine] (in German) (6 ed.). Eugen Ulmer. ISBN 3-8001-5816-7.
