= Negrara =

Variety of grape

Negrara is a red Italian wine grape variety grown in north east Italy including the Veneto region where it is a permitted variety in the Denominazione di origine controllata (DOC) wine Amarone. While the grape was once more widely planted in the region its numbers have been steadily declining for most of the late 20th and early 21st century.

== DOC wines ==
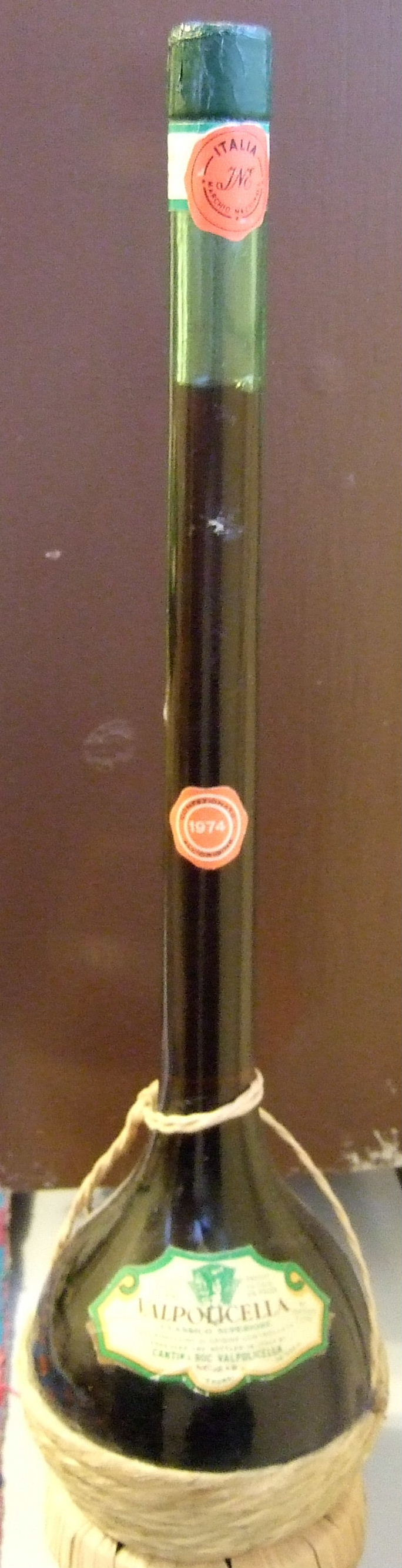
Negrara is a permitted grape in the wines of Valpolicella.

In the Valpolicella region, Negrara is a permitted minor component in the full bodied DOCG straw wine Amarone behind Corvina Veronese (40-70% of the wine), Rondinella (20-40%) and Molinara (5-25%). Along with Barbera and Sangiovese, Negrara can make up to 15% of the wine provided the grapes used for the DOC wine are harvested to a yield no greater than 8 tonnes/hectare. The wines are then aged a minimum of two years prior to release with a minimum alcohol level of 14%. Similar restrictions and blend composition exist for the regular rosso wine of the Valpolicella DOC except that the grapes do not have to be dried prior to fermentation with yields permitted up to 12 tonnes/ha and a minimum alcohol of 11%. A separate Superiore bottling is permitted for wines that have been aged at least one year in oak.

Around Lake Garda Negrara is also permitted in the Bardolino DOC (but not the DOCG wine of Bardolino Superiore) where it can account for up to 10% of the blend behind Corvina (35-65%), Rondinella (10-40%) and Molinara (10-20%) with Rossignola, Barbera, Sangiovese and Garganega allowed to fill in up to 15% of the wine. Here grapes are limited to yield of 13 tonnes/ha with the wines having a minimum alcohol level of 10.5%.

On the southern banks of Lake Garda that spans over into the Lombardy wine region, Negrara can be used in the red and rosé wines of the Garda Colli Mantovani DOC located in the hills of the Mantuan Morainic Amphitheatre. Here the grape is permitted to make up to 15% of the wine along with Molinara and Sangiovese with Cabernet Sauvignon (20-50%), Merlot (20-40%) and Rondinella (20-30%) making up the bulk of the blend. Grapes are limited to a harvest no hreater than 14 tonnes/ha with the finished wine needing a minimum alcohol level of at least 10.5%.

In the Valdadige DOC that spans across the Veneto and Trentino-Alto Adige/Südtirol wine regions, Negrara is a minor component in the red and rosé wines of the DOC behind Schiava (minimum 20%) and Lambrusco (up to 30%). Along with Merlot, Pinot noir, Lagrein and Teroldego, Negrara is permitted to make up the remainder of the blend provided the harvest yields do not exceed 14 tonnes/ha and wine reaches a minimum alcohol level of at least 10.5% for the rosé and 11% for the red.

== Synonyms ==
Over the years Negrara has been known under a variety of synonyms including Barthaeuser, Cabonera, Carbonera, Doleana, Doleara, Doveana, Dovenzana, Edelschwarze, Fraccaroli Nera, Keltertraube, Negrara Comune, Negrara Veronese, Negrera di Gattinara, Negruzo, Negrara Trentina, Nera Fraccaroli, Salzen, Schwarzhottler, Terodola, Tirodola, Zottelwaelsche and Zoveana.
