= Oseleta =

Italian red wine grape variety

- Grape (Vitis)
- Color of berry skin: Black
- Species: Vitis vinifera
- Also called: Oselina, Useleta
- Notable regions: Valpolicella, Italy
- Notable wines: Masi Osar
- Hazards: botrytis
- VIVC number: 16537

Wine characteristics
- General: Dark colour, tannic

Oseleta is a rare, autochthonous red wine grape variety from the Valpolicella area in the Veneto region of Italy. It was almost extinct after the phylloxera blight of the 19th and early 20th centuries, but was rediscovered and replanted in small areas by the wine producer Masi in the early 1980s. The variety is now permitted in the Valpolicella DOC and Amarone DOCG rules, and a small number of wine producers, including Masi, make a varietal wine with it.

== History ==
DNA analysis shows that Oseleta and the grapes Corvina, Molinara and Rondinella are closely related and are likely to have co-evolved together in the Valpolicella area with few common ancestors, along with Dindarella and Pelara. The variety, which was almost extinct due to phylloxera, also fell out of favor due its relatively low yields. Oseleta was rediscovered and replanted in the 1980s by Masi, and is now an officially approved minor blend variety in the Valpolicella wine denominations. The grape is still very rare; the world's total cultivation area in 2010 was about 15 hectares (37 acres), entirely within Italy.

== Viticulture ==
The shoot tips are open, the large leaves are round and not curved. The bunches are cylindrical, densely packed and sometimes winged. The round berries are small and almost black in color, containing large pips. The vine itself is vigorous and disease-resistant. It buds late, providing some protection from frosts, but also ripens late, and is susceptible to botrytis.

== Wines ==
The red wines obtained are strongly colored and rich in tannins.
