= Negrera =

Negrera is used a synonym for several wine grapes including:

- Negrara
- Juan García
- Malbec
