= Molinara (grape) =

Variety of grape

- Grape (Vitis)
- Color of berry skin: Black
- Species: Vitis vinifera
- Also called: Rossara, Rossanella, Brepon Molinaro
- Origin: Veneto region of Italy
- Notable regions: Valpolicella, Bardolino
- Notable wines: Valpolicella DOC (Rosso and Superiore; includes Classico and Valpantena subzones), Recioto della Valpolicella DOCG, Amarone della Valpolicella DOCG, Valpolicella Ripasso DOC, Bardolino DOC, Bardolino Superiore DOCG
- Ideal soil: Chalky clay
- VIVC number: 7899

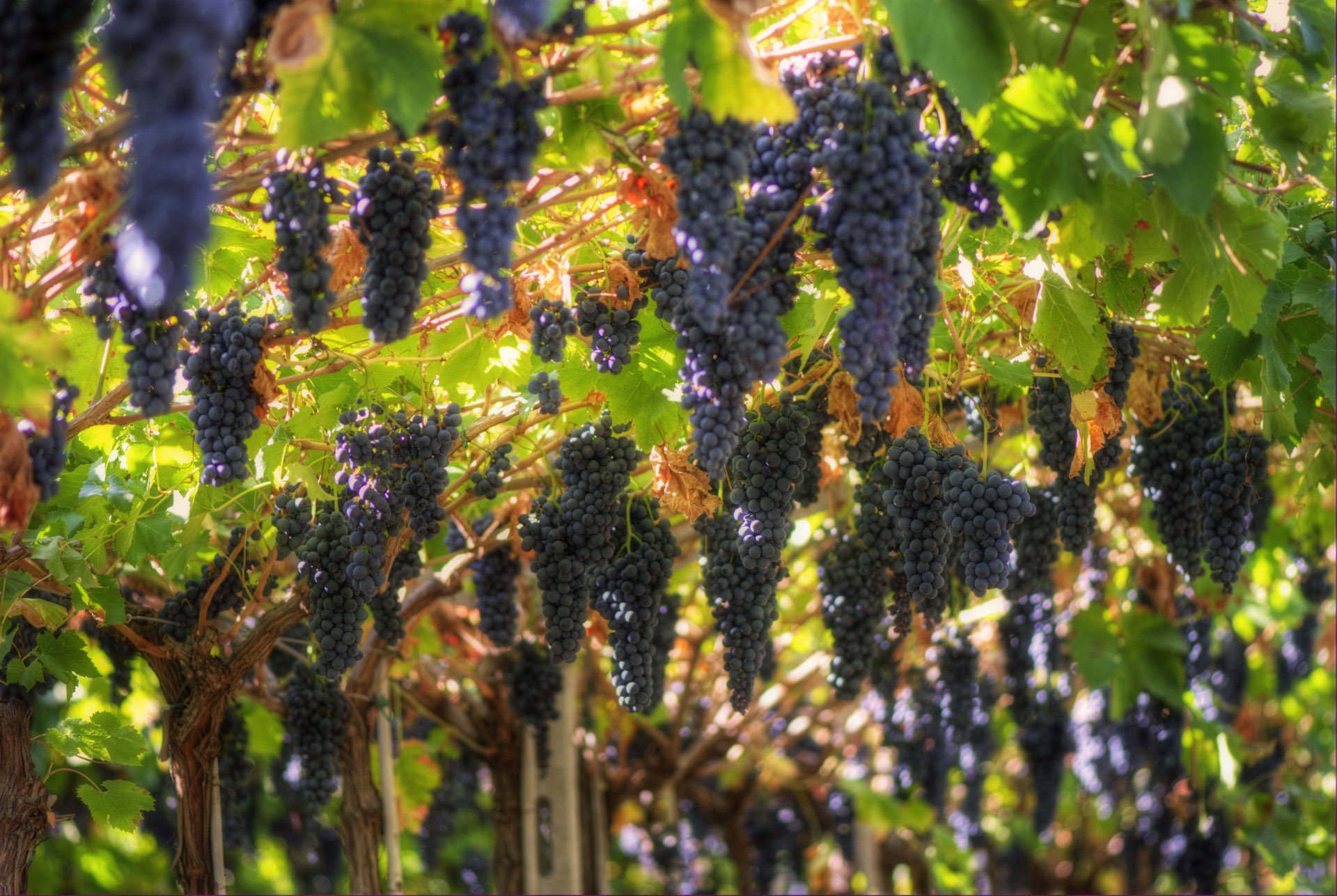
Grapes growing in the Italian wine region of Valpolicella, Veneto.

Molinara is a red Italian wine grape which accounted for 595 hectares (1,470 acres) of planting land in Italy as of 2010, almost exclusively in the Veneto region. It adds acidity to the wines of the Valpolicella and Bardolino regions, which are made with blends of Corvina, Corvinone, Molinara and Rondinella. The wine's high propensity for oxidation, coupled with its low color extract, has caused a decline in favor and plantings among Venetian vineyards, declining in ten years by more than half from an area of 1,301 hectares (3,210 acres) in 2000. There has been debate about whether the grape is purple or blue. This grape is occasionally blended with Merlot to produce soft elegant rosés, and Molinara also accounts for 122 hectares (300 acres) of planting land in Spain.
