= Valpolicella =

Valley and wine region in Verona, Italy

Coordinates: 45.5167°N 10.8833°E

- Wine region
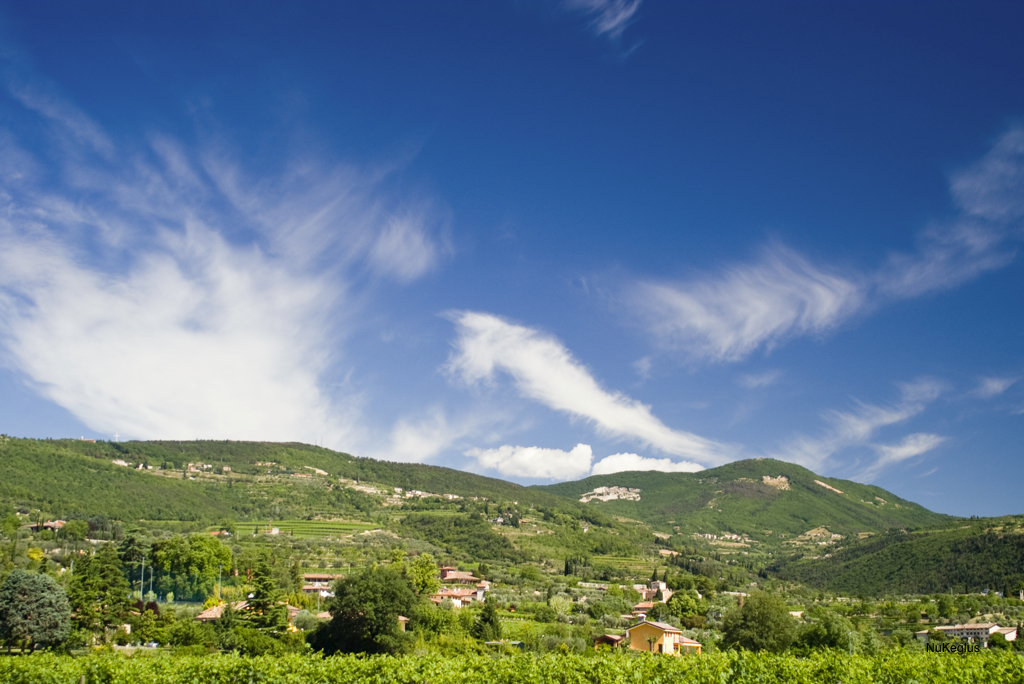
- Vineyards in the Valpolicella region
- Type: Denominazione di origine controllata
- Year established: 1968
- Country: Italy
- Part of: Veneto
- Other regions in Veneto: Bardolino, Soave, Gambellara
- Sub-regions: Valpolicella Classico, Valpantena
- Size of planted vineyards: 7,844 hectares (19,380 acres)
- Varietals produced: Corvina, Corvinone, Rondinella, Molinara
- Wine produced: 152,140 hectolitres (3,347,000 imp gal; 4,019,000 US gal)

The province of Verona within Veneto

Valpolicella (UK: /ˌvælpɒlɪˈtʃɛlə/, US: /ˌvɑːlpoʊl-, ˌvælpoʊl-/, Italian: [ˌvalpoliˈtʃɛlla]; Venetian: Valpołexeła) is a viticultural zone of the province of Verona, Italy, east of Lake Garda. The hilly agricultural and marble-quarrying region of small holdings north of the Adige is famous for wine production. Valpolicella ranks just after Chianti in total Italian denominazione di origine controllata (DOC) wine production.

The red wine known as Valpolicella is typically made from three grape varieties: Corvina Veronese, Rondinella, and Molinara. A variety of wine styles are produced in the area, including a recioto dessert wine and Amarone, a strong wine made from dried grapes. Most basic Valpolicellas are light, fragrant table wines produced in a novello style, similar to Beaujolais nouveau and released only a few weeks after harvest. Valpolicella Classico is made from grapes grown in the original Valpolicella production zone. Valpolicella Superiore is aged at least one year and has an alcohol content of at least 12 percent. Valpolicella Ripasso is a form of Valpolicella Superiore made with partially dried grape skins that have been left over from fermentation of Amarone or recioto.

Winemaking in the region has existed since at least the time of the ancient Greeks. The name "Valpolicella" appeared in charters of the mid-12th century, combining two valleys previously thought of independently. Its etymology is likely from the Latin vallis pulicellae ("valley of river deposits"). Today Valpolicella's economy is heavily based on wine production. The region, colloquially called the "pearl of Verona", has also been a preferred location for rural vacation villas. Seven comuni compose Valpolicella: Pescantina, San Pietro in Cariano, Negrar, Marano di Valpolicella, Fumane, Sant’Ambrogio di Valpolicella and Sant’Anna d’Alfaedo. The Valpolicella production zone was enlarged to include regions of the surrounding plains when Valpolicella achieved DOC status in 1968. In December 2009, the production of Amarone and recioto dessert wines within the Valpolicella DOC received their own separate denominazione di origine controllata e garantita (DOCG) status.

== History ==
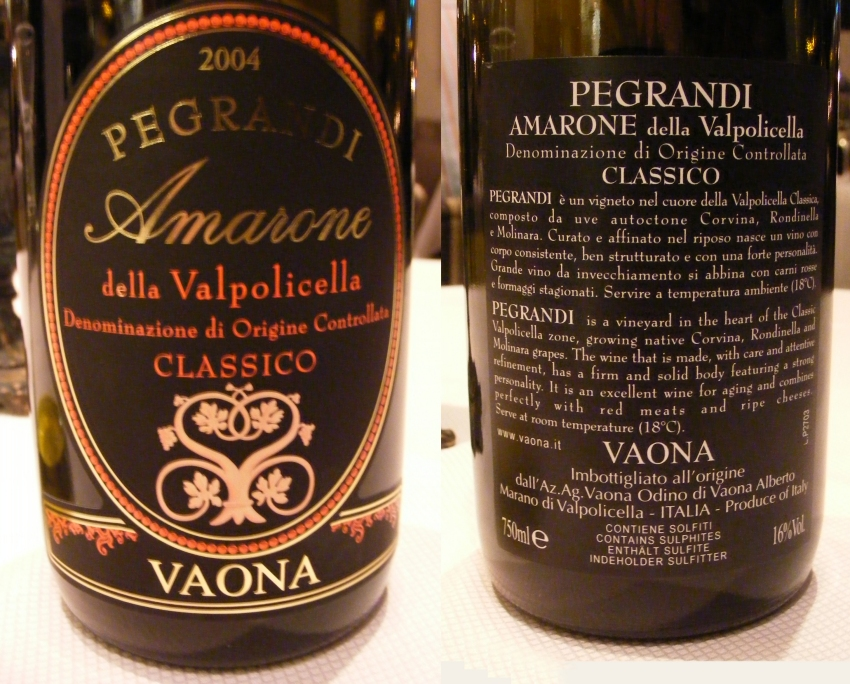
In the late 20th century, a spike in the popularity of Amarone led to increased plantings in the Valpolicella zone.

Viticulture has been used in the Veneto region since at least the time of the ancient Greeks, though the exact period of cultivation for the Valpolicella area is not precisely known. The tradition of using partially dried grapes (seen today in the modern Valpolicella wines of Amarone) was known as the "Greco" or "Greek style" of winemaking, with its origins likely dating back to this period. In the 6th century AD, the Roman writer Cassiodorus notes that the sweet wines of the area were favorites in the courts of the Ostrogothic Kingdom of Italy. Since the 8th century AD, the Republic of Venice was long a vital trading port in the Mediterranean, linking the Byzantine Empire with the rest of Europe. Merchants records shows that one of the items regularly traded through Venice was local wines produced in Verona province in the hills west of Venice. During the 15th and 16th century, struggles with the Ottoman Turks led to frequent blockades of the Venetian ports, limiting the amount of available export wines from the Greek isles and abroad. This further stimulated the development of domestic vineyards for the Venetians, who pushed even further into the hills of the Verona and the Valpolicella region.

The 19th century brought a series of calamities to most wine-producing regions including the phylloxera epidemic, oidium, downy mildew and the political upheaval of the Risorgimento. According to the 1889 writings of the French wine historian Dr. C. B. Cerletti, one of the few Italian wine regions to emerge from this period relatively unscathed was Valpolicella. In the 1950s, the "Amarone" style of winemaking was rediscovered. In 1968, the Valpolicella region received official recognition for quality wine production when it was granted its own DOC. However, with DOC recognition also came a large expansion of vineyard areas that were permitted to produce Valpolicella DOC wine, including land in the fertile plains of the Po River, which tend to produce large yields of grapes with varying qualities. Additionally, the grape composition for Valpolicella wines was expanded to include varieties of lower potential quality such as Molinara and Rondinella. This led to a general drop in quality, which had a detrimental impact not only on the area's reputation in the international wine market but also on sales and prices. As winemaking became less profitable, the vineyards in the most labor-intensive areas (such as the hillsides in the classico zone) were uprooted and abandoned. This shifted the source of grape production even further away from the better quality producing hillside regions down to the fertile plains.

In the 1980s and 1990s, the Amarone wines of Valpolicella experienced a spike in popularity on the world's wine market. Production of Amarone jumped from 522,320 US gallons (19,772 hectoliters) in 1972 to 1.2 million gallons (46,500 hl) by 1990. By 2000 Amarone production grew to over 3.9 million gallons (148,000 hl). By this point, the price for grapes destined for Amarone production was nearly three times higher than what a comparable quantity of grapes would fetch for basic Valpolicella production. This sparked renewed interest in planting vineyards in the high altitude hillside locations that produced lower yields of grapes better suited for Amarone production. In the 21st century, the reputation of Valpolicella wines continued to expand on the world's wine market, as ambitious winemakers began to invest more in advanced viticultural and winemaking techniques that produce higher quality wines. In 2003, the DOC regulations were adjusted to eliminate mandatory blending requirements for sub-quality grapes such as Molinara. At the end of 2009, the production of both Amarone and recioto dessert wines in the Valpolicella zone received Italy's highest quality wine designation as a DOCG zones.

== Climate and geography ==
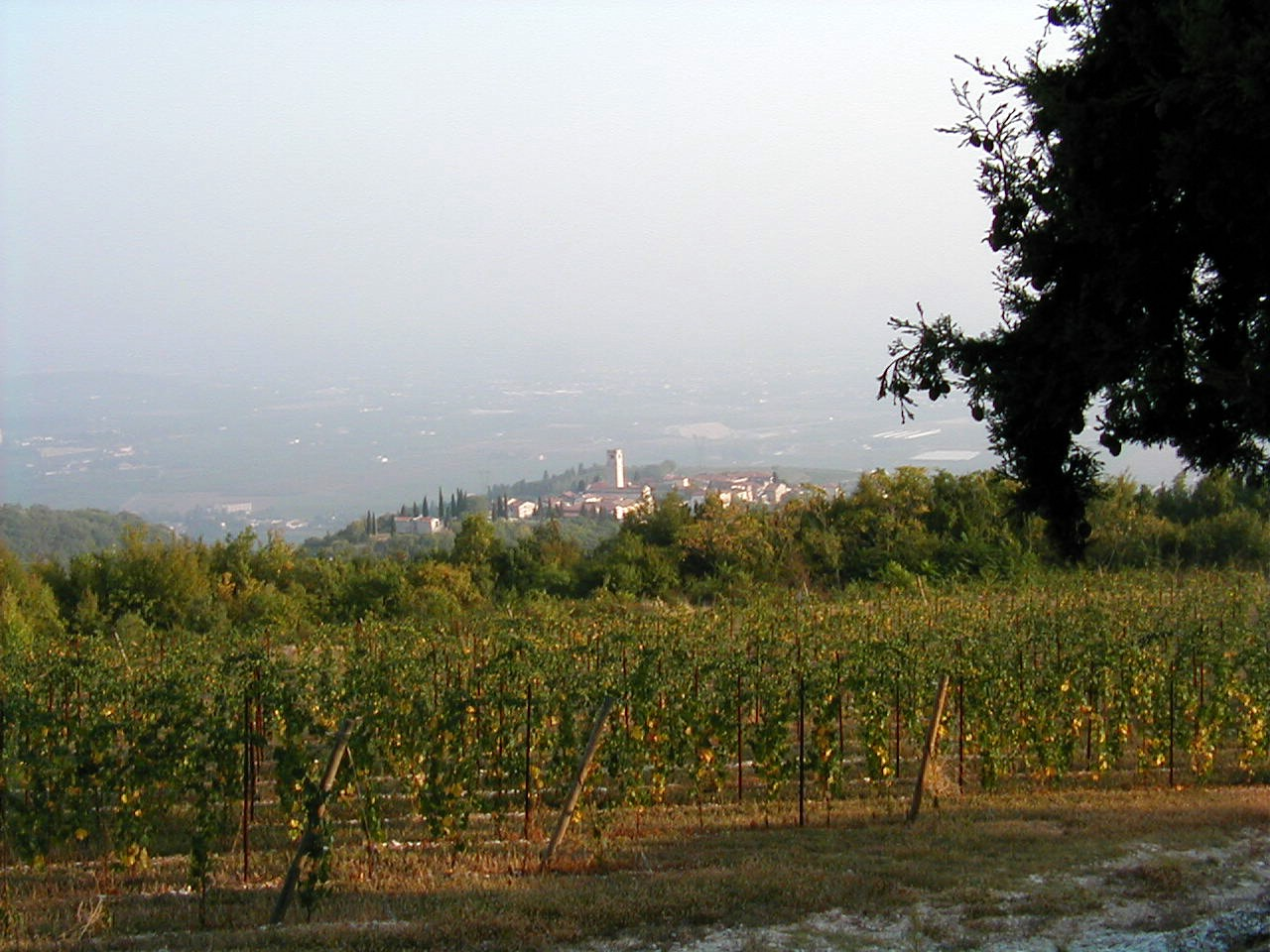
A vineyard in Valpolicella

The Valpolicella region has mostly a mild to cool continental climate that is influenced by its proximity to two sizable bodies of water-Lake Garda to the west and the Adriatic Sea to the southeast. The coolest regions are in the Monti Lessini foothills to the north, where cool winds blow southward from the Alps. This area is traditionally classified as the classico zone. Towards the south and east, the climate gets warmer in the fertile plains of the Adige river. The mean temperature in the growing season is usually around 74.5 °F (23.6 °C), with average rainfall around 34 inches (860 mm).

The vineyard soils of the region range from morainic gravel near Lake Garda to more dolomite residual gravel with alluvial deposits in the fertile central plains. Towards the east and near the Soave DOC are several areas featuring volcanic soils. The most favorably situated vineyards are located in the Monti Lessini foothills in the classico zone where the grapes ripen at altitudes between 490 to 1,500 feet (150–460 metres).

== Wine regions ==
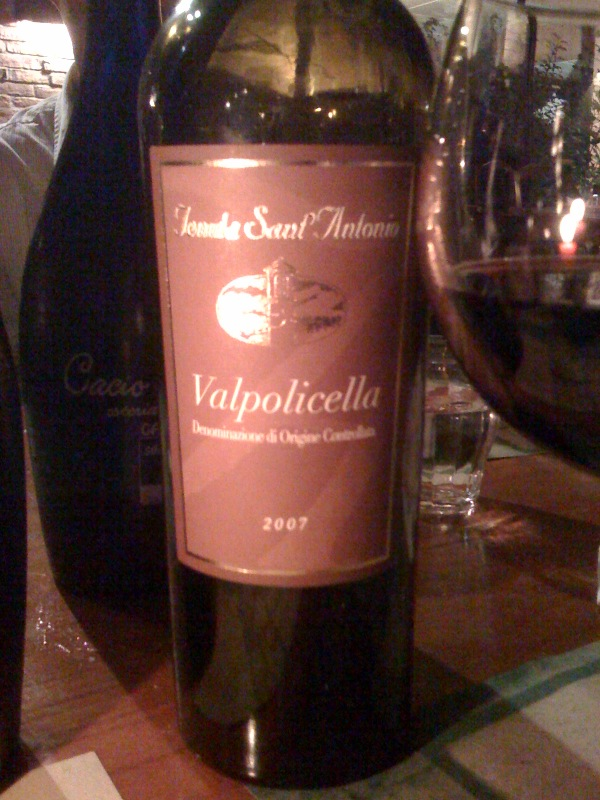
A bottle and glass of Valpolicella DOC wine

The Valpolicella zone is bordered to the west by the Bardolino DOC, located along the banks of Lake Garda, which produces similar wines to basic Valpolicella using many of the same grapes. The historical "heart" of Valpolicella winemaking is in the Monti Lessini hills located northwest of Verona. In 1968, the boundaries of the region were extended far eastward towards the DOC production zone of Soave and south to the plains of the northern bank of the Po river and the Adige.

Today the original zone is known as Valpolicella Classico zone and may duly noted on the wine labels of wines produced completely from grapes grown in this area. Today over 40% of all wine production in Valpolicella takes place in the classico zone, with an estimated yearly production of 12.2 million gallons (460,000 hl). Another sub-zone that is permitted to attach its name to the wine is the Valpolicella Valpantena located in the valley located just east of Verona.

== Grapes and wine styles ==
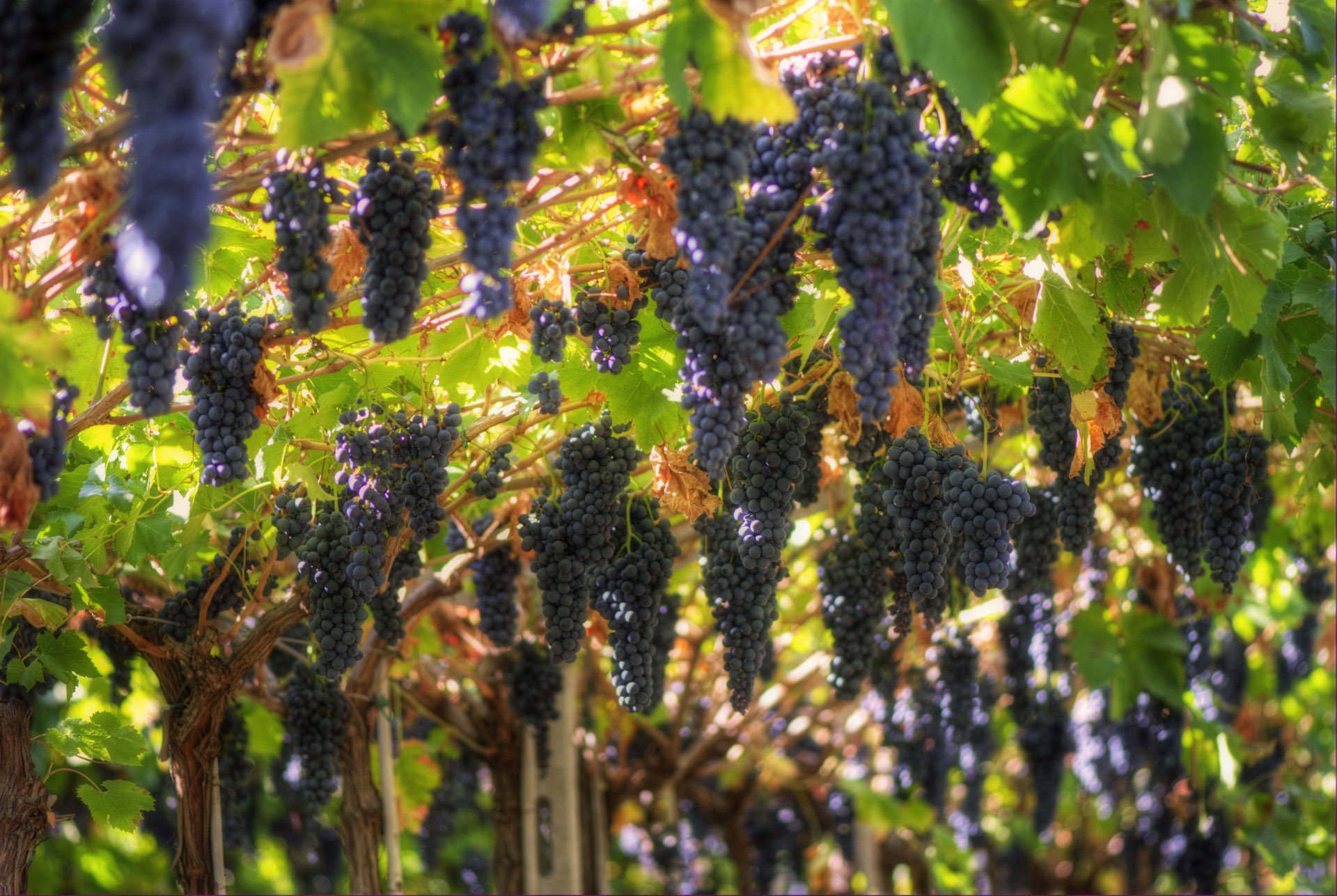
Only red wine grapes are permitted in the Valpolicella DOC wines.

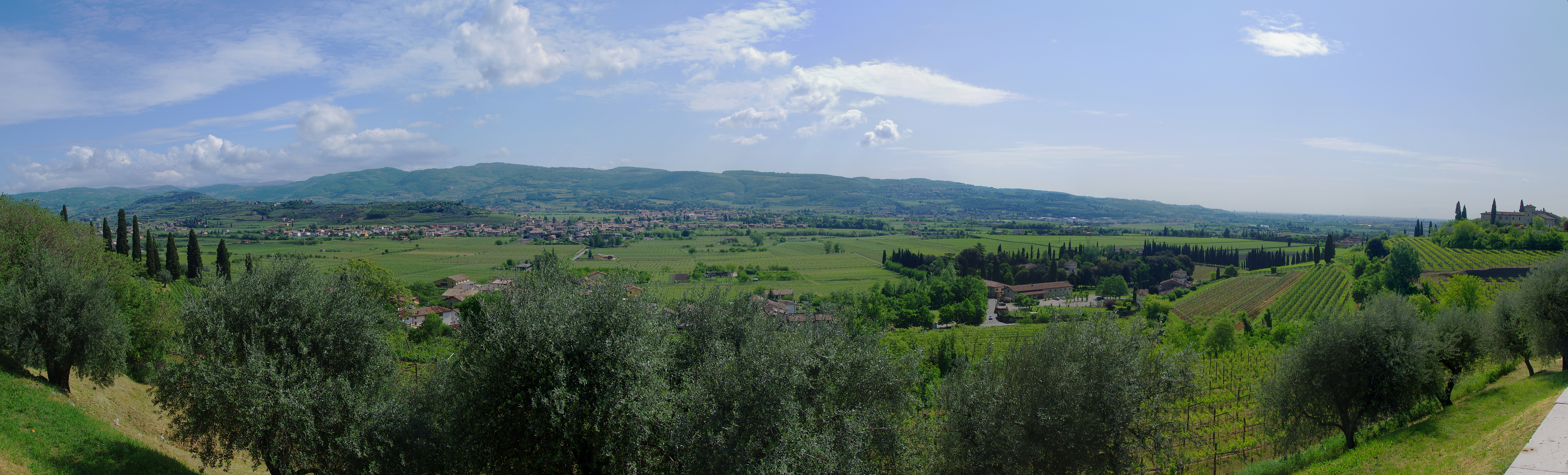
View from Castelrotto hill (San Pietro in Cariano) to Pedemonte, Arbizzano and Montericco hill

Most of the wines produced under the Valpolicella DOC are red and usually contain a sizable amount of the area's most distinguished grape, Corvina. Other grapes used in the production of Valpolicella wine most often include Rondinella and Corvinone, but also Molinara, Rossignola, Negrara, Barbera, Sangiovese and Bigolona. A few producers are experimenting with reviving the indigenous grape Oseleta in Valpolicella. The wines are produced in a wide variety of styles ranging from basic nouveau table wines, full-bodied red wines, sweet dessert wines and even sparkling spumante. The most basic Valpolicella are light-bodied and often served slightly chilled. They have many characteristics similar to a Beaujolais wine and are often noted for their sour cherry flavor. While full-bodied recioto and Amarone styles reach alcohol levels of 15–16%, most Valpolicellas have more moderate alcohol levels around 11%. For wines labeled Valpolicella Superiore the wines must be aged a minimum of one year in wood and reach a minimum alcohol level of 12%.

=== Recioto ===
The sweet red dessert wine Recioto della Valpolicella was awarded its own separate DOCG status in 2010 and has been the style historically associated with the region. The name recioto, also made in neighbouring Soave and Gambellara regions with their own DOCG designations, comes from the local dialect recie, meaning "ears", and refers to the extending lobes that appear as "ears" at the top of a grape cluster. The exposed grapes on the "ears" usually receive the most direct sunlight and become the ripest grapes on the cluster. Historically these very ripe "ears" were picked separately and used to make very rich, sweet wines. Today the method for making recioto has evolved to include the use of whole grape clusters. Grapes destined for Recioto della Valpolicella are often grown in the most ideally situated hillside vineyards. Recioto can trace its origins to winemaking techniques of the ancient Greeks; the grapes are taken to special drying rooms where they are allowed to desiccate, concentrating the sugars inside the grape.

While recioto is typically sweet, with high levels of residual sugar, the must can be allowed to ferment completely dry. Often producers will label this wine as Amarone, but they may also choose to produce it as Valpolicella DOC wine or even an indicazione geografica tipica (IGT) table wine if they choose to use grape blends outside the DOC requirement. Some producers are experimenting with international varieties and producing dry Amarone style wines from grapes such as Cabernet Sauvignon.

=== Ripasso ===
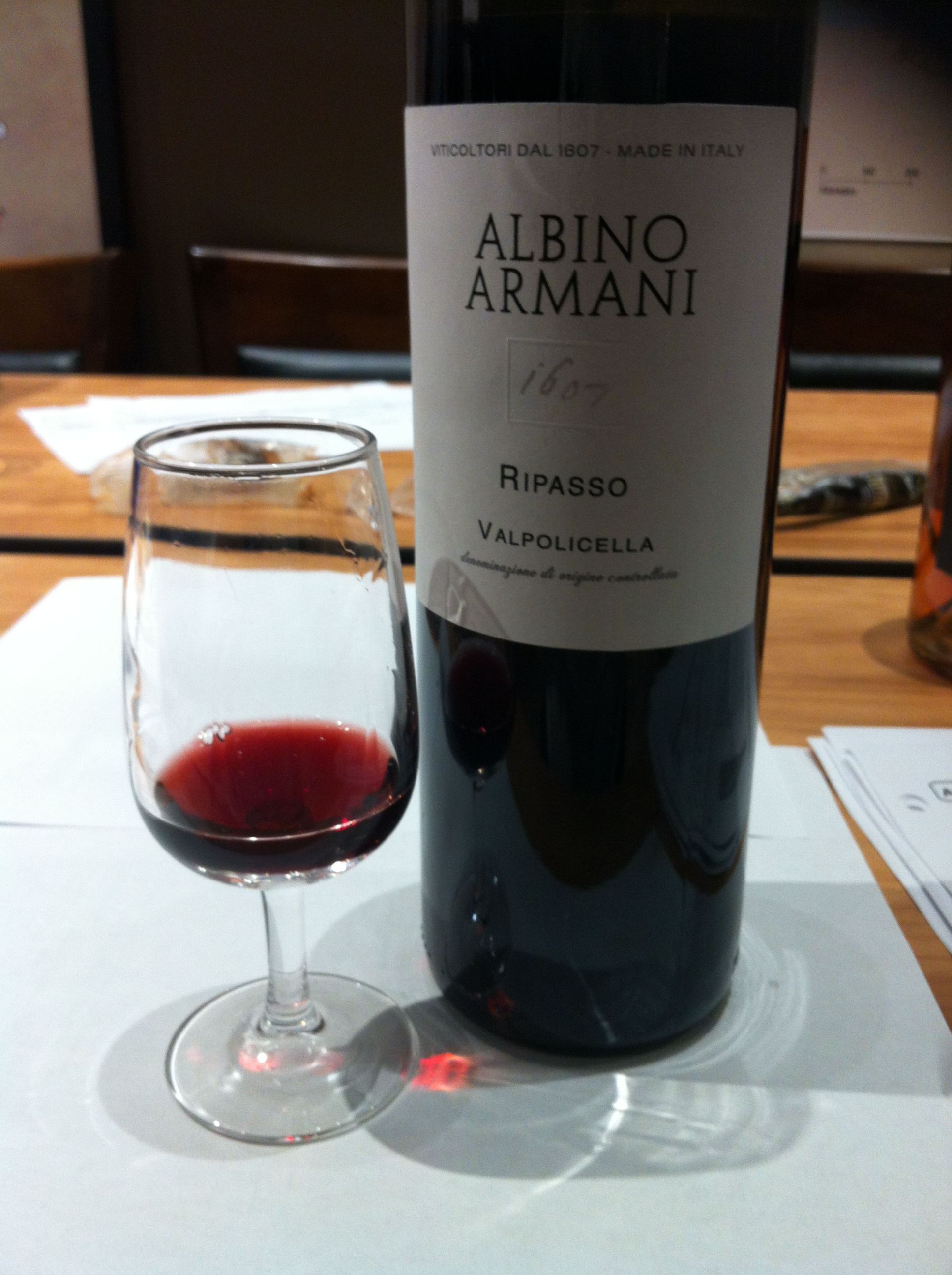
A ripasso wine from Valpolicella

In the late 20th century, a new style of wine known as ripasso (meaning 'repassed') emerged. With this technique, the pomace of leftover grape skins and seeds from the fermentation of recioto and Amarone are added to the batch of Valpolicella wines for a period of extended maceration. The additional food source for the remaining fermenting yeast helps boost the alcohol level and body of the wines while also leaching additional tannins, glycerine and some phenolic compounds that contribute to a wine's complexity, flavor and color. As the production of Amarone has increased in the 21st century, so too has the prevalence of ripasso style wines appearing in the wine market, with most Amarone producers also producing a ripasso as a type of "second wine". An alternative method is to use partially dried grapes, instead of leftover pomace, which contain less bitter tannins and even more phenolic compounds.

The first Valpolicella producer to commercially market a ripasso wine was Masi in the early 1980s. When the style first became popular in the late 20th century, it was rarely noted on the wine label. There was also debate about whether it was even permitted to be included under DOC regulations. If it was mentioned at all it was relegated to the back label wine description notes. Today the term ripasso is freely permitted to be used, with several examples on the wine market labeled as being made in the ripasso style. In late 2009, Ripasso della Valpolicella received its own DOC designation.

=== Amarone ===
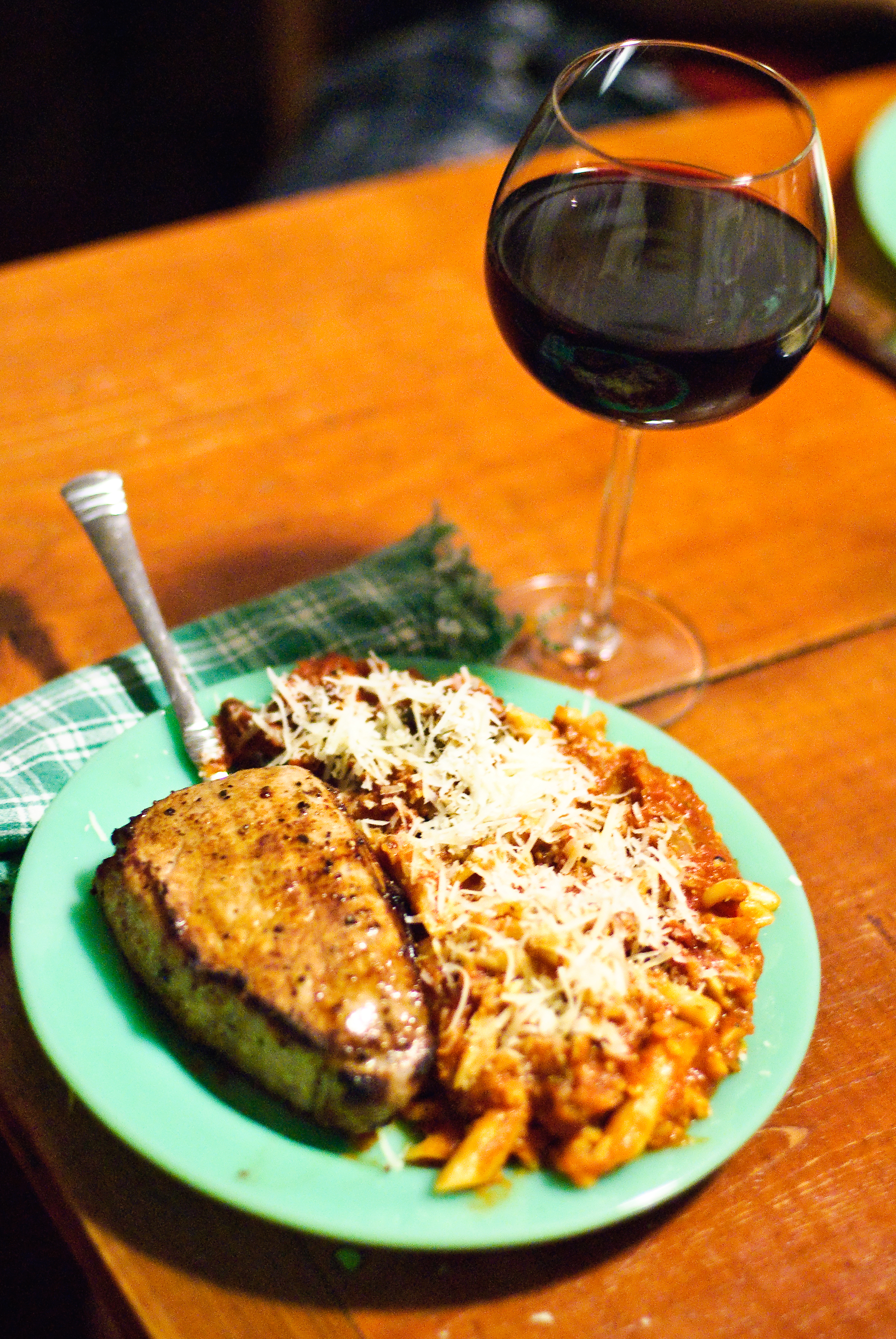
Amarone is often paired with heavy and robust dishes.

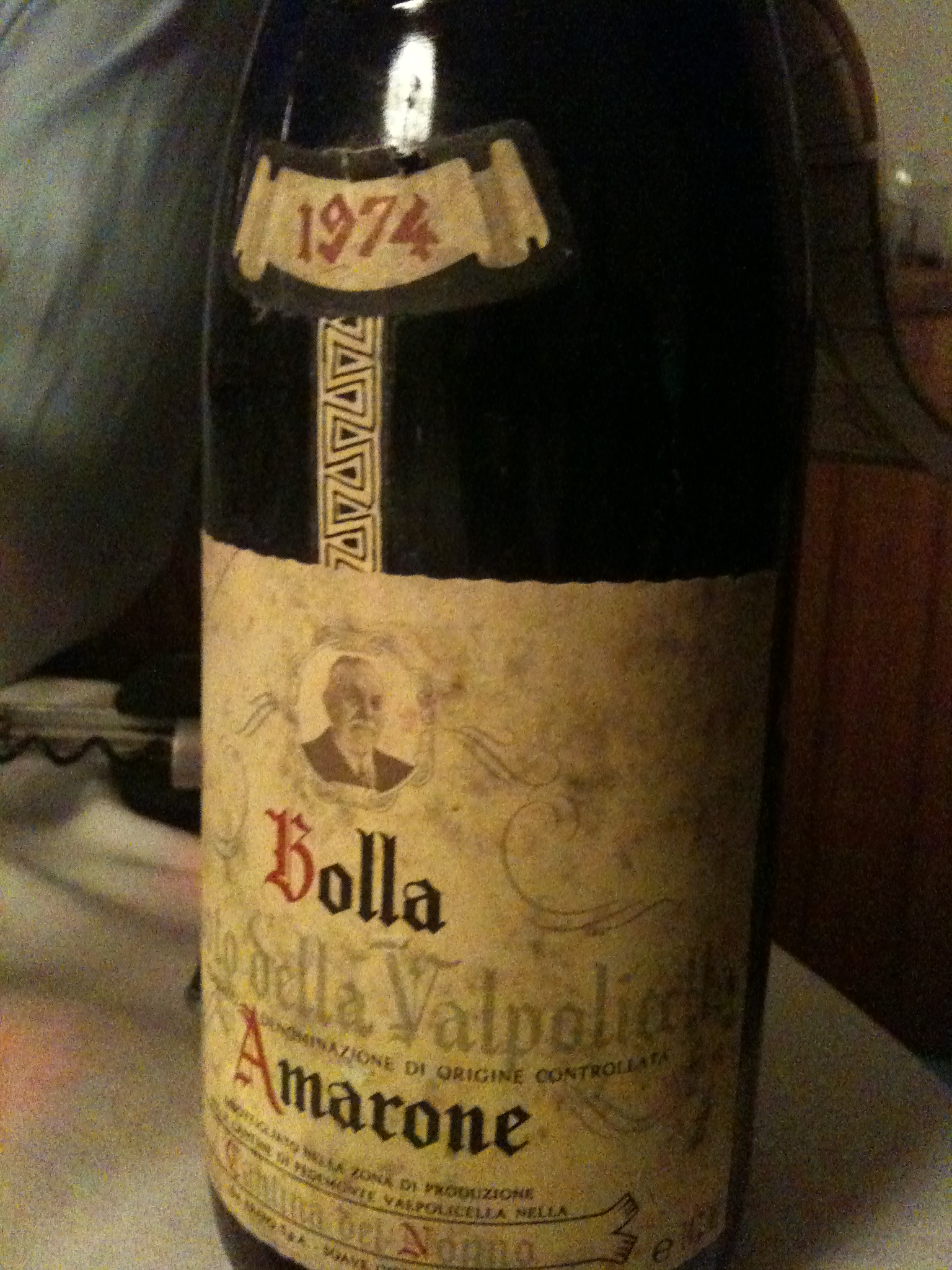
Bolla was one of the first producers to commercially market an Amarone wine from Valpolicella.

While the style of Amarone has existed in the region for centuries, it was very rarely made as a deliberate wine style. Mostly it was produced in warm vintages when batches of wines destined for sweet recioto were unintentionally allowed to ferment completely dry. The modern concept of Amarone has its roots in the early 1950s when producers "rediscovered" the style and began deliberately using yeast strains that could ferment the high levels of sugars in the wine completely into alcohol. The first completely dry Amarones that were commercially marketed were the 1953 vintages produced by Bolla and Bertani. In 2009, the production of Amarone wine in the Valpolicella zone achieved DOCG status. During the petitioning process, the wine producers in the region established several quality control regulations including quotas on the amount of grapes grown in the fertile plains that could be used in Amarone production. Another measure was the 2003 removal of Molinara from the list of mandatory blending grapes.

Amarone is unique in the wine world. Typically very alcoholic, full-bodied and ripe-tasting wines are produced in very warm climate regions, where the grapes are able to build up large amounts of sugar while ripening on the vine. Examples of warm climate regions include parts of Australia, California and southern Italy. The Valpolicella region is characterized as a "cool climate region" where acid levels are usually maintained and sugar build occurs more slowly in the vine. Grapes destined for Amarone are the last grapes in Valpolicella to be harvested, getting as ripe as they can before mold and rot set in. The sugars in the grapes are then concentrated by a process of desiccation where they are kept in special drying rooms for anywhere from three to four months. During this time over a third of the water is removed as the grapes shrivel into raisins. This method (known as passito) produces more concentrated grapes that still maintain the acid balance of a cool-climate grape. Amarones differ from other late harvest wines in that the presence of Botrytis cinerea is actively discouraged, as winemakers attempt to avoid the smoky, mouldy flavors that come with botrytized wine. Extra care is taken in the vineyard to ensure that the grapes are kept dry and harvested before rot can develop.

The Amarones are then aged for several years, with many premium examples being aged for at least five years prior to release. They are often aged in large wooden barrels of either Slavonian or French oak. Traditionally the barrels are older and essentially "neutral", in that they do not impart much flavor or wood tannins, but in the late 20th and early 21st centuries more Amarone producers have been experimenting with the use of smaller new oak barrels that introduce more oak flavoring to the wine.

Amarones are rich, full-bodied wines with flavor and aroma notes that are often compared to the flavors of Port wine. The wines often have notes of mocha, bitter-sweet dark chocolate, raisin, dried fig and earthy flavors. At restaurants sommeliers will often recommend food and wine pairings for Amarone with hearty, heavy dishes such as meat roasts. A classic after-dinner assortment is Amarone paired with walnuts and Parmigiano-Reggiano cheese. Master of wine Mary Ewing-Mulligan notes that well-made examples of Amarone from favorable vintages usually need about ten years of bottle aging for the flavors to mature, and have the potential to continue developing for twenty years or more.

== See also ==
- Parish Church of San Giorgio di Valpolicella
- Vicariate of Valpolicella
