= Venetian wine =

Italian wine produced in Veneto, Italy

Veneto
- Wine region
- Type: Italian wine
- Year established: 1968
- Years of wine industry: 1968-present
- Country: Italy
- Soil conditions: Alluvial, clay, limestone, volcanic in some areas
- Grapes produced: 50% white varieties, 50% red varieties
- Varietals produced: Red: Corvina, Rondinella, Molinaro, Cabernet Sauvignon, Merlot; White: Garganega, Pinot Grigio, Glera, Trebbiano, Chardonnay
- Official designations: 7 DOCG including Amarone della Valpolicella, Prosecco Superiore, Soave Classico; 20+ DOCs including Valpolicella DOC, Soave DOC, Bardolino DOC; Several IGTs including Veneto IGT

Location of Veneto wine region in Italy

Venetian wine is produced in Veneto, a highly productive wine region in northeastern Italy.

The broader area comprising Veneto, Friuli-Venezia Giulia and Trentino-Alto Adige/Südtirol is known collectively as the Tre Venezie, after the Republic of Venice. Veneto is the most populous and biggest denominazione di origine controllata (DOC) producer of the three regions. Although the Tre Venezie collectively produces more red wine than white, the Veneto region produces more whites under DOC and is notably home to the Prosecco and Soave wines.

The region is protected from the harsh northern European climate by the Alps, the foothills of which form Veneto's northern extremes. These cooler climes are well-suited to white varieties like Garganega (the main grape for Soave wines), while the warmer Adriatic coastal plains, river valleys, and Lake Garda zone are the places where the renowned Valpolicella, Amarone and Bardolino DOC reds are produced.

== Red wines: Valpolicella, Amarone and Bardolino ==
The native red grape varieties Corvina and Rondinella have been grown in the area for centuries and are used in wines such as Amarone, Valpolicella and Bardolino. Valpolicella is ruby red when young and turns garnet with age.

The famous red wine from Veneto is Amarone. The dense, rich, and often expensive wine is made from air-dried, resinated grapes. The Amarone also has a sweeter version that's called Recioto.

On the right bank of Lake Garda the vine thrives on moraine hills with gravel and sand, where they produce Bardolino wines.

== White wines: Soave and Gambellara ==
The most popular grape variety in the Veneto wine region is white Garganega, which is the predominant grape for Soave and Gambellara wines. This wine is one of the most popular white wines from Veneto region. It produces fragrant white wines with a fine lemon and almond flavour making it one of the most renowned Italian whites.

The Soave must be at least 70% from the Garganega grape pressed and stored for at least eight months if he wants to get the coveted designation Classico.

In Veneto, two different wine areas are clearly distinguishable: an eastern part, close to the Venetian Lagoon between the hills of Treviso, the plain of Piave river and Adriatic coast, where it is typical to produce the famous Prosecco (Glera), and other varieties are grown like Merlot, Carménère, Verduzzo, Raboso Piave, Refosco, Tocai, Verdiso, Marzemino; and the western part, close to Lake Garda and the city of Verona, famous for the wines based on the varieties Corvina, Rondinella, Garganega, Trebbiano of Soave, and Oseleta.

In the central part of Veneto the winemaking transitions between the varieties and styles of the Eastern and Western parts. In that area you can find the Colli Euganei, the hills close to Padua, that is a special Mediterranean microclimatic zone; it is even famous for the Moscato fior d'arancio production, a sparkling dessert wine.

Another area in the northcenter of Veneto, close to Asiago, is Breganze, where the dessert wine Torcolato is produced with the Vespaiola grape.

The traditional vine training system of the eastern part is the Sylvoz system, today replaced by the Guyot system, while in the western part there is more traditionally the Pergola system. Veneto's growers use modern growing methods and systems in the vineyard and for wine making. While most of the 'classic' wines from this area are based on native grape varieties, like Glera (formerly known as Prosecco) and Verduzzo, high demand for Veneto wines in the European and US markets has galvanized the region's producers into experimentation with Cabernets, Chardonnay and Pinot varieties, among others.

One of Italy's leading wine schools, Conegliano, is based here and the nation's most important wine fair, Vinitaly, takes place each spring in Verona.

Veneto is the 8th largest region of Italy in land mass, and a population of 4,371,000 ranks it 6th in that regard. It has over 90,000 hectares (220,000 acres) of vineyards, of which 35,400 are acclaimed DOC. Annual production totals 8,500,000 hectolitres, 1,700,000 or 21% of which is DOC, making it the biggest DOC producer in Italy. White wine accounts for 55% of the DOC production in Veneto.

== Gallery ==
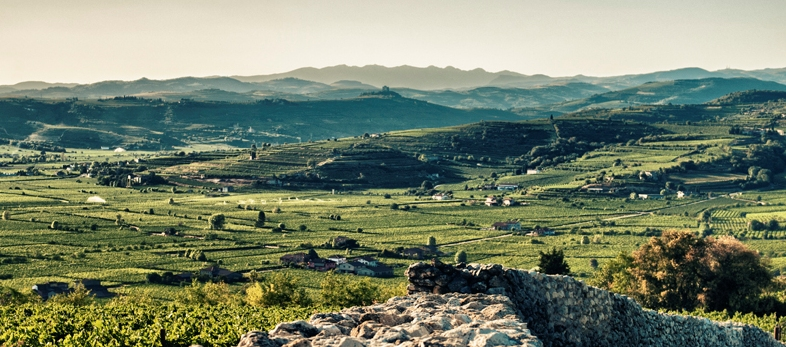
Vineyards in Soave, Veneto

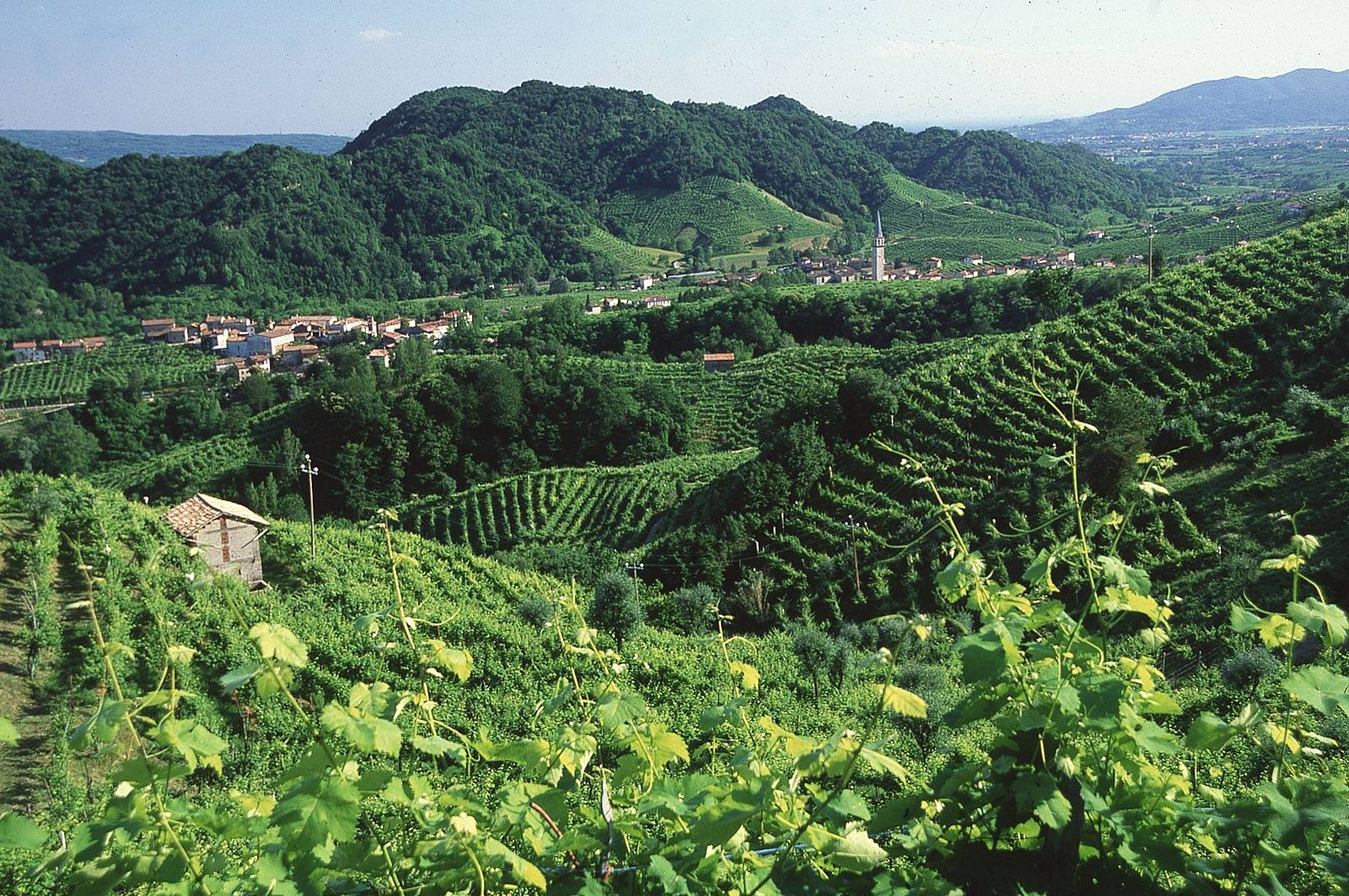
Prosecco Valley, UNESCO

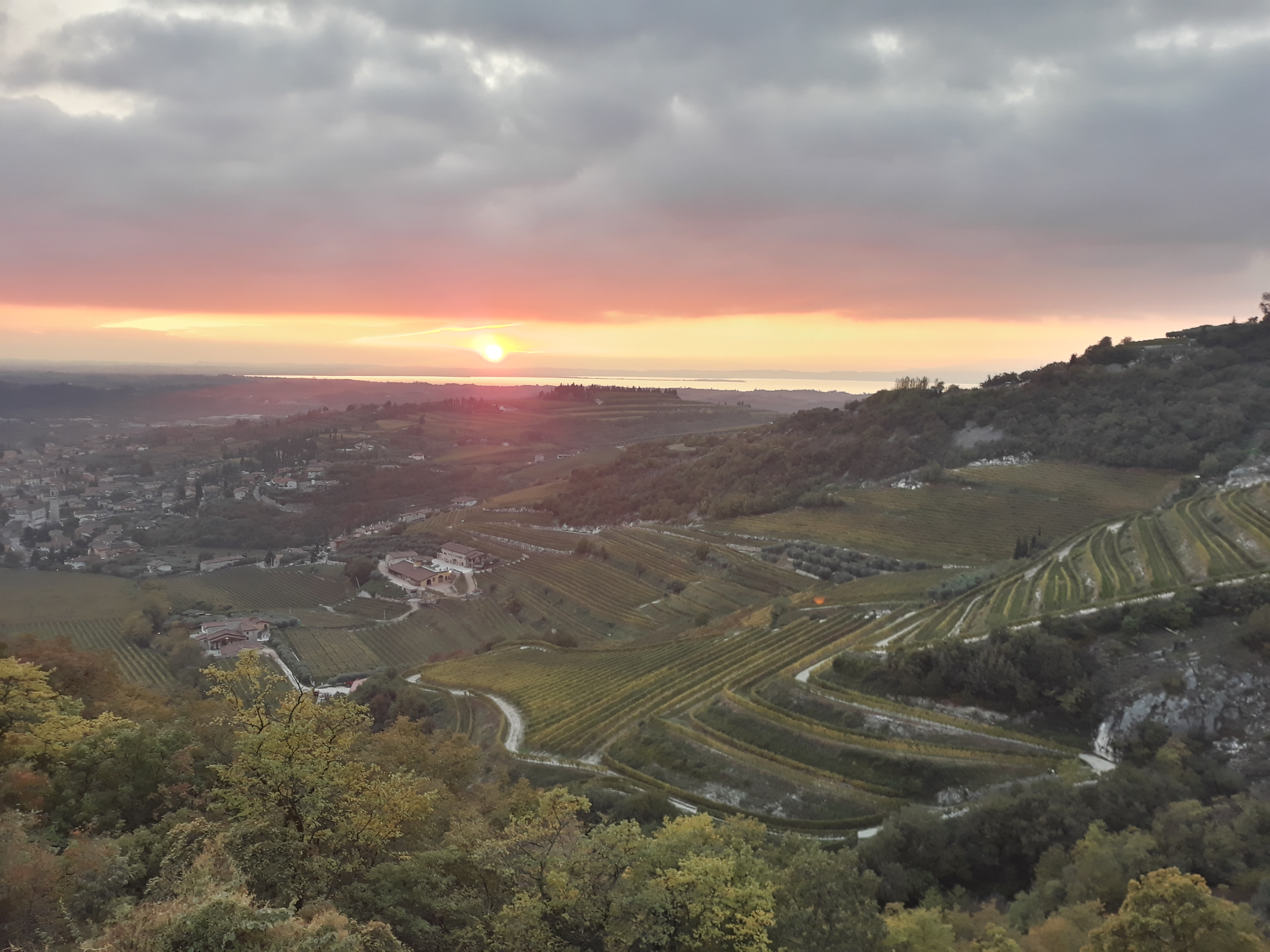
Vineyards in Valpolicella

== See also ==
- Rossignola – a native grape variety growing in Veneto since at least the early 19th century
