= Rossignola =

Variety of grape

Rossignola is a red Italian wine grape variety that is grown in the Veneto wine region of northeast Italy. The variety was first mentioned growing in the province of Verona in the early 19th century and today is a permitted blending variety in several Denominazione di origine controllata (DOC) wines of the Veneto including Bardolino and Valpolicella.

== History and relationship to other grapes ==
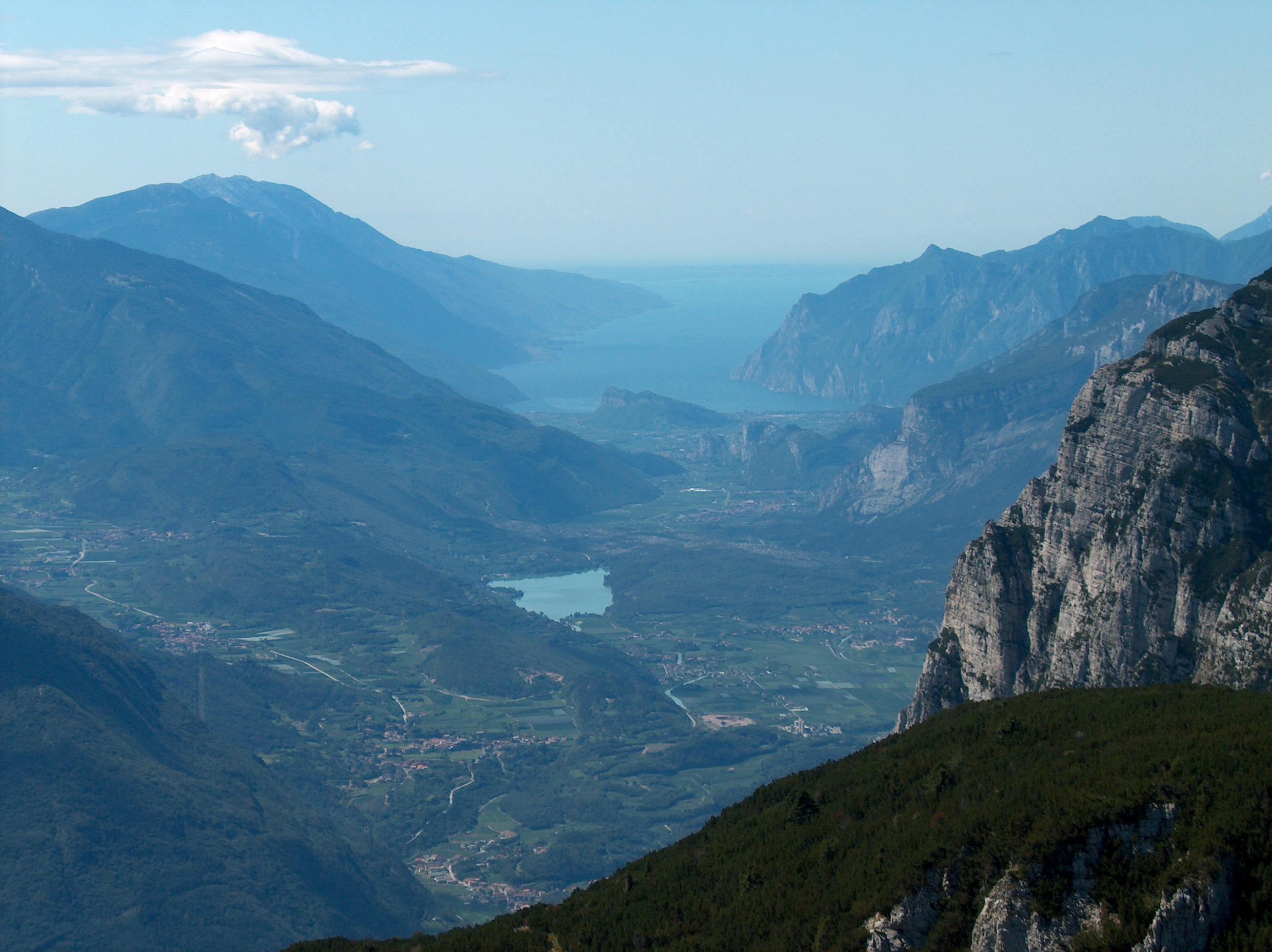
Rossignola has been grown in the Verona province, including around Lake Garda (pictured), but it is a distinct variety from the ancient Lake Garda grape Rosetta di Montagna.

The Italian botanist Ciro Pollini (1782–1833) noted that Rossignola was growing in Verona at least as early as 1818. The synonyms Rossetta del Lago and Rossignola di Montagna has led to some speculation that the grape was related to the nearly extinct and no longer commercially cultivated Lake Garda variety Rosetta di Montagna but according to Master of Wine Jancis Robinson and Swiss geneticist Dr. José Vouillamoz the two varieties are distinct. A similarity in synonyms also leads to Rossignola often being confused with the Lombardy wine grape Rossola nera that is an offspring of Nebbiolo.

== Viticulture ==
Rossignola nera is a late ripening variety that can be very vigorous and high yielding if not kept in check by winter pruning and green harvesting. The vine is very susceptible to a number of viticultural hazards including powdery and downy mildew, Esca, sour rot and botrytis bunch rot.

== Wine regions ==
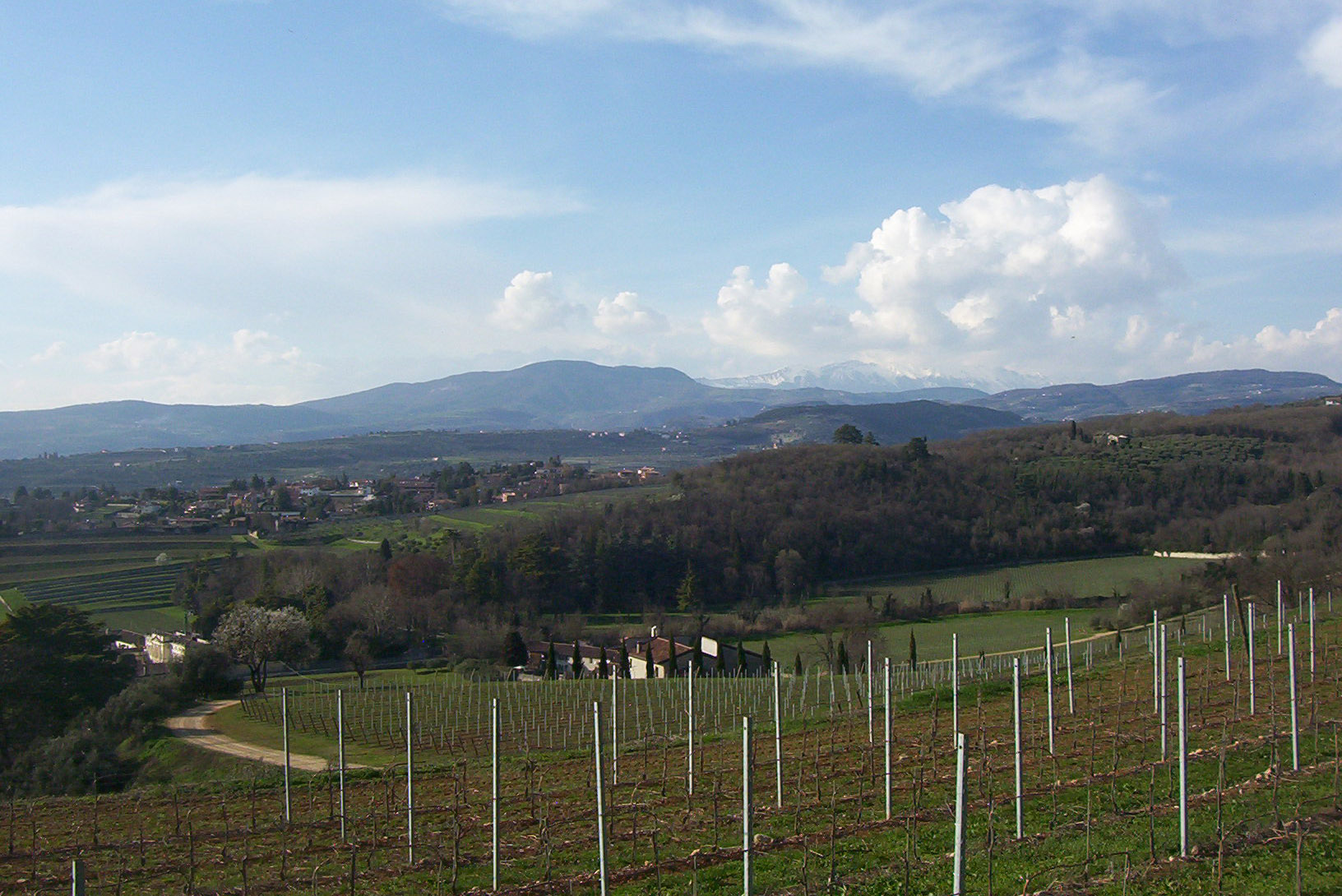
The Valpolicella region where Rossignola is a permitted blending variety in the DOC wines of the area.

In 2000 there were 341 hectares (843 acres) of Rossignola planted in Italy, most of it in the Lake Garda and Valpolicella area in the Veneto. There is also significant plantings of the grape in the province of Vicenza. The variety is permitted as a minor blending component in a number of DOC regions including Bardolino, Valpolicella, Breganze, Garda Orientale and the multi-regional Valdadige DOC that extends into the Trentino-Alto Adige/Südtirol wine region. Here the wine most often contributes acidity to the blends.

== Synonyms ==
Over the years Rossignola has been known under a variety of synonyms including: Gropello, Pulcella, Rossetta, Rossetta del Lago, Rossignola Della Valle, Rossignola Della Valle Pulicella, Rossignola di Montagna, Rossignola Veronese, Rossignuola, Rossola and Rusciola.
