= Rondinella =

Variety of grape

- Grape (Vitis)
- Color of berry skin: Black
- Species: Vitis vinifera
- Origin: Veneto region of Italy
- Notable regions: Valpolicella, Bardolino
- Notable wines: Valpolicella DOC (Rosso and Superiore; includes Classico and Valpantena subzones), Recioto della Valpolicella DOCG, Amarone della Valpolicella DOCG, Valpolicella Ripasso DOC, Bardolino DOC, Bardolino Superiore DOCG
- Ideal soil: Chalky clay
- VIVC number: 10189

Wine characteristics
- General: Unremarkable, high yield, light-bodied

Rondinella is an Italian wine grape variety. Almost all of the total global growing area of 2,481 hectares (6,130 acres) is in the Veneto region of northern Italy, and the grapes are used in wines from the Valpolicella and Bardolino wine regions. Rondinella always appears in these wines blended with Corvina (which DNA evidence has shown to be a parent variety), as a secondary constituent along with Corvinone and Molinara. The grape has rather neutral flavors but is favored by growers due to its prolific yields. The vine is very resistant to grape disease and produces grapes that, while they do not necessarily have high sugar levels, do dry out well for use in the production of Valpolicella straw wine styles such as Recioto and Amarone.
