= Bardolino DOC =

Italian red wine

Bardolino
- Wine region
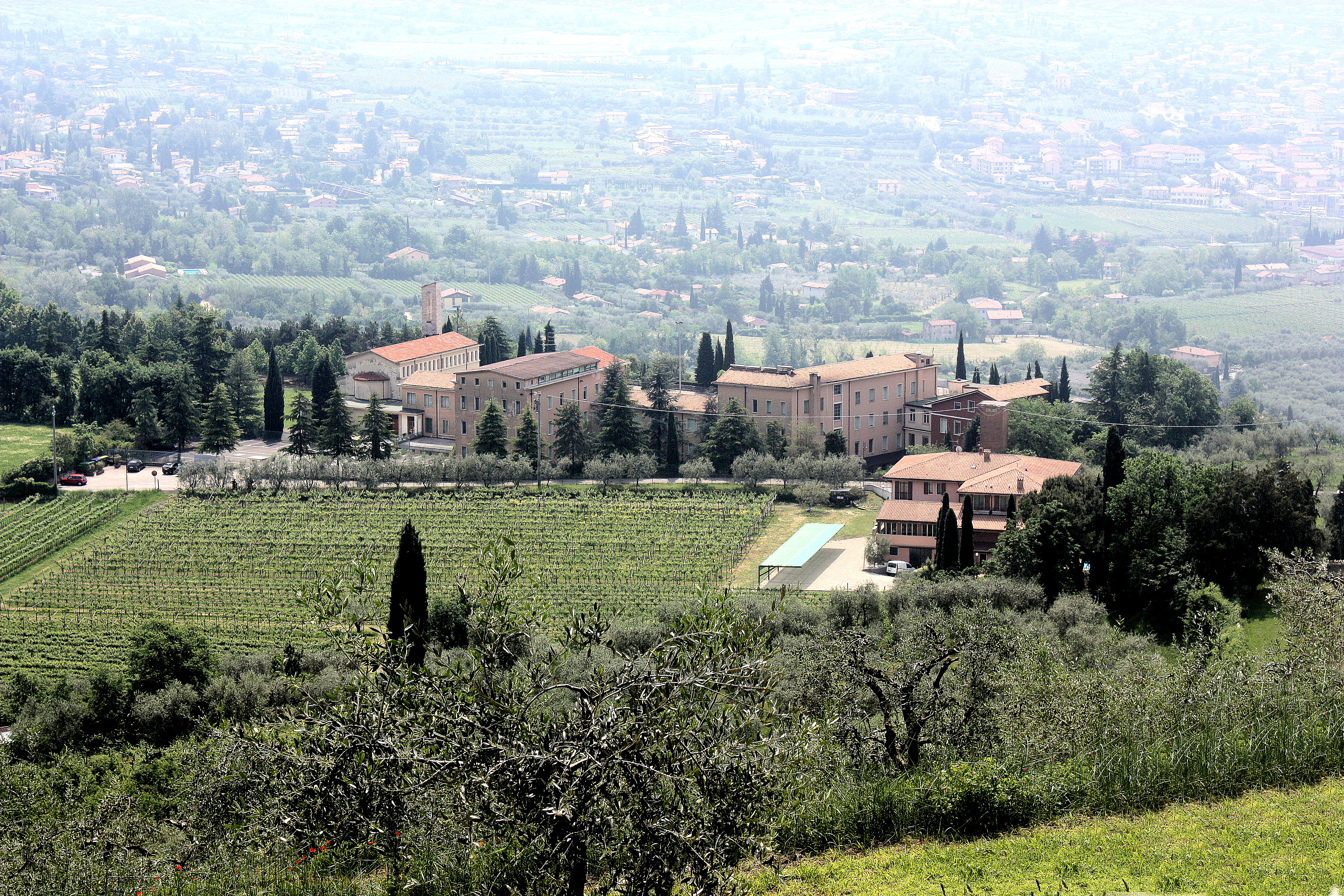
- Bardolino landscape and vineyards, from San Georgio abbey
- Type: Denominazione di origine controllata
- Year established: 1968
- Country: Italy
- Part of: Veneto
- Other regions in Veneto: Valpolicella, Soave, Gambellara
- Sub-regions: Bardolino Classico
- Size of planted vineyards: 2,688 hectares (6,640 acres)
- Grapes produced: Corvina, Rondinella, Molinara
- Wine produced: 228,590 hectolitres (5,028,000 imp gal; 6,039,000 US gal)

Bardolino and Bardolino Superiore are Italian red wines produced along the chain of morainic hills in the province of Verona to the east of Lake Garda. Bardolino takes its name from the town Bardolino on the shores of Lake Garda and was awarded Denominazione di origine controllata (DOC) status in 1968. The Superiore is a stronger aged wine, and was promoted to Denominazione di origine controllata e garantita (DOCG) status in 2001. The blend of grapes used to produce the wine primarily includes Corvina, Rondinella, and Molinara. Up to 15% of the blend is allowed to include Rossignola, Barbera, Sangiovese, or Garganega, in any combination.

== Wine region ==
Located on the south eastern shores of Lake Garda, the classico zone surrounds the towns of Bardolino, Affi, Cavaion, Costermano, Garda, and Lazise.

Beyond the classico zone to the south are flat, fertile plains where Bardolino wine is produced from high grape yields. About 45% of the production comes from the Bardolino Classico region, but unlike its neighboring Veneto DOCs - Soave and Valpolicella - any terroir driven quality difference seems to be minimal between the wine produced in the classico region and that from the greater DOC zone.

== Grapes and wine ==
Although the three main grapes used to produce Bardolino are also used to produce Valpolicella, the two wines are quite different. This is partly because Bardolino generally contains less Corvina which adds body and structure and more Rondinella which has a relatively neutral flavor profile. Yields in Bardolino also tend to be higher than the 13 tonnes per hectare officially prescribed in DOC regulations. Minor blending grapes, such as Rossignola, Barbera, Sangiovese, and the white grape variety Garganega, are also permitted up to 15% total.

Other versions of Bardolino include a Superiore, which has at least 1 extra percent of alcohol and must be aged at least a year before being released, a rosé, known as Bardolino Chiaretto or Chiaretto di Bardolino, a lightly sparkling frizzante, and a novello. The Bardolino novello was first produced in the late 1980s in a style that mimics the French wine Beaujolais nouveau.
