= Straw wine =

Wine made from dried grapes

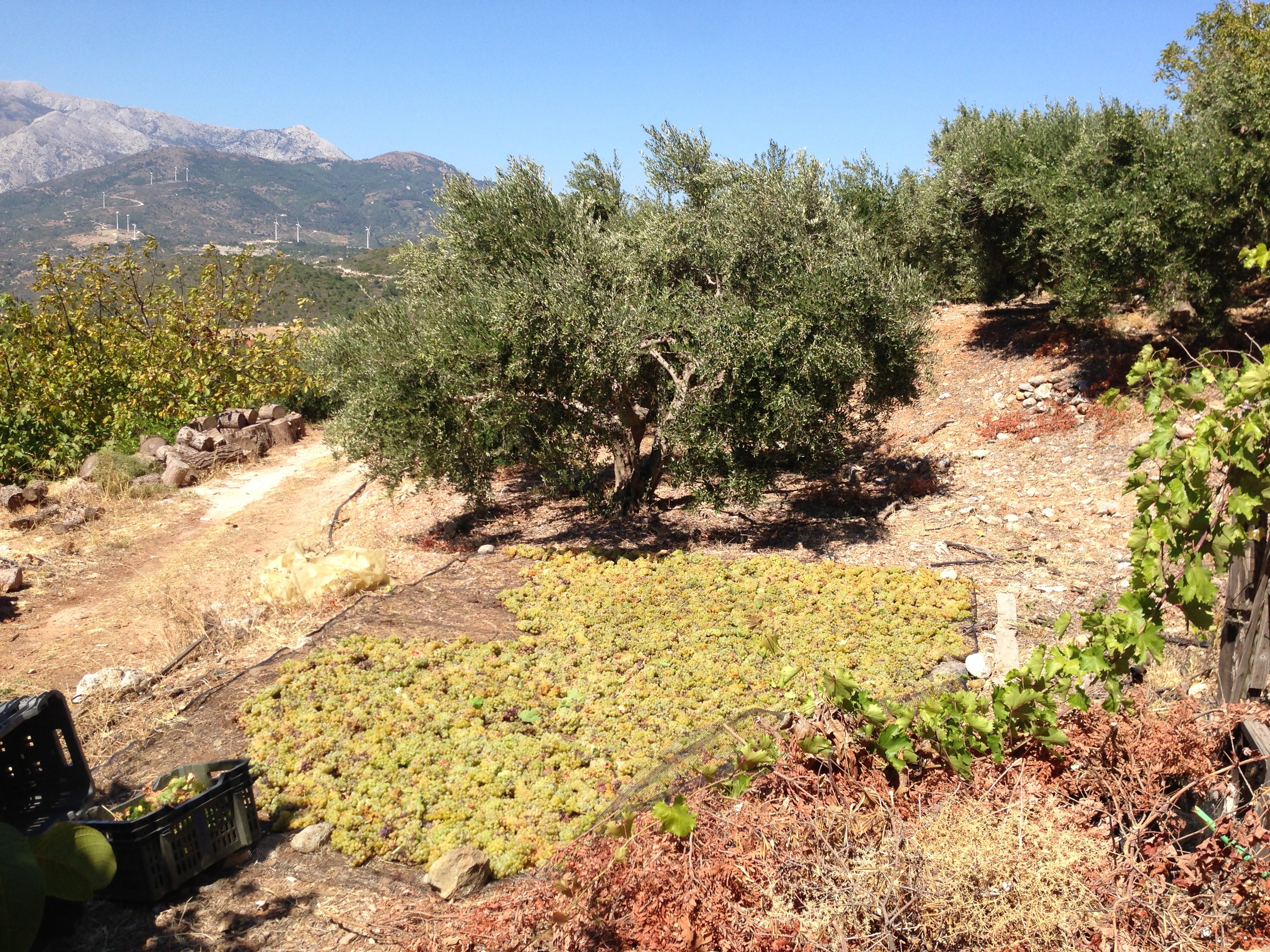
Muscat grapes drying in the sun

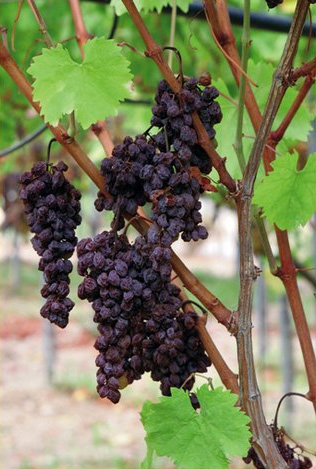
Grapes sun-wilting on the plant

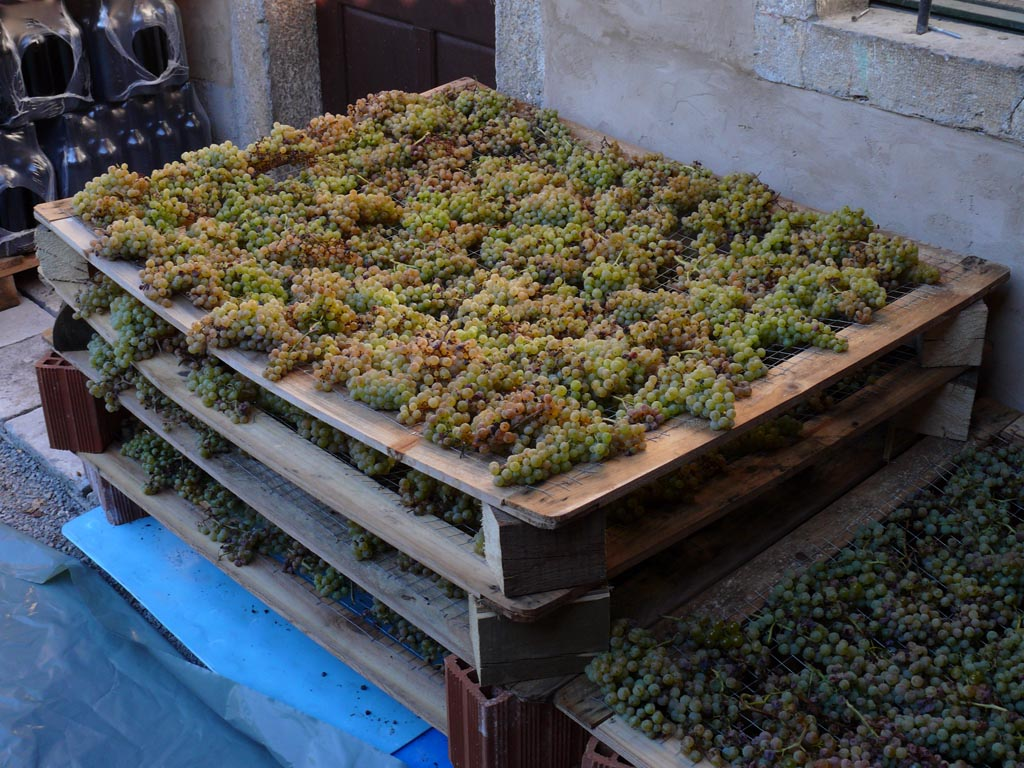
Grapes laid out to dry

Straw wine, or raisin wine, is a wine made from grapes that have been dried off the vine to concentrate their juice. Under the classic method, after a careful hand harvest, selected bunches of ripe grapes will be laid out on mats in full sun (originally the mats were made of straw, but these days the plastic nets used for the olive harvest are likely to be used). This drying will probably be done on well exposed terraces somewhere near the winepress and the drying process will take around a week or longer.

Under less labour intensive versions of the technique, easily portable racks might be used instead of mats or nets, or the grapes are left lying on the ground beneath the grape vines, or even left hanging on the vine with the vine-arm cut or the stem twisted. Technically speaking the grapes must be cut off from the vine in order for the wine to be a 'straw wine'. If the grapes are just left to over-ripen before being harvested, even if this is to the point of raisining, this is a late harvest wine.

The exact technique used varies according to local conditions, traditions and increasingly modern innovations. In some regions the grapes are laid first in the sun and later covered or they are covered at night to protect them against the morning dew. In cooler, damper regions, the entire drying process takes place indoors in huts, attics or greenhouses with the bunches lying on racks or hanging up with good air circulation.

Straw wines are typically sweet to very sweet white wines, similar in density and sweetness to Sauternes but potentially sweeter. They are capable of long ageing. The low yields and labour-intensive production method means that they are quite expensive. Around Verona red grapes are dried, and are fermented in two different ways to make a strong dry red wine (Amarone) and a sweet red wine (Recioto della Valpolicella).

== History ==
The technique dates back to pre-Classical times with wines becoming fashionable in Roman times and in late Medieval/Renaissance Europe when wines such as Malmsey ('Malvasia' originally from Greece) and Candia (from Crete) were highly sought after. Traditionally, most production of these wines has been in Greece, the islands of Sicily, Cyprus, Northern Italy and the French Alps. However, producers in other areas now use the method as well.

Excavations in Cyprus on the Neolithic site at Erimi have revealed that sweet wine was made there some 6000 years ago. This is the earliest appearance of sweet wine in the Mediterranean region. A wine grape known as the Cypriot Manna (or Nama). Similar principles were used to make the medieval Cypriot wine Commandaria, which is still produced today.

References to raisin-wine production in ancient Israel appear both on jar fragments from Tel Lachish and in talmudic literature from the early centuries AD.

The process of making raisin wines was described by the Greek poet Hesiod in mainland Greece around 800 BC. Various Mediterranean raisin wines were described in the first century AD by Columella and Pliny the Elder. Pliny uses the Greek term for honey wine for the following raisin wine:

The grapes are left on the vine to dry in the sun ... It is made by drying grapes in the sun, and then placing them for seven days in a closed place upon hurdles, some 2 m (7 ft) from the ground, care being taken to protect them at night from the dews: on the eighth day they are trodden out: this method, it is said, produces a liquor of exquisite bouquet and flavour. The liquor known as melitites is also one of the sweet wines.

Columella discusses the Passum wine made in ancient Carthage. The modern Italian name for this wine, passito, echoes this ancient word, as does the French word used to describe the process of producing straw wines, passerillage. Perhaps the closest thing to passum is Moscato Passito di Pantelleria from Zibibbo, a variety of the ancient muscat grape, produced on Pantelleria, an island in the Strait of Sicily 80 km (50 mi) from Tunisia) opposite to where Carthage used to be.

== Australia ==
Barossa Valley producer, Turkey Flat Vineyards has been experimenting with this style since 2002 with their 100% Marsanne named 'The Last Straw'. Air-dried on racks for approximately six weeks it is fermented in new oak and then bottle post-fermentation to retain freshness. Residual sugar sits at a comparatively low 59g/L.

== Austria/Germany ==
Strohwein or Schilfwein is an Austrian wine term in the Prädikatswein category which designates a straw wine, a sweet dessert wine made from raisin-like dried grapes. Stroh is German for straw, while Schilf means reed.

The minimum must weight requirements for Strohwein or Schilfwein is 25 degrees KMW, the same as for Austrian Beerenauslese, and these regulations are part of the Austrian wine law. The grapes are furthermore required to be dried for a minimum of three months, either by laying the grape bunches on mats of straw or reed, or by hanging the bunches up for drying by suspending them from pieces of string. However, if the grapes have reached a must weight of at least 30 ºKMW (same must weight as a Trockenbeerenauslese) after a minimum of two months, the grapes are allowed to be pressed at this earlier time.

Strohwein and Schilfwein are treated as synonyms by the wine law, and the choice between them therefore depends on local naming tradition rather than the specific material used for the drying mats for a specific batch of wine.

The Strohwein Prädikat exists only in Austria, not in Germany.

== Croatia ==
The raisin wine most commonly seen in Croatia is Prošek which is traditionally from the southern area of Dalmatia. It is made using dried wine grapes in the passito method. There are only a few commercial producers as it is typically homemade.

== Czech Republic ==
Slámové víno is the Czech term for straw wine that, under Czech wine law, is classified as a Predicate wine (Czech: Jakostní víno s přívlastkem). Czech regulations require the harvested grapes to come from a single wine sub-region, the grapes must be dried for at least three months either on straw or reed mats or hung in a well-ventilated space, and the must weight is required to reach at least 27° NM on the Normalizovaný moštomer scale. Straw wine in the Czech Republic is typically made from white grapes that are well-ripened and undamaged.

== France ==
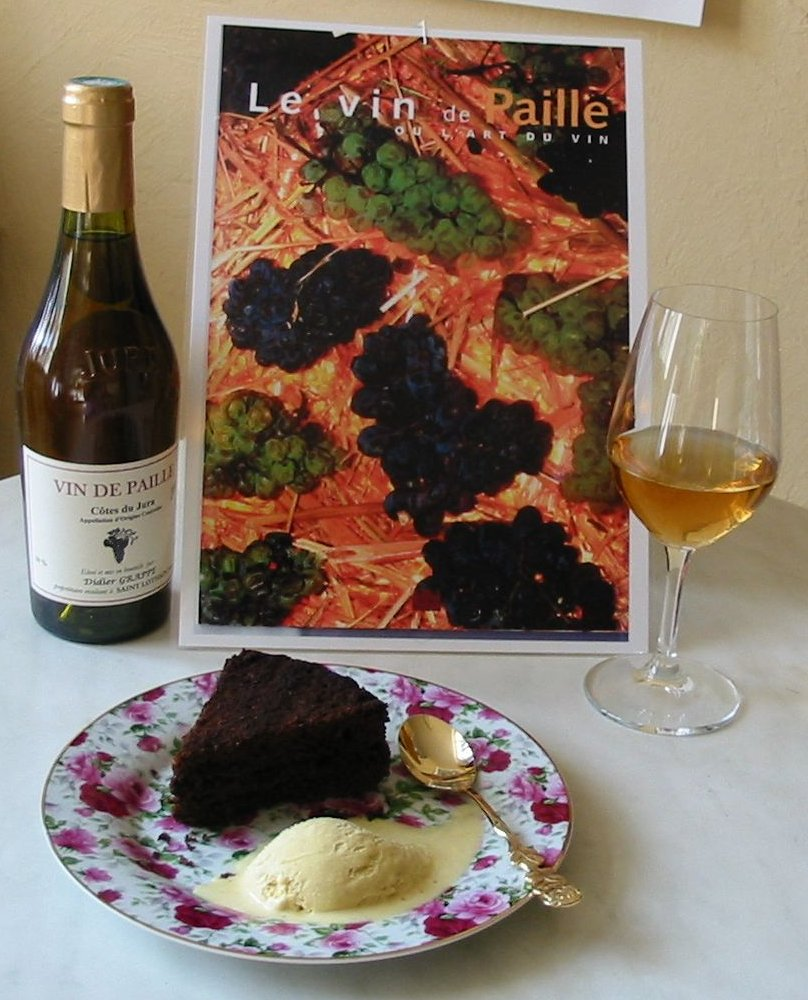
Vin de Paille

Vin de Paille is the French for 'straw wine', made only in the ripest vintages. It is sometimes referred to as the gold of the Jura. Perhaps the best known example is made in the Côtes du Jura (Arbois and sometimes L'Étoile) from a blend of Chardonnay, Savagnin and the red grape Poulsard. Vins de paille are also made from Marsanne in Hermitage, and from Riesling in Alsace. In Corrèze, it is called Vin paillé. Traditionally the grapes are placed indoors on straw mats for up to three months, and the final wine has 10-20% residual sugar. It is drunk alone to start a meal or late in the meal as an accompaniment to ripe French cheese, such as Époisses. Like Sauternes, Vin de Paille is most widely appreciated as an excellent accompaniment to foie gras.

== Greece/Cyprus ==
Liastos is Greek for "sun-dried" and is the word used to describe Passito or straw wine. Greece and Cyprus are the original home of the style and quite a few Liastos wines are produced here.

Cyprus Commandaria claims descent from the native Cypriot wine served at the wedding of King Richard the Lionheart, just after he conquered the island, and then produced by the Knights Templar at La Grande Commanderie in Cyprus after they purchased it from him, and hence claims to be oldest named wine still in production. Commandaria is made from two indigenous grapes, the white Xynisteri and the red Mavro, an ancestor of the Négrette grape known as Pinot St-George in the US.

Monemvasia. Monemvasia-Malvasia is a recreation of the famous Malmsey or Malvasia wine traded by the Venetians and made originally here in the Southeast Peloponnese. The version made by Monemvasia Winery has won many awards recently.

It is worth noting that Monemvasia-Malvasia is not made from any of the various grapes called Malvasia. It is made from a blend of grapes including Kidonitsa, Assyrtiko, Monemvasia and Asproudi. Some of these varieties are, (or are related to) the ancestor varieties of the Malvasia family, as are Aidani and Athiri mentioned below.

Santorini. Vinsanto, the hallmark dessert wine of the island of Santorini, is made of the choicest Assyrtiko grapes, usually blended with small quantities of Aidani and Athiri. These will be pressed and vinified after a few days of sundrying. It is then barrel aged to mature for several years or sometimes much longer. Its capacity for ageing in bottle is measured in decades. Producers include: Argyros, Artemis Karamolegos, Boutari, Gaia, Hadjidakis, Canava Roussos, Santo Wines, Sigalas and Venetsanos Winery.

Samos Some of the famed sweet wines of Samos Island are also made of sundried Muscat Blanc à Petits Grains grapes. The most widely available is Nectar, made by the EOSS cooperative. The small wineries Vakakis and Nopera also make examples. Many growers also make private productions, especially around the village of Platanos.

Liastos wines are also made on the islands of Paros, Evvia, Tinos, Ikaria and Crete.

== Italy ==
In Italy, the generic name for these wines is passito. The method of production is called rasinate (to dry and shrivel). The Moscato Passito di Pantelleria has already been mentioned above. Other famous passiti include Malvasia delle Lipari Passito D.O.C., Vin Santo in Tuscany, Recioto around Verona, the historical (made since Roman times) Caluso Passito made from Erbaluce grapes from the Canavese region in Piedmont and Sciachetrà from the Cinque terre east of Genoa.

=== Tuscany ===
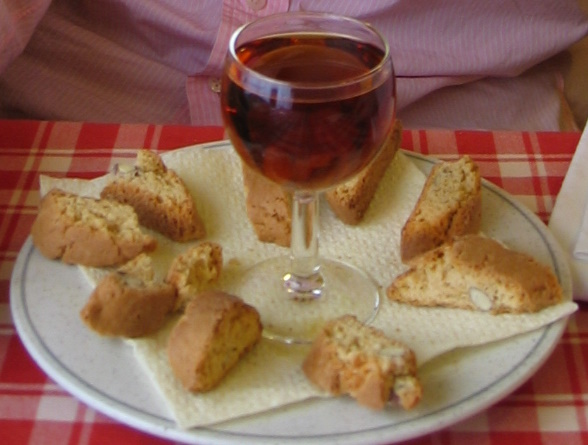
Cantucci e Vin Santo in a restaurant in Milan, Italy

Vin Santo is made in Tuscany from hand-picked grapes that are hung from the rafters to dry. They are fermented in small cigar-shaped barrels called caratelli, and then aged in the caratelli for up to ten years in the roof of the winery. The wine develops a deep golden or amber color, and a sweet, often nutty, taste. Vin Santo is often served as 'Cantucci e Vin Santo', with almond or hazelnut biscuits which are then dipped in the wine.

=== Piedmont ===
Passito di Caluso is a straw wine made from Erbaluce grapes. Firstly, the harvested grapes are left to dry on straw mats for six months. Next, the grapes are softly pressed before being stored in oak barrels for at least four years before being bottled. It is one of the three historical passito wines: Pantelleria, Sciacchetrà and Caluso.

=== Veneto ===
The more famous are the passito wines made from the blend of red wine grapes typical of Valpolicella : 40-70% Corvina, 20-40% Rondinella and 5-25% Molinara. The grapes are dried on traditional straw mats or on racks on the valley slopes. There are two styles of red passito produced in Veneto. If fermentation is complete, the result is Amarone della Valpolicella ("Amarone" - literally "extra bitter", as opposed to sweet). Amarone is a very ripe, raisiny red wine with very little acid, often >15% alcohol (the legal minimum is 14%). Typically Amarone is released five years after the vintage, even though this is not a legal requirement. The pomace left over from pressing off the Amarone is used in the production of ripasso Valpolicellas. Amarone was awarded Denominazione di Origine Controllata status in December 1990 and promoted to Denominazione di Origine Controllata e Garantita status in December 2009. If fermentation is incomplete, the result is a sweet red wine called Recioto della Valpolicella. Fermentation may stop for several reasons including low nutrient levels, high alcohol, and Botrytis metabolites. Grapes dried in the valley bottoms are more prone to noble rot and are favored for Recioto, whereas grapes intended for Amarone are dried on the higher slopes to avoid Botrytis.

Recioto della Valpolicella is regarded as a good companion to chocolate desserts because of the high acidity in cocoa.

Refrontolo passito is a passito red wine produced in a hilly area close to Conegliano in the Treviso province. In a few hectares of this small area in the core of Prosecco, only a few thousand bottles of Refrontolo passito, a Denominazione of Colli di Conegliano DOCG, are produced. This wine is made from Marzemino grapes, it was already appreciated in the past as documented in the opera Don Giovanni of W.A. Mozart, where the protagonist describes it as an excellent wine.

Recioto di Soave is the passito white wine from around Verona, made from the Garganega grape used in Soave. The name comes from the word, recie that in the native Venetian language means 'ears', a reference to this variety's habit of forming two small clusters of extra-ripe grapes sticking out of the top of the main bunch, that were preferred for this wine. It seems to be an ancient wine, in the 5th century AD, Cassiodorus refers to a sweet white wine from Verona that sounds like Recioto di Soave. A classic accompaniment can be the Christmas sweets panettone and Pandoro of Verona.

Torcolato is also passito style white wine from the region. It has a warm golden color and sweet flavor, pleasantly persistent, round and thick; It is an excellent dessert wine, one of the top national wines. It is produced in Breganze, along the Strada (or Wine Road) between the Astico and Brenta rivers, in the strip of land between the city of Bassano del Grappa and the Valdastico valley. The name comes from a word of the Venetian language and means twisted, indeed, in the traditional production method, the clusters were twisted to dried.

Ramandolo passito is a passito wine from the closely Friuli region. Typically produced in the hilly area around Nimis closed to Udine by Verduzzo Friulano grapes, is sweet full-bodied and honey taste. In the same area is produced even the prestigious Picolit, an extremely high quality passito wine. In the Treviso and Venice area are often produced some 'Ramandolo style' wines by the varieties Verduzzo Friulano and Verduzzo Trevigiano A match up that could be recommended is between the Venetian sweet bussolà and Verduzzo passito wines.

== Slovakia ==
Slamové víno is the Slovak term for straw wine that, under Slovak wine law, is classified as a Predicate wine (Slovak: Akostné víno s prívlastkom). Slovak regulations require the wine to be produced from well ripened grapes, stored before processing on straw or reed matting, or hung on strings for at least three months; additionally, the must weight is required to reach at least 27 °NM on the Normalizovaný muštomer scale. Grapes should originate in a single wine sub-region and reach at least 6% of alcohol.

== South Africa ==
De Trafford created the first Vin de Paille to be released under the new appellation "Wine from Naturally Dried Grapes" in 1997. They use 100% Chenin blanc.

== Spain ==
A number of wineries produce straw wine, known in Spanish as vino de pasas, including Bodegas Oliveros and Bodegas Gonzalez Palacios. Most involve a blend of two grapes, the first one usually a Muscat.

Pedro Ximénez grapes are dried in the sun before being vinified, fortified and matured in a solera system like other sherries.

Another straw wine of Spain, produced only by locals of the town of Pedro Bernardo, province of Ávila, Castile and Leon is known as Ligeruelo wine. Grapes of the Uva Ligeruela variety are cultivated in drained, warm, sunny vineyards, and then collected and partially dehydrated over "zardos", or wicker beds constructed to give a light maturation to the grapes, exposed to sun during the first days of fall. These half-dried grapes are then vinified in big clay jars or amphorae (called tinaja), and conserved in clay or crystal recipients.

In Galicia straw wine is known as viño tostado, and is traditionally produced at Ribeiro (DO).

== Dominican Republic ==
Barcelo Winery produces a straw wine known as Caballo Blanco primarily from Alexandrian Muscat.

== United States ==
When commercial wine was banned during Prohibition from 1920 to 1933, homemade raisin wine became a popular substitute. Raisin producers circuitously promoted the practice by issuing warnings against winemaking that were so detailed as to function as winemaking instructions.

Some California wineries are experimenting with the vin de paille style. Tablas Creek Vineyard, in Paso Robles, make one from 100% Roussanne, one from 100% Mourvèdre, and one from a blend of Roussanne, Viognier, Grenache blanc and Marsanne, while cult winery Sine Qua Non makes one from 100% Sémillon. Stony Hill winery, a Chardonnay producer in the Napa Valley, makes a 100% Semillon in the Italian passito style. Qupé, in Santa Barbara County, makes a vin de paille from 100% Marsanne, sourced from the Sawyer Lindquist Vineyard.

Barboursville Vineyards in Virginia produces a straw wine in the Italian passito style, based on Moscato Ottonel and Vidal grapes. Potomac Point Winery, also in Virginia, produces a straw wine based on the Petit Manseng grape. Likewise, King Family Vineyards in Crozet, Virginia produces a 100% Petit Manseng in the vin de paille style, called "Loreley".

In Texas, it was illegal to make wine from dried grapes until 1999, when following pressure from Shawn and Rocko Bruno, who wanted to recreate the raisin wines of their Sicilian heritage, the Alcoholic Beverage Code was amended.

Ravines Wine Cellars in the Finger Lakes produces a vin de paille from Chardonnay grapes. The cool climate of the Finger Lakes gives the grapes a good acidity like the Jura region of France.

Silver Springs Winery in the Finger Lakes produces a vin de paille from 100% Cayuga White and 100% Pinot Grigio.

== Denmark ==
A Danish winery, Vester Ulslev Vingaard, has made wine from dried grapes since 2007. The varieties used are Léon Millot and Cabernet Cantor. The grapes are dried for 4–5 weeks using forced ventilation. During that time the grapes lose up to 50% of their weight, the remaining juice being similarly more concentrated. The wines produced are red, dry wines with a level of alcohol of more than 15%. Vester Ulslev Vingaard sees the use of dried grapes as a means to make more powerful wines in a cool climate and also as a means to redress deficits in concentration and sugars in bad seasons. In 2010 a double-fermented (ripasso-method) wine was also produced using the pomace of the first wine.

== See also ==
- Sweetness of wine
