= Molinara =

- Comune
- Comune di Molinara
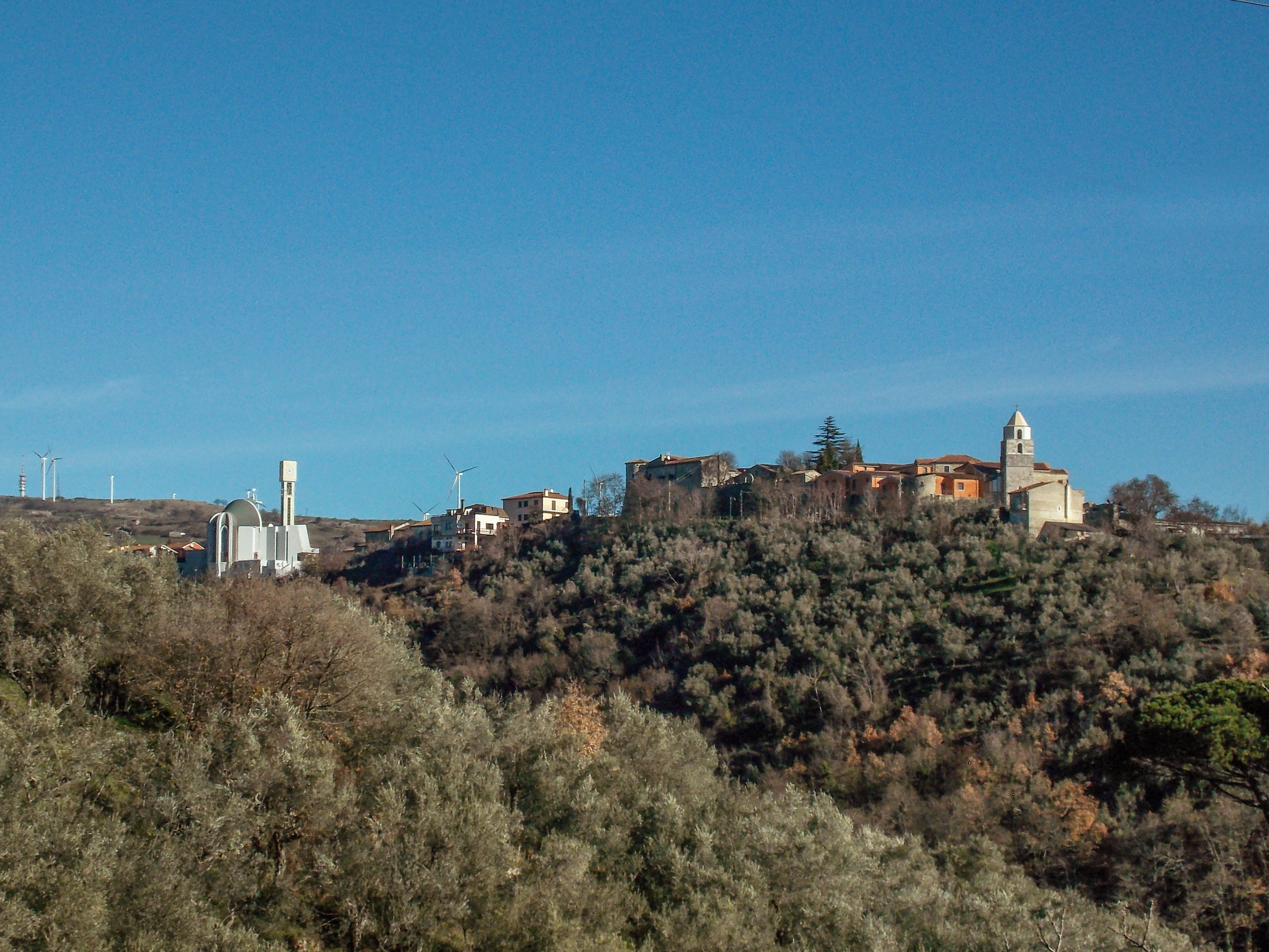

- Location within Italy Location within Campania
- Coordinates: 41°18′N 14°55′E
- Country: Italy
- Region: Campania
- Province: Benevento (BN)

Government
  - Mayor: Giuseppe Addabbo

Area
  - Total: 24.1 km^{2} (9.3 sq mi)
- Elevation: 582 m (1,909 ft)

Population (1 January 2020)
  - Total: 1,536
  - Density: 63.7/km^{2} (165/sq mi)
- Demonym: Molinaresi
- Time zone: UTC+1 (CET)
  - Summer (DST): UTC+2 (CEST)
- Postal code: 82020
- Dialing code: 0824
- ISTAT code: 062041
- Patron saint: Saint Roch
- Saint day: 16 August
- Website: Official website

Molinara is a comune (municipality) in the Province of Benevento in the Italian region Campania, located about 80 km (50 mi) northeast of Naples and about 20 km (12 mi) northeast of Benevento.

Molinara borders the following municipalities: Foiano di Val Fortore, San Giorgio La Molara, San Marco dei Cavoti.
