= Yield (wine) =

Amount of grapes or wine that is produced per unit surface of vineyard

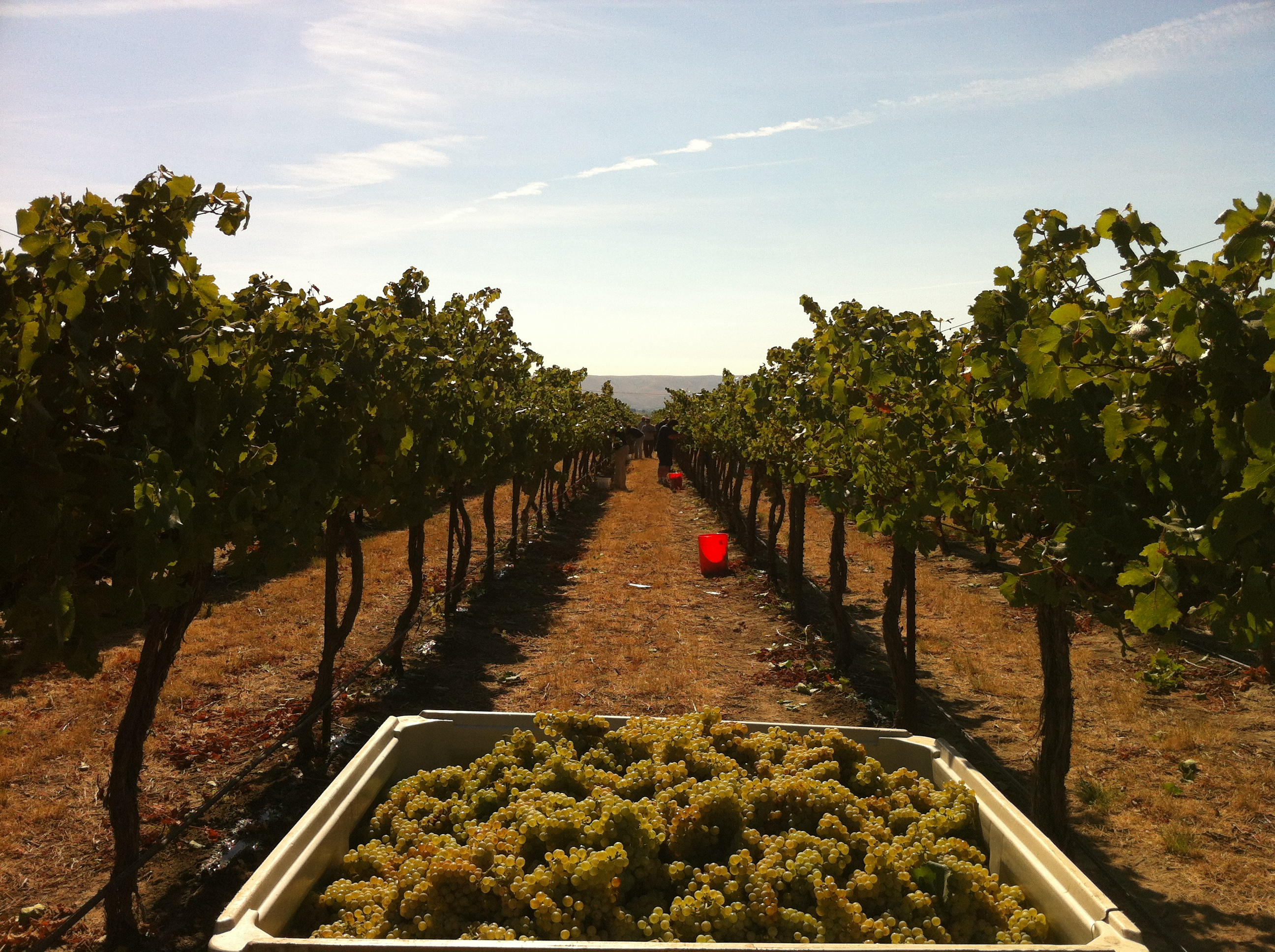
The yield of grapes that will be harvested from a vineyard will depend on several factors including vintage conditions, local wine laws and winemaker's preference.

In viticulture, the yield is a measure of the amount of grapes or wine that is produced per unit surface of vineyard, and is therefore a type of crop yield. Two different types of yield measures are commonly used, mass of grapes per vineyard surface, or volume of wine per vineyard surface.

The yield is often seen as a quality factor, with lower yields associated with wines with more concentrated flavours, and the maximum allowed yield is therefore regulated for many wine appellations.

== Units and conversions ==
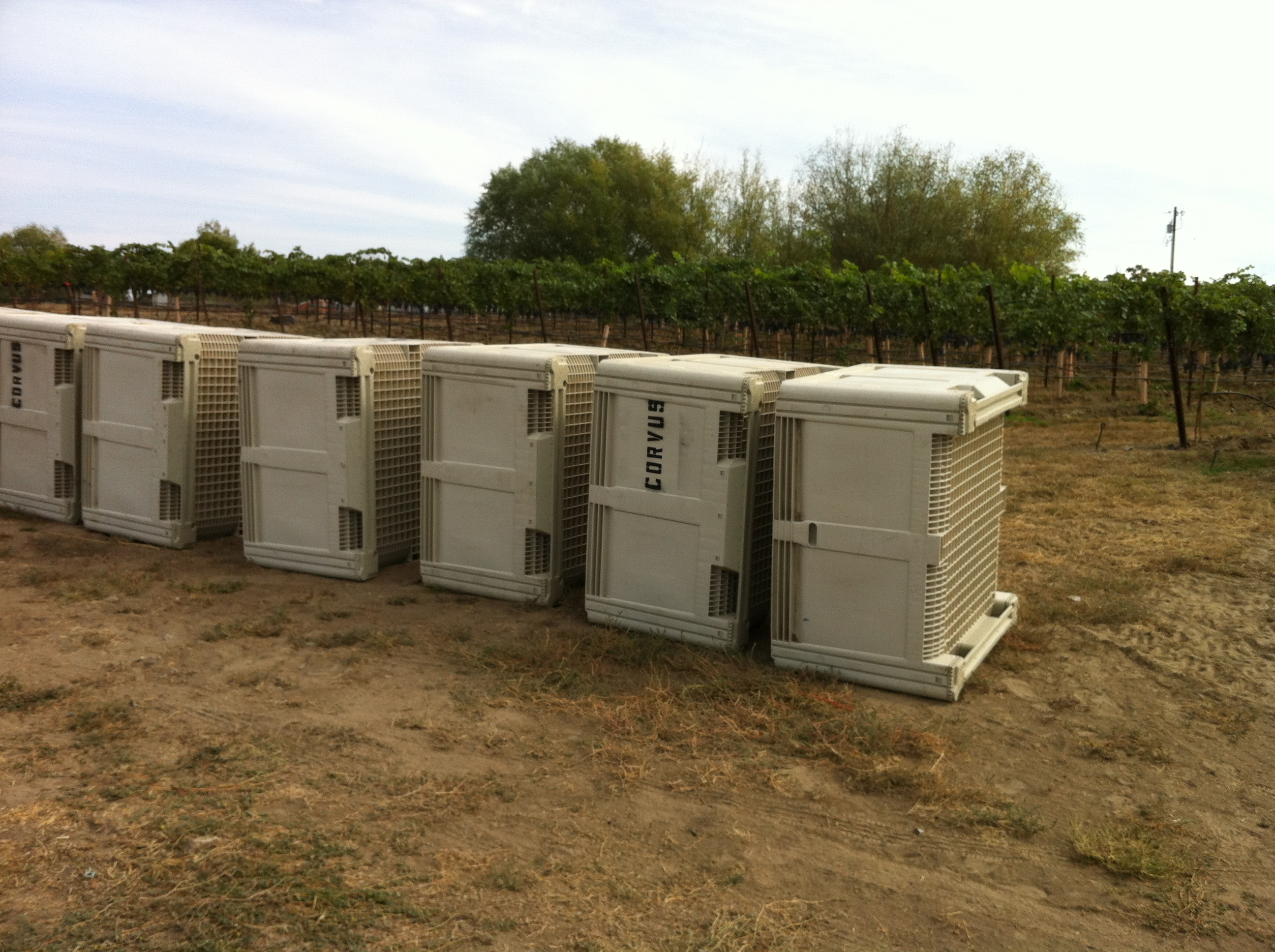
The size of harvest bins can vary from small trays to half tons bins.

In most of Europe, yield is measured in hectoliters per hectare, i.e., by the volume of wine. In most of the New World, yield is measured in tonnes per hectare (or short tons per acre in the USA) – i.e. by mass of grapes produced per unit area.

Due to differing winemaking procedures for different styles of wine, and different properties of different grape varieties, the amount of wine produced from a unit mass of grapes varies. It is therefore not possible to make an exact conversion between these units. Representative figures for the amount of grapes needed for 100 L of wine are 160 kg for white wine, 130 kg for red wine, and 140 kg for a mixture of red and white wine.

Thus:

- for white wine, 100 hl/ha ≈ 16,000 kg/ha (16 t/ha) = 6.5 tons per acre.
  - 1 ton per acre = 2470 kg/ha ≈ 15 hl/ha
- for red wine, 100 hl/ha ≈ 13,000 kg/ha (13 t/ha) = 5.3 tons per acre.
  - 1 ton per acre = 2470 kg/ha ≈ 19 hl/ha
- for mixed wine, 100 hl/ha ≈ 14,000 kg/ha (14 t/ha) = 5.7 tons per acre.
  - 1 ton per acre = 2470 kg/ha ≈ 17.5 hl/ha

== Typical yields ==
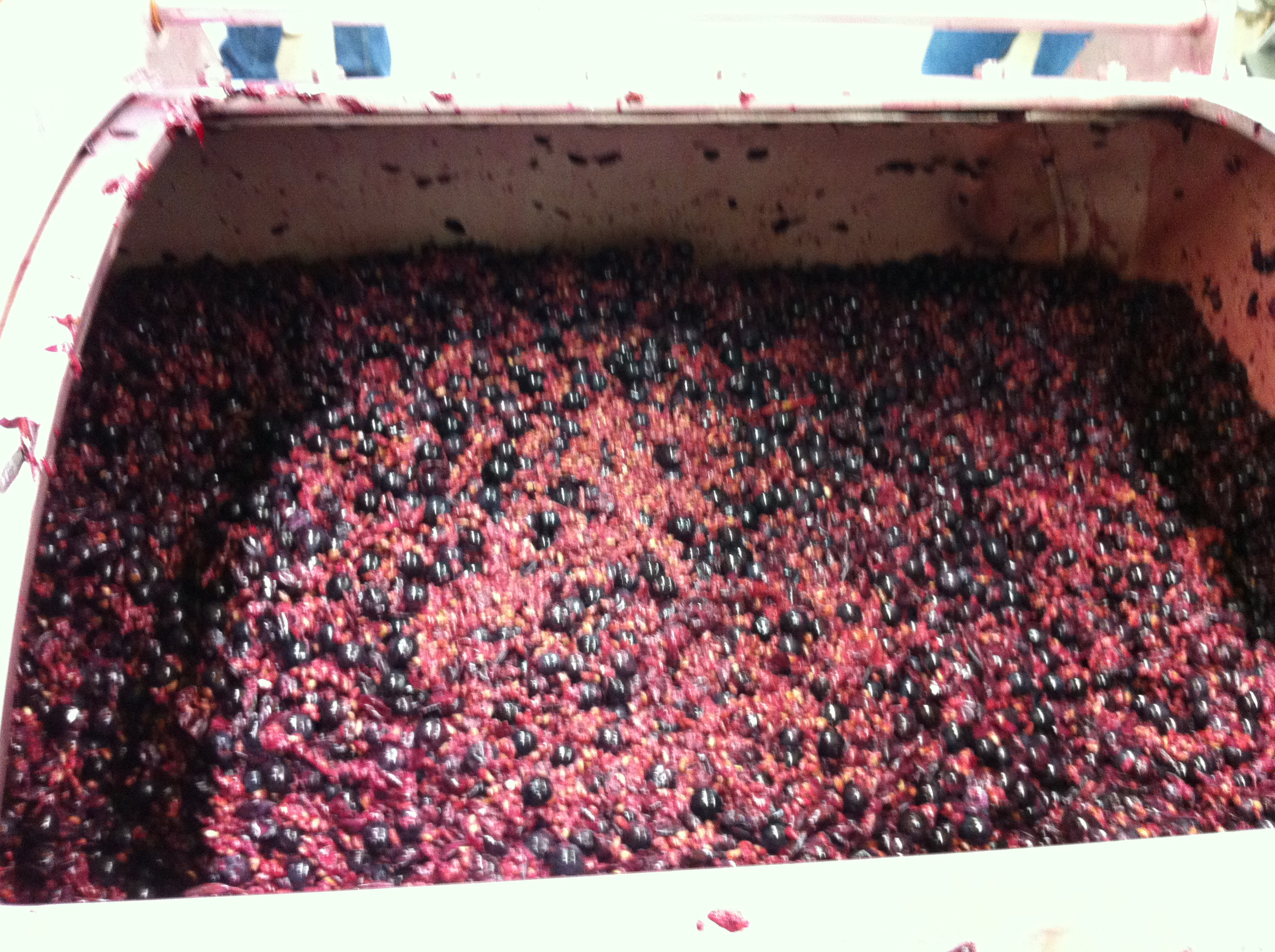
How "hard" a wine is pressed, or if the wine is pressed at all, will impact the finished volume of wine yielded from the grapes. A winemaker can choose to not press their grapes at all, using only the free-run juice liberated during crushing and maceration, reducing the yield volume by 30-40%.

Yields vary greatly between countries, regions and individual vineyards, and can be vintage-dependent. Somewhere around 50 hectoliters per hectare, or 3 tons per acre, is a typical representative figure for many countries and regions.

Yields in selected wine-producing countries in 2007 as national averages
Country	Yield (hl/ha)	Vineyard area (1,000 ha)	Wine production (million hl)
Italy	55	840	45.9
France	52	867	45.4
Spain	30	1169	34.7
United States	49	409	20
Argentina	65	230	15
Germany	103	102	10.5
South Africa	73	135	9.8
Australia	55	174	9.6
Portugal	23	248	5.8
Austria	52	50	2.6

== Yield as an indication of quality ==
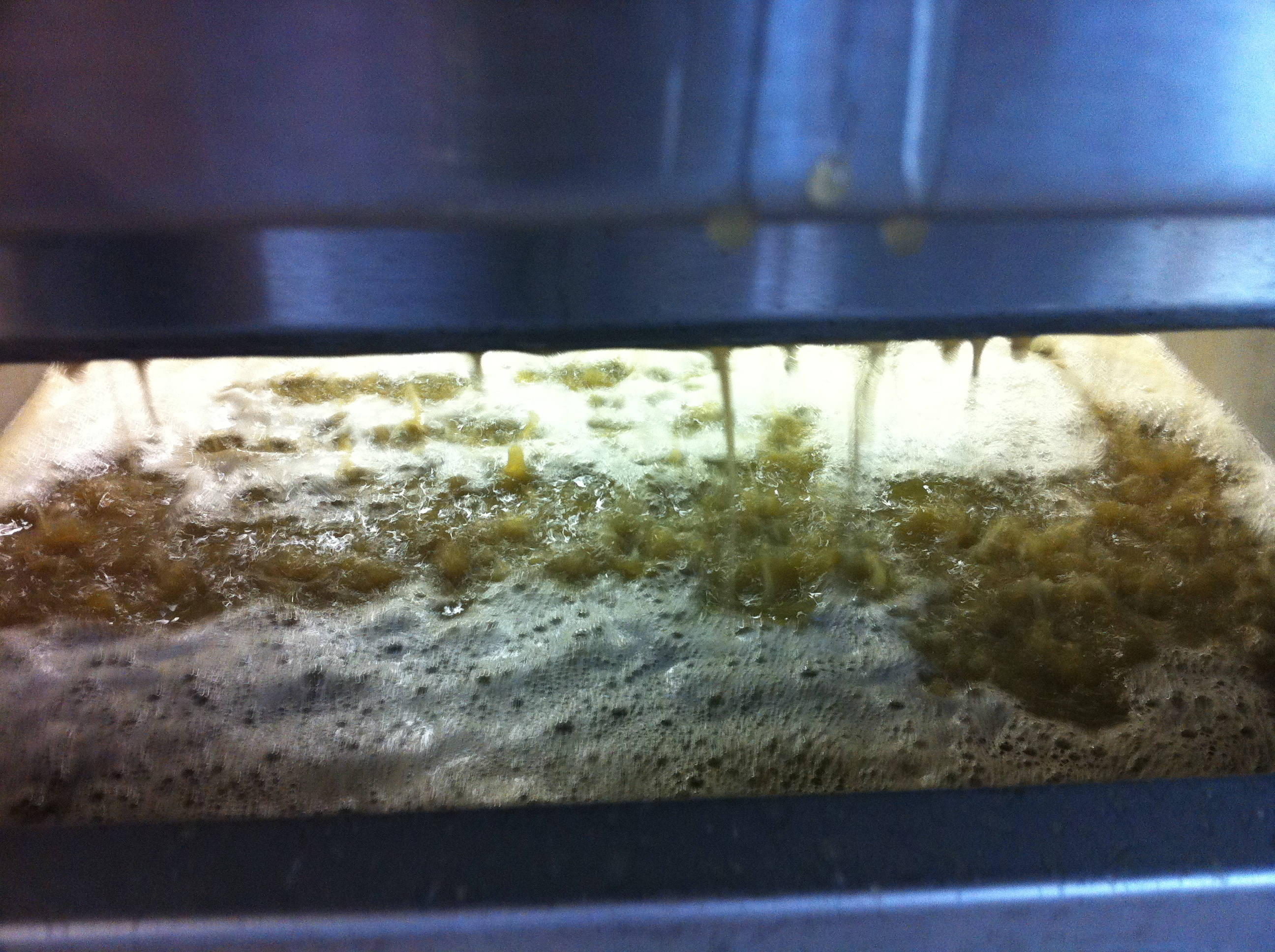
Free run Chardonnay juice dripping into the press pan

While yield is generally seen as an important quality factor in wine production, views differ on the relative importance of low yields to other aspects of vineyard management. In general, there is consensus that if vines are cropped with a very high amount of grape clusters, a poor wine will result because of slow and insufficient ripening of the grapes, due to an unfavorable leaf to fruit ratio. This is a situation that would typically correspond to yields of, say, 200 hl/ha or more, depending on grape variety and many other factors. Beyond that, there are differing schools of thought. One school of thought, generally subscribed to in France, claims that great red wine is impossible to produce at yields exceeding 50 hl/ha. Another school of thought claims that a yield of 100 hl/ha is possible to combine with high quality, provided that careful canopy management is used. In general, white wine is seen as less sensitive to high yields, and some grape varieties, such as Pinot noir, as particularly sensitive to overcropping.

Many examples exist where a vintage-to-vintage variation of yields is in fact positively related with quality, since the low yields can be due to loss of grapes due to adverse conditions such as hail or grey rot. For the Bordeaux vintages of the 1980s, it is generally recognized that the most abundant harvests also gave the best vintages.

== Regulation of yields ==
In both France and Italy, the maximum allowed yields are regulated in wine laws, and vary between appellations.

In France, the maximum yields are given in the regulations for each appellation d'origine contrôlée (AOC). The maximum allowed yield for given AOC in a given vintage is a combination of the base yield of the AOC, as modified by the plafond limité de classement (PLC), which is percentage set for each vintage. In most vintages, the PLC allows a production around 20 per cent above the base yield.
