= Glossary of wine terms =

The glossary of wine terms lists the definitions of many general terms used within the wine industry. For terms specific to viticulture, winemaking, grape varieties, and wine tasting, see the topic specific list in the "See also" section below.

== A ==
Abboccato
An Italian term for full-bodied wines with medium-level sweetness
ABC
Initials for "Anything but Chardonnay" or "Anything but Cabernet". A term conceived by Bonny Doon's Randall Grahm to denote wine drinkers' interest in grape varieties.
Abfüllung (Erzeugerabfüllung)
Bottled by the proprietor. Will be on the label followed by relevant information concerning the bottler.
ABV
Abbreviation of alcohol by volume, generally listed on a wine label.
AC
Abbreviation for "Agricultural Cooperative" on Greek wine labels and for Adega Cooperativa on Portuguese labels.
Acescence
Wine with a sharp, sweet-and-sour tang. The acescence characteristics frequently recalls a vinegary smell.
Adamado
Portuguese term for a medium-sweet wine
Adega
Portuguese wine term for a winery or wine cellar.
Almacenista
Spanish term for a Sherry producer who ferments and matures the wine before selling it to a merchant
Altar wine
The wine used by the Catholic Church in celebrations of the Eucharist.
Alte Reben
German term for old vine
Amabile
Italian term for a medium-sweet wine
AOC
Abbreviation for Appellation d'Origine Contrôlée, (English: Appellation of controlled origin), as specified under French law. The AOC laws specify and delimit the geography from which a particular wine (or other food product) may originate and methods by which it may be made. The regulations are administered by the Institut National des Appellations d'Origine (INAO).
A.P. number
Abbreviation for Amtliche Prüfungsnummer, the official testing number displayed on a German wine label that shows that the wine was tasted and passed government quality control standards.
ATTTB
Abbreviation for the Alcohol and Tobacco Tax and Trade Bureau, a United States government agency that is primarily responsible for the regulation of wines sold and produced in the United States.
Amontillado
Best described as a matured Fino. After the flor dies, the yeast sinks to the bottom of the wine and is no longer able to protect the Sherry from oxidation. The now unprotected Sherry begins to take on a rich and deep nutty flavor.
Anbaugebiet
A German wine region. Anbaugebiete are further divided into Bereiche or districts.
Annata
Italian term for a vintage
Aperitif
A wine that is either drunk by itself (i.e. without food) or before a meal in order to stimulate the appetite.
Appellation
A geographically delineated wine region.
Aromatic
A wine with very noticeable and distinctive aromas
Ausbruch
Austrian term originally referring to the aszú production method of mixing grapes affected by noble rot with a fermenting base wine. Today a Prädikat in Austria, intermediate between Beerenauslese and Trockenbeerenauslese.
Auslese
German for "select harvest", a Prädikat in Germany and Austria.
Azienda vinicola
Italian term for an estate that makes wine from both its own vineyards and from purchased grapes
Azienda agricola
Italian term for a winery that only produces wine from its own estate vineyards

== B ==
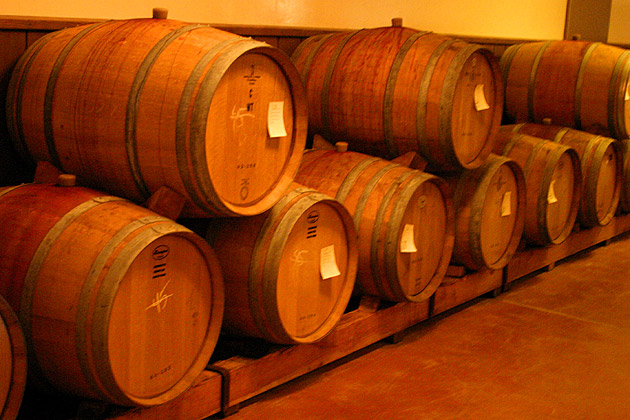
Wine barrels

Balthazar
A large bottle containing 12 litres, the equivalent of 16 regular wine bottles.
Ban de Vendange
The official start of the harvest season in France.
Barrique
The French name for a 225 litre Bordeaux style barrel (Bordeaux hogshead). Will yield 24 cases of 12 bottles each.
Basic
A low-cost entry-level offering from a winery as opposed to its more expensive premium wine offerings.
Beerenauslese
A German term meaning approximately "harvest of selected berries". A Prädikat in Germany and Austria.
Bereich
A district within a German wine region (Anbaugebiet). Contains smaller Grosslagen vineyard designations.
The Berthomeau Report
Commissioned by French Ministry of Agriculture to better position the wine industry for the future.
Bianco, Blanc, Blanco, Branco
Italian/French/Spanish/Portuguese terms for a white wine or grape
Bin
A term originally meant to denote a location in a cellar where wine is stored but now often seen in brand marketing of some wines (e.g. Bin 75 Merlot)
Biodynamic wine
Like biodynamic agriculture in general, biodynamic grape-growing stems from the ideas and suggestions of Rudolf Steiner (1861.1925), which predate most of the organic movement. The principles and practices of biodynamics are based on his spiritual/practical philosophy which includes understanding the ecological, the energetic, and the spiritual in nature.
Biologique
French term for organic winemaking
Blind tasting
Tasting and evaluating a wine without knowing which it is.
B.O.B.
An acronym for "Buyer's Own Brand" which refers to a private label wine owned by the restaurant or retailer that sells the wine.
Bodega
A Spanish wine cellar. Also refers to a seller of alcoholic beverage.
Bota
A cask of wine used to store Sherry with a capacity between 159 and 172 gallons (600-650 liters)
Botte
The Italian term for a wooden barrel, plural: botti. Usually refers to a botte grande, a large floor-standing wooden vat with a capacity of 1,000–3,000 litres (220–660 imp gal; 260–790 US gal).
Bottle
A container with a neck that is narrower than the body and a "mouth." Modern wine bottles are nearly always made of glass because it is nonporous, strong, and aesthetically pleasing.
Breathing
The interaction between air and wine after a wine has been opened. Breathing may take place while the wine is decanting.
Brut
A label designation for a dry sparkling wine, especially a champagne.

== C ==
C.A.
Abbreviation seen on Spanish wine labels meaning Cooperativa Agrícola or local co-operative.
Cane pruning
Cane pruning is when one or two canes from a vine's previous year's growth are cut back to six to fifteen buds which will be the coming growing season's grape producers.
Cantina
Italian term for winery.
Cantina Sociale
Italian term for a co-operative
Cap Classique
South African wine term for a sparkling wine made according to the traditional method
Capsule
The plastic or foil that covers the cork and part of the neck of a wine bottle.
Carbonic maceration
Whole, uncrushed grapes are fermented in a sealed vat containing a layer of carbon dioxide. This results in fruity, soft and distinct red wines. These wines have little tannin and are immediately drinkable. This is the method used throughout France's Beaujolais region.
Cascina
Italian term for a farmhouse or wine estate
Cask
A wood barrel or storage vessel, often made from oak, that is used in winemaking for fermentation and/or aging
Casta
Portuguese term for a grape variety
Caudalie
Unit of the persistence of the wine's finish in seconds. Derived from the word caudal (tail). A wine can have a caudalie of 8 or more seconds.
Cava
Spanish term for a sparkling wine made according to the traditional method
Cave
See wine cave

Cellar door
The area of the winery where point of sale purchases occur. This can be a tasting room or a separate sales area.
Cépage
French term for grape variety. When it appears on a wine label it will usually refer to the varieties used to make the wine.
Cerasuolo
Italian term for a cherry-pink colored wine
Chacha
Georgian term for grape marc and stalks – in Georgian, chacha also refers to the spirits distilled thereof.

Chai
A wine shed, or other storage place above ground, used for storing casks, common in Bordeaux. Usually different types of wine are kept in separate sheds. The person in charge of vinification and ageing of all wine made at an estate, or the chais of a négociant, is titled a Maître de Chai. The New World counterpart to the chai may be called the barrel hall.

Champagne flute

Champagne flute
A piece of stemware having a long stem with a tall, narrow bowl on top.
Chaptalization
The practice of adding sugar (from sugar beets or sugarcanes) to the grape must prior to fermenting, to compensate for low sugar content/potential alcohol in the grapes.
Château
Generally a winery in Bordeaux, although the term is sometimes used for wineries in other parts of the world, such as the Barossa Valley.
Château Cardboard
New Zealand term for inexpensive box wine.
Chiaretto
Italian term for a very pale or light colored rosé
Clairet
A French term for a wine that falls between the range of a light red wine and a dark rosé
Claret
British name for Bordeaux wine. Is also a semi-generic term for a red wine in similar style to that of Bordeaux.
Classic
German classification category for dry wine
Classico
An Italian term for the historical or "classic" center of a wine region — sometimes located in the heart of a DOC.
Cleanskin
In Australia, wine bottled without a commercial label, usually sold cheaply in bulk quantities.
Climat
French term for Lieu-dit used in Burgundy for a single plot of land located within a vineyard that has its own name and demonstrated terroir.
Clos
French term for what was historically a vineyard whose boundaries were delineated by a walled enclosure. Commonly associated with vineyards in the Burgundy wine region such as the Grand Cru vineyard Clos de Vougeot.
Coates Law of Maturity
A principle relating to the aging ability of wine that states that a wine will remain at its peak (or optimal) drinking quality for as long as it took to reach the point of maturity. For example, if a wine is drinking at its peak at 1 year of age, it will continue drinking at its peak for another year.
Colheita
Portuguese term for a harvest
Commercial wine
A mass-produced wine aimed for a wide market of consumers made according to a set formula, year after year. These wines tend to emphasize broad appeal and easy drinkability rather than terroir or craftsmanship.
Commune
A small wine-growing region that surrounds a village
Compte
Classification system used in the Armagnac and Cognac region based on the age of the spirit ranging from 00 for a newly distilled spirit to 2 for a VS ("Very Special"), 4 for a VSOP Reserve, 6 for a Napoleon XO (extra old) and 10 for the longest aged XO.
Congeners
Additional alcohols and aldehydes present in wine apart from ethanol, also known as fusel alcohols.
Consorzio
Italian term for a trade organization of wine producers. Often members of individual consorzio will have their wines packaged with a specific neck label that identifies their membership in the consorzio.
Cooperative
Winemaking organization that is jointly owned by a number of growers who pool their resources and vineyards to produce wine under one label
Cordon training
A method of vine training. Unlike cane pruning where the trunk itself is the only permanent, inflexible piece of the vine, cordon trained vines have one or two woody arms extending from the top of the trunk. These are then spur pruned.

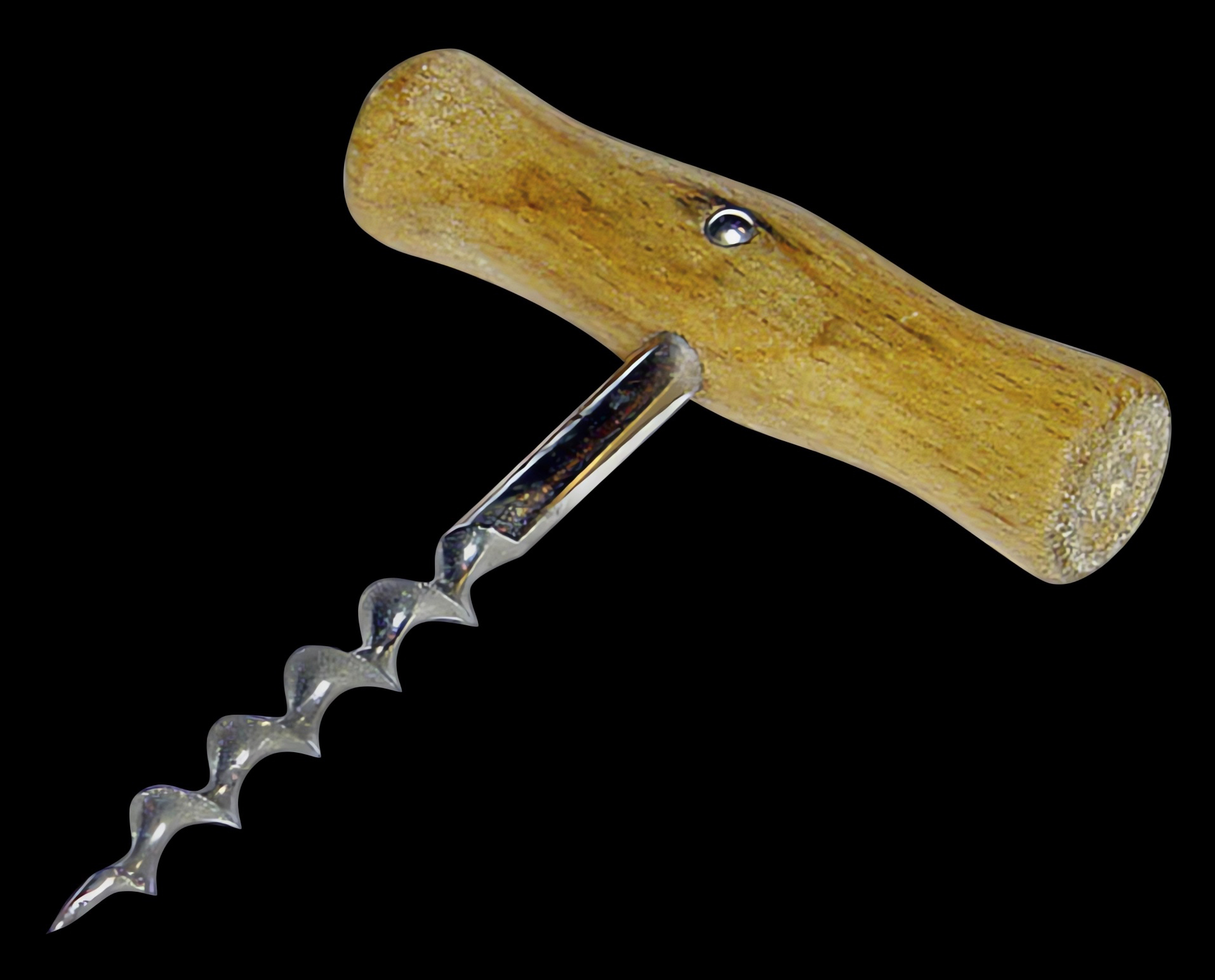
A basic corkscrew

Corkscrew
A tool, comprising a pointed metallic helix attached to a handle, for drawing Corks from bottles.
Côtes
French term for the hillside or slopes of one contiguous hill region.
Coteaux
French term for the hillside or slopes of a hill region that is not contiguous.
Country wine
A quality level intermediate between table wine and quality wine, which in France is known as vin de pays and in Italy as Indicazione Geografica Tipica (IGT) . Also a synonym for Fruit wine.
Crémant
French sparkling wine not made in Champagne region.
Crianza
Spanish aging designation. For red wines a wine needs to be aged at least 6 months in oak (in Rioja and Ribera del Duero it is 12 months in oak) and a total of 24 months before release. For Spanish whites there is no minimum oak aging but a Crianza designated wines needs to be kept at the winery for at least 18 months after harvest before being released to the market
Cru
A French term that literally means "growth". May refer to a vineyard or a winery.
Cru Artisan
Bordeaux estate classification below that of Cru Bourgeois
Cru Bourgeois
A classification of Bordeaux wine estates in the Medoc that were not part of the originally 1855 Bordeaux classification.
Cru Classé
A French term for an officially classified vineyard or winery.
C.S.
An Italian abbreviation for Cantina Sociale that appears on wine labels denoting that the wine has been made by a local cooperative.
Cult wines
Wines for which committed buyers will pay large sums of money because of their desirability and rarity.
Cuvaison
The French term for the period of time during alcoholic fermentation when the wine is in contact with the solid matter such as skin, pips, stalks, in order to extract colour, flavour and tannin. See also maceration.
Cuvée
French term, meaning vat or tank. On wine labels it is used to denote wine of a specific blend or batch.
Cuverie
French term, along with cuvier that refers to the building or room where fermentation takes place. Essentially, the room, building, grange, barn, garage or shed, or other building, used for "making wine." When the grapes are first picked, they arrive at the cuverie.
C.V.
Abbreviation for the French term Coopérative de Vignerons that may appear on wine labels to denote that the wine has been made by a local cooperative.

== D ==
Débourbage
Refers to a process in which the must of a white wine is allowed to settle before racking off the wine, this process reduces the need for filtration or fining.
Decantation
The process of pouring wine from its bottle into a decanter to separate the sediment from the wine.
Dégorgement tardive
French term for a Champagne that has been aged sur lie for an exceptionally long time (far beyond the usually 5-10 years of vintage Champagne) before going through degorgement.
Demi-sec
A medium-dry sparkling wine. In Champagne, this a wine that has received a dosage of 32-50 grams/liter
Dessert wine
Varies by region. In the UK, a very sweet, low alcohol wine. In the US by law, any wine containing over 14.1% alcohol.
DO
1. The abbreviation for Denominación de Origen, or "place name". This is Spain's designation for wines whose name, origin of grapes, grape varieties and other important factors are regulated by law.
2. The abbreviation for dissolved oxygen, the degree of oxygen saturation in a wine, which strongly affects oxidation of the wine and its ageing properties.
DOC
The abbreviation for Denominazione di Origine Controllata, or "controlled place name." This is Italy's designation for wine whose name, origin of grapes, grape varieties and other important factors are regulated by law. It is also the abbreviation for Portugal's highest wine category, which has the same meaning in that country.
Doce/Dolce/Doux/Dulce
Portuguese, Italian, French and Spanish terms for a sweet wine
DOCG
The abbreviation for Denominazione di Origine Controllata e Garantita, or controlled and guaranteed place name, which is the category for the highest-ranking wine in Italy.

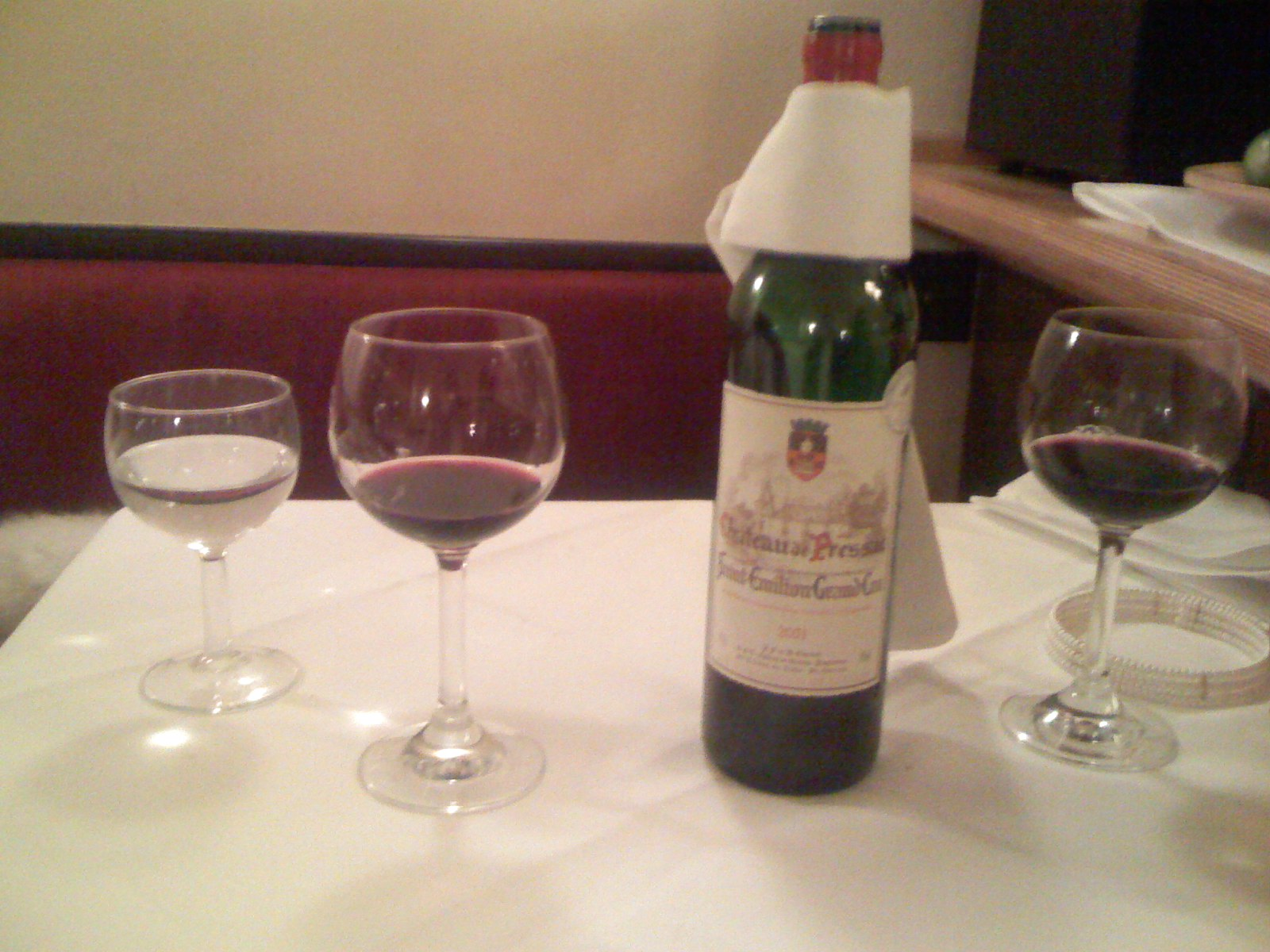
Wine bottle with drip cloth around it

Drip cloth
A cover that slips over the neck of a wine bottle and absorbs any drips that may run down the bottle after pouring, preventing stains to table cloths, counter tops or other surfaces.
Dry
Lacking sweetness in taste.

== E ==
Eau de vie
French term for a grape-derived spirit such as brandy up to a maximum of 96% ABV. Its literal translation is "water of life"
Edelfäule
German term for noble rot
Edelkeur
South African term for noble rot.
Edes
Hungarian term for a sweet wine
Égrappage
The French term for destemming. Destemming is removing stems prior to pressing and fermenting the grapes and their juice. Stems have a significant amount of coarse and often green tannin undesirable in the finished wine.
Einzellage
The smallest geographical unit in German wine law representing a single vineyard.
Eiswein
German for ice wine, a dessert wine made from frozen grapes.
Elaborado por
Spanish wine label term meaning "produced by"
Élevé en fûts de chêne
French phrase that may appear on wine labels to denote that the wine has been aged in oak barrels.
Embotellado por
Spanish wine label term meaning "bottled by"
Élevage
French term for the historical role that négociants play in the winemaking process-roughly translating as "bringing up" or "raising" the wine. Traditionally négociants would buy ready made wines after fermentation, blend and then store the wine before bringing them to the market.
En primeur
A system commonly associated with Bordeaux wine where the previous year's harvest is available for contract sales several months before the wine will be bottled and release.
Encépagement
French term for the proportion of grape varieties used in a blend.
Entry-level wine
The wine from a producer's portfolio that is the lowest cost for purchase and offers the most basic quality.
Eraflage
The process of removing the grapes from the stems, done either by hand or machine. Known in English as destemming.
Erste Lage
German vineyards that have been classified by the Verband Deutscher Prädikatsweingüter (VDP) to be a "first class" location capable of producing Erstes Gewächs and Großes Gewächs wines
Erstes Gewächs
A dry wine from a "great growth" vineyard that has been designated as Erste Lage. In many regions this term has been replaced by Grosses Gewächs.
Erzeugerabfüllung
German term for an estate-bottled wine
Extra-Brut
A very dry sparkling wine. In Champagne, this is a wine that has received a dosage with between 0-6 grams/liter sugar
Extra Dry
A sparkling wine that is sweeter than a brut. In Champagne, this is a wine that has received a dosage between 12 and 17 g/L sugar
Estate winery
A United States winery license allowing farms to produce and sell wine on-site, sometimes known as a farm winery.
EU lot number
A European Union directive initiated in 1992 that mandates every bottle of wine produced or sold in the European Union to include a designated lot number. This allows identified defective or fraudulent wine to be tracked and removed from circulation more efficiently.
Ex-cellars
Refers to the extra cost associated with buying wines en primeur that may include the cost of shipping to the importer's cellars as well applicable duties and taxes.

== F ==
Farm winery
A United States & South Africa winery license allowing farms to produce and sell wine on-site.
Fattoria
Italian term for a wine estate
Federspiel
In the Austrian wine region Wachau, a classification of wine with a harvest must weight of at least 17°KMW and a finished alcohol level between 11 and 12.5% with no more than 4 g/L residual sugar. This classification is between the levels of Steinfeder and Smaragd.
Feinherb
An unregulated German wine term for an off-dry (or halbtrocken) wine
Fermentazione naturale
An Italian term for a "naturally sparkling" wine. This usually refers to a wine, such as Asti, that has been bottled before fermentation is completed so that a natural sparkle of CO2 can be achieved in the bottle
Fiasco
The straw-covered flask historically associated with Chianti.
Fighting varietal
A term that originated in California during the mid-1980s to refer to any inexpensive cork-finished varietal wine in a 1.5 liter bottle.

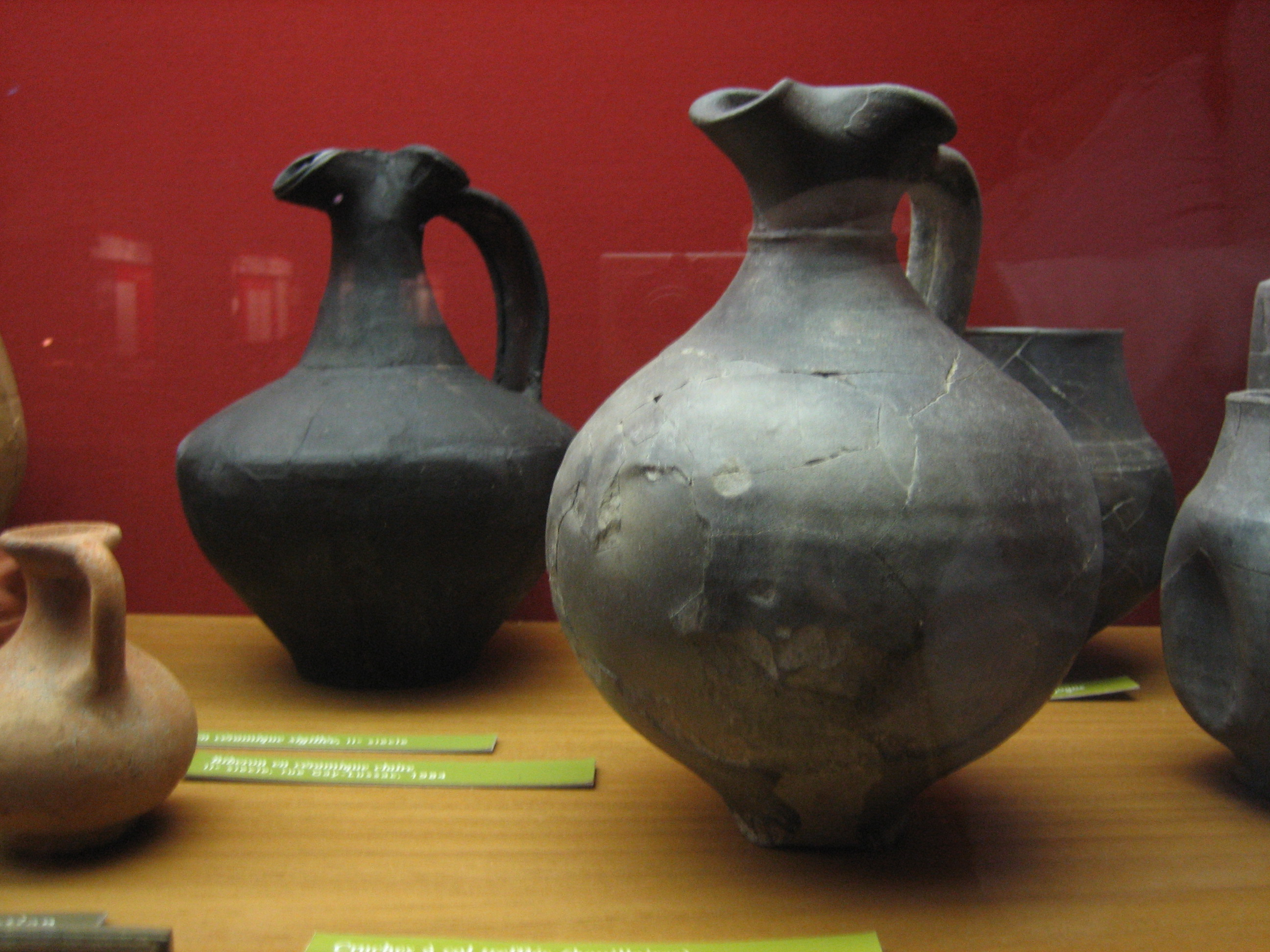
Ancient Roman flagons

Fine wine
The highest category of wine quality, representing only a very small percentage of worldwide production of wine.
Finings
Substances added at or near the completion of wine processing, to remove of organic compounds for the purpose of improving clarity or adjusting flavor or aroma.
Flagon
A glass bottle that holds two litres of (usually inexpensive) table wine.
Flying winemaker
A winemaker who travels extensively across the globe, sharing techniques and technology from one region of the world to another. The term originated with Australian winemakers who would fly to Northern Hemisphere wine regions in Europe and the United States during the August–October harvest time when viticulture in the Southern Hemisphere is relatively quiet.
Fortified wine
Wine to which alcohol has been added, generally to increase the concentration to a high enough level to prevent fermentation.
French Paradox
A 1991 episode of the American news program 60 Minutes that documented the low mortality rate from cardiovascular disease among the French who had a high-alcohol, high-cholesterol and low exercise lifestyle in contrast to the high mortality rate among Americans with a relatively lower cholesterol, low alcohol and more exercise lifestyle.
Frizzante
Italian term for a semi-sparkling wine.
Frizzantino
Italian term for a wine that has very slight effervescence, more than a still wine but less than a semi-sparkling. Similar to the French term perlant.
Fruit wine
A fermented alcoholic beverage made from non-grape fruit juice which may or may not include the addition of sugar or honey. Fruit wines are always called "something" wines (e.g., plum wine), since the word wine alone is often legally defined as a beverage made only from grapes.

== G ==
Garrafeira
Portuguese term for a potentially superior quality wine that has seen extended aging in the barrel and bottle
Gemeind
German term for a commune where wine is produced
Geographical Indication
A term used by the World Trade Organization to designate a wine region that can produce wines with defined characteristics (such as an Appellation d'origine contrôlée (AOC) in France).
Globalization of wine
Refers to the increasingly international nature of the wine industry, including vineyard management practices, winemaking techniques, wine styles, and wine marketing.
Gönc
In Hungary, the traditional oak cask used to age Tokaji
Goon
Australian term for inexpensive box wine.
Grains nobles
A phrase that may appear on French wine labels from Alsace, Condrieu, Coteaux du Layon and Mâcon to indicate a wine made from botrytis-infected grapes
Grande Marque
French term for a famous brand of wine, most commonly associated with the large Champagne houses.
Grand cru
French term for a "Great growth" or vineyard. In Burgundy, the term is regulated to a define list of Grand cru vineyards.
Grand vin
French term most often associated with Bordeaux where it denotes a Chateau's premier wine, or "first wine". On a wine label, the word's Grand vin may appear to help distinguish the wine from an estate's second or third wine.
Gran Reserva
Spanish aging designation that for red wine stipulates that it has been aged for a total of 5 years after harvest with at least 18 months in oak (in Rioja and Ribera del Duero the minimum is 24 months). For Spanish white wines the requirement is 4 years of total aging with at least 6 months in oak (increased to 12 months in Rioja and Ribera del Duero)
Granvas
Spanish term for a sparkling wine that has been tank fermented as opposed to going through secondary fermentation in the bottle according to the Traditional Method used for Cava production
Grosses Gewächs
A dry wine made from a vineyard that has been designated as an Erste Lage ("Great Growth") by the wine grower association VDP
Grosslage
A German designation for a cluster of vineyards within a Bereich as opposed to an Einzellage which is a single vineyard.
GSM
A blend of the three grape varieties Grenache, Shiraz (also known as Syrah), and Mourvèdre. Prevalent in Rhône wine and Australian wine

== H ==
Habillage
French term for the foil and wire cork cage that are used to dress a bottle of sparkling wine
Halbtrocken
German term for a medium-dry wine
Hock
Term for Rhine wines, usually used in England.
Horizontal wine tasting
A tasting of a group of wines from the same vintage or representing the same style of wine (such as all Pinot noirs from different wineries in a region), as opposed to a vertical tasting which involves of the same wine through different vintages. In a horizontal tasting, keeping wine variety or type and wine region the same helps emphasize differences in winery styles.

== I ==
Ice wine
Wine made from frozen grapes. Written, and trademarked as a single word - Icewine - in Canada. Called Eiswein in German.
Imbottigliato all'origine
Italian term for a wine that has been estate-bottled
Imperial
A large bottle holding six litres, the equivalent of eight regular wine bottles.
IGT
Abbreviation for "Indicazione Geografica Tipica", the lowest-ranking of the three categories of Italian wine regulated by Italian law.
International variety
Grape varieties grown in nearly every major wine region, for example Cabernet Sauvignon, Chardonnay and Merlot
Invecchiato
Italian term for a wine that has been aged either in oak or in the bottle

== J ==
Jeroboam
A large bottle holding 3-5 litres, the equivalent of 4-6 regular wine bottles.
Jug wine
American term for inexpensive table wine (French: Vin de table).

== K ==
Kabinett
A wine designation in Germany (where it is a Prädikat) and Austria.
Kick
An alternative name for a Punt. The indentation found in the base of a wine bottle.
Kosher wine
Wine that is produced under the supervision of a rabbi so as to be ritually pure or clean.

== L ==
Landwein
German term for a wine slightly above table wines (tafelwine). Similar to a French vin de pays wine.
Late harvest wine
Also known as late picked, wine made from grapes that have been left on the vine longer than usual. Usually an indicator for a very sweet or dessert wine.
Lazy Ballerina
One example of a trellising system used to grow wine grapes.
Lie
French term for the dead yeast and sediment of wine also known as lees.
Litre (US - Liter)
A metric measure of volume equal to 33.8 fluid ounces (U.S.) or 35.2 fl oz (imperial).
Lieu-dit
French term for a named vineyard site. Usually used in the context of describing individual vineyards below Grand cru status.
Liquoreux
French term meaning "liqueur-like" used for dessert wine with a luscious, almost unctuous quality. Often used to describe wines made by botrytis-infected grapes
Liquoroso
Italian term for a fortified wine

== M ==
Maderized
A wine that has been oxidatively aged by maderisation. Often associated with the wines of Madeira
Magnum
A bottle holding 1.5 litres, the equivalent of two regular wine bottles.
Manipulant
French term for a grape grower who makes their own wine. Often associated with the Champagne wine region where producers of Grower Champagnes are identified by the initials RM (for Récoltant-Manipulant) on wine labels
Marani
General term for winery or wine cellar in the country of Georgia.
Marc
The distillate made from pomace. The term can also refer to the pomace itself or, in the Champagne region, to individual press fractions from the traditional vertical wine press.
Mas
French term for a vineyard
Maso/Masseria
Italian terms for a wine estate
Master of Wine
A qualification (not an academic degree) conferred by The Institute of Masters of Wine, which is located in the United Kingdom.
May wine
A light German wine flavored with sweet woodruff in addition to strawberries or other fruit.
Mead
A wine-like alcoholic beverage made of fermented honey and water rather than grape juice.
Merlot-to-go law
Legislation in some U.S. states allowing restaurant patrons to take the remains of an opened bottle of wine with them.
Meritage
Originally created in California, these blended wines can be summed up as the "American Bordeaux". The term is a blend of the words "merit" and "heritage" and pronounced the same. The Red blend is made from at least 2 of the 5 Bordeaux grape varieties: Cabernet Sauvignon, Merlot, Cabernet Franc, Petit Verdot, and Malbec. The White Meritage is a blend at least 2 of Sauvignon blanc, Sauvignon vert, and Semillon.
Methuselah
A large bottle holding six liters, the equivalent of eight regular wine bottles.
Metodo charmat
Italian term for a sparkling wine that has gone through secondary fermentation in a tank (Charmat method) as opposed to the traditional method of fermentation in the bottle that consumers will eventually purchase.
Metodo classico/Metodo tradizionale
Italian terms for a sparkling wine that has gone through secondary fermentation according to the traditional method
Mid palate
The balance of weight, acidity and fruit flavors that are perceived while the wine is still in the tasters mouth and before swallowing
Millésime
French term for a vintage date that can appear on a wine label
Mis en bouteille au château
French for "bottled at the winery", usually in Bordeaux.
Mistelle/Mistela
French and Spanish terms for a fortified wine made by mixing unfermented grape juice with an alcohol spirit. For example Pineau des Charentes
Moelleux
French term usually used for wines of mid-level sweetness or liquoreux.
Monopole
French term for an appellation, where all the vineyards in the appellation are under single ownership.
Mousse
The sparkling effervescence of a wine. In the glass it perceived as the bubbling but the surface of the glass can affect this perception. Premium quality sparkling wine has a mousse composed of small, persistent string of bubbles.
Mousseux
French term for a sparkling wine
Mulled wine
Wine that is spiced, heated, and served as a punch.
Must
The juice of freshly pressed grapes

== N ==
Nebuchadnezzar
A large bottle holding 15 litres, the equivalent of 20 regular wine bottles.
Négociant
French for "trader". A wine merchant who assembles the produce of smaller growers and winemakers and sells the result under its own name.
New World wine
Wines produced outside of the traditional wine growing areas of Europe and North Africa.
Noble rot
A fungal disease caused by Botrytis cinerea that results in dehydrated and shrivelled grapes that are high in concentrated sugar. Noble Rot grapes are an essential component of many Austrian and German wines.
Non-filtré
French term for a wine that has not been filtered
Nose
The aroma or bouquet of a wine.

== O ==
Oenophile
A wine aficionado or connoisseur.
Oenology
The study of aspects of wine and winemaking.
Old World wine
Wines produced inside of the traditional wine growing areas of Europe and North Africa.
Organoleptic
A winetasting term for anything that affects one of the main senses such as smell. An example would be an affliction of the common cold or being in a room with someone wearing an overwhelming amount of perfume.

== P ==
Pétillant
French term for a lightly sparkling wine
Petit château
A Bordeaux wine estate that doesn't have any official designation of classification.
Piquant
French term for a simple, quaffing white wine with pleasing fruit structure and balance of acidity.
Plafond Limité de Classement
An allowance within the French AOC system that allows producers to exceed the official maximum limit on yields by as much as 20% in warm weather years. Critics such as wine writer Tom Stevenson describes this loophole (also known as "PLC") as "legalized cheating"
Plan Bordeaux
A proposal for enhancing the economic status of the wine industry in Bordeaux.
Plonk
British English slang for an inexpensive bottle of wine. The term is thought to originate from the French word for white wine, "blanc".
Podere
Italian term for a small wine estate
Port
A sweet fortified wine, which is produced from grapes grown and processed in the Douro region of Portugal. This wine is fortified with the addition of distilled grape spirits in order to boost the alcohol content and stop fermentation thus preserving some of the natural grape sugars. Several imitations are made throughout the world.
Pourriture noble
Italian term for noble rot
Prädikat
A PDO wine designation for high quality used in Germany and Austria, based on grape ripeness and must weight. There are several Prädikate ranging from Kabinett (Spätlese in Austria) to Trockenbeerenauslese. The Austrian Prädikat also includes the designation Ausbruch between Beerenauslese and Trockenbeerenauslese.
Prädikatswein
The highest class of wine in the German wine classification, formerly called Qualitätswein mit Prädikat. These wines always display a specific Prädikat on their label.
Premier cru
French term for a "First growth". Used mostly in conjunction with the wines of Burgundy and Champagne where the term is regulated.
Premium wines
Higher quality classification of wine above every day drinking table wines. While premium wines maybe very expensive there is no set price point that distinguishes when a wine becomes a "premium wine." Premium wines generally have more aging potential than every day quaffing wines.
Primary aromas
The aromas in wine derived from the grapes themselves and are considered part of the varietal character or typicity of the grape variety. This is opposed to the secondary aromas which come from the fermentation and maturation process and the tertiary aromas which come from aging process in the bottle.
Produttore
Italian term for a wine producer
Propriétaire
French term for the owner of a wine estate
Protected Designation of Origin/PDO
Wine labeling term introduced to the European Union in 2009 to replace the Quality Wines Produced in Specified Regions (QWPSR) designation. Used to denote a wine from a region with more specification and regulations than a generic Geographic Indication (GI)
Protected Geographical Indication/PGI
Wine labeling term introduced to the European Union in 2009 to replace the "Table Wine" designation. Used to denote a wine with lower specification and regulation than that with a PDO or GI designation.
Punt
The indentation found in the base of a wine bottle. Punt depth is often thought to be related to wine quality, with better quality wines having a deeper punt.
Puttonyos
In Hungary, the measurement of sweetness levels for Tokaji ranging from 3 Puttonyos, which contains at least 60 grams/liter of sugar, to 6 Puttonyos containing at least 150 g/L of sugar.

== Q ==
QbA
German initials for Qualitätswein bestimmter Anbaugebiete.
QmP
German initials for Qualitätswein mit Prädikat.
QPR
Initials for Quality-Price Ratio.
Qualitätswein
A designation of better quality German wines. When used in isolation on a wine label, it refers to Qualitätswein bestimmter Anbaugebiete.
Qualitätswein bestimmter Anbaugebiete (QbA)
A designation of better quality German wines from recognized viticultural areas. It formally represents the second-highest level of German wine.
Qualitätswein mit Prädikat (QmP)
A former designation of the best quality German wines, since 2007 shortened to Prädikatswein.
Quality-Price Ratio (QPR)
A designation for rating wine based on the ratio of its quality and its price. The higher quality and less expensive price a wine has, the better the ratio.
Quality Wines Produced in Specified Regions (QWPSR)
A now-defunct wine classification category in the European Union that was formally abolished, along with the Table Wine designation, in 2009 with the adoption of the Protected Designation of Origin (PDO) system.
Quaffing wine
A simple, everyday drinking wine
Quinta
Portuguese term for a wine estate.
Qvevri (Georgian: ქვევრი)
Earthenware vessels used for the fermentation, storage and ageing of traditional Georgian wine. Resembling large, egg-shaped amphorae without handles, they are either buried below ground or set into the floors of large wine cellars.

== R ==
Raisin
French term for a grape
Recioto
An Italian sweet wine made from passito grapes.
Récoltant
French term for a wine producer who grows their own grapes. Often associated with the Champagne wine region where producers of Grower Champagnes are identified by the initials RM (for Récoltant-Manipulant) on wine labels
Récolt
Redox
The reductive-oxidative way that wine ages. As one part gains oxygen and becomes oxidized, another part loses oxygen and becomes reduced. Early in its life, a wine will exhibit oxidative aromas and traits due to the relatively recent influence and exposure of oxygen when the wine was barrel aged and/or bottled. As the wine ages and is shut off from a supply of oxygen in the bottle, a mature wine will develop reductive characteristics.
Rehoboam
A large bottle holding 4.5 litres, the equivalent of six regular wine bottles.
Reserva
Spanish aging designation. For red wines this means that a wine has been aged for at least 3 years following harvest with at least 12 months in oak. For Spanish white wines, the designation means that the wine has been aged for at least 18 months with at least 6 of those months in oak.
Reserve/Riserva/Reserva
Terms given to wine to indicate that it is of higher quality than usual sometimes with longer aging and higher alcohol levels. Outside of the use of "Reserva" in Spanish wines, these terms usually have no official standings or requirements.
Residual sugar/RS
The unfermented sugar left over in the wine after fermentation. All wines, including those labeled as "dry wines" contain some residual sugars due to the presence of unfermentable sugars in the grape must such as pentoses.
Rich
French term for a very sweet wine. Often used as a description for very sweet sparkling wine
Ripasso
The addition of Amarone flavor to Valpolicella wine by allowing the Valpolicella to pass over the drained must of an Amarone on its way to secondary fermentation.
Rosado/Rosato
Spanish and Italian terms for a rosé wine
Rosso/Rouge
Italian and French terms for a red wine

== S ==
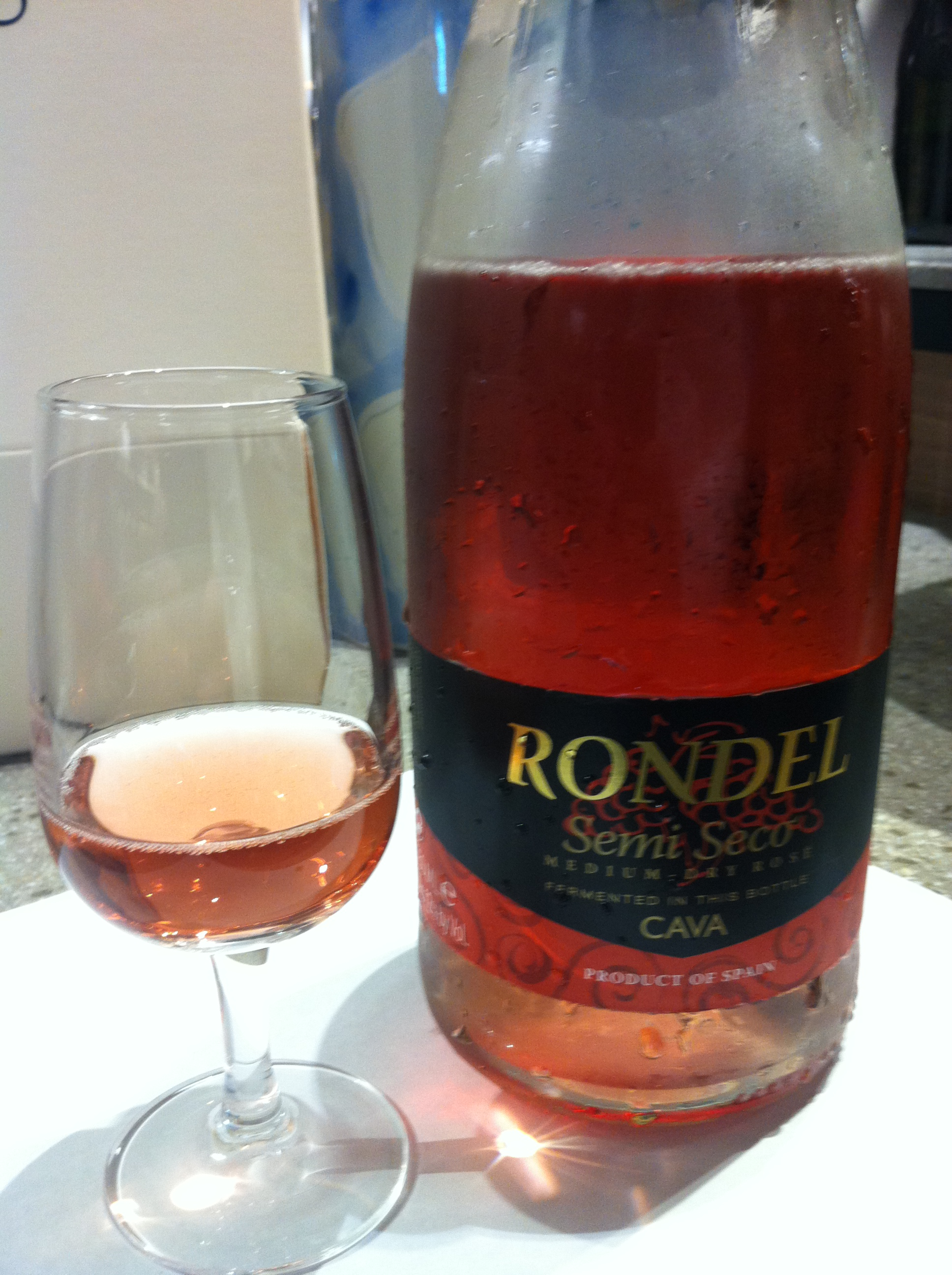
A Spanish rosado Cava with semi-seco indicating its sweetness level on the label.

Sack
An early English term for what is now called Sherry.
Salmanazar
A large bottle holding nine litres, the equivalent of 12 regular wine bottles.
Sangria
A tart punch made from red wine along with orange, lemon and apricot juice with added sugar.
Satsnakheli
A foot-stumping wine press, traditionally used in Georgia. One of the main components of a marani.
Sec/Secco/Seco
French, Italian, Spanish and Portuguese terms for a dry wine. In Champagne production, "Sec" wines are actually medium-dry being sweeter than Brut and Extra Dry with 12-17 grams/liter of sugar added in the dosage.
Secondary aromas
The aromas in wine that are derived from the winemaking process which includes fermentation as well as potentially malolactic fermentation and oak aging. This is in contrast to the primary aromas which come from the grape variety itself and the tertiary aromas which come from aging process in the bottle.
Sekt
A sparkling wine manufactured in Germany.
Selection
German wine classification for dry wines from a single vineyard location
Selection de grains nobles
A sweet botrytized wine made in the French region of Alsace
Semi-generic
Wines made in the United States but named after places that the Alcohol and Tobacco Tax and Trade Bureau requires be modified by a US name of geographic origin. Examples would be New York Chablis, Napa Valley Burgundy or California Champagne.
Semisecco/Semi-seco
Italian and Spanish designation for a medium-dry wine
Sherry
A fortified wine that has been subjected to controlled oxidation to produce a distinctive flavor, produced in the Triangulo de Jerez region of Spain.
Smaragd
In the Austrian wine region Wachau, a classification of wine with a harvest must weight of at least 18.2°KMW and a finished alcohol level of at least 12.5% with no more than 8 g/L residual sugar. These wines are usually the most rich and full-bodied wines from the Wachau that are often made from late-harvest grapes.
Solera
A system of fractional blending used in the production of Sherry where younger wines are added to top up the barrels of older wines as they age in the cellar.
Sommelier
A wine expert who often works in restaurants.
Soutirage
French term for racking.
Sparkling wine
Effervescent wine containing significant levels of carbon dioxide.
Spätlese
German for "late harvest" that is made without chaptalization. A Prädikat in Germany and Austria.
Split
A wine bottle that holds approximately 6 oz (175-187 mL) or one-fourth the equivalent of a typical 750 mL bottle; a single-serving.
Spritzig
German term for a light sparkling wine.
Spumante
Italian term for a sparkling wine made from any production method
Steinfeder

In the Austrian wine region Wachau, a classification of wine with a harvest must weight be between 15 and 17°KMW, with no chaptalization permitted, and a finished alcohol level no greater than 11%. These wines usually the lightest in body among the wines of Wachau.

Stickies
An Australian term for a broad category of sweet wines included fortified and botrytized wines.
Stravecchio
Italian term for a very old wine, often used in association with Marsala
Strohwein/Schilfwein
A German word for "straw wine", same as the French term vin de paille. Refers to a dried grape wine. A Prädikat in Austria.
Super Seconds
A term used in relation to lower classified Bordeaux wine estates that come close in quality to the First Growth Bordeaux estates.
Super Tuscans
A style of Italian wine that became popular in Tuscany in the late 20th century where premium quality wines were produced outside of DOC regulations and sold for high prices with the low level vino da tavola designation.
Supérieur/Superiore
French and Italian terms that indicate a wine has a higher alcohol level and may have received more aging prior to release. In France, this term is often seen with Bordeaux wines
Sur lie
French term for a wine that has spent time aging on the lees during which it may have derived some flavors from autolysis. Often associated with the Loire wines of the Muscadet region.
Sur pointe
French term for a sparkling wine that has been aged with its neck down following the completion of autolysis but before dégorgement. Wines that are being riddled (remuage) will end up sur pointe with the yeast sediment consolidated in the neck of the bottle.
Süss
German term for a sweet wine
Szamorodni
Hungarian wine term meaning "as it comes". A wine with a mixture of healthy and botrytis-infected grapes
Száraz
Hungarian wine term for a dry wine

== T ==
Table wine
Generally any wine that is not sparkling or fortified. In the US these wines must also be between 7% and 14% alcohol by volume. The term table wine also refers to a wine that is considered a good, everyday drinker. In the European Union, the "Table Wine" category (and "Table Wine with a Geographical Indication") was previously the quality category that came below "Quality Wines" or Quality Wines Produced in Specified Regions (QWPSR) such as French AOC and Italian DOCG wines until both terms were eliminated in 2009. Now most European wines that were formally labeled as "Table Wines" are just labeled as "Wine" while those that were labeled as "Table Wine with a Geographical Indication" are now Protected Geographical Indication (PGI).
Tafelwein
German term for table wine.
Taille
In Champagne wine production this is the juice that is retrieved from the second pressing (or "tails") of grapes which is generally considered to be of lower quality than the juice that comes from the first pressing (or "cuvee")
Talento
An Italian sparkling wine made according to the traditional method of Champagne--similar to the Spanish term Cava.
Tastevin
A silver, shallow cup used for tasting wine.
Tasting flight
Refers to a selection of wines, usually between three and eight glasses, but sometimes as many as fifty, presented for the purpose of sampling and comparison.
T.B.A.
An abbreviation for the German wine Trockenbeerenauslese.
Tenuta
Italian term for a wine estate
Terroir
Special characteristics expressed in a wine that result from the interaction of geography, geology, climate, and the plant's genetics.
Tertiary aromas
The aromas in wine that are developed as the wine ages in the bottle. This is in contrast to the primary aromas which come from the grape variety itself and the secondary aromas which come from the winemaking process.
Tinto
Spanish and Portuguese term for a red wine or grape
Tonneau
French cask capable of holding 900 litres (240 US gal) or the equivalent of 100 cases of twelve standard 750 mL (75 cL) bottles of wine. Historically associated with Bordeaux wine.
Transparency

The ability of a wine to clearly portray all unique aspects of its flavor — fruit, floral, and mineral notes.

Triage
A French term referring to the selective picking of grapes, instead of machine harvesting.
Trocken
German for "dry".
Trockenbeerenauslese
A German term meaning approximately "A late harvest of selected dry berries". A type of German wine made from grapes affected by noble rot. Such grapes can be so rare that it can take a skilled picker a day to gather enough for just one bottle. A Prädikat in Germany and Austria.
Typicity
How well a wine reflects the characteristics of its grape variety and terroir

== U ==
UC
Abbreviation for the French term Union Coopérative denoting a regional or local cooperative.
Ullage
The space between the wine and the top of a wine bottle. As a wine ages, the space of ullage will increase as the wine gradually evaporates and seeps through the cork. The winemaking term of "ullage" refers to the practice of topping off a barrel with extra wine to prevent oxidation.
Unctuous
A wine that has layers of soft, concentrated, velvety fruits. Unctuous wines are lush, rich, and intense.
Uva
Italian term for a wine grape
Uvaggio
An Italian term for a wine that has been blended from several grape varieties-the opposite of a varietal. An example would be a Chianti that is based on Sangiovese but include other grape varieties in the bend.

== V ==
Varietal
Wines made from a single grape variety.
VC
Abbreviation for the Spanish term vino comarcal denoting a local wine similar to a vin de pays in France.
VDL
Abbreviation for the French term vin de liqueur denoting a wine that has been fortified prior to fermentation
VDLT
Abbreviation for the Spanish term vino de la tierra denoting a "country wine" similar to the VDQS system of France.
VDN
Abbreviation for the French term vin doux naturel denoting a wine that has been fortified during fermentation.
VDQS
Abbreviation for the French Vin Délimité de Qualité Supérieure system that ranks below Appellation d'Origine Contrôlée (AOC) but above Vin de pays (country wine).
VDT
Abbreviation for the Italian term vino da tavola denoting a table wine.
Vecchio
Italian term for old that may be used as an aging designation that is regulated by some DOC/G wine regions
Vendange
French term for grape harvest
Vendangé à la main
French term for a wine made from grapes that have been harvested by hand
Vendange tardive
French term denoting a late harvest wine. Legally this term can only appear on wine labels from the Alsace wine region to denote wines from exceptionally ripe grapes that have reached a certain pre-determined must weight. For Riesling and Muscat the grapes must be harvested with a potential alcohol level of at least 14%. For Pinot gris and Gewürztraminer, the potential alcohol level needs to be at least 15.3% by volume.
Vendemmia/Vendimia
Italian and Spanish term for grape harvest
Vermouth
An aromatized wine that is made with wormwood and potentially other ingredients.
Vertical wine tasting
In a vertical tasting, different vintages of the same wine type from the same winery are tasted, such as a winery's Pinot noir from five different years. This emphasizes differences between various vintages for a specific wine. In a horizontal tasting, the wines are all from the same vintage but are from different wineries or microclimates.
Vieilles vignes
Literally "old vines" in French, sometimes written as the initials V.V. It is not a regulated term with no official or legal definition of "Vieilles vignes" in any of the wine regions of France.
Viejo
Spanish term for "old"
Vigna/Vigneto
Italian terms for a vineyard
Vigneron
French for vine grower.
Vignoble
French term for a "vineyard"
Vin
French for wine.
Viña
Spanish for vines.
Vin de garde
French term for a wine with the potential to improve with age.
Vin de glace
French term for an ice wine.
Vin de paille
French term for a wine that has been made from dried out grapes such as a straw wine, for example a rare white Vin de paille can be produced in the northern Rhone wine region of the Hermitage AOC from Marsanne.
Vin de pays
French classification system denoting wines that are above vin de table but below VDQS.
Vin de table
French term denoting a table wine, the lowest classification of the French AOC system.
Viña/Viñedo/Vinha
Spanish and Portuguese terms for vineyard
Vinho
Portuguese for wine.
Vinho regional
The lowest level of the Portuguese classification system. Similar to a vin de pays.
Vin mousseux
Generic French term for a sparkling wine.
Vin nouveau
French term similar to Vin primeur denoting a very young wine meant to be consumed within the same vintage year it was produced. Example: Beaujolais nouveau.
Vin ordinaire
French term used to denote an "ordinary wine" as opposed to a premium quality wine.
Vino
Italian and Spanish, originally derived from Latin, for wine.
Vino de mesa/Vino da tavola
Spanish and Italian terms for table wine.
Vino generoso
Spanish term for a fortified wine
Vino novello
Italian term for a Vin primeur.
Vinous
A term used to denoting anything relating to wine.
Vintage
Vintage is the process of picking grapes and creating the finished product. A vintage wine is one made from grapes that were all, or primarily, grown and harvested in a single specified year.
Viticoltore/Vigniaiolo
Italian terms for a wine grape grower
Vitigno
Italian term for a wine grape variety
Vivace
Italian term for a "lively" or lightly sparkling wine

== W ==
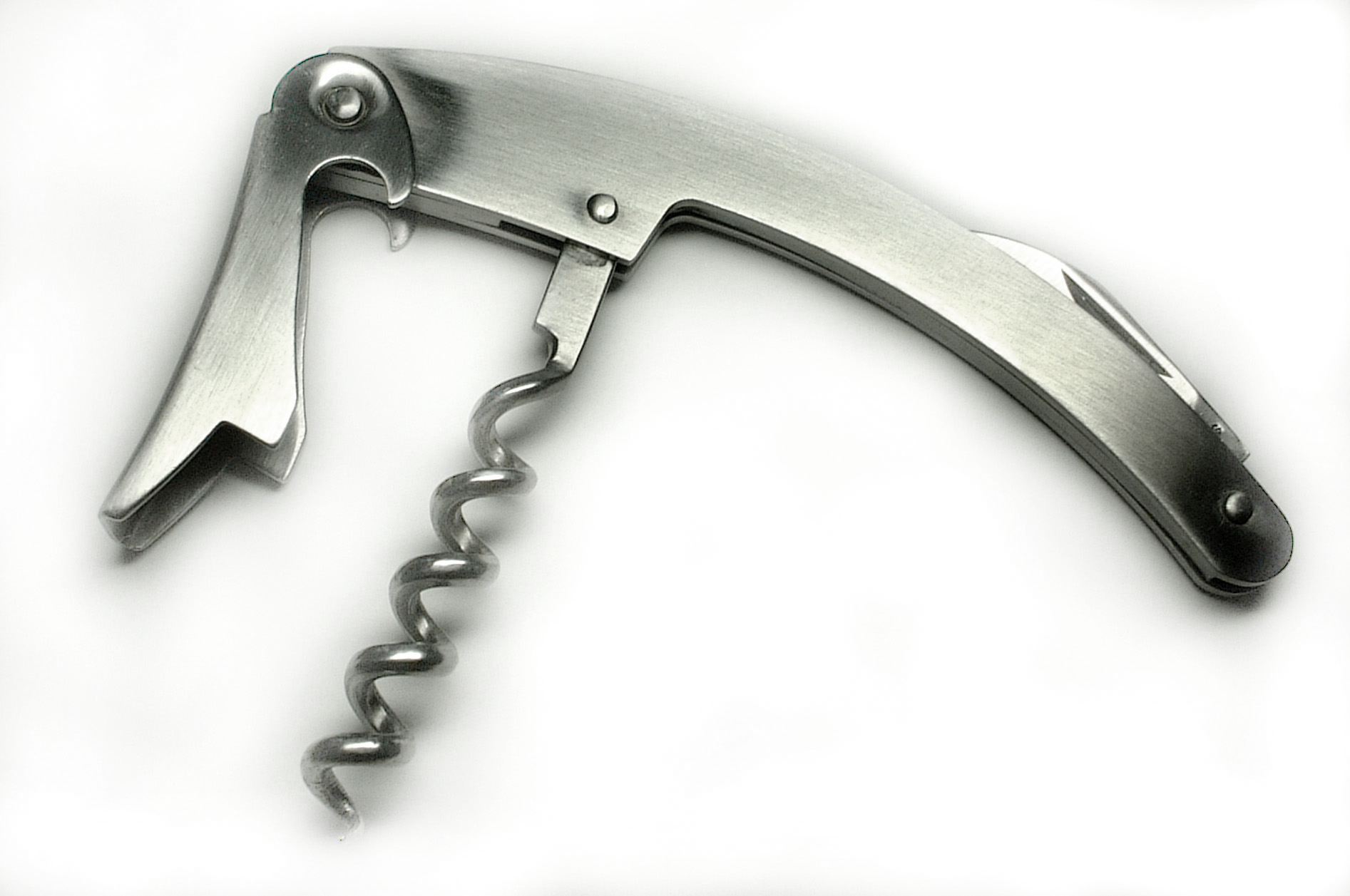
A waiter's friend

Waiter's friend
Also called sommelier knife, a popular type of corkscrew used in the hospitality industry.
Webster
A unit of wine or fortified wine consisting of 1.5L in total.
Weissherbst
A German rosé made from only black grape varieties such as Pinot noir.
Wine
An alcoholic beverage made from the fermentation of unmodified grape juice.

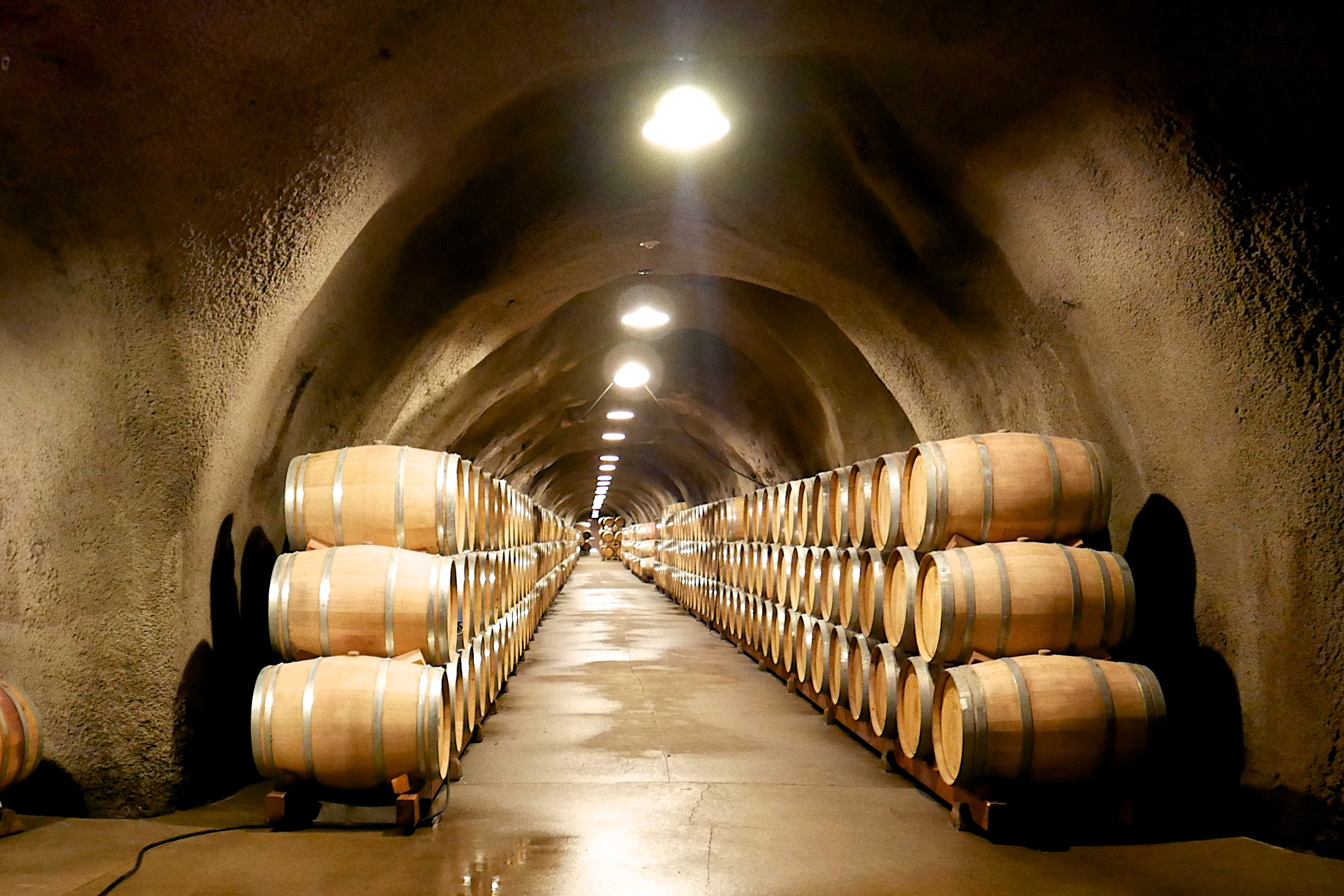
The wine cave at Inglenook winery in Napa Valley.

Wine cave
A subterranean structure for storing and aging wine.
Wine fraud
Any form of dishonesty in the production or distribution of wine.
Wine label
The descriptive sticker or signage adhered to the side of a wine bottle.
Wine lake
Refers to the continuing surplus of wine over demand (glut) being produced in the European Union.
Wine tasting
The sensory evaluation of wine, encompassing more than taste, but also mouthfeel, aroma, and color.
Winzergenossenschaft
German term for a co-operative winery

== X ==
Xylem
The woody tissue of a vine, inside of the vascular cambium layer, that includes heartwood and sapwood, which transports water and nutrients from the roots towards the leaves.

== Y ==
yeast
A micro-organism present on the skins of grapes that reacts with the sugars inside and results in the production of ethyl alcohol during a process called fermentation.
Yield
A measure of the amount of grapes or wine produced per unit surface of vineyard.

== Z ==
Zymology or Zymurgy
The science of fermentation in wine.

== See also ==
- Glossary of viticulture terms
- Glossary of winemaking terms
