= David Quinlan =

David Quinlan may refer to:

- David Quinlan (singer), Northern Irish Christian singer, naturalized Brazilian.
- David Quinlan (film critic)
- David Quinlan (rugby union, born 4 January 1978), Blackrock College RFC, Leinster and Northampton Saints inside centre
- David Quinlan (rugby union, born 26 January 1978), Shannon RFC number eight
