= Harvest (wine) =

Harvest of grapes in order to produce wine

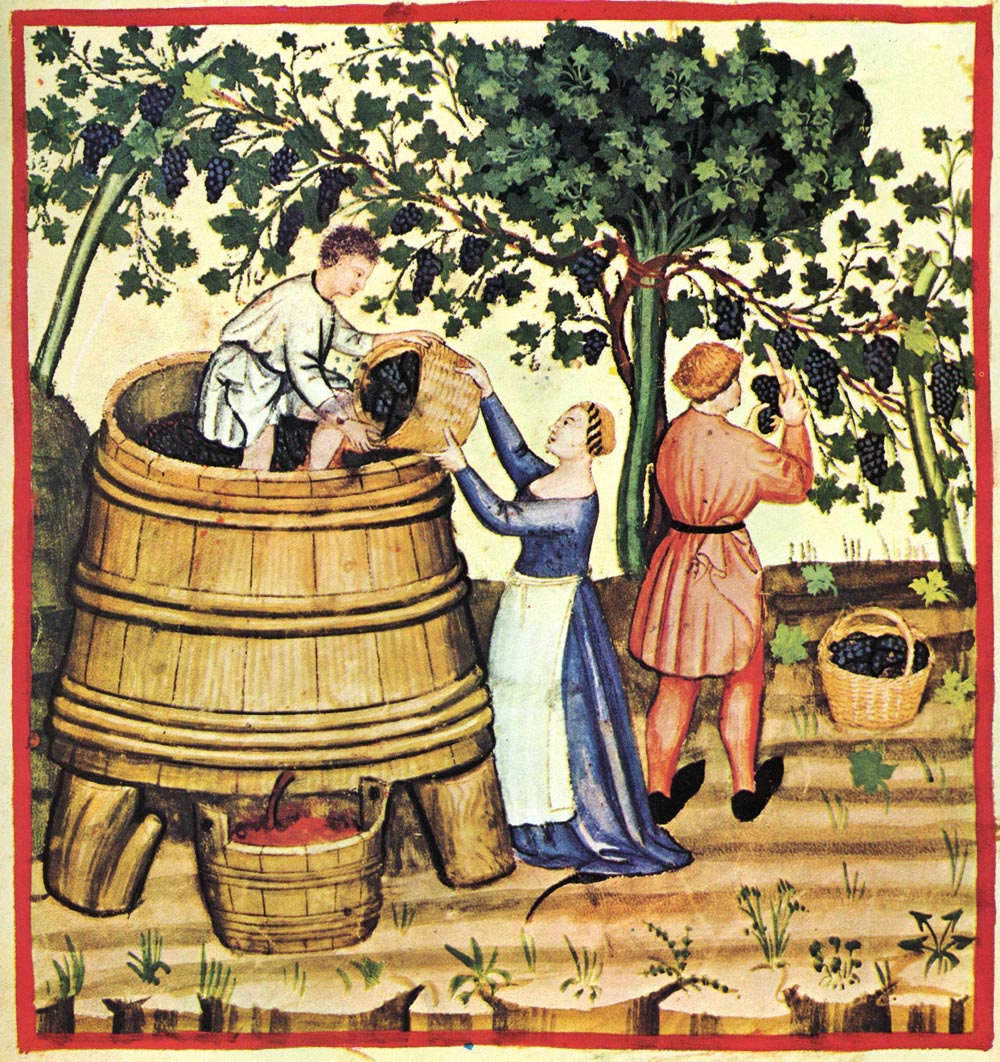
Medieval grape harvesting.

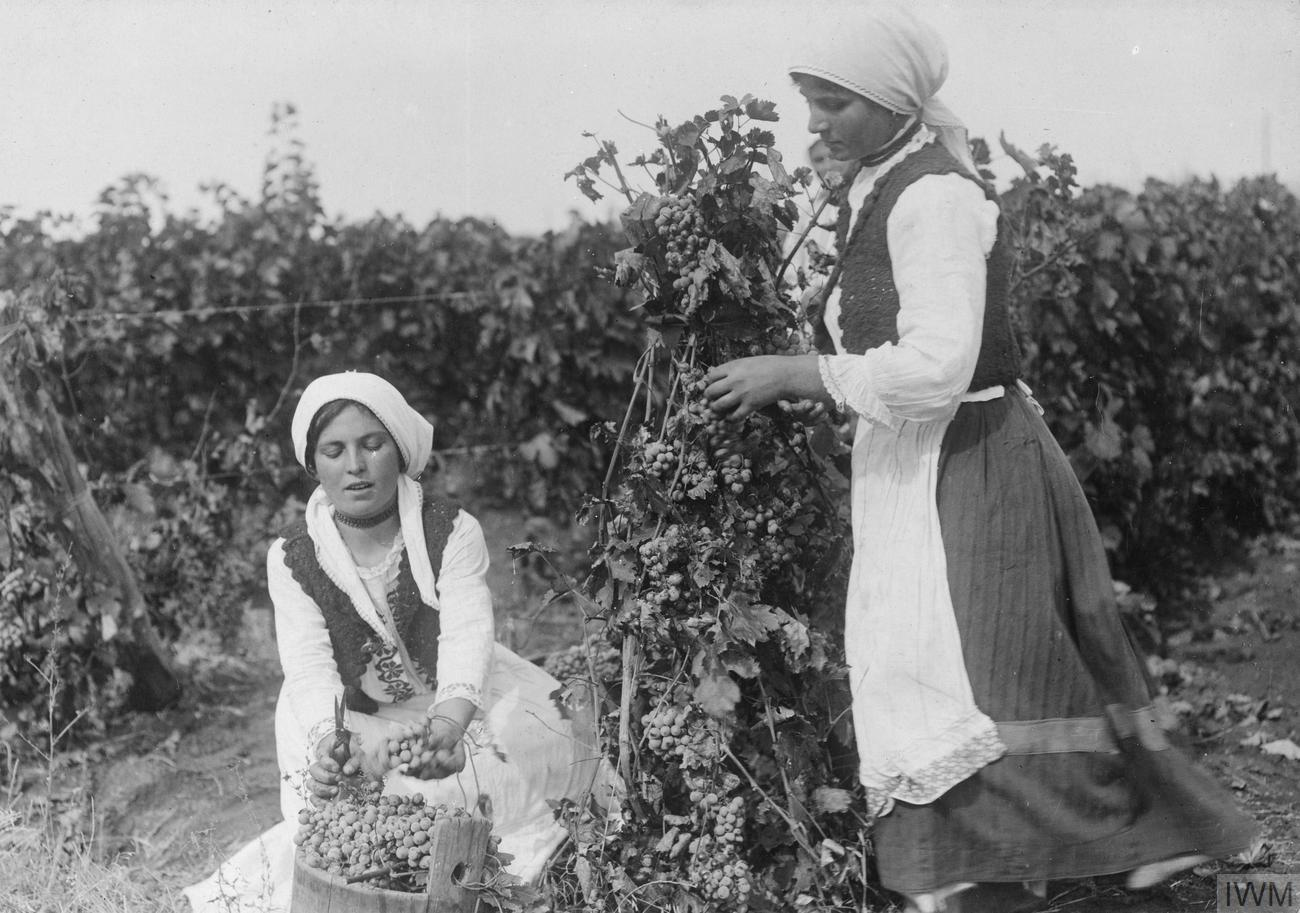
Grape harvesting near Segarcea, Romania, c. 1917

The harvesting of wine grapes (vintage) is one of the most crucial steps in the process of wine-making. The time of harvest is determined primarily by the ripeness of the grape as measured by sugar, acid and tannin levels with winemakers basing their decision to pick based on the style of wine they wish to produce.

The weather can also shape the timetable of harvesting with the threat of heat, rain, hail, and frost which can damage the grapes and bring about various vine diseases. In addition to determining the time of the harvest, winemakers and vineyard owners must also determine whether to use hand pickers or mechanical harvesters.

The harvest season typically falls between August & October in the Northern Hemisphere and February & April in the Southern Hemisphere. With various climate conditions, grape varieties, and wine styles the harvesting of grapes could happen in every month of the calendar year somewhere in the world. In the New World, it is often referred to as the crush.

== Harvest season ==
The majority of the world's wine producing regions lie between the temperate latitudes of 30° and 50° in both hemispheres with regions lying closer to the equator typically harvesting earlier due to their warmer climates. In the Northern Hemisphere, vineyards in Cyprus begin harvesting as early as July. In California some sparkling wine grapes are harvested in late July to early August at a slightly unripe point to help maintain acidity in the wine. The majority of Northern Hemisphere harvesting occurs in late August to early October with some late harvest wine grapes being harvested throughout the autumn. In Germany, Austria, the United States and Canada, ice wine grapes can be harvested as late as January. In the Southern Hemisphere harvest can begin as early as January 1 in some of the warmer climate sites in New South Wales, Australia. The majority of Southern Hemisphere harvesting occurs between the months of February and April with some cool climate sites like Central Otago, New Zealand picking late harvest wine grapes in June.

Recent climate changes (particularly global warming) have shifted the harvest season in some countries; Future weather patterns may exceed a climatic threshold in some vineyards making it more difficult to maintain current wine quality; however, they could also push some regions into more suitable climatic regimes for the production of well-balanced grapes.

== Ripeness ==
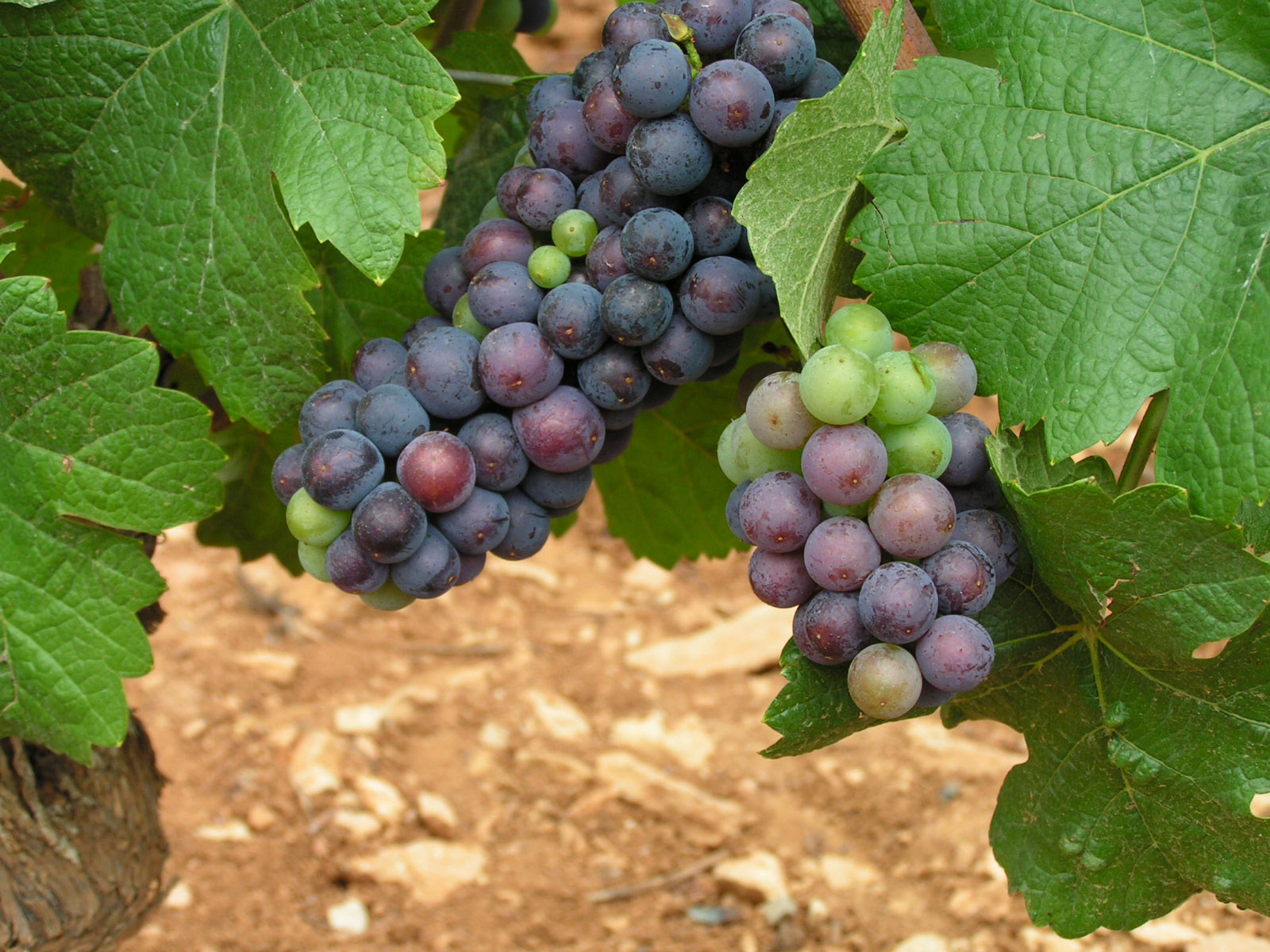
Clusters of ripe and unripe Pinot noir grapes.

Throughout the history of wine, winemakers would use the sugar and acid levels of the grape as a guide in determining ripeness. Early winemakers tasted the grapes to gauge ripeness. Modern winemakers use a refractometer to measure high sugar levels and °Brix or titration tests (using an indicator such as phenolphthalein) to determine the titratable acidity within the grape. In recent times there has been more of an emphasis on the "physiological" ripeness of the grape, usually in the form of tannins and other phenolics. Currently, tasting is the only way to measure tannin ripeness, which can take experience and skill to do accurately. Viticulturalists have not yet fully explained the complex processes that go into the ripening of tannins but most believe it begins with the polymerization of small astringent tannins into larger molecules which are perceived by the taste buds as being softer.

== Mechanical harvesting ==
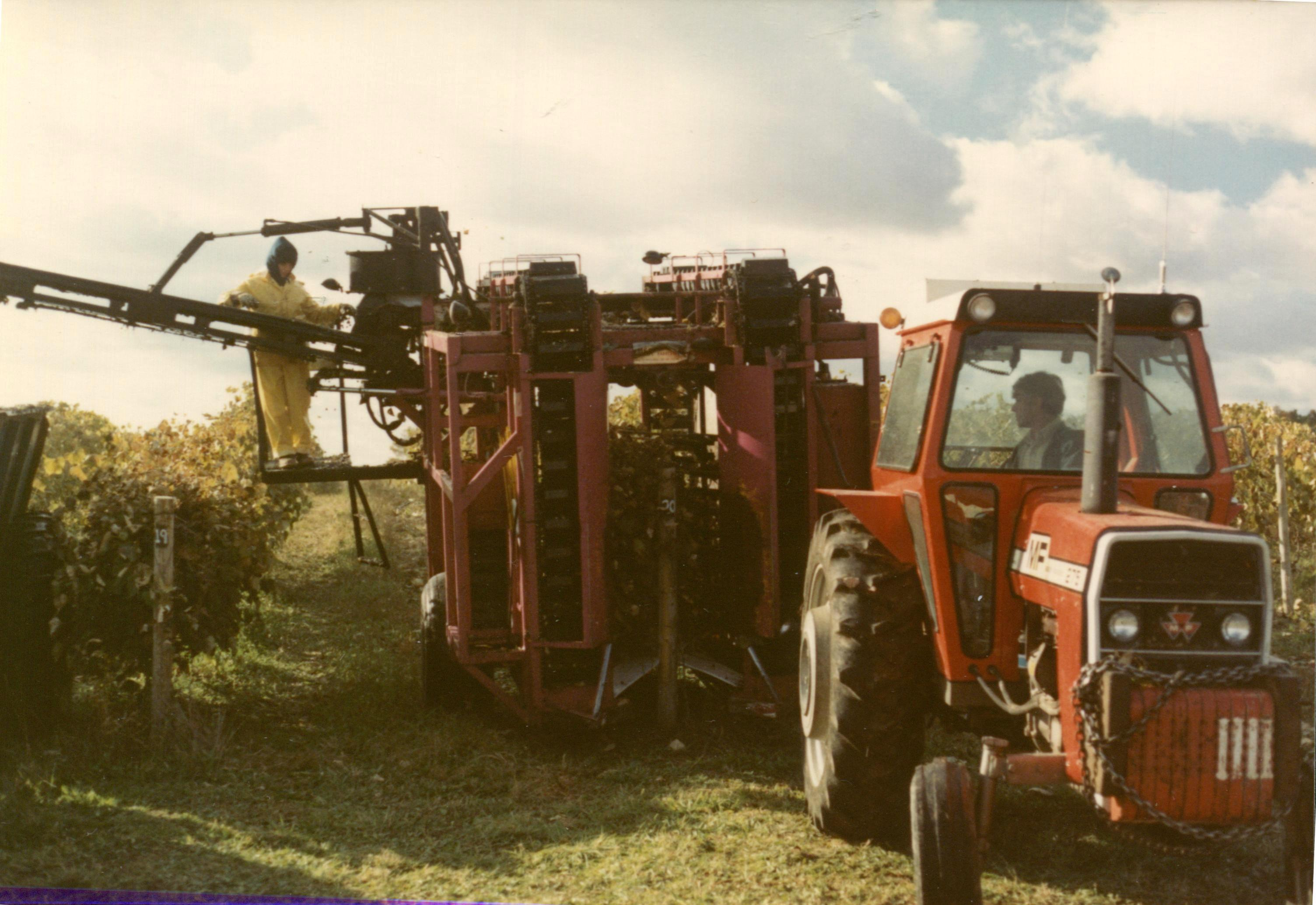
Harvesting Concord grapes

The question of using mechanical harvesting versus traditional hand picking is a source of contention in the wine industry. Mechanical harvesting of grapes has been one of the major changes in many vineyards in the last third of a century. First introduced commercially in the 1960s, it has been adopted in different wine regions for various economic, labor and winemaking reasons. In Australia, the reduced work force in the wine industry has made the use of mechanized labor almost a necessity.

A mechanical grape harvester works by beating the vine with rubber sticks to get the vine to drop its fruit onto a conveyor belt that brings the fruit to a holding bin. As technology improves mechanical harvesters have become more sophisticated in distinguishing grape clusters from mud, leaves and other particles. Despite the improvement many harvesters still have difficulties in distinguishing between ripe, healthy grapes and unripe or rotted bunches which must then be sorted out at the winemaking facility. Another disadvantage is the potential of damaging the grape skins which can cause maceration and coloring of the juice that is undesirable in the production of white and sparkling wine. The broken skins also bring the risk of oxidation and a loss of some of the aromatic qualities in the wine. One of the benefits of mechanical harvesting is the relatively low cost. A harvester is able to run 24 hours a day and pick 80–200 ton of grapes, compared to the 1–2 tons that an experienced human picker could harvest. In hot climates, where picking quickly or in the cool of night is a priority, mechanical harvesting can accomplish these goals very well.

== Hand picking ==
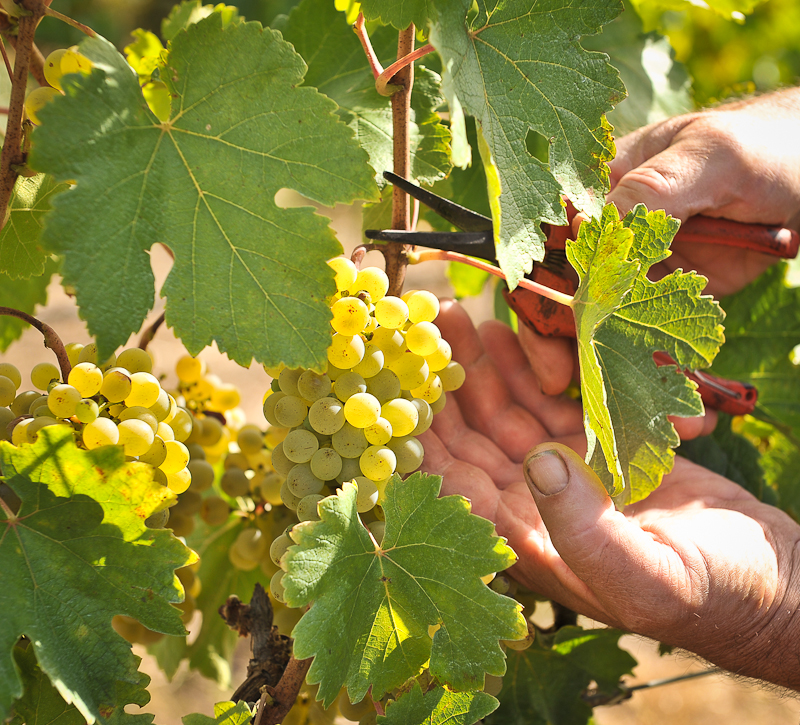
Grüner Veltliner grapes being hand harvested at Hahndorf Hill vineyard in the Adelaide Hills in Australia.

Despite the costs, some wineries prefer the use of human workers to hand-pick grapes. The main advantage is the knowledge and discernment of the worker to pick only healthy bunches and the gentler handling of the grapes. The production of some dessert wine like Sauternes and Trockenbeerenauslese requires that individual berries are picked from the botrytized bunches which can only be done by hand.

In areas of steep terrain, like in the Mosel, it would be virtually impossible to run a mechanical harvester through the vineyard. In many wine regions, migrant workers are a sizable composition of the harvest time work force as well as local student and itinerant workers. Karen Ross, president of the California Association of Winegrape Growers (CAWG), predicted that by 2007 as many as 70% of the employees in the California wine industry would be Mexican immigrants.

A 1993 guidebook for young people wishing to live and work in Paris, gave the following advice about finding grape-picking (Les Vendanges) work in France:

The grape-picking season begins about 15 September in the south of France and in the beginning of October in the other regions. Regions include Beaujolais, Aquitane, Pays de la Loire, Centre, Bourgogne, Midi-Pyrénées and Champagne. The salary is the departmental rate based on the SMIC (31.28frs per hour gross or 160-200frs a day net). Food and accommodation is normally provided and is deducted at the rate of 2 half-hours of SMIC. Each grape-picking camp lasts about 3 weeks.
