= Jun Hasegawa =

Japanese-American model (born 1986)

- 長谷川 潤
- Born: June 5, 1986 (age 40); New Hampshire, United States
- Occupations: Fashion model; Talento
- Years active: 2002–present
- Modeling information
- Height: 164 cm (5 ft 5 in)
- Hair color: Dark brown
- Eye color: Dark brown
- Agencies: LDH (2005 - 2015); Oscar Promotion (2015 - 2020)

Jun Hasegawa (長谷川 潤, Hasegawa Jun; born June 5, 1986, in New Hampshire, United States) is a Japanese-American model who is affiliated with Isle management.

Hasegawa became a popular model when she was an exclusive model in the fashion magazine Vivi in 2005. She appeared in the magazine for eight years and appeared in the magazine, Glamorous, and has been active in the tarento industry.

== Filmography ==
=== TV series ===
Year	Title	Role	Network	Other notes
2004	Mezamashi TV		Fuji TV	Hayamimi Trend No. 1
2007	Yama Onna Kabe Onna		Fuji TV	Episode 3
