= David Quinlan (singer) =

Worship leader, singer-songwriter and pastor

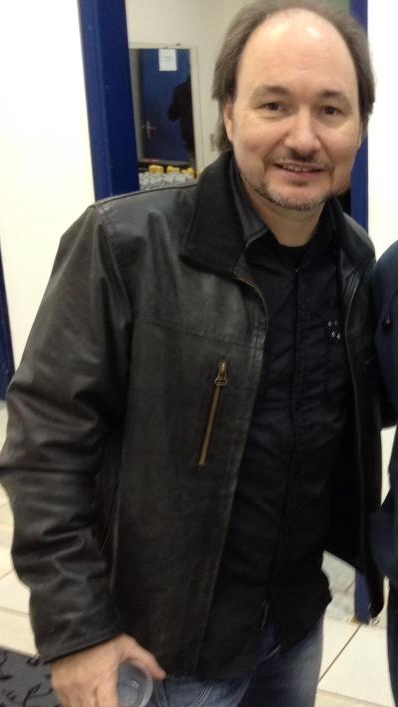

Background information
- Born: David Martin Quinlan; 22 June 1968 (age 58); Belfast, Ulster, Northern Ireland
- Genres: Worship, contemporary Christian music
- Occupations: Singer, songwriter, pastor
- Instruments: Vocals, guitar
- Years active: 1996–present
- Labels: CanZion Brasil, Som Livre, Steven Music
- Website: www.davidquinlan.com.br

David Martin Quinlan (born 22 June 1968) is a Northern Irish worship leader, singer, songwriter and pastor, naturalized Brazilian. His family came to Brazil as a refugee because his father, a great leader of the Catholic movement, converted to Protestantism and suffered a lot of persecution from Catholic ecclesiastical authorities. He was the main precursor in Brazil of the Worship Movement. The singer has received several awards, such as Talento and Promessas Awards.

== Biography ==
Quinlan's ministry in Brazil started mentored by the couple of American charismatic missionaries, Dan and Marti Duke, for whom he worked as a music minister and interpreter. Eight years later, he was sent by his leaders to continue his work independently, thus becoming the head of the "Fogo e Glória" Ministry, later called "Paixão, Fogo e Glória", through which he conducts praise conferences and worship in different cities. He is married to Bebel Quinlan, with whom he has two daughters, Danny and Angel.

Guitarist and vocalist, he recorded translated versions of worship-style songs composed by English-speaking worship leaders such as Matt Redman, Martin Smith, Paul Baloche and internationally acclaimed worship groups such as Hillsong and Vineyard Music. On his albums, however, he has predominantly recorded his own compositions.

Through his contract with the Som Livre label, in 2012 the singer recorded in the studio the album Um Lugar para Dois, which featured several special guest appearances. The duet with singer Ana Paula Valadão on the song "Vem Dançar" became the most popular song on the album.

== Discography ==
=== Albums ===
- Fogo e Glória (1998)
- Em Tua Honra (1999)
- Fogo e Glória Curitiba (2002)
- Abraça-me (2003)
- Águas Profundas (2004)
- Apaixonado por Ti (2004)
- Liberdade (2008)
- No Infinito Deste Amor (2009)
- Além do Véu (2009)
- Libre para Adorar (2010)
- Eu Quero Mais (2011)
- Um Lugar para 2 (Entre Amigos) (2012)
- Meu Chamado, Minha Vida (2016)

=== Singles ===
- "Eu Quero Mais" (2016)
- "Cordas de Amor" (2016)
- "Há Beleza" (2017)
- "Em Intimidade (Acústico)" (2018)
- "Espírito Santo" (2018)
- "Eis o Cordeiro de Deus" (2018)
- "Grandioso És Tu" (2019)
- "Vem Habitar" (2019)
- "Nada Vai Me Separar" (2019)
- "Tudo Que Há em Mim" (2020)
- "Cordeiro de Deus" (2020)
- "Ousado Amor" (2020)
