= Ausbruch =

Wine classification

Ausbruch (literal meaning: "break-out") or sometimes Ausbruchwein is an Austrian wine term for a quality level in the Prädikatswein category. It is situated between Beerenauslese and Trockenbeerenauslese in requirements, which makes it a sweet dessert wine typically made from grapes affected by noble rot. The minimum must weight requirements for Ausbruch is 30 degrees KMW. The Ausbruch Prädikat exists only in Austria and Hungary, not in Germany. The category was introduced into Austrian wine legislation in 1970, as a legalization of the production method allegedly already used in the area of Rust. Ruster Ausbruch are still the most common Ausbruch wines to encounter; in many other Austrian regions, producers classify their wines as Beerenauslese if they fall short of the Trockenbeerenauslese requirements. Since October 2020, the Ruster Ausbruch is legally protected by the Austrian DAC system of origins as "Ruster Ausbruch DAC".

== Wine production ==
The term Ausbruch initially designated a wine made from mixing grapes strongly affected by noble rot with must from less concentrated grapes, in the Spätlese to Beerenauslese range. This filled the purpose of dissolving crystallized sugars in the grapes in order to speed up the fermentation and make it more efficient. This has also been called to "break out" the sugar, which is how the term was coined. This is the same as Aszú method of the Tokaji Aszú and Tokajský výber wines are produced in Austria's neighbouring countries Hungary and Slovakia, although a classification system with several levels is used there. However, in difference from the Aszú and "výber" methods, Ausbruch wines are not required to be made by mixing the two components, and in reality almost all present-day Austrian Ausbruch wines are produced in the same way as a Trockenbeerenauslese, but subject to a 27 ºKMW rather than 30 ºKMW requirement.

== Grape varieties ==
Historically the Hungarian grape Furmint was used in Ausbruch production but today it is rarely found in Austria. Most producers use a mix of grape varieties with Chardonnay, Pinot blanc, Traminer and Welschriesling being the most popular.
