= David Quinlan (rugby union, born 26 January 1978) =

Irish rugby union player

David Quinlan (born 1978) is an Irish rugby union player. He plays as a number 8 for Shannon RFC, where he has been captain since 2005. In the past he has also played for Buccaneers RFC.
