= Noble rot =

Grey fungus affecting wine grapes

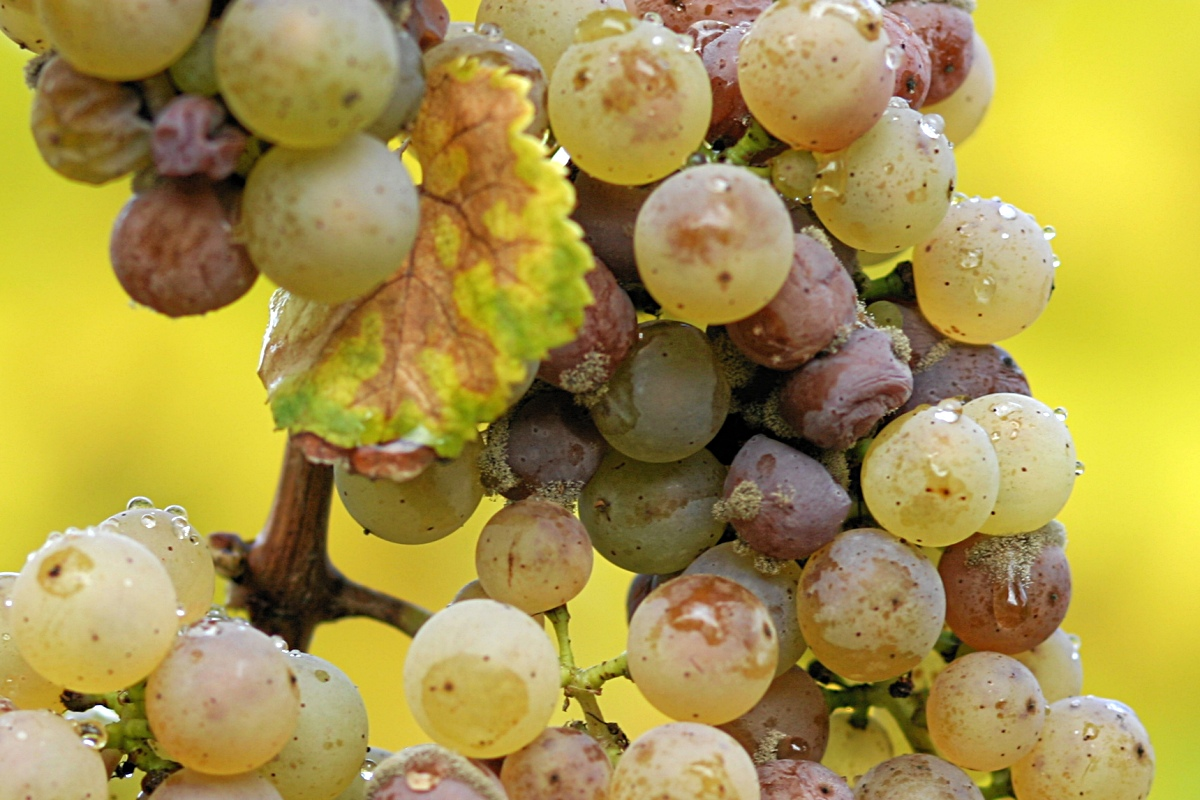
Noble rot on Riesling grapes (Rheingau, Germany, 2005)

Noble rot (French: pourriture noble; German: Edelfäule; Italian: Muffa nobile; Hungarian: Aszúsodás) is the beneficial form of a grey fungus, Botrytis cinerea, affecting wine grapes. Infestation by Botrytis requires warm and humid conditions, typically around 20 °C (68 °F) and above 80% humidity. If the weather stays wet, the undesirable form, "bunch rot" or "grey rot", adversely affects winemaking by disrupting fermentation and changing the taste, aroma, and appearance of the final wine. Grapes typically become infected with cinerea when they are ripe. If they are then exposed to drier conditions and become partially raisined, this form of infection is known as noble rot. Grapes picked at a certain point during infestation can produce particularly fine and concentrated sweet wine. Wines produced by this method are known as botrytized wines, and are considered a distinct category of dessert wines.

The primary distinction between botrytized wines and other naturally sweet, non-fortified sweet wines, such as late-harvest wines, ice wines, or straw/raisin wines, lies in the range and richness of aroma compounds generated by Botrytis cinerea. Significant differences are also evident in other components, like sugar alcohol and acid composition, due to microbial activity. Descriptors frequently used for these wines highlight flavours of peach, apricot, pear, quince, raisin, and honey, along with unique "botrytis" or roti characteristics. Additionally, a notable feature of botrytized wines is their high acid content, which prevents them from tasting cloying, even with sugar levels often exceeding 200 g/L.

== Effect on grapes ==
When Botrytis cinerea infects grapes, it initiates several physiological changes that are crucial for the development of noble rot wines. The fungus penetrates the grape skins while feeding on the grapes, causing microscopic wounds that lead to the evaporation of water from the berries. This dehydration concentrates the remaining sugars, acids, and flavour compounds within the grapes, resulting in their higher density. The mass of the grapes can decrease by up to 60%, leaving behind a shrivelled, sugar-rich berry.

The fungus primarily consumes tartaric acid, which is more prevalent than malic or citric acid in healthy grapes, with remaining tartaric acid transformed into gluconic acid and glycerol. As observed in Furmint grapes used for Tokaji Aszú, the infection process changes the ratio of tartaric to malic acid, from 2:1 in healthy berries to 1:3 in botrytised berries. The increased levels of citric acid and the formation of higher levels of sugar alcohols (such as glycerol, arabitol, mannitol, sorbitol, and inositol) contribute to the complexity and mouthfeel of botrytized wines. The grapes' metabolic stress response also leads to the production and concentration of various aroma compounds. The berries concentrate precursors for citrus aromas like lemon and grapefruit, and also generate compounds for stone fruit aromas such as apricot and peach in a direct metabolic response to the fungal attack. Some of these aromatic characteristics, including the distinct honey aroma, are directly attributable to the botrytis fungus itself.

The stress response of grapes to botrytis infection is similar to their response to drought. The breakdown of grape skin cells by the fungus facilitates water evaporation, intensifying the dehydration process. This stress response allows the grapes to adapt metabolically, slowing down the infection rate compared to grey rot, which spreads too quickly for the plant to respond effectively.

== Origins ==
According to Hungarian legend, the first aszú (a wine using botrytised grapes) was made by Laczkó Máté Szepsi in 1630. However, mention of wine made from botrytised grapes appears before this in the Nomenklatura of Fabricius Balázs Sziksai, which was completed in 1576. When vineyard classification began in 1730 in the Tokaj region, one of the gradings given to the various terroirs centered on their potential to develop Botrytis cinerea.

There is a popular story that the practice originated independently in Germany, where the Riesling producers at Schloss Johannisberg (Geisenheim, in the Rheingau region) traditionally awaited the say-so of the estate owner, Heinrich von Bibra, Bishop of Fulda, before cutting their grapes. In 1775, the story claims the abbey messenger was robbed en route to delivering the order, delaying cutting by three weeks, time enough for the Botrytis to take hold. The grapes were presumed worthless and given to local peasants, who produced a surprisingly good, sweet wine which became known as Spätlese, or late harvest wine. In the following few years, several different classes of increasing must weight were introduced, and the original Spätlese was further elaborated, first into Auslese in 1787 and later Eiswein in 1858 (although Eiswein is usually made from grapes not affected by Botrytis).

== Viticulture and uses ==
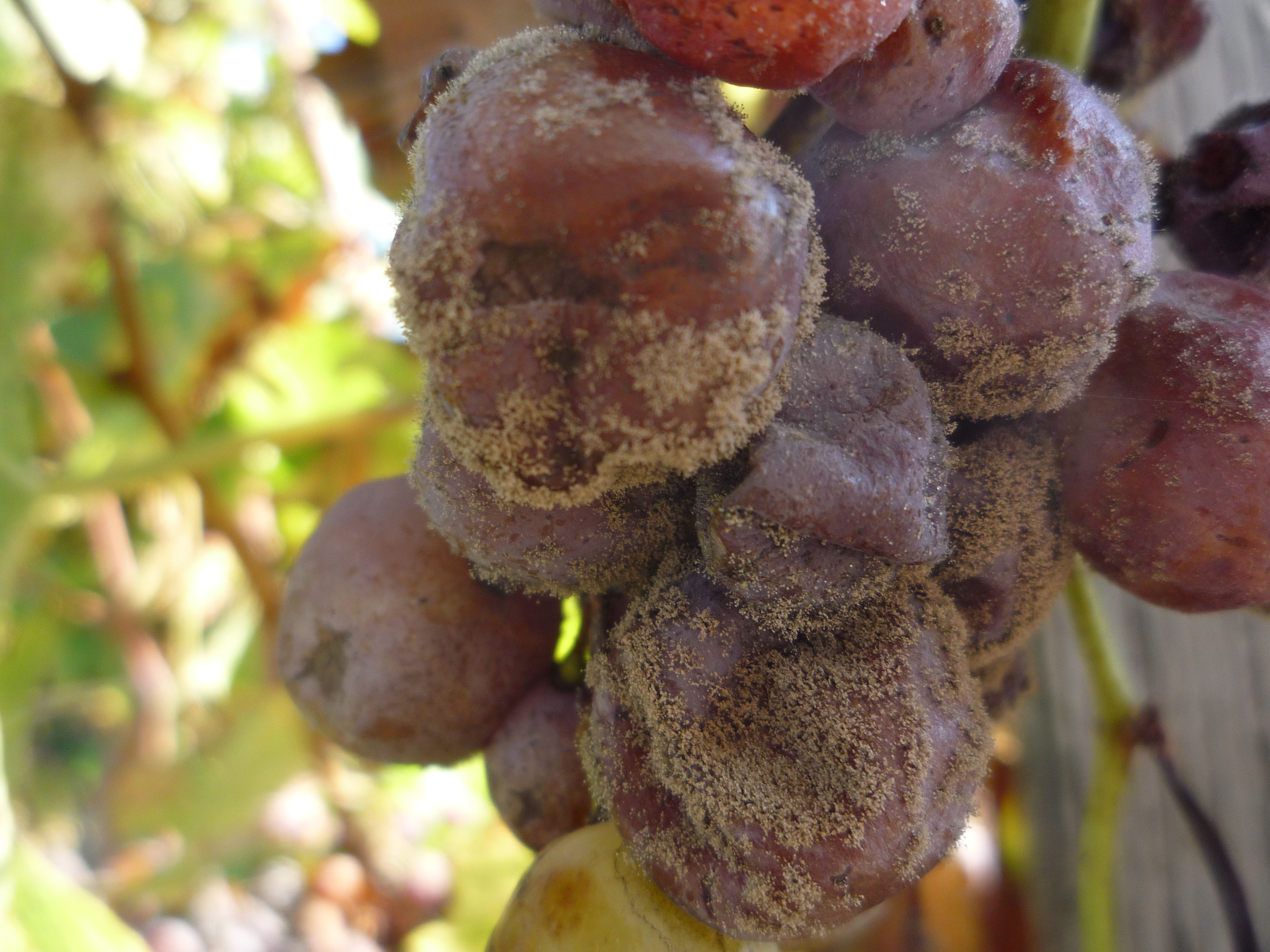
Botrytis cinerea on Sémillon grapes in Sauternes

In some cases, inoculation occurs when spores of the fungus are sprayed over the grapes, while some vineyards depend on natural inoculation from spores present in the environment.

Botrytized wines can be made using many varieties of grape. Due to anthocyanin oxidation, a majority of varieties are white. The ideal varieties mature late in the season in order for ripening to coincide with the best environmental conditions for noble rot to occur. Thick skinned cultivars can also be used to make harvesting infected grapes less difficult. Riesling and Sémillon are the primary cultivars used in the production of botrytized wines. The Hungarian variety, Furmint, is the predominant variety used in the production of Tokaji Aszú. Other varieties, such as Picolit, Gewürztraminer, Chenin blanc, and Pinot blanc, are used, depending on tradition and adaptation to local conditions. Jackson, Ronald (2008). Wine Science Principles and Applications. Oxford, UK: Elsevier Inc. p. 525. ISBN 978-0-12-373646-8.

Some of the finest botrytized wines are picked berry by berry in successive tris (French for "selections").

Internationally renowned botrytized wines include the aszú of Tokaj-Hegyalja in Hungary (commonly called Tokaji or Tokay), Sauternes from France – where the process is known as pourriture or pourriture noble, and Beerenauslese or Trockenbeerenauslese wines from Germany and Austria. Other wines of this type include the Romanian Grasă de Cotnari, French Coteaux du Layon, French Monbazillac, Austrian Ausbruch, South African Noble Late Harvest and Croatian wine maker Vinarija Mihalj from Kutjevo (producing Mačevo brdo-Graševina). Depending on conditions, the grapes may be only minimally botrytized. Botrytized wines are also produced by Californian and Australian winemakers.
