= Semi-generic =

Legal term for a type of wine

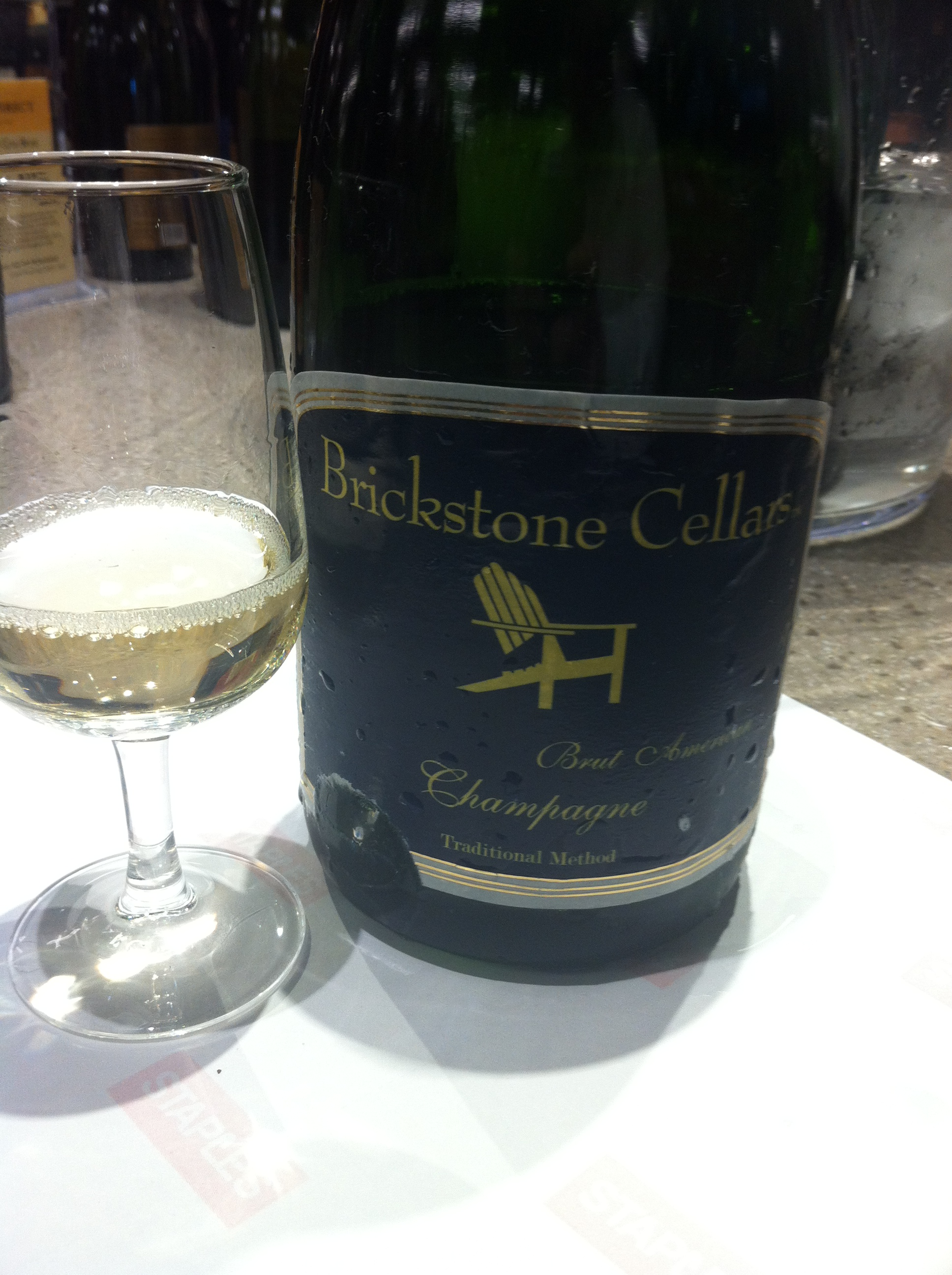
Sparkling wine with the semi-generic "Brut American champagne" on the label

Semi-generic is a legal term used in by the United States Alcohol and Tobacco Tax and Trade Bureau to refer to a specific type of wine designation. The majority of these were originally based on the names of well-known European wine-producing regions. Consumers didn't recognize grape varieties at that time and New World producers used the familiar names to suggest the style of wine they were offering for sale. U.S. regulations require that semi-generic names (for example, California champagne) may be used on a wine label only if there appears next to such name the appellation of "the actual place of origin" in order to prevent any possible consumer confusion.

The practice primarily ceased in 2006 with the Wine Trade Agreement, though existing brands can continue the practice, considered grandfathered in.

== Recent problems ==
Over the past thirty years, with the popularity of varietal labeling, semi-generic names have largely fallen out of use. They are typically only used on inexpensive wines sold in jugs or cartons and most of those now use the more popular varietal labeling.

The use of these names is a subject of some disagreement. Through trade agreements, the European Union has protected most of these names in its major export markets. In 1993, Australia agreed not to use European place names and France and Italy agreed to stop using the term Tokay, which is now reserved for Hungarian wines. The use of semi-generic names is beginning to become a problem for US domestic and foreign policy because as many American Viticultural Areas (AVAs) are becoming more popular around the world, they are seeking greater protection for their names inside and outside the U.S. In 2006, the U.S. agreed with the EU in the Wine Trade Agreement to refrain from adding any additional labels to class of semi-generic wines.

Some U.S. states have laws which additionally restrict or prohibit the use of semi-generic names wines produced within their borders.

== Definition ==
In the U.S., semi-generics are defined by law in 27 CFR 4.24. There are two types. The first type is names that can legally refer to any grape wine whatsoever. In practice, most have become associated with a given style, which is noted.

- Burgundy – Generic red wine, for example Gallo's Hearty Burgundy. Named after French Burgundy.
- Chablis – Generic white wine, named after Chablis.
- Chianti – Generic red, named after Italy's Chianti.
- Claret – Also generic red wine, named after Claret, the British term for French red Bordeaux.
- Malaga – A sherry, named after Málaga in Spain.
- Moselle – Generic sweet white, based on a German style produced in the Moselle River valley.
- Rhine Wine (syn. Hock) – Generic sweet white, after Germany's Rhine River. Hock is named after Hochheim.
- Sauterne – White or pink, dry or sweet, named after Sauternes but deliberately misspelled.
- Haut Sauterne – Same as above.
- Tokay – Generic white, named after Hungary's Tokaji.

The second type of semi-generic names have restrictions on what kind of wine they can be. The legal restriction is listed first, followed by the original term.

- Angelica – Fortified wine of 18–24% alcohol, named after Los Angeles.
- Champagne – Sparkling wine, named after France's Champagne.
- Marsala – Wine of 14–24% alcohol, named after Italy's Marsala.
- Madeira – Fortified wine of 18–24% alcohol, named after Portugal's Madeira.
- Port – Fortified wine, named after Portugal's Porto.
- Sherry Fortified wine of 17–24% alcohol, named after Spain's Sherry.

== See also ==
- Wine label
- Fighting varietals

== Sources ==
- Label Approval for Wine Labels with a Semi-Generic Name
- Robinson, Jancis (Ed.) The Oxford Companion to Wine. Oxford: Oxford University Press, second edition, 1999.
- Agreement between the United States and the European Community on Trade in Wine
