= Dessert wine =

Sweet wine typically served with dessert

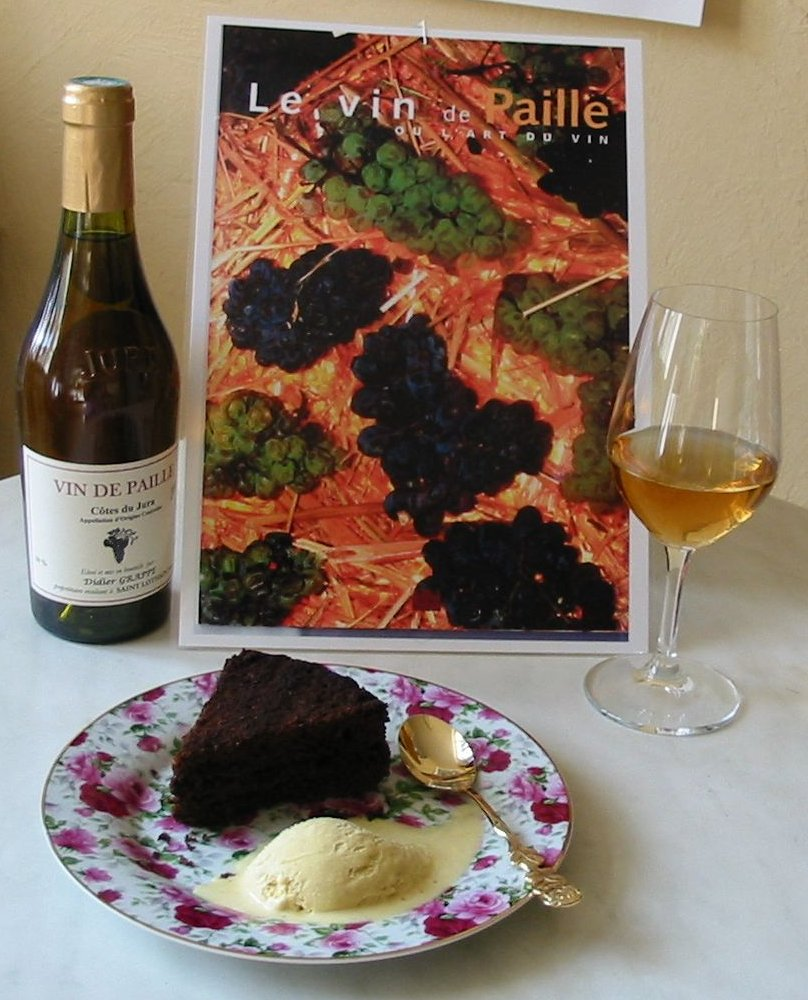
Vin de Paille, a straw wine from France

Dessert wines, sometimes called pudding wines in the United Kingdom, are sweet wines typically served with dessert.

There is no simple definition of a dessert wine. In the UK, a dessert wine is considered to be any sweet wine drunk with a meal, as opposed to the white fortified wines (fino and amontillado sherry) drunk before the meal and the red fortified wines (port and madeira) drunk after it. Thus, most fortified wines are regarded as distinct from dessert wines, but some of the less-strong fortified white wines, such as Pedro Ximénez sherry and Muscat de Beaumes-de-Venise, are regarded as honorary dessert wines. In the United States, by contrast, a dessert wine is legally defined as any wine over 14% alcohol by volume, which includes all fortified wines—and is taxed more highly as a result. This dates back to when the US wine industry only made dessert wines by fortification, but such a classification is outdated now that modern yeast and viticulture can produce dry wines over 15% without fortification (and German dessert wines can contain half that amount of alcohol).

== Methods of production ==
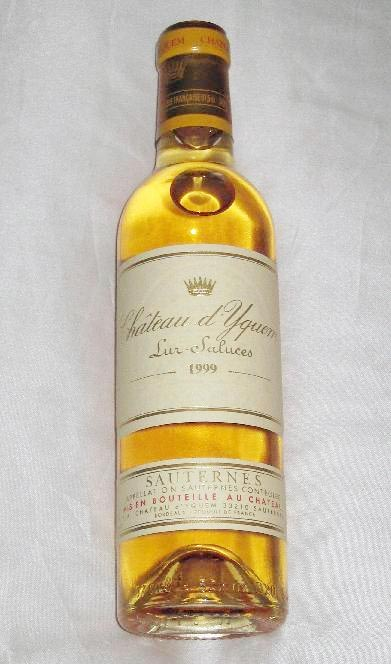
Château d'Yquem 1999. A dessert wine from Sauternes made by so-called "noble rot"

Makers of dessert wines want to produce a wine containing high levels of both sugar and alcohol. Since all winemaking creates alcohol from fermentation of sugars they are typically traded off. However, there are many ways to increase relative sugar levels in the final wine:

- grow grapes so that they naturally have sugar to spare for both sweetness and alcohol.
- add sugar, either:
  - before fermentation as sugar or honey (Chaptalization)
  - after fermentation as unfermented must (Süssreserve).
- add alcohol (typically brandy) before all the sugar is fermented (fortification or 'mutage').
- remove water to concentrate the sugar:
  - In warm climates, by air drying the grapes to make raisin wine
  - In frosty climates, by freezing out some of the water to make ice wine
  - In damp temperate climates, by using a fungal infection, Botrytis cinerea, to desiccate the grapes with noble rot

== Natural sweetness ==
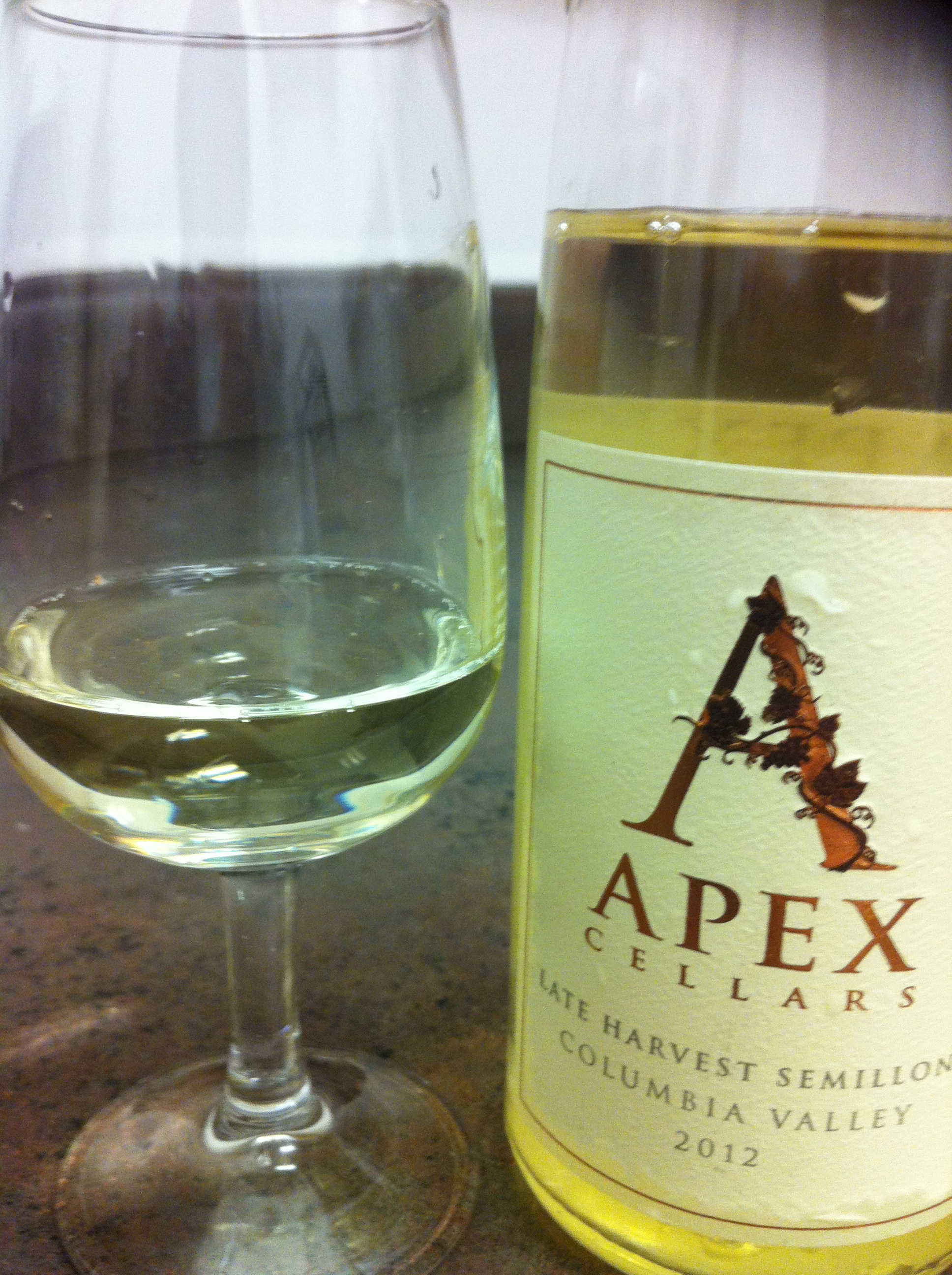
A late harvest Semillon from Washington State.

In the absence of other techniques, makers of dessert wine have to produce their sugar in the vineyard. Some grape varieties, such as Muscat, Ortega and Huxelrebe, naturally produce much more sugar than others. Environmental conditions have a big effect on ultimate sugar levels; the vigneron can help by leaving the grapes on the vine until they are fully ripe, and by green harvesting and pruning to expose the young grapes to the sun. Green harvesting reduces the number of bunches on a vine early in the summer, so that the sugar production of the leaves is divided between fewer bunches. While the vigneron cannot control the sun, a sunny year regulates sugar levels. The semi-sweet Auslese wines in the German wine classification are probably the best example of this approach; most modern winemakers perceive that their customers want either fully dry or 'properly' sweet dessert wines, so 'leave it to nature' is currently out of fashion. But most of the Muscats of ancient times were probably made this way, including the famous Constantia of South Africa.

== Chaptalization ==
Honey was added to wine in Roman times, for sweetness and to increase the final strength of the wine. Today sugar is usually added in order to boost the alcohol levels of flabby, unripe wines rather than for sweetness, although a degree of chaptalization is permitted in the wines of many countries. German wines must declare whether they are 'natural' or not; in any case, chaptalization is banned from the top tiers of German wines.

== Süssreserve ==
The 'reserve of sweetness' is a German technique in which unfermented must (grape juice) is added to the wine after fermentation. This increases the sweetness of the final wine and dilutes the alcohol somewhat—in Germany the final wine can contain no more than 15% Süssreserve by volume. Süssreserve allows winemakers to fully ferment the wine without having to worry about stopping fermentation before all the sugar has gone. Since sulphites are used to stop fermentation, this technique reduces the usage of sulphites. Süssreserve is used by other makers of German-style wines, particularly in New Zealand.

== Fortification ==
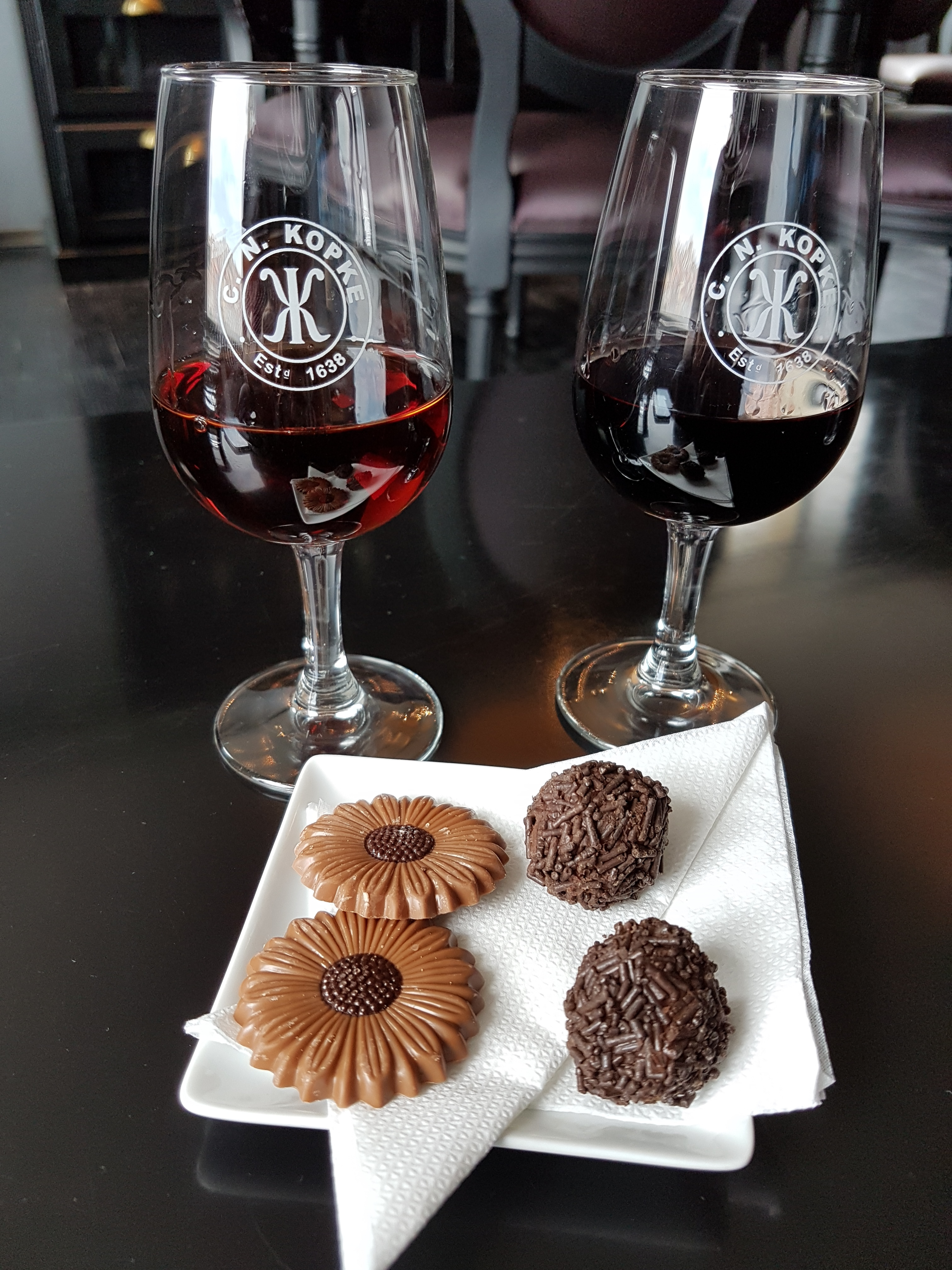
Port wine, a fortified wine

The main fortified wines drunk with dessert are sweet Montilla-Moriles & sherry, particularly Pedro Ximénez, and vins doux naturels. The Pedro Ximenez dessert wine is unique because it is a raisin wine that is then fortified and aged in a solera system like other sweet wine from Andalucia. Other sweet sherries (is a blend wine) such as Bristol Cream may also be drunk as dessert wine.

The production of vins doux naturels was perfected by Arnaud de Villeneuve at the University of Montpellier in the 13th century. They are now quite common in the Languedoc-Roussillon of southwest France. As the names suggest, Muscat de Beaumes-de-Venise, Muscat de Rivesaltes, Muscat de Frontignan, Muscat de Lunel, Muscat de Mireval and Muscat de St-Jean Minervois are all made from the white Muscat grape, whilst Banyuls and Maury are made from red Grenache. Regardless of the grape, fermentation is stopped with up to 10% of 95% grape spirit. The Muscats are made in a somewhat oxidised style, the Grenaches less so.

== Raisin wine ==
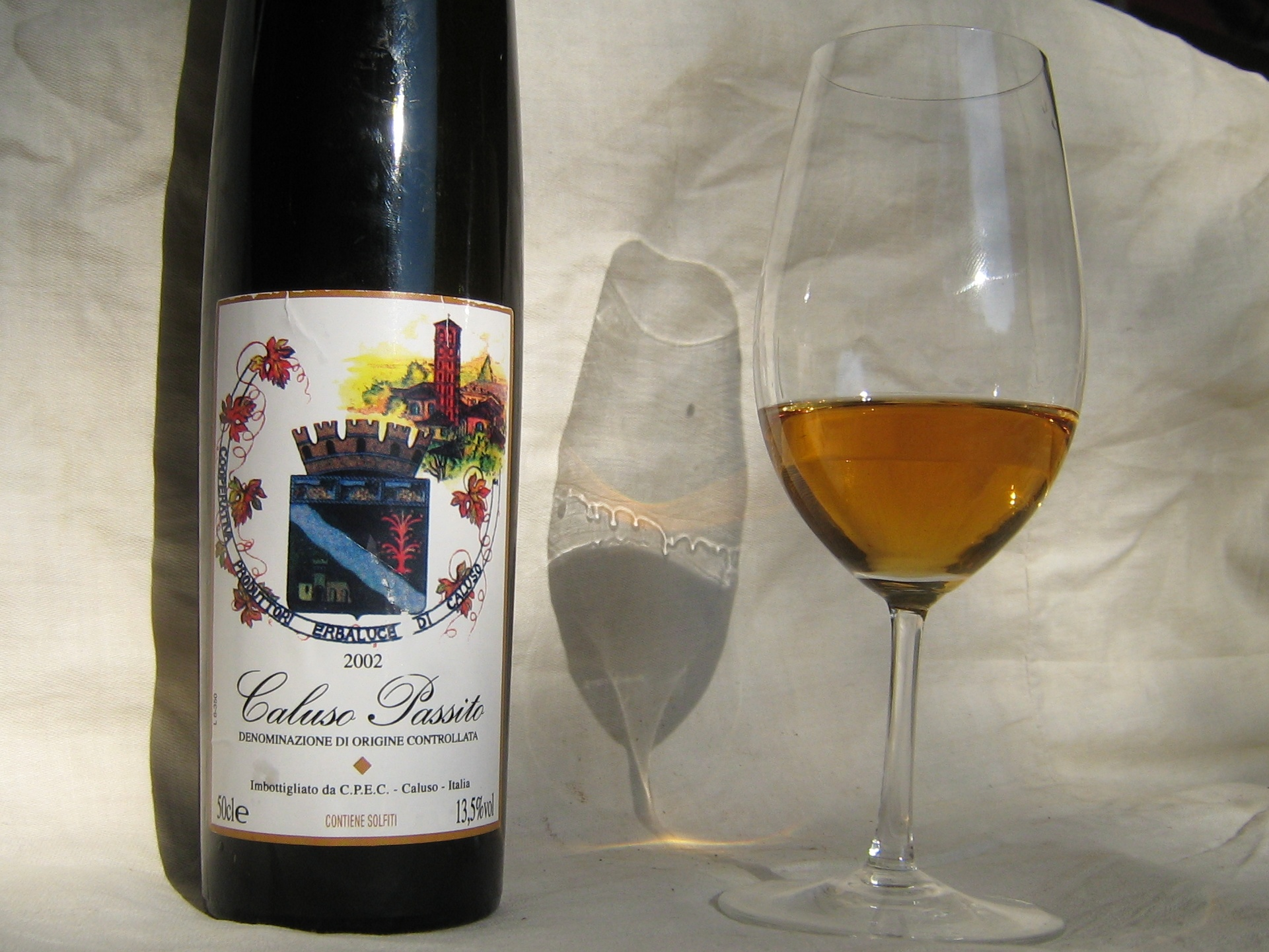
Glass of Caluso passito, a raisin wine from Piedmont

In ancient Carthage, a sweet wine called passum was made from air-dried grapes and across the Malta Channel from the site of Carthage similar wines are still made, called Moscato Passito di Pantelleria. Such wines were described by the Romans. Northern Italy is home to a number of 'passito' wines, where the grapes are dried on straw, on racks, or hung from the rafters. These wines include Vin Santo (into which almond biscuits, 'cantucci', are traditionally dunked), Sciachetrà, Recioto di Soave (drunk with the local version of panettone) and the sweet red Recioto della Valpolicella (which stands up to chocolate better than most wine). Across the Alps, the French make 'straw wine' (vin de paille) in the Jura, Rhone and Alsace; the Spanish start off making a raisin wine with Pedro Ximénez before fortifying it; the Cypriots have their ancient Commandaria; and there have been recent experiments with the style in South Africa and the US.

== Ice wine ==
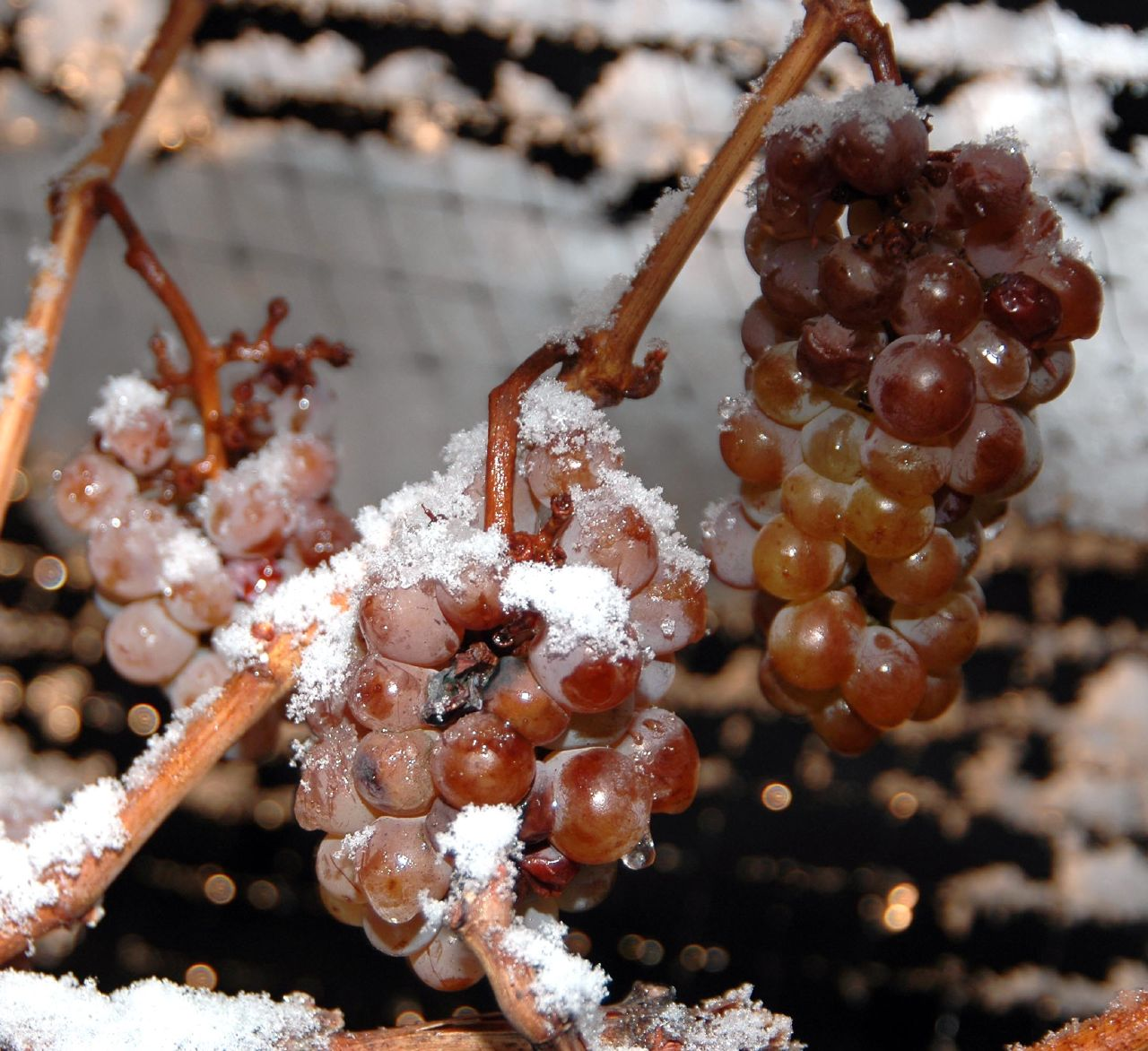
Grapes for ice wine

Most wine laws require temperatures below at most −7 °C (19 °F) before the grapes for ice wine can be picked. At such temperatures, some water in the grapes freezes but the sugars and other solids remain dissolved in the remaining juice. If the grapes are pressed while frozen, a very concentrated must can result, which needs special yeast and a long time to ferment. The resulting wines are very sweet, but balanced by their acidity. The minuscule yields mean they tend to be very expensive. The most famous are German Eiswein and Canadian Icewine, but ice wines are also made in the United States, Austria, Croatia, Czech Republic, Slovakia, Slovenia, Hungary, Italy, Australia, France and New Zealand in smaller quantities.

== Noble rot wine ==
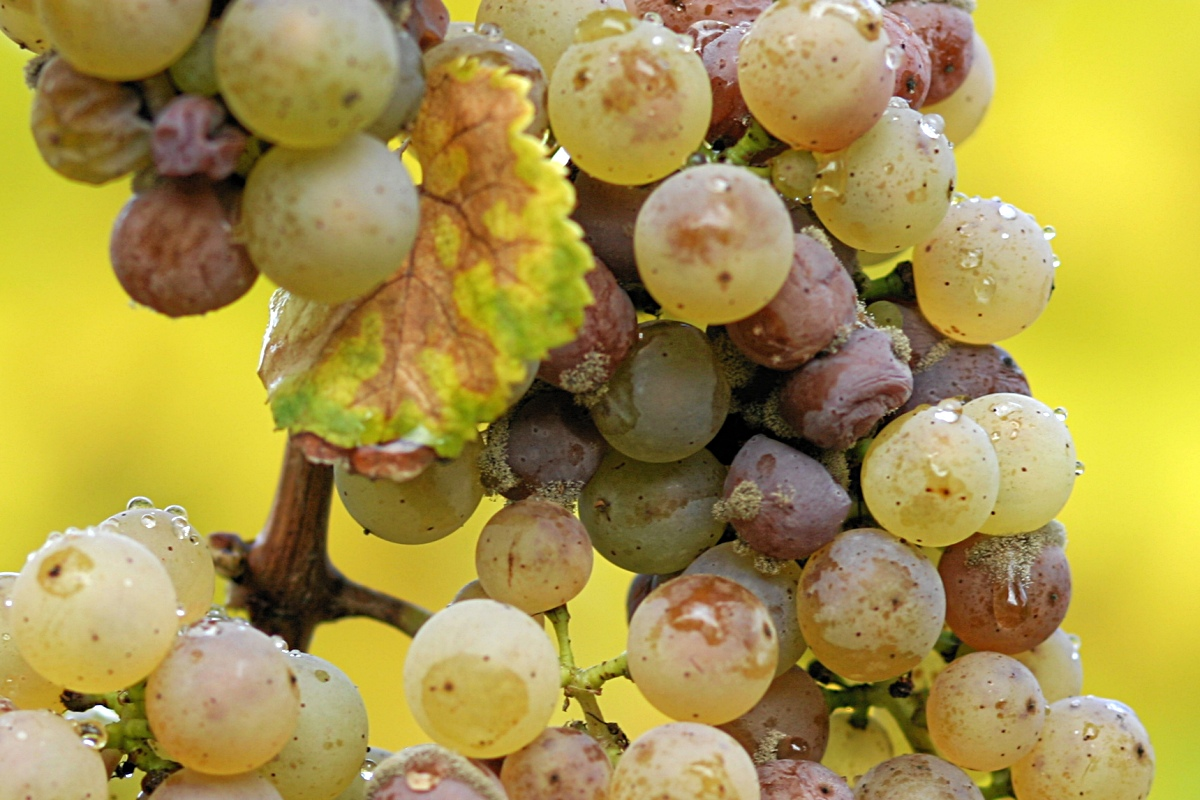
Riesling grapes with noble rot

The primary distinction between botrytized wines and other non-fortified sweet wines, such as late-harvest wines, ice wines (eiswein), or straw wines, lies in the extensive range and richness of aroma compounds generated by Botrytis cinerea fungal infection of the grapes. Significant differences are also evident in other components, like glycerol and acid composition, due to microbial activity. Descriptors frequently used for these wines highlight flavours of peach, apricot, pear, quince, raisin, and honey, along with unique "botrytis" or roti characteristics. Additionally, a notable feature of botrytized wines is their high acid content, which prevents them from tasting cloying, even with sugar levels often exceeding 200 g/l

Some of the most famous dessert wines, such as Tokaji Aszú of Tokaj-Hegyalja in Hungary, Château d'Yquem of Sauternes, and Seewinkel of Austria, are made using grapes mouldy with Botrytis cinerea, which sucks water out of the grape whilst imparting flavours of honey and apricot to the future wine.

The fungus requires specific conditions to produce noble rot; if it is too damp, the same fungus causes destructive grey rot. Vignerons endeavour to maximise the amount of noble rot without losing the whole crop to grey rot. Typically, noble rot forms best in conditions with regular morning mist, normally from a nearby lake or the sea. The wait for noble rot to form means these wines are usually harvested late.

The first noble rot wines were likely created by accident—both the Hungarians and the Germans have similar stories of how the harvest was delayed for some reason, but the mouldy grapes were vinified anyway and then found to be delicious. Given that propensity to noble rot was a factor in Hungarian vineyard demarcations some 50 years before a messenger was supposedly mugged on his way to Schloss Johannisberg in Germany and aszú inventory predates it by about 200 years, Hungary's Tokaj is where it was first produced. Germany may have later discovered the same process independently.

Noble rot is responsible for many other dessert wines, including Beerenauslese and Trockenbeerenauslese (TBA) of the German wine classification, French Monbazillac, Austrian Beerenauslese, Ausbruch and other TBA-type wines from all over the world.

== Serving ==
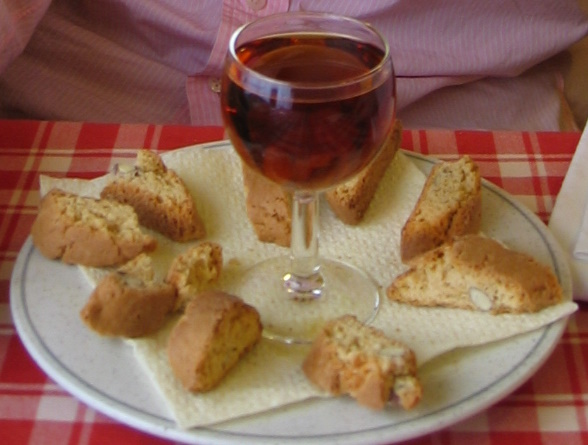
Vin Santo with almond biscuits

A general rule is that the wine should be sweeter than the food it is served with—a perfectly ripe peach has been described as the ideal partner for many dessert wines, whereas it makes sense not to drink wine at all with many chocolate- and toffee-based dishes. Red dessert wines like Recioto della Valpolicella and fortified wines like the vin doux naturel Muscats are the best matches for such difficult-to-pair desserts.

Alternatively, the wine itself can be a dessert, but bakery sweets can make a good match, particularly with a little bitterness like biscuits that are dunked in Vin Santo. A development of this matching of contrasts is a rich savoury dish like the foie gras that is a traditional partner to Sauternes.

White dessert wines are generally served somewhat chilled, but can be easily served too cold. Red dessert wines are served at room temperature or slightly chilled.
