= Trockenbeerenauslese =

German or Austrian dessert wine

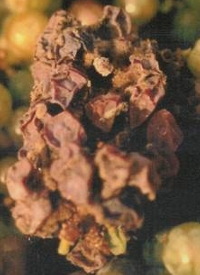
Botrytized grape cluster

Trockenbeerenauslese (German: [ˈtʁɔkn̩beːʁənˌʔaʊ̯sleːzə], lit. 'dried berry selection'), or TBA, is a German or Austrian botrytized wine made entirely from the individually selected grapes fully "dried" from Botrytis cinerea ("noble rot"), hence the name. Trockenbeerenauslese is a very sweet wine, highest among the wines of the QmP ("quality wine with distinction") category that includes also Auslese and Beerenauslese.

== Vintage ==
The grapes for TBA are individually picked among shrivelled with noble rot, often to the point of appearing like a raisin. The shrivelling might causes the content to become concentrated, very sweet and have an intensely rich flavour, frequently with a lot of caramel and honey bouquet, stone fruit notes such as apricot, and distinctive aroma of the noble rot. The finest examples are made from the Riesling grape, as this variety retains plenty of acidity even at the extreme ripeness, and therefore age well. Other grape varieties can benefit from noble rot, such as Sauvignon Blanc and Sémillon.

The TBA wines are very rare. The best of them are among the sweetest (up to 300 grams/liter) and most expensive dessert wines, often with low alcohol content (6–8% ABV). The high cost is caused by multiple factors:

- the onset of Botrytis is unpredictable, highly dependent on weather and location (down to an individual cluster of grapes);
- the pickers therefore have to go through the vineyards multiple times, cherry-picking clusters and sometimes individual grapes.

The very specific climatic conditions (which do not necessarily occur every year) are required to create botrytized grapes. They are usually golden to deep golden in color, sometimes even dark caramel. The body is viscous, very thick and concentrated, and arguably can be aged almost indefinitely due to the preservative powers of its high sugar content. Like other botrytized wines, the finest TBAs, despite very high sugar content, are far from being cloying due to a high level of acidity.

== Austria ==
Austria, once known for its Ausbruch, have adopted the German wine specifications, so Trockenbeerenauslese have also been in common production since the 1960s. Most TBA wines from Austria come from Neusiedlersee and Burgenland (actually, Neusiedlersee–Hügelland, an official wine region name that is rarely used), regions on both sides of Lake Neusiedl. East of the lake, the village of Illmitz is known for the production of "liquid gold". At the western side of the lake in Rust and St. Margarethen, wine of exceptionally good quality can be found. This region is known for its wide and shallow lakes which can lose more than half their volume due to evaporation. The mists created by these lakes provide a very conducive climate for noble rot to shrivel grapes.

The style is similar to, but much more concentrated than, Sélection de Grains Nobles from Alsace.

The wines are much more acidic compared to Sauternes (and similar to Tokaji), are considerably sweeter, have a lower alcoholic strength and are usually not matured in oak barrels.

As with most other premium grade dessert wines, Trockenbeerenauslese is to a large extent sold in half bottles of 375 ml.

== Requirements ==
The minimum must weight requirements for Trockenbeerenauslese is as follows:

- For Mosel-produced wine, at least 150 degrees on the Oechsle scale are required;
- In Austrian wine, 30 degrees KMW (approximately the same value).

The requirements are part of the wine law in both countries. Many producers, especially top-level producers, exceed the minimum requirements, resulting in richer and sweeter wines. In Germany it is common to add a golden capsule to indicate a superior wine. The sweetness of a TBA that just comes up to the minimum requirements may be 150 grams per liter, but in exceptional circumstances, the wines may contain more than 300 grams of sugar per liter and may approach the very rare Tokaji Eszencia in concentration.

== See also ==
- Ausbruch
- Eiswein

== Sources ==
- Teissedre, Pierre Louis; Donèche, Bernard (2013-04-14), "Botrytized Wines: Sauternes, German Wines", Sweet, Reinforced and Fortified Wines: Grape Biochemistry, Technology and Vinification, Wiley, doi:10.1002/9781118569184.ch19, ISBN 978-0-470-67224-2
- Brook, S. (2019). The wines of Austria. Infinite Ideas Limited. ISBN 978-1-910902-88-2.
- Magyar, Ildikó (2011). "Botrytized Wines". Advances in Food and Nutrition Research. Vol. 63. Elsevier. pp. 147–206. doi:10.1016/b978-0-12-384927-4.00006-3. ISBN 978-0-12-384927-4. ISSN 1043-4526. PMID 21867895.
