= Talento =

Type of Italian sparkling wines

Talento since 2004 is a wine term which exclusively refers to Italian sparkling wines vinified in the traditional method of in-bottle secondary fermentation and using only Chardonnay, Pinot Noir and Pinot Blanc grapes.

== See also ==
- Sekt
- Cava (disambiguation)
- Franciacorta
- Champagne
- Prosecco
- Moscato d'Asti
