= Moroccan wine =

Wine making in Morocco

Among the countries of North Africa, Morocco is considered to have the best natural potential for producing quality wines, due to its high mountains and the cooling influence of the Atlantic, as these factors offset the risk of having too hot vineyards. An important exporter of wine in the colonial era between 1912 and 1955, the Moroccan wine industry is experiencing a revival and expansion since the 1990s due to influx of foreign investments.

== History ==
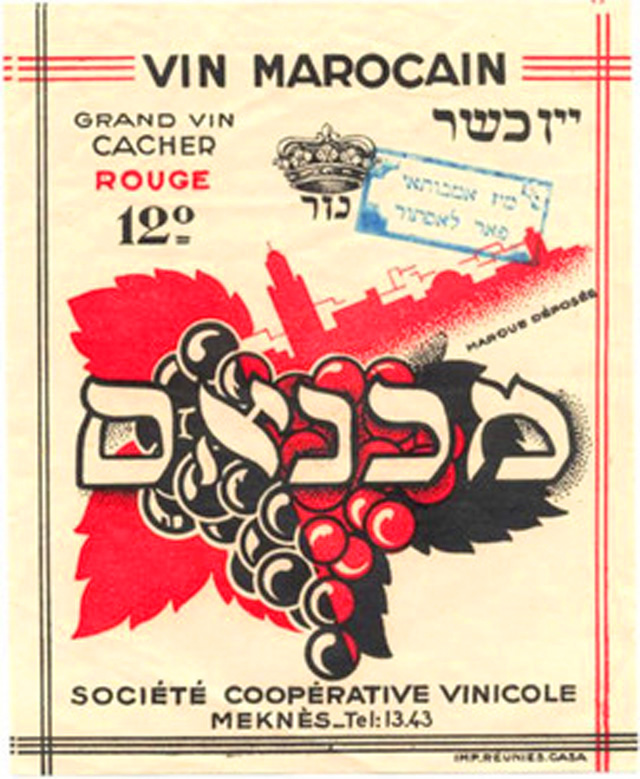
Moroccan wine Kasher 1930 – scan of old wine label

Viticulture in the region of today's Morocco is believed to have been introduced by Phoenician settlers, and was definitely established in the era of Ancient Rome. Large-scale viticulture was introduced into Morocco by French colonists, just as it was to the neighboring country of Algeria. However, the quantities of Moroccan wine produced was never nearly as high as that of Algerian wine. At the time of the country's independence in 1955, there was 55,000 hectares (140,000 acres). Although much of the French expertise left when Morocco became independent, the wine trade continued to be significant into the 1960s, until EEC introduced quotas in 1967 which led to significant reductions in the previous export to the EEC countries. Under a combination of restricted access to the traditional market, and competition from overproduction in other Mediterranean countries, much of the wine production became uneconomical, and a significant portion of Morocco's vineyards were grubbed up and replaced with other crops. In the period 1973–1984, the vast majority of the vineyards were also taken over by the Moroccan state. The state introduced measures such as fixed prices for grapes, irrespective of quality, which were not compatible with regaining competitiveness, and generally handled its vineyard very poorly. In the early 1990s, there were 40,000 hectares (99,000 acres) of vineyards in Morocco, of which 13,000 hectares (32,000 acres) were planted with vines for wine production (rather than for table grape or raisin production), and of these vineyards, more than half had old or diseased vines of low productivity.

In the 1990s, during the rule of Hassan II of Morocco, the Moroccan wine production started to improve due to foreign (primarily French) investment and know-how. This was achieved by offering foreign wine companies the possibility for long-term lease of vineyards from the state agricultural company SODEA. Several large Bordeaux-based wine companies, including Groupe Castel, William Pitters and Taillan, entered into such partnerships, which have been successful in reviving the Moroccan wine industry. As an example, the Castel brand Boulaouane was the best-selling foreign wine in France as of 2005, and the vineyard area had expanded to 50,000 hectares (120,000 acres) in the early 2000s. Some smaller investors, more oriented toward higher quality wines than the high-volume market, have later followed.

== Production and consumption ==
Wine production reached its peak under the French occupation with an output of more than 3 million hectoliters in the 1950s. After a major decline in the aftermath of the majority-Muslim nation's independence, interest and production began to revive and increase again, standing at about 400,000 hectolitres in 2013. Thus, Morocco has become the second biggest producer of wine in the Arab world, after Algeria. The industry employs up to 20,000 people. Most of the wine is consumed within the country, but better wines are exported as well, primarily to France.

Moroccan law does not prohibit the production of beer and alcohol, but only their sale to Muslim customers. Wine can be purchased in supermarkets and some restaurants, often those that cater to tourists and visitors. Alcohol is not generally available during Islamic holidays including Ramadan, except in some outlets aimed primarily at non-Muslims.

== Wine styles and grape varieties ==
Red wine dominates greatly, with over 75 per cent of production. Rosé wines and vin gris account for almost 20 per cent, and white wine for only around 3 per cent as of 2005.

The traditional red grapes planted in Morocco are Carignan (which once dominated), Cinsaut (almost 40 per cent in 2005), Alicante, and Grenache. Plantations of Cabernet Sauvignon, Merlot and Syrah have increased rapidly, and together make up around 15 per cent. Traditional white grape varieties include Clairette blanche and Muscat. There has also been smaller experimentation with Chardonnay, Chenin blanc and Sauvignon blanc, where there is a need to pick early to produce white wines with sufficient freshness.

Taferielt is an indigenous Moroccan wine, table, and raisin grape.

== Wine regions ==
Location of Morocco

Morocco is divided into five wine regions. Within these wine regions are a total of 14 areas with Appellation d'Origine Garantie (AOG) status. In 2001, a single Appelation d'Origine Contrôlée (AOC) was created, Côteaux de l'Atlas 1er cru ("Atlas hills"). In 2009, the first estate with a Château name, Château Roslane, was approved. The five wine regions, and their associated appellations, are:

- The Eastern Region:
  - Beni Sadden AOG
  - Berkane AOG
  - Angad AOG
- Meknès/Fès Region:
  - Guerrouane AOG
  - Beni M'tir AOG
  - Saiss AOG
  - Zerhoune AOG
  - Coteaux de l'Atlas 1er Cru
- The Northern Plain
  - Gharb AOG
- Rabat/Casablanca Region
  - Chellah AOG
  - Zemmour AOG
  - Zaër AOG
  - Zenatta AOG
  - Sahel AOG
- El-Jadida Region
  - Doukkala AOG

== See also ==
- Moroccan cuisine
- North African cuisine
- Arabic cuisine
- African cuisine
- Winemaking
