= Alfred Latour =

French painter

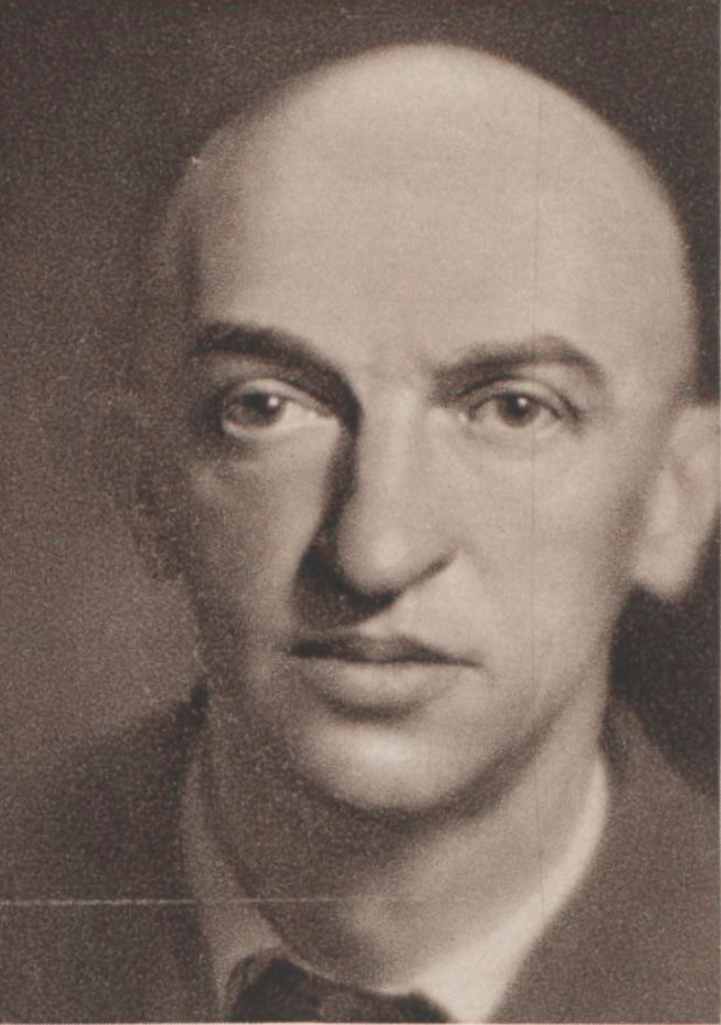
Alfred Latour Portrait

Alfred Latour (27 August 1888 – 2 March 1964) was a French painter and engraver who also worked extensively as a graphic designer and as an advertiser. He was notoriously against the opposition between so-called major and minor arts, and was passionate about all the expressive possibilities of visual arts, crafts, and modes of expression.

His work includes hundreds of oils, watercolours, drawings, illustrated books, advertisement posters, vignettes and printed fabrics, some of which are still produced by the Abbaye de Fontenay. All his works express both his sense of freedom and his rigorous seriousness. His Fauve palette is combined with essential lightness and simplicity of form. His works can be seen in museums in France (Paris, Lyon, Marseille, Arles, Martigues), in Great Britain (The British Museum and The Victoria and Albert Museum), and in National Library of the Netherlands. They are also part of many private art collections around the world.

Latour was always highly independent and reserved, and had no inclination to draw attention on himself. In 2004, the Alfred Latour Foundation was established in Fribourg, Switzerland. It is presided by Claude Latour, Alfred Latour's nephew, and is dedicated to preserving and promoting Alfred Latour's work.

== Biography ==
Alfred Latour was the youngest of four brothers; his father was a printer and typographer at the Imprimerie Nationale. He was born on 27 August 1888 in a working-class neighbourhood of the 12th arrondissement in Paris. From early childhood his love of drawing—his parents' slight resistance notwithstanding—marked him to become an artist.

His formation was very diverse. He started with evening classes in his neighbourhood, in Rue d'Aligre, and for a short time he was a student at the Ecole Nationale des Beaux-Arts. However, he was rapidly turned off by the academicism of the teaching. He preferred to spend his time in the National Museums of Paris where he took many notes and made many sketches and drawings. In 1908, he received a grant from the City of Paris to attend the Ecole des Arts Décoratifs. At that school he received a solid technical formation and trained his eye and his hand while searching for his own style. After he sold his first canvases, he went on a journey to the south of France, which proved to be a form of revelation whose enchantment would last all his life.

However, Latour was conscripted in 1909 and stationed in Granville, in Normandy. While on his leaves, he discovered the coast of Normandy and Brittany of which he produced many sketches and pochades: small sketches that captured the outline and colours of the landscape.

In 1913, he settled in Paris again, on the Ile Saint-Louis, which was still at the time a sort of village at the heart of the capital. He lived off the sale of canvases and drawings (mostly views of Paris and scenes of Parisian life), but also off set design for the theatre and graphic design patterns for household objects (boxes, plates, lamps and the like). That year, he presented his work for the first time at the Salon d'automne.

During that period, he started his work as a wood engraver. His professionalism, skilfulness and taste for meticulous and rigorous work quickly drew the recognition of his peers. The symbolist painter Émile Bernard, who was practically his neighbour, commissioned the engraving of his drawings illustrating Ronsard's Les Amours and Baudelaire's Les Fleurs du Mal, which Ambroise Vollard then published in 1914 and 1916.
With the start of World War I in 1914, Latour was mobilized, and on 22 September he was seriously wounded in Picardy. While convalescing in hospital he met Madeleine Cosnard who would become his wife in 1917 and the mother of his two sons, Jacques and Jean. During these war years Latour produced a large number of drawings and snapshot-like sketches of silhouetted comrades in their daily lives and of the landscapes he passed through.

After the war, he returned to the Ile Saint-Louis where he dedicated himself exclusively to perfecting his art as a woodcutter and graphic designer. His work clearly belonged to the French tradition, but he also radically renewed that tradition with his use of colours and his acute sense of simplicity in decoration. His talent did not go unnoticed; he started to exhibit his works regularly at the Salon d'Automne, at the Petit Palais, where he was the recipient of several prizes, and art patrons started to include him in their collections. In 1925, he was awarded the Grand Prix for book illustration at the Exposition Internationale des Arts Décoratifs. That same year, he created graphic and typographic vignettes for the Deberny and Peignot foundry. Latour's innovative idea was to create iterative motifs that could be combined ad infinitum like the letters of the alphabet; the motive would prove to be a commercial success for many years.

In 1927, he settled in Montparnasse, the hub of Paris artistic and intellectual life that attracted many painters, writers and musicians, many of whom were exiles. He became involved with the art book milieu, starting to work on bookbinding, embellishments and illustrations of more than thirty books. This work enabled him to become friends with many authors including poet Paul Valéry, novelist André Gide, and art historian André Focillon. It also led him to receiving several prizes in international exhibitions, which he shared with renowned artists such as Bonnard, Chagall, Degas, Dufy, Picasso, and Rouault. His modernist aesthetic and his sober and refined style also drew the attention of the Lyon silk manufacturers Maison Bianchini-Férier who commissioned him several designs for their exclusive fabrics.

He then turned to photography, and became the Paris correspondent of an international press agency. His favourite subjects were street scenes, fairs and the fishermen on the banks of the Seine. He captured these slices of life for the newspaper L'Ami du peuple with his quick look and his original sense of framing.
In 1932, he broke away from Parisian metropolitan life for which he had no affinity and bought a "mas" (a former sheep stable) in Eygalières at the foot of the Alpilles mountains. In the long-desired solitude of the Provence, he launched on a quest for renewed freedom; he gave up the constraints of woodcutting to devote himself freely to watercolours.

In 1934, he started to work for the wine merchant Nicolas. Their collaboration would last 30 years during which Latour produced much of the advertisement for the company, including posters and the yearly catalogue of fine wines, which artists such as Raoul Dufy, Van Dongen and Bernard Buffet had illustrated before him. On the other hand, when the printing house Draeger that produced the material for Nicolas offered Latour to become their Artistic Director, he turned down the offer saying: "I don't want a collar on my neck, albeit a golden one."

Latour always observed at a distance the vanguard artistic movements of his time. Between 1935 and 1936 he joined the UAM (the Union des Artistes Modernes) a movement founded in 1929 by architect Robert Mallet-Stevens in reaction to the academicism of the era and the established hierarchies between major and minor arts. Prominent members of the UAM included Le Corbusier, Pierre Jeanneret, Charlotte Perriand, Sonia Delaunay, Man Ray, Fernand Léger, Joan Miró and Walter Gropius. In the UAM pavilion of the 1937 Paris International Exposition, Latour presented works in three categories: Art Books and Illustration, Graphic Art, and Advertisement.

When the Second World War broke out, Latour was revolted by the armistice France signed with Germany, which he considered a humiliating capitulation. Ostensibly, he led a quiet life as a painter in Eygalières, returning to oil painting, which he had abandoned 20 years previously. At the age of 52, however, he decided to join his son Jacques who was fighting with the partisans of the French Résistance. In 1944, Jacques was arrested and deported to Dachau. He survived and became the curator of the Arles museums after the war. Latour managed to escape arrest thanks to an early warning and hid in Lyon in a hospital administered by a religious order. This forced retreat gave him time for reflection, meditation and produced in him a late awakening to religious faith.

In 1946, he bought another house on the rocky heights of Eygalières where he settled in two studios. One was devoted to his graphic work, while the other was the very private space he reserved for painting. The graphic work included the design of new fonts, page setting and illustrations that he worked on for the wine merchant Nicolas. He also started working with his friend Pierre Aynard, a silk manufacturer from Lyon and the owner of the Abbaye de Fontenay. He thus designed patterns for silk fabrics used in haute couture or in exclusive tapestries.

Latour kept following the developments of the arts in Paris from afar, but was irritated by the increasing influence of the art market. One day he packed up his canvases that were about to be exhibited at the Galerie de France: "How can painters be raised in stables like race horses?" And: "How can their work be sold like any old kind of stuff," Latour protested.
In his Provence retreat Latour thought of nothing but painting, though that did not keep him from cordially welcoming occasional visitors such as painter Mario Prassinos, actors Gérard Philippe and Nicolas Bataille, poet Henri Pichette and André Allix, the Rector of the University of Lyon. Upon the insistence of his friends he also agreed to participate in a few group exhibitions and in the newly created Salon de Mai. In 1953, he exceptionally agreed to lend his works to the Parisian Galerie Carmine for a personal exhibit that turned out to be quite a success. However, Latour only started to feel the pressing need to make his painting better known after 1962 when he started to become alarmed by his developing heart condition. He then showed his work at the Galerie La Calade, in Avignon, the Galerie Garibaldi in Marseille, as well as at the Salon d'Automne in Paris. In all cases the reviews were unanimously eulogistic.

Latour died in his studio in Eygalières after suffering a stroke on 4 March 1964 at the age of 76.

== Works ==
Latour was an explorer of art and he loved to venture into uncharted territories, meet new challenges and develop new techniques of visual expression. However, to him this diversity of approaches really meant searching for profound coherence. Whether it was in a landscape, in framing a photograph, etching a vignette, conceiving a poster for an ad or drawing a design for a fabric, he permanently rejected academicism, hackneyed tradition and ready-made solutions. He always showed his independence and resolutely refused to be enrolled in any school or movement. The history of these vanguards and their ideologies bore little relation to his personal history. Latour was certainly a Modernist, but not a diehard revolutionary artist: he sought to reinterpret the artistic tradition in the light of his own perception of the world and reach through it an ideal of essential simplicity.

=== Painting and drawing ===
At the Ecole des Arts Décoratifs, the teaching of painting was still very much under the influence of Impressionism. In 1908, however, Impressionism had lost most of its attraction; even Monet had left it behind to explore new forms. At the 1905 Salon d'Automne, Matisse and the other Fauvists scandalized the small world of art by totally freeing color, and in 1907 Picasso's Les Demoiselles d'Avignon ignited the controversy of the Cubism revolution and its ingenious deconstruction of space. Latour observed all this, but kept looking for a language of his own.
From his early sketches in Paris or in Normandy, Latour's technique had always been sure, self-reliant and fluid; he never sought to describe but rather to evoke with an innate sense of formal ellipsis and economy of means. His impressionist schooling gave him a feel for atmospheric skies, moving waters and intense ambiances that he produced through the supple strokes of his brush. From the start too he sought to push very far the simplification of forms, leaving details aside to attain comprehensible and vivid, though pared down, visions of the world.

His work is akin to visual haikus: the painting bears the somewhat hard trace of his brush; his drawings are "written" in hasty and tense ink gravid with allusion. Latour was a master of blacks and greys on bistre-coloured paper; with a few strokes he knew how to enhance the light on the paper and thus managed to convey the vastness and the energy of skies and sees in very small pieces. Even diminutive woodcuts, be they portraits or landscapes, bear the mark of his spirited style.
The encounter with the southern light of Provence in the 1930s and 1940s opened up his palette and enriched it with the solar hues of a tamed Fauvism. The colours of the works of that period are intense but much less burning than Matisse's, Derain's and Braque's pyrotechnics of the 1910s. From 1940, Latour returned to oil painting that he had abandoned 20 years before and developed a chromatist lyricism he had inherited from Fauvism] He also used this chromatic palette with bluish shadows that structure the arid and rocky landscapes he painted of Eygalières.
Latour's quest for formal freedom, for more light and simplicity, did not stop there. He was a man that kept going back indefatigably, almost obsessively, to his work. In the mid-1940s oil painting had the lion's share in Latour's production, which expressed the evident pleasure he must have had to paint. The post-war years were a new era for him, and in his increasingly free style pieces such as "The Banks of the Rhône", "Les Sainte-Maries de la Mer", and "Avignon" now consisted of solid surfaces of color, silhouetted shapes and stylized forms. The drawings too seem to have been made with one quick remorseless stroke and capture stenographically the laconic and expressive sparseness of the Alpilles or the Camargue.

Latour's quest for simplicity took him to the brim of abstraction, though he never made the final step. His work gradually evolved toward a poetic code that enabled him to evoke with a few lines and a few colour strokes a "Landscape in the Beaujolais", the contours of "Avignon", "Collioures", the mountains, the Alpilles, white clouds, rice fields, and "Tulips against a Red Backdrop". From the end of the 1940s to his last landscapes and bouquets, Latour flirted with geometry both rigorously and playfully. His geometric compositions are made of colour surfaces that his drawing lines—sometimes as fine as a pencil and sometimes as thick as brush stroke—cross freely. In these late works it is as if colour and form were autonomous; they are like two musical scores that respond to and echo each other in superimpositions, crossings and counterpoint.

The novelist Henri Feyt and the Director of Gallimard, Louis Evrard, tell the following anecdote: on a spring day of 1969, Picasso—who would never miss the Easter bullfight in Arles—noticed a painting on the wall of André's bookstore in that town. "Who is this by?" he asked. "Alfred Latour; he is dead now," was the storeowner's reply. "How come I never met him?" wondered the great Pablo.

=== Graphic work ===
Latour's graphic work may appear to be close to that of Raoul Dufy, not just because the two men were born and died exactly 11 years apart, but more importantly because like him he was a one-man band of visual arts. He was an artist who mastered (almost) all techniques and languages of pictorial representation: he was a painter and a drawer, of course, but also a wood engraver, a publicist, a font designer, a bookbinder, an illustrator, a set designer, a graphic designer for objects and fabric patterns, a tapestry designer and a photographer. Although painting was at the heart of his creation, the rest of his activities were not mere potboilers. The diversity of his activities was central to the UAM's (Union des Artistes Modernes) programme, the movement founded in 1929 by Robert Mallet-Stevens. Although he detested being enrolled in anything, Latour joined the movement in 1935-36 as a "graphic designer." Latour was thus close to Le Corbusier, Pierre Jeanneret, Charlotte Perriand, Sonia Delaunay, Man Ray, Cassandre, Jean Lurçat, Fernand Léger, Joan Miró and Walter Gropius, who all shared a distaste for the academicism of the era and the hierarchies between so-called major and minor arts.
Latour's father was a printer and a typographer. The son inherited a sense for good work and a permanent yearning for perfection from his father. Latour's graphic work has "secured him a choice place in the Golden Book of Print," said Roger Châtelain, a former Dean of the Lausanne Ecole Romande d'Art Graphiques (ERAG). Châtelain also underlined the very special place Latour occupies in that book. As with painting, Latour never sought to make his graphic work part of the vanguard that was made up of the Russian Suprematists, the Dadaists, the Dutch of the De Stijl group and the German school of the Bauhaus.
In 1908, Austrian architect Adolph Loos had summed up the extreme rigorousness of radical Modernists by declaring: "Ornament is a crime." Latour remained faithful to the French tradition he inherited from his father whose taste, in particular for ornament, was resolutely old-fashioned in comparison with the Modernism of the time. Latour's first woodcuts for book illustrations—head letters, frontispieces, ex libris, views of Paris, landscapes and still lives—show Latour was still very much influenced by the French tradition, though they also show his tendency to simplification and graphic effectiveness. The same can be observed in his early illustrated books with works by Charles Baudelaire, Jean-Jacques Rousseau and Henri Focillon. Soon, however, Latour's graphic work took a sharp modern turn, in particular in his posters, his ads for the newspapers, his surprisingly simple and purified bookbinding design and his inventively simple fabric designs. All these creations bear witness to his tasteful use of colour and the refined rigorousness with which he introduced combinations and variations on playful geometry and sparse composition.

=== Photography ===
Camera in hand, Latour immediately demonstrated he had a photographer's eye. He did not leave an extensive photographic output, but it is of high quality. Latour was the correspondent of a press agency, but his work is not so much documentary as poetic. He seized in black and white shards of life and of the world, minuscule evanescent events of everyday life that his camera arrested in flight. His subjects include pedestrians crossing a street viewed from below knee level, a motorcycle hoisted aboard a ship that seems to be flying through the air, or a fisherman whose amiable smile appears to be squeezed between his Gallic moustache and the beret jammed on his head. He also captured passers-by that look like Lilliputians in front of a giant advertisement for the Galeries Lafayette, people seen from the back as they are looking from a bridge on the Seine which is not visible in the picture, or an odd and playful accumulation of pipes, wigs, hot-water bottles in a store window. Latour was artistic kin to other street poets like Robert Doisneau, Willy Ronis and Edouard Boubat. His keen and mobile eye sought new angles, from above or from below: a bird's-eye view of a bottle of wine and a slice of bread transforms the latter into an original still life. He could focus on a detail and find delight in almost nothing. He would frame precisely and only what he was interested in, even if that meant cutting heads, leaving out the second wheel of a bicycle, or use the windshield of a car as a frame within the frame.

== Selected works ==
=== Painting and drawing ===
- 1910: Grandville, drawing, ink and pencil, 11,5 x 17,5 cm.
- 1913: The Woods, woodcut, 13 x 18 cm.
- 1916: War Sketch, ink, 10,4 x 16,2 cm.
- 1936: Mas in the Alpilles, watercolor, 29 x 43 cm.
- 1941: Eygalières, oil on cardboard, 33 x 41 cm.
- 1945: Avignon, oil on paper, 50 x 65 cm.
- 1948: Landscape of the Beaujolais, oil on canvas, 73 x 92 cm.
- 1954: The Alpilles and White Clouds, oil on canvas, 115 x 146 cm.
- 1957: Tulips on Red Backdrop, oil on canvas, 65 x 50 cm.

=== Graphic work ===
- 1920: Henri Focillon, L'île oubliée ("The Forgotten Island"), illustrated book, woodcut, 11 x 9 cm, (1 picture).
- 1928: Charles Baudelaire, The Flowers of Evil, frontispiece, Illustrated book, woodcut, 12 x 8 cm.
- c. 1960: Nicolas Wines: Advertisement poster, 300 x 500 cm.
- 1929: Les Coquillages ("Shells"), graphic design on fabric, (printed Tournon fabric), 31 x 28 cm.
- 1948: design for fabric, 49 x 64 cm.

=== Photography ===
From the Catalogue of Latour's Works, nt., nd.

- P. 9 : The Wigmaker's Shop Window (c. 1936).
- P. 14: Photo journalism: Sleepers on a Bench (c. 1936).
- pp. 16–17: Passers-By (c. 1936).
- pp. 22–23: Portrait of a Fisherman and Sill Life (c. 1936).
- P. 27: The Flying Motorcycle (c. 1932).

== Main distinctions and exhibitions ==
- 1913: Paris Salon d'Automne. Latour exhibited his works regularly at the Autumn Salon and was the recipient of several prizes.
- 1925: Grand Prix of the Book Section at the Paris International Exposition of Modern Industrial and Decorative Arts (Exposition internationale des Arts Décoratifs).
- 1925: 2nd International Book Exposition (Seconda Fiera internazionale del Libro) Florence, Italy.
- 1931: International Art Book Exposition (Exposition internationale du Livre d'Art) at Le Petit-Palais, Paris.
- 1932: Exhibition of the most beautiful French art books in 20 years; Museums of Decorative Arts in Copenhagen, Goteborg, Oslo and Stockholm.
- 1932: Bookshop and Gallery La Tortue, Paris.
- 1937: Greatorex' Galleries, London.
- 1937: International Exposition "Arts and Techniques of Modern Life," Paris.
- 1951 and 1953: Salon de Mai (May Salon).
- 1952: Gummessons Konstgalleri AB, Stockholm.
- 1953: Carmine Gallery, Paris.
- 1954: Durand-Ruel Gallery, Paris.
- 1955: 9th Lissone Prize (IX Premio Lissone), Italy.
- 1962: La Calade Gallery, Avignon.
- 1962: Garibaldi Gallery, Marseille.

== Illustrated books—woodcuts ==
- 1920: Henri Focillon : L'ìle oubliée ("The Forgotten Island"), Paris: Léon Pichon.
- 1926: Paul Valéry: Variety. Illustrations and portrait of Paul Valéry. Paris: Claude Aveline.
- 1926: Oscar Wilde, De Profundis. Paris: S. Kra.
- 1928: Paul Claudel, Partage de Midi. Ed. Paris: Les Cent Une, Société des femmes bibliophiles.
- 1928: André Gide, Le voyage d'Urien (Urien's Travels). Maastricht, Luxemburg, A.A.M. Stols and The Halcyon Press.
- 1930: Blaise Cendrars, Comment les Blancs sont d'anciens Noirs ("How the Whites Used to Be Black"). Paris: Au Sans Pareil.
- 1930: Pierre Corneille: Polyeucte martyr ("Polyeuctus the Martyr"). Paris: Edouard Pelletan Helleu et Sergent.

== Selected bibliography ==
- Louis Martin-Chauffier, Plaisir du Bibliophile, N° 17, 1929.
- Henri Jonquières, "Alfred Latour: The Painter-Typographer." Caractère. Special Christmas issue, 1953.
- Henri Focillon, "Color Woodcuts and Prints." Arts et Métiers Graphiques, N° 29, 1953.

See also newspapers reviews.
