= Frédérique Charlaix =

French artist (1883–1939)

Marguerite Frédérique Charlaix
- Born: Saint-Étienne
- Known for: Paintings

Marguerite Frédérique Charlaix (1883-1939) was a French painter from the École de Lyon who specialised in landscapes and still lifes. She was the daughter of painter Léon Charlaix.

Charlaix moved to Lyon in 1900 to study with Jean-Louis Loubet (1841-1903), (Note: A student of the Beaux-Arts in Lyon and Paris where he was a student of Charles Gleyre (1806–1874).) the painter, enamelist and sculptor Robert Barriot (1898-1970) and painter Pierre Bonnaud (1865-1930).

She exhibited at the Société Lyonnaise de Beaux-Arts. (Note: Created in 1887 when the Société des amis des arts de Lyon and the Société des artistes lyonnais merged) In 1902 she was a founding member of the Salon d'automne de Lyon where she became an exhibitor too. In 1904 she started exhibiting at the Société des Artistes Indépendants, and in 1921 at the Salon d'Automne, in Paris. In 1933 she sent her works to the Salon du Sud-Est, which she also helped found.

In 1932 she illustrated "La masque de Lyon" (Note: The editors were Saint-Félicien-en-Vivarais, Au Pigeonnier, 1932) by Cabanes. In 1937 "Dame Loyse, la Belle Cordière" by Joseph Trillat.

When she died in 1939 a rare book titled "12 bois gravés de Frédérique Charlaix" was published. It includes an introduction by Henri Focillon (1888-1943), an art historian who was the director of the Museum of Fine Arts of Lyon.
