= Algerian wine =

Wine making in Algeria

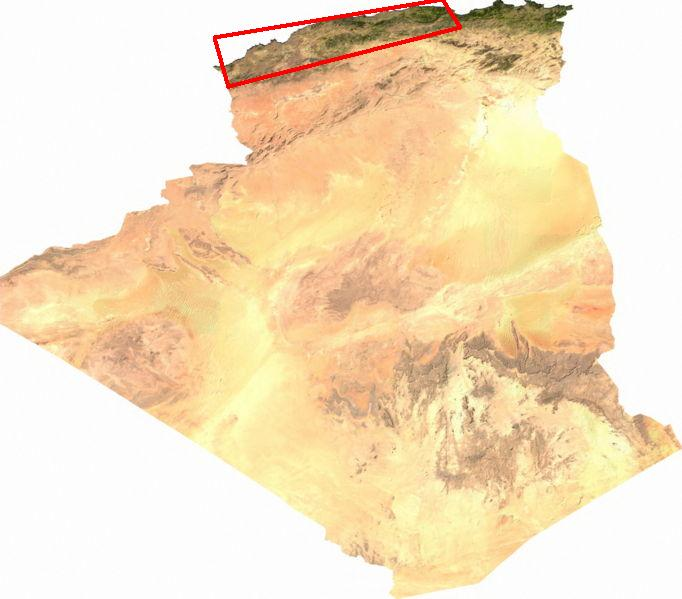
Location (in red box) of Algeria's main wine producing areas.

Location of Algeria

Algerian wine is wine cultivated and bottled in Algeria. It has played an important role in the history of wine. Algeria's viticultural history dates back to its settlement by the Phoenicians and continued under the Roman Empire. Prior to the Algerian War of Independence (1954–1962), Algeria was the largest wine exporter in the world, accounting for nearly two-thirds of the total international wine trade.

Algeria has a long history of wine production dating back to the Roman era. During the late 19th century, Algeria's wine production peaked and it became the largest wine-producing country in the world, with an annual production of over 3 billion liters of wine. At the time, Algeria was a French colony and much of the wine produced in Algeria was exported to France to be used for blending with French wines.

Most Algerian wine production takes place in the regions of Mascara, Mostaganem, and Tiaret, which are located in the northwest of the country. The most commonly grown grape varieties in Algeria include Carignan, Grenache, Cinsault, and Alicante Bouschet, which are used to produce both red and rosé wines.

Algerian wines are known for their deep color, rich aroma, and full-bodied flavor. The climate and soil in Algeria are well-suited for grape cultivation, with warm, sunny summers and mild winters. In 2019, Algeria produced approximately 500,000 hectoliters of wine, making it one of the largest wine-producing countries in Africa. Most of this wine is exported to other countries, including France, Italy, and Spain, where it is used for blending and sold under other labels.

Despite the challenges facing the Algerian wine industry, there is a growing interest in producing higher quality wines and promoting Algerian wine as a unique and distinct product. Some producers are experimenting with new grape varieties and modern winemaking techniques, while others are focusing on marketing their wines to a domestic audience. As a result, there may be potential for growth and innovation in Algerian wine production in the future.

== History ==
The roots of Algerian winemaking can be traced to the settlement of the Phoenicians and the influences of nearby Carthage. Under Roman rule, winemaking continued until its decline after the Muslim conquest of North Africa in the 7th and 8th centuries. During this time the wine industry was severely limited due to the prohibition of alcohol under Islamic dietary laws. When Algeria came under French rule in 1830 vineyards were replanted to serve the needs of the local pieds-noir. When the phylloxera epidemic destroyed the French vineyards in the mid-19th century, Algerian wine exports into France filled the void. An influx of winemakers from the German wine region of Baden brought with them more modern winemaking techniques and helped to increase the overall quality of Algerian wine. Even after the French resumed normal levels of wine production, Algerian wine was still widely used in regions like the Languedoc as a blending component that added color and strength to the wines.

From 1854 to 1915, wine production grew from 25K hectoliters to 10 million hectoliters. Starting in the 1880s, the price of French wines started to decrease, leading the wine industry to lobby in favor of restricted imports and higher quality standards. During World War I, the phylloxera epidemic reached Algerian vines. In 1935, appellations were introduced to protect regional production and ensure that Algerian wine was not being sold as a French product, which was often the case.

The high point of the Algerian wine industry came in the late 1930s when over 4,000 square kilometres (1,500 sq mi) was producing more 2,100 megalitres (550,000,000 US gal) of wine. By the 1950s, together with Tunisia and Morocco, Algerian wine accounted for nearly two-thirds of the wine that was internationally traded. To a large extent, Algerian red wine was used for blending with red wine from the south of France, since Algerian wine was deeper in colour and higher in alcohol than the French wines produced from Aramon grapes. The dominant grape variety in Algeria at this time was Carignan, which only overtook Aramon in southern France in the 1960s.

By 1961, Algeria was the fourth producer of wine worldwide after France, Italy and Spain.

By the time of Algerian independence in 1962, over a dozen areas were granted Vin Délimité de Qualité Superieure (VDQS) status by the French. Following independence, the wine industry was hard hit by the loss of the French settlers and the French army who provided a sizable domestic market for the wine. France also greatly reduced the amount of exports it was accepting (39 million hectolitres from 1964 to 1969), forcing Algerian wineries to look elsewhere for a market. In 1969, the Soviet Union agreed to buy 500 megalitres (130,000,000 US gal) a year till 1975 at prices far below market value for the wines. Many Algerian government officials thought it was inappropriate for an Islamic country to be so economically dependent on alcohol production and encouraged vineyard owners to convert their land into other agricultural crops such as cereal or table grapes. Urban expansion in areas such as the fertile Mitidja plain behind Algiers further reduced the number of vineyards in Algeria. At the turn of the 21st century, efforts were underway to revive the Algerian wine industry but so far very little Algerian wine is on the international market.

== Climate and wine regions ==
All of Algeria's vineyards are located in the Hauts Plateaux region extending towards the Moroccan border. Bordering the sea, this region has a typical Mediterranean climate with mild winters and dry, hot summers and is very similar to the southern wine regions of Spain. Rainfall averages around 600 millimetres (24 in) in the regions east of Algiers to 400 millimetres (16 in) in the western regions closer to Morocco. The main wine producing areas are located in the provinces of Aïn Témouchent, Mascara, Mostaganem, Sidi Bel Abbès and Tlemcen. Algeria's Office National de Commercialisation des Produits Viti-vinicoles (ONCV) list seven quality wine production zones that may appear on Algerian wine labels.

- Coteaux de Tlemcen
- Monts du Tessalah
- Coteaux de Mascara
- Dahra hills
- Coteaux du Zaccar
- Médéa
- Aïn Bessem Bouira

== Grapes and wine ==
During the peak of Algerian wine production, the main grapes of the region was Carignan, Cinsaut and Alicante Bouschet. Despite not having Pinot noir or otherwise resembling Burgundian wine, blends of these grapes were often mislabeled as burgundy. In recent times, Clairette blanche and Ugni blanc have become the dominant grape varieties with some smaller plantings of Cabernet Sauvignon, Chardonnay, Merlot, Mourvèdre and Syrah. Algerian wines are characterized by their overripe fruit, high alcohol and low acidity. The grapes often go through a short fermentation process and are bottled after little to no oak aging.

== See also ==
- Sidi Brahim
- Winemaking
- Algerian cuisine
- African cuisine
- Agriculture in Algeria
