= Sidi Brahim (wine) =

Wine brand

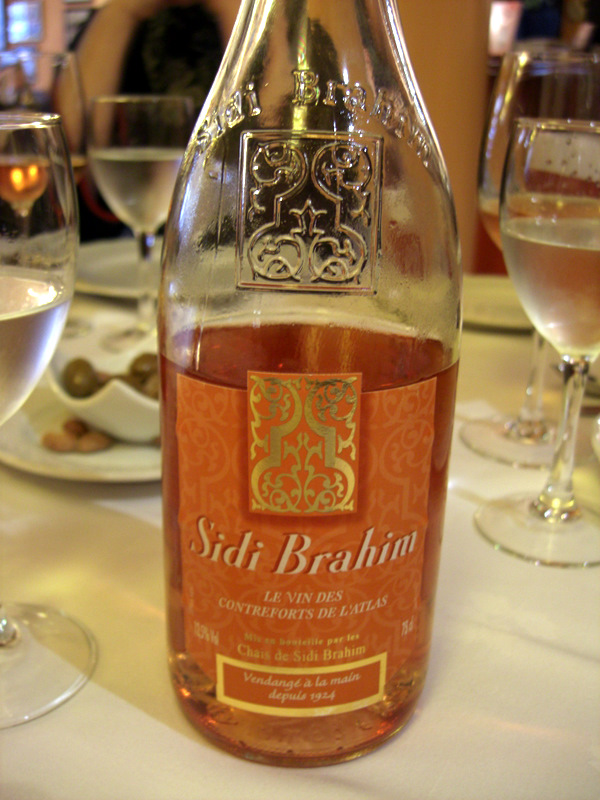
A Sidi Brahim rosé

Sidi Brahim is a range of branded wines produced in the Atlas Mountains, first in Algeria, then in Morocco and now in Tunisia. The wines are blended and bottled or filled into bag-in-boxes in France, and are primarily sold there. It was the second-best selling foreign wine in France, behind Boulaouane (also a Castel brand), as of 2005. The production volume is around three million bottles annually. The wine has been named after the Battle of Sidi-Brahim (1845).

The brand is currently owned by Groupe Castel, which acquired it (and Malesan) in 2003 from William Pitters, a company founded by Bernard Magrez. Magrez/Pitters in turn bought it in 1982. The label of the red wine bottle states that it is "harvested by hand since 1924".

The grape composition of Sidi Brahim and the range of wines offered has varied throughout the years, but in 2010 the composition is indicated as the following:

- Red wine: Cabernet Sauvignon (50%), Syrah (30%), and Merlot (20%).
- Rosé wine: Cinsault (40%) and Grenache gris (60%).
- White wine: Chardonnay (100%).

The blend of the red wine has previously included traditional grown varieties of North Africa (which it used to share with Languedoc-Roussillon), such as Alicante, Aramon, Carignan, Cinsault, and Grenache. The current composition is more "New World-like".

== See also ==
- Algerian wine
