= Pierre Castel =

French businessman (born 1926)

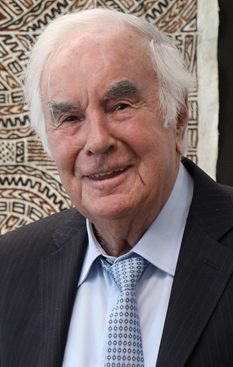
- Castel in 2019
- Born: Jesus Sebastian Castel; 17 October 1926 (age 100); Berson, Gironde, France
- Occupation: Businessman
- Years active: 1947–present
- Known for: Founder of Castel Group

Pierre Jesus Sebastian Castel (born 17 October 1926) is a French billionaire businessman, best known as the founder of the Castel Group, one of Europe's largest wine producers and a major player in the global beverages industry. Under his leadership, the group expanded from a family-owned Bordeaux wine business into an international conglomerate active in wine, beer, and soft drinks, with a particularly strong presence in Africa and Europe.

== Early life ==
Pierre Castel was born Jesus Sebastian Castel on 17 October 1926 in Berson, near Bordeaux. He was the sixth of nine children in a family of Spanish agricultural workers who had emigrated to France in 1914. His parents settled in the vineyards of Bourg-sur-Gironde, where Castel began working at the age of twelve.

In 1947, at the age of nineteen, he established a small wine trading business that supplied local grocers and wine merchants in the Bordeaux region. In 1949, he and his eight siblings formally founded Castel Frères, which later became the Castel Group.

== Career ==
Castel is CEO and president of Patriarche, and the president of Cassiopée Limited, which has a global presence in the beverage industry. He is also the founder and president of Castel-Frères, with roots in the wine and spirits sector. He has been involved in the beverage industry for over 60 years, specializing in breweries, wineries, and carbonated drinks.

One of the keys to Castel Group's success is its vertically integrated business model, which encompasses everything from vineyard ownership and wine production to distribution and retail.

According to Forbes, Castel and his family had a net worth of $15.6 billion as of November 2019. They are listed at number 125 on Forbes' list of global billionaires, and ranked the 6th richest in France.

He has been named in the Pandora Papers.

== Personal life ==
Castel is married and lives in Geneva, Switzerland. He turned 100 on 17 October 2026.
