= Cleanskin =

Cleanskin may refer to:

- Cleanskin (animal) or maverick, an unbranded range animal
- Cleanskin (film), a 2012 British terrorist thriller starring Sean Bean and Charlotte Rampling
- Cleanskin (security), an undercover operative unknown to his or her targets, or a terrorist unknown to national security services
- Cleanskin (wine), unbranded wine
- Cleanskin, an album by Brian Cadd
- "Clean Skin", an episode of the television drama Homeland
