= Malesan =

Bordeaux wine brand

Malesan is a Bordeaux wine brand owned by Groupe Castel. It is produced as a red, rosé and white wine. Malesan was originally owned by Bernard Magrez, and was bought by Castel in 2003.

In 2007, at 1.06 million cases (12.7 million bottles), Malesan was the second most selling Bordeaux brand behind Mouton Cadet.
