= Bernard Magrez =

French wine magnate (born 1936)

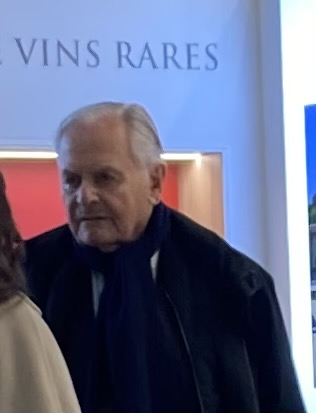
- Bernard Magrez
- Born: 1936 (age 89–90)
- Occupation: wine magnate

Bernard Magrez (born 1936) is a French wine magnate who predominantly owns Bordeaux wine estates, including Château La Tour Carnet, Château Pape Clément, Château Fombrauge and Clos Haut-Peyraguey but also a large number of wine producing properties in other French wine regions and other countries, including Spain, Portugal, Chile, Argentina, Japan, Morocco and California. In 2017 it was confirmed that Magrez had bought Château Le Sartre in Bordeaux's Pessac-Léognan.

== Biography ==
A multi-millionaire, Magrez made his fortune as the founder of the William Pitters spirits company and the low-cost red Bordeaux brand Malesan and Sidi Brahim.

In December 2008 it was reported that the investment bank Lazard was offering Château Latour for sale, and Magrez was suggested as the likely buyer. In the July 2009 Decanter publication of "The Power List" ranking of the wine industry's individuals of influence, Magrez placed at number 29.

In 2012 expanded his Bordeaux holdings with Château Malleprat in Pessac-Léognan, Château Moulin d'Ulysse in Listrac-Médoc, and Clos Haut-Peyraguey, a classified growth in Sauternes.

Bernard Magrez is the sole owner of four classified growth chateaux located in the different prestigious Bordeaux Classified Appellations: Chateau Pape Clement in Graves, Chateau La Tour Carnet in Haut-Médoc, Chateau Fombrauge in St Emilion and Clos Haut-Peyraguey in Sauternes.
