= Wine label =

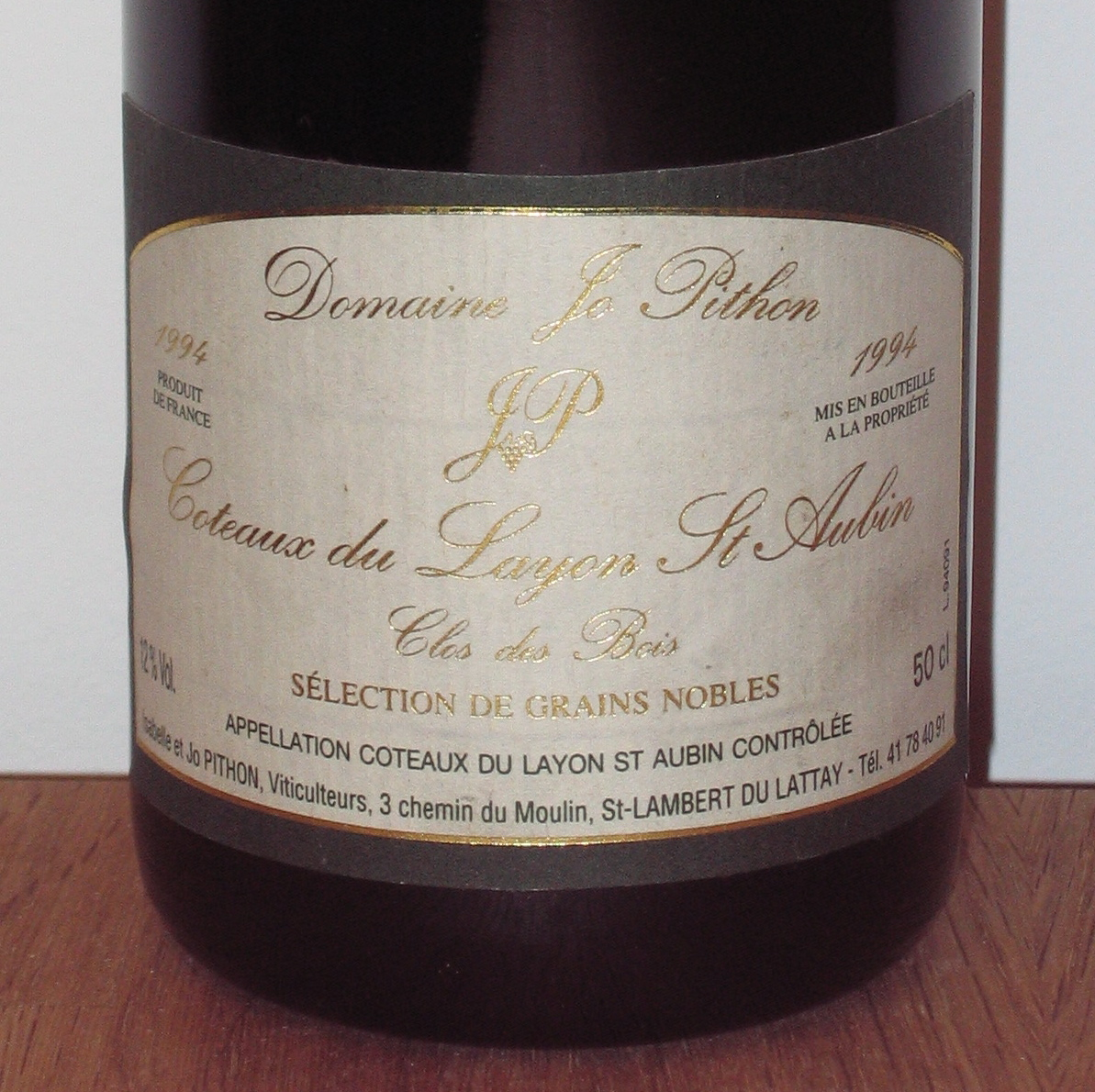
A bottle of wine from Coteaux du Layon: Clos des Bois Sélection de Grains Nobles 1994 by Jo Pithon

Wine labels are important sources of information for consumers since they tell the type and origin of the wine. The label is often the only resource a buyer has for evaluating the wine before purchasing it. Certain information is ordinarily included in the wine label, such as the country of origin, quality, type of wine, alcoholic degree, producer, bottler, or importer. In addition to these national labeling requirements producers may include their web site address and a QR Code with vintage specific information.

== Information provided ==
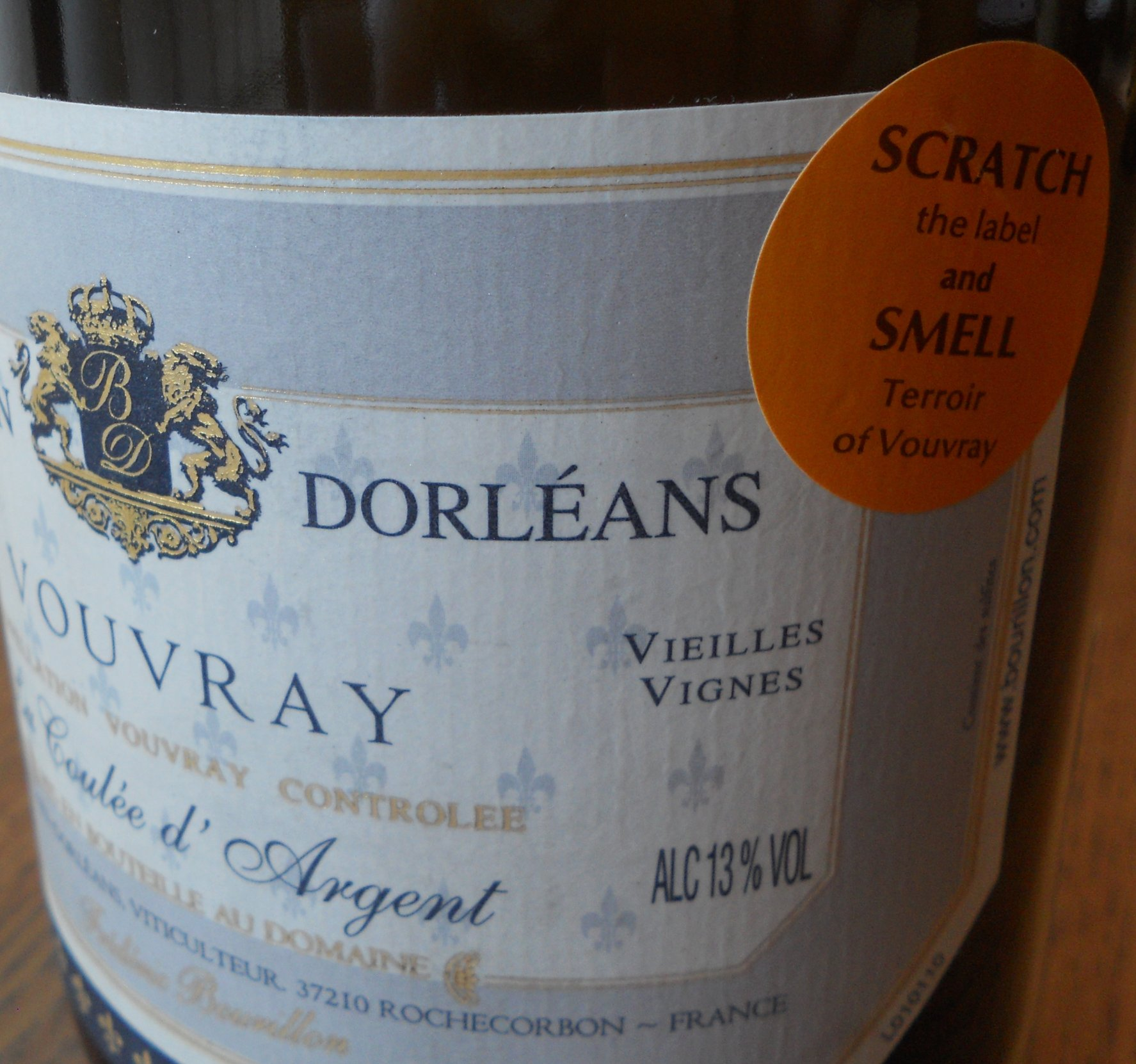
A wine label for a wine from Vouvray with a scratch and sniff sticker affixed to draw the consumer's attention.

=== Label design ===
Some wineries place great importance on the label design while others do not. There are wineries that have not changed their label's design in over 60 years, as in the case of Château Simone, while others hire designers every year to change it. Labels may include images of works by Picasso, Chagall, and other artists, and these may be collector's pieces. The elegance of the label does not determine the wine's quality. Instead, it is the information contained within the label that can provide consumers with such knowledge.

Most New World consumers, and increasingly European consumers, prefer to purchase wine with varietal labels and/or with brand name labels. A recent study of younger wine drinkers in the U.S. found that they perceived labels with châteaux on them to be stuffy or old-fashioned. Producers often attempt to make selecting and purchasing wine easy and non-intimidating by making their labels playful and inviting. The financial success of New World wine attributed to striking label designs has led some European producers to follow suit, as in the case of the redesign of Mouton Cadet.

=== Differences by country ===
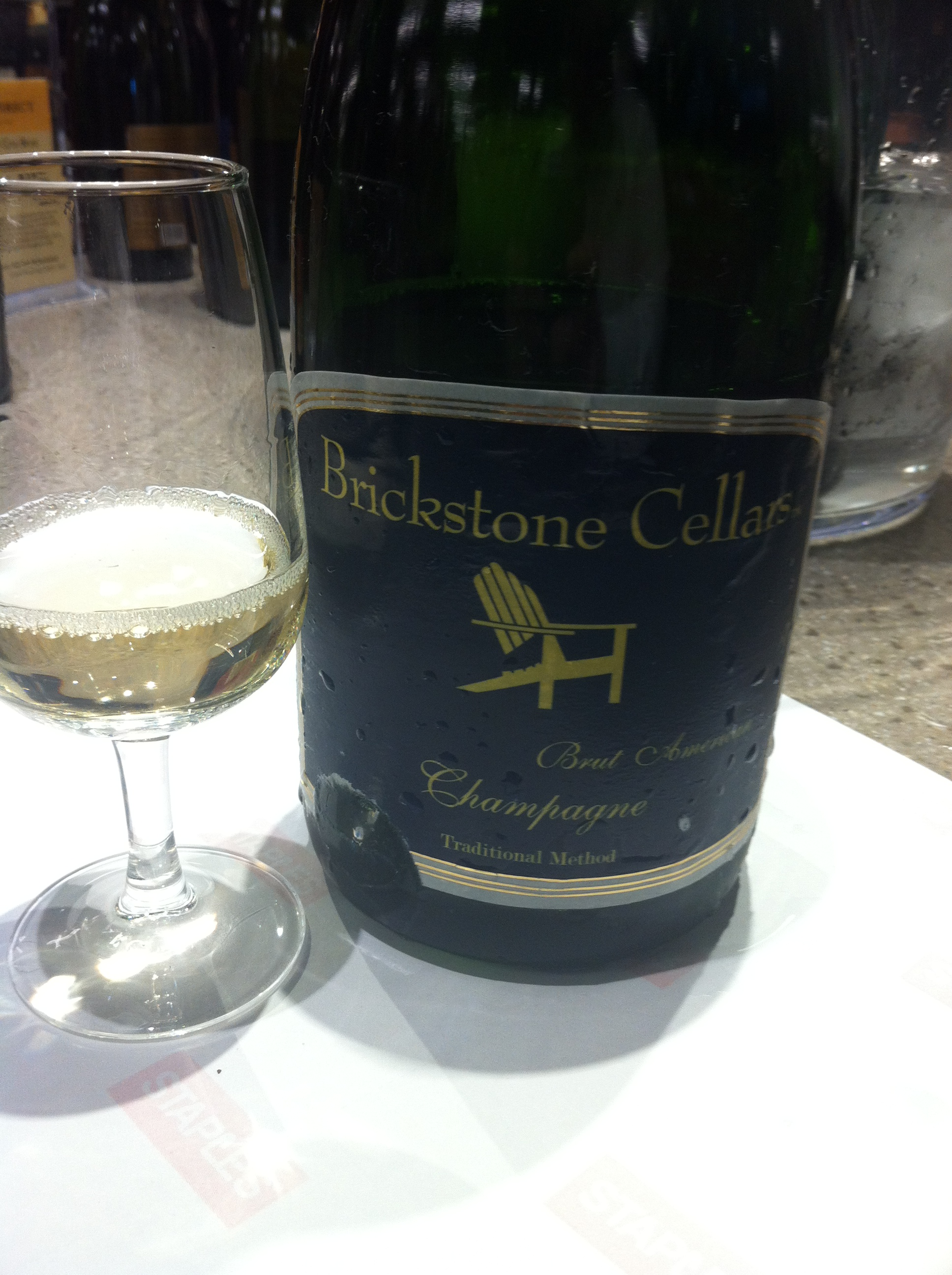
Sparkling wine from New York with a semi-generic usage of "Brut American champagne."

Wine classification systems differ by country. Wines can be classified by region and area only. For example, there are 151 châteaux in Bordeaux with "Figeac" and 22 estates in Burgundy with "Corton" on their labels. In Burgundy, there are 110 appellations in an area only one-fifth the size of Bordeaux. Complicating the system is the fact that it is common for villages to append the name of their most famous vineyard to that of the village.

In Spain and Portugal, the authenticity of the wine is guaranteed by a seal on the label or a band over the cork under the capsule. This is promulgated by the growers' association in each area.

German wine labels are particularly noted for the detail that they can provide in determining quality and style of the wine.

Almost every New World wine is labelled by grape variety and geographic origin. Semi-generic designations were once quite common in countries such as Australia and the US, but the wine authorities in areas such as Champagne have not been afraid to bring lawsuits against the use of their names outside their region, and semi-generic names are falling out of use.

Wines whose label does not indicate the name of the winery or the winemaker are referred to as "cleanskin" wine, particularly in Australia.

Degree of sweetness information is particularly inconsistent, with some countries' manufacturers always indicating it in standardized fashion in their language (brut, dolce, etc.), some traditionally not mentioning it at all or referring to it informally and vaguely in a rear-label description, and yet other countries' regulators requiring such information to be included (commonly on a secondary label) even when such information has to be added by the importer. In certain cases of conflicting regulations, a wine may, for example, even be labelled "sweet" by a manufacturer, but also "semi-sweet" (as per a different law) in the local language translation on a supplementary label mandated by the jurisdiction where it is sold.

=== Importance of labels in different types of wine ===
The information contained in labels is important to determine the quality of the wine. For example, great importance needs to be attached to vintage dates when there are differences in climate. The taste and quality of the wine can change from year to year depending on the climate. Knowing the vintage is specially important when buying fine wines because the quality of the wine can vary from year to year due to climatic differences. The quickest way to determine the quality of the year is to use a wine chart.

Vintage dates may not be important, for example, there are no vintage dates on bottles of sherry. On the other hand, wines may or may not have vintages. Champagne is usually a blend from more than one year and only sometimes sold as a vintage wine. Also, Port is only sold with a vintage in years of exceptional quality.

=== Bottler and importer information ===
A wine label may include the producer, the bottler and the merchant's names. The bottler's name must always be included in the label. The importer's name must be included in the label only for countries outside the Common Market. While it is not necessary for a wine to be bottled at its place of origin, it is obligatory for classed growth claret and vintage port to be bottled in Bordeaux and Porto. Also, bottling of Alsace must be done within the appellation. Thus, it is important to look for terms such as mis en bouteille au château or mis au domaine because they tell you the wine is estate bottled.

=== Misleading information ===
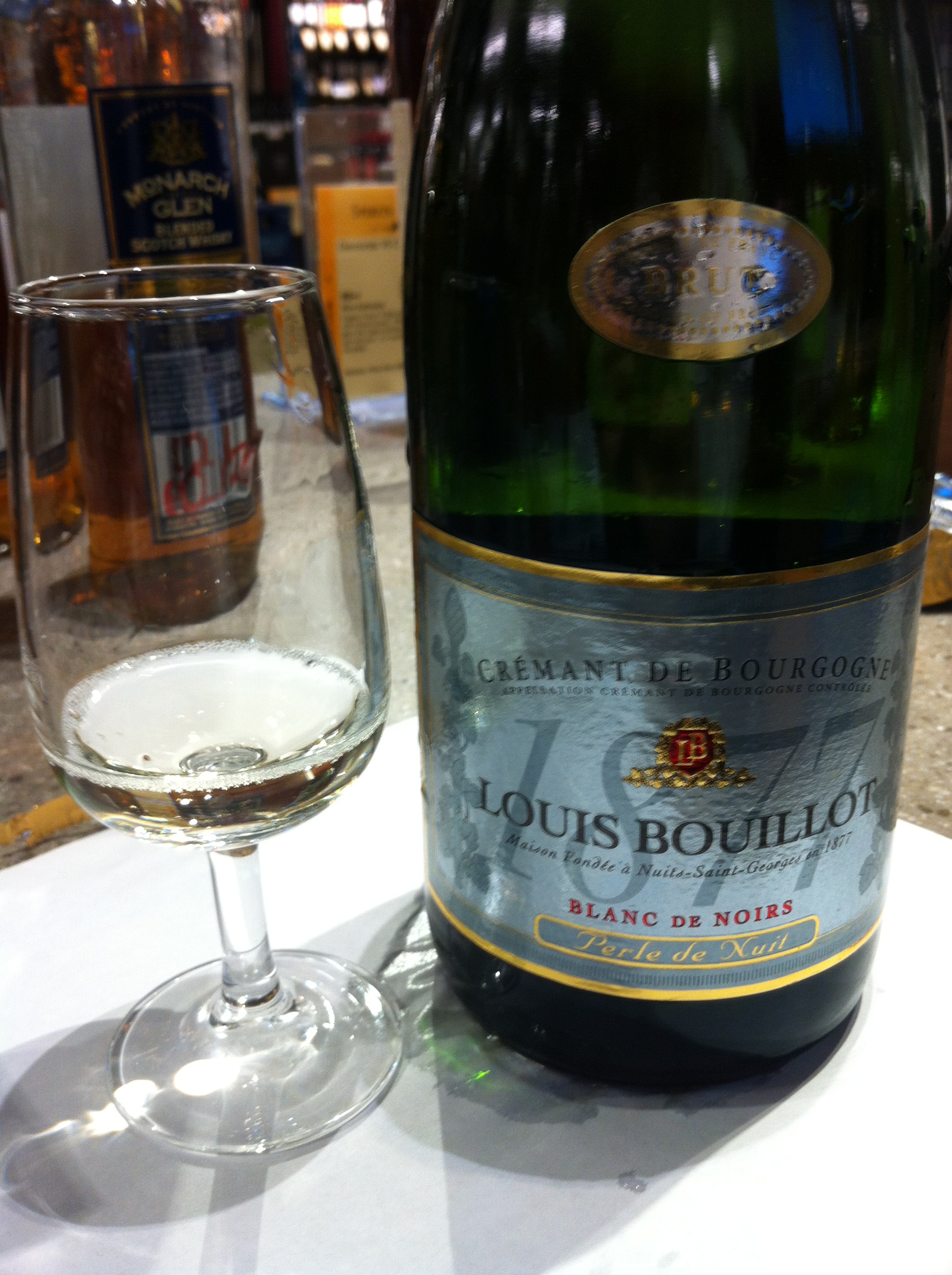
A blanc de noir sparkling wine made from the red Pinot noir and Gamay grapes.

Labels may include terms that may be perceived as misleading. The term Blanc de blancs may be included in a label. This term means "white wine made from white grapes". The fact is that white wines are predominantly made from white grapes, with the exception of many sparkling wines, the common use of the red Pinot noir in Champagne wines being a typical example.

Although the word château is most associated with Bordeaux, it does not mean that the wine does come from Bordeaux, and there may not be any kind of building – let alone a château – associated with the vineyard. The name château can even be included in wines from Australia or California. Labels of Vin de pays never include the word château.

Cru, a word used to classify wines can mean different things. For example, in the Médoc part of Bordeaux, this terms means the château is one of the classified growths in the regions. In Saint-Émilion, the term cru is of little importance because it bears little relation to quality. For Provence the term cru classé is included only for historical reasons. On the other hand, the use of the term cru in Switzerland has no foundation and it is included at the producer's discretion.

=== Accessibility ===
To better reach the market of blind or sight-impaired wine consumers, labels have appeared printed in Braille. Currently the only known winemaker to print all their labels in Braille is Chapoutier winery in France, who began the practice in 1996. Other wineries in a number of countries have followed Chapoutier's lead and have braille available on at least some of their bottles.

== Neck and back labels ==
Neck and/or back labels may appear on a bottle. The neck label may include the vintage date and the back label usually gives extra (and usually optional) information about the wine. Government required warnings are usually found in the back label, as well as UPCs. For example, the United States requires alcoholic beverages to include a warning regarding the consumption of alcohol during pregnancy. The label also has to mention the possibility of a reduced ability to drive while intoxicated. Wine labels in the US must also disclose that the wine contains sulfites.

== Wine laws ==
There are different reasons for wine laws. Labelling regulations can be intended to prevent wine from sounding better than it is. Also, it is illegal to say that a wine is made from one grape when it is actually from another.

The label must also include the name and address of the bottler of the wine. If the producer is not the bottler, the bottle will say that the wine was bottled by X bottler for Y producer. Table wines may carry the name of the bottler and the postal code. The label must also include the country of origin.

The size of the font is also regulated for mandatory information. Alcohol content must be included in the label, with some jurisdictions also requiring brief nutritional data, such as caloric value, carbohydrate/sugar content, etc. In Australia and the United States a wine label must also mention that it has sulfites in certain circumstances.

Regulations may permit table wines to be labelled with only the colour and flavour, and no indication of quality. The use of words such as Cuvée and grand vin in labels is controlled. As mentioned above, a vin de pays must never be from a château, but from a domaine.

=== Allergen warnings ===
New Zealand and Australian labelling regulations have required an allergen warning to appear on wine labels since 2002 due to the use of egg whites, milk, and isinglass in the fining and clarifying of the wine. The United States is considering similar requirements. Winemakers in the US have been resistant to this requirement because the decision to put a wine through a fining process normally occurs after the labels have been ordered, which could lead to allergen warnings on wines that have had no exposure to allergens. Wine labels from the member states of the European Union must also disclose after 30 June 2012 that the wine was treated with casein and ovalbumin, derived from milk and egg respectively, used as fining agents in the winemaking.

== Collecting ==
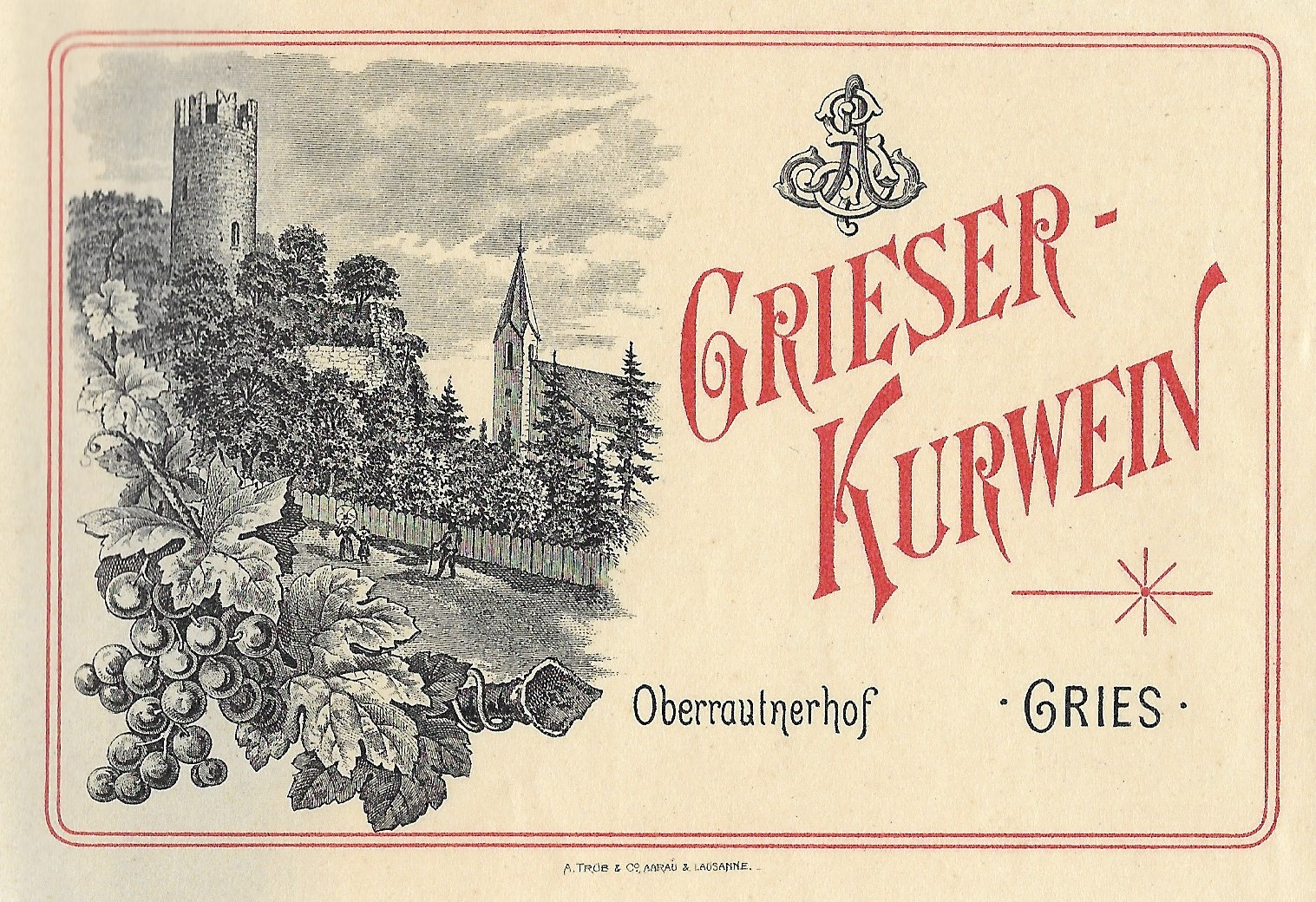
Wine label of the Grieser Kurwein, 1910 ca

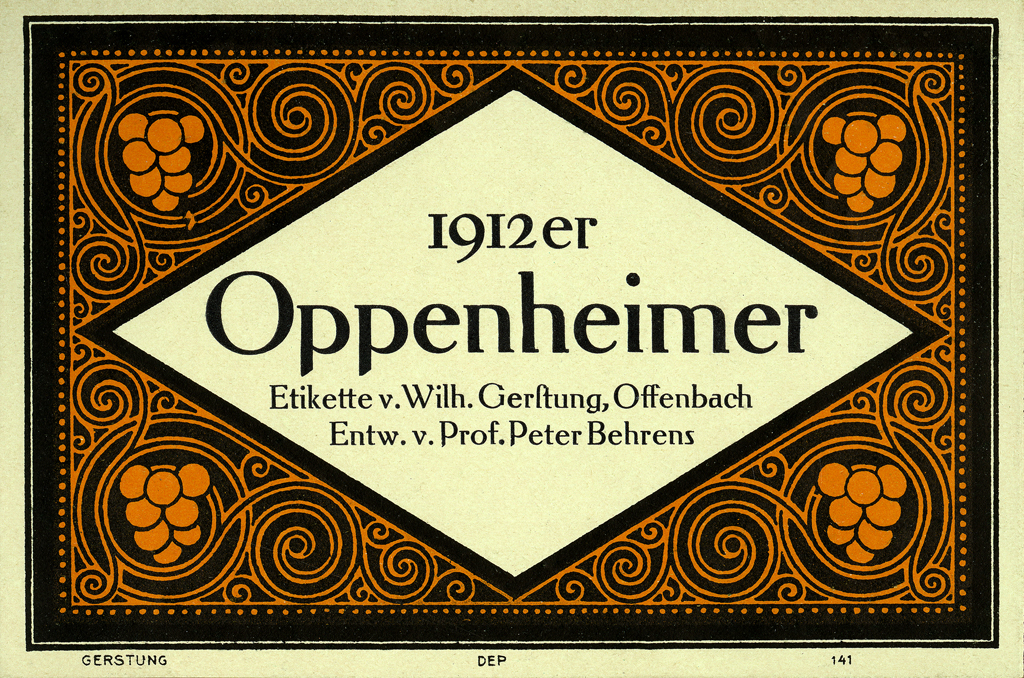
Historical wine label

=== Paper wine labels ===
Paper wine labels have long been collected. This can turn into a full-fledged hobby, with collections organized by theme, country, or region. For others, saving labels may be part of maintaining a wine tasting-notes journal, or just simply to remember a particular wine.

While labels were once easily steamed off, recent automatic bottling and labeling processes at wineries have led to the use of stronger glues. Removing these labels is often difficult and may result in considerable damage to the label. A recent, though by no means universal, innovation to bypass this problem is the use of bottles that come with the ability to tear off a small part of the label in order to remind the drinker of the name and bearing of the wine.

If full label removal is desired, a common approach involves putting hot water inside the bottle which makes the hold of the glue weaker. A knife can then be used to remove the label from one side by lifting it off with even pressure.

Commercial label removal kits apply a strong, transparent sticker over the label surface. The goal is to carefully pull off the sticker and literally tear the front design of the label away from the glued back. In practice, varying degrees of success are encountered and extensive damage to the label can occur.

=== Other forms ===
Objects also called wine labels, but known too as decanter labels or bottle tickets, are also an area of interest to collectors. The Wine Label Circle was formed in 1952 and conducts research into these objects. These objects of silver, mother-of-pearl, ivory or enamel were, in the 18th and 19th centuries, used to identify the contents of the decanter or bottle on which they were hung, the contents of which may have included in addition to wines and spirits, sauces, condiments, flavourings, perfumes, toilet waters, medicines, inks, soft drinks, preserves and cordials

== See also ==
- International variety
- Alcohol packaging warning messages
