= Taferielt =

Variety of grape

- Grape (Vitis)
- Color of berry skin: Noir
- Species: Vitis vinifera
- Also called: Akhal Meguergueb, Farana Lekhal, and other synonyms
- Origin: Morocco
- Formation of seeds: Complete
- Sex of flowers: Hermaphrodite
- VIVC number: 12196

Taferielt is an indigenous Moroccan wine, table, and raisin grape. It produces medium to very long clusters of dense, ellipsoid/obovoid, blue-black grapes. It is a parent, along with Jaén blanco, of the Moroccan variety Blanc de Rhafsaï.

It is a very old variety thought to descend from the wild vines of Morocco, showing clear differentiation from other vines of the Middle Atlas, and the Kabylie and Aurès Mountains of Algeria. It covered 80% of vineyard space in the Rif mountains in the early 1960s, and previously was found as far afield as the Balearic Islands in pre-phylloxera times, where it was known as Farrana noir. Its name, Taferielt, probably originates as a placename since it does not occur as a word in any of the Berber dialects in its traditional area of cultivation. It has good resistance to oidium and mildew.

== Synonyms ==
Akhal Meguergueb, Akhal Mguergueb, Farana Lekhal, Farana Lekheal, Farana Noir, Farana Noir De Medea, Farrana Noir, M'guargueb, Meguergueb Akhel, Tafourialt, Tafrial, Tafriolet
