= Castel Group =

French beverage company

- Industry: Wine, beer, soft drinks
- Founded: 1949
- Headquarters: Bordeaux, France
- Number of locations: multinational
- Key people: [[Pierre Castel, Alain Castel, Romy Castel,Rose Castel,))
- Number of employees: 28 000
- Website: https://www.vins-castel.wine/

Castel Group (French Groupe Castel) is a French beverage company. It was established in 1949 by Pierre Castel, who continues to run the company as a family-owned concern.

Castel is the largest French wine producer and owns the biggest French and foreign wine brands distributed in France. Castel Group is also the French leader for table wines and the number four for beers and soft drinks in Africa (after SABMiller, Heineken N.V., and Guinness), and—after Constellation Brands and Gallo—number four for wine worldwide. Castel claims to have a 25 percent share of profits from the African beer market.

== History ==
Starting with a wine merchant business in Bordeaux, the company steadily expanded in size and scope. Castel grew into other parts of the wine business, first bottling, then acquisition of viniculture lands and brands—Chateau de Goelane, a Bordeaux Superieur, was acquired in 1957—later distribution by buying the wine specialty stores of Nicolas (1998) and marketing.

In 2022, French anti-terrorism prosecutors opened an investigation into allegations of potential complicity in war crimes made against Groupe Castel in the Central African Republic (CAR), citing deals to provide armed militia UPC with cash and vehicle support in order to secure regional market position.

== Wine ==
Groupe Castel produces many table wines (vins de table). It expanded its wine offering by buying its main competitor, Société des Vins de France, from Pernod Ricard in 1992. The company has a number of well branded wines such as Baron de Lestac, Roche Mazet, Vieux Papes and La Villageoise. It also bought the Malesan and Sidi Brahim wines. In 2008 the company expanded from the south of France to the Loire valley and the Bourgogne. Higher tier wines are sold by the Chateaux and Estate section of Castel (listed below).

Since 2008 Groupe Castel has made more efforts to decrease its dependence on the French market and become more visible in English speaking countries, Eastern Europe, and the Eastern Asia, primarily China.

As of 2015, Castel owns 1,400 ha of vineyards in France and 1,600 ha in Morocco, Tunisia, and Ethiopia in Africa. It produced 640 million bottles, 59% for the French market.

=== Baron de Lestac ===
Baron de Lestac is a Bordeaux wine brand owned by Groupe Castel. Baron de Lestac is produced as a red wine (a blend of Cabernet Sauvignon and Merlot) and a white wine (a blend of Sauvignon and Sémillon), both Bordeaux AOC wines and produced with an influence of oak. The wine is sold in a variety of containers including bottles and bag-in-box.

A Haut-Médoc AOC wine is also produced, under the name Les Hauts de Lestac, and is marketed as a high-end version of Baron de Lestac.

In 2007, at 750,000 cases (9 million bottles), Baron de Lestac was the third most selling Bordeaux brand behind Mouton Cadet and Castel's Malesan, and the fastest-growing.

== Beer ==
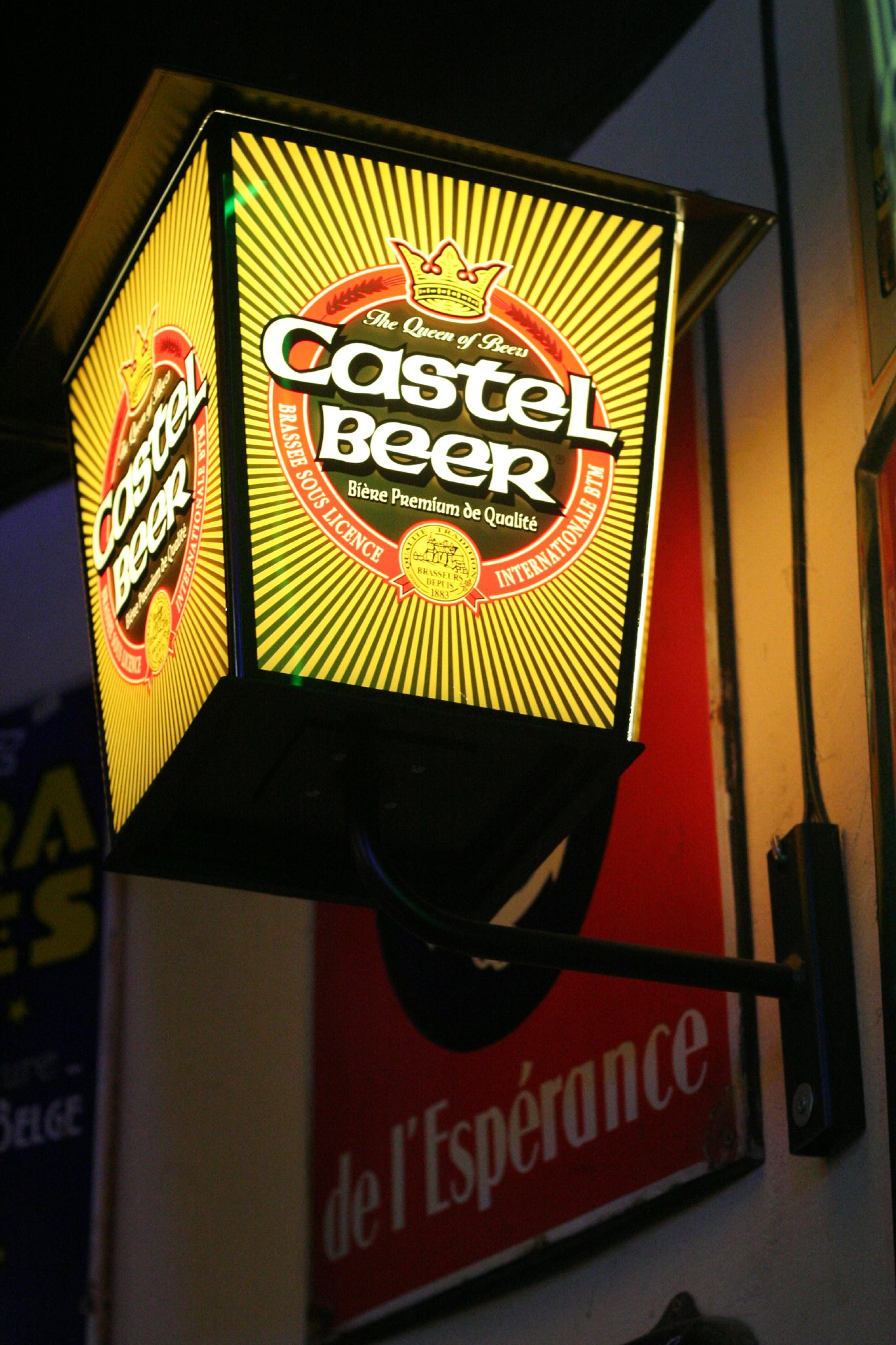
A promotional sconce for Castel Beer, the company's core beer product

In 1990, it purchased a major competitor in African beer, Brasseries et Glacières Internationales (BGI). In 1994 Castel added La Société de Limonaderies et Brasseries d'Afrique (SOLIBRA) that is focused on soft drinks. In 2003 the company bought Brasseries du Maroc, 2011 Brasseries Star Madagascar, and 2014 Nouvelle Brasserie de Madagascar.

Major beer brands are Flag and Castel. The company produces 28 million hectolitres of beer and soft drinks in Africa each year.

In 2001, SABMiller acquired 20 percent of Castel's African Beverages operations and Castel acquired 38 percent of SABMiller Africa and SABMiller Botswana. An update of the partnership in 2012 saw the two combine their Nigerian businesses under SABMiller's control with their Angolan businesses set to be handled by Castel.

== Other ==
Castel produces olive oil from Morocco and maintains sugar plantations in Africa.

== African operations ==
Castel's African operations include beer, soft drinks, bottled water, sugar and other agricultural products. Its beer portfolio includes Castel Beer and 33 Export, as well as local brands produced by its subsidiaries. In 2023, Le Monde reported that the African business claimed approximately €5 billion in annual revenue and 40,000 employees in about twenty countries. By comparison, the group's wine activities generated approximately €1 billion in revenue.

== List of Castel Chateaux and Estates ==
- Château d'Arcins
- Château Barreyres
- Château Beychevelle (GCC)
- Château de La Botinière
- Château du Bousquet
- Château Campet
- Château Cavalier
- Domaine de la Clapière
- Château Ferrande
- Château de Goëlane
- Château de Haut Coulon
- Château Hourtou
- Château de l'Hyvernière
- Château Latour Camblanes
- Château du Lort
- Château Malbec
- Château Mirefleurs
- Château Montlabert
- Château Tour Prignac

== Corporate governance ==
Castel is not publicly traded, and its ownership is divided among members of the Castel family through a network of holding companies and trusts. Pierre Castel stepped back from day-to-day management during the early 2020s. Gregory Clerc, who had previously worked as a tax lawyer for the group, was appointed chief executive in 2023.

A dispute over the group's management became public in late 2025. In February 2026, family members led by Pierre Castel's daughter Romy said that shareholders had removed Clerc and chairman Pierre Baer from the board of the Singapore-based holding company IBBM. IBBM disputed the validity of the resolutions. The family subsequently obtained a temporary order from the Singapore High Court preventing Clerc and Baer from acting as IBBM directors while the proceedings were unresolved. Reporting in July 2026 continued to identify Clerc as the group's chief executive while describing the succession dispute as ongoing.
