= Beer in Morocco =

Beer in Morocco was introduced by the French in the 20th century. Société des Brasseries du Maroc is part of the Castel Group and oversees the production and distribution of beer in the country, mostly to tourists in hotels and bars. Popular beers include Spéciale Flag (pilsner) and Stork (light lager). The Moroccan premium beer is Casablanca (also a lager), which costs more than the other two. Casablanca is also exported and, for instance, served in the Morocco pavilion at Epcot in Walt Disney World, Orlando, Florida.

The breweries of Brasseries du Maroc are located in Fes, Tangier, and Casablanca, and a bottling unit exists in Marrakesh. The best-selling international beer in Morocco is Heineken, which was locally brewed by Brasseries du Maroc under the supervision of Heineken International but is now imported.

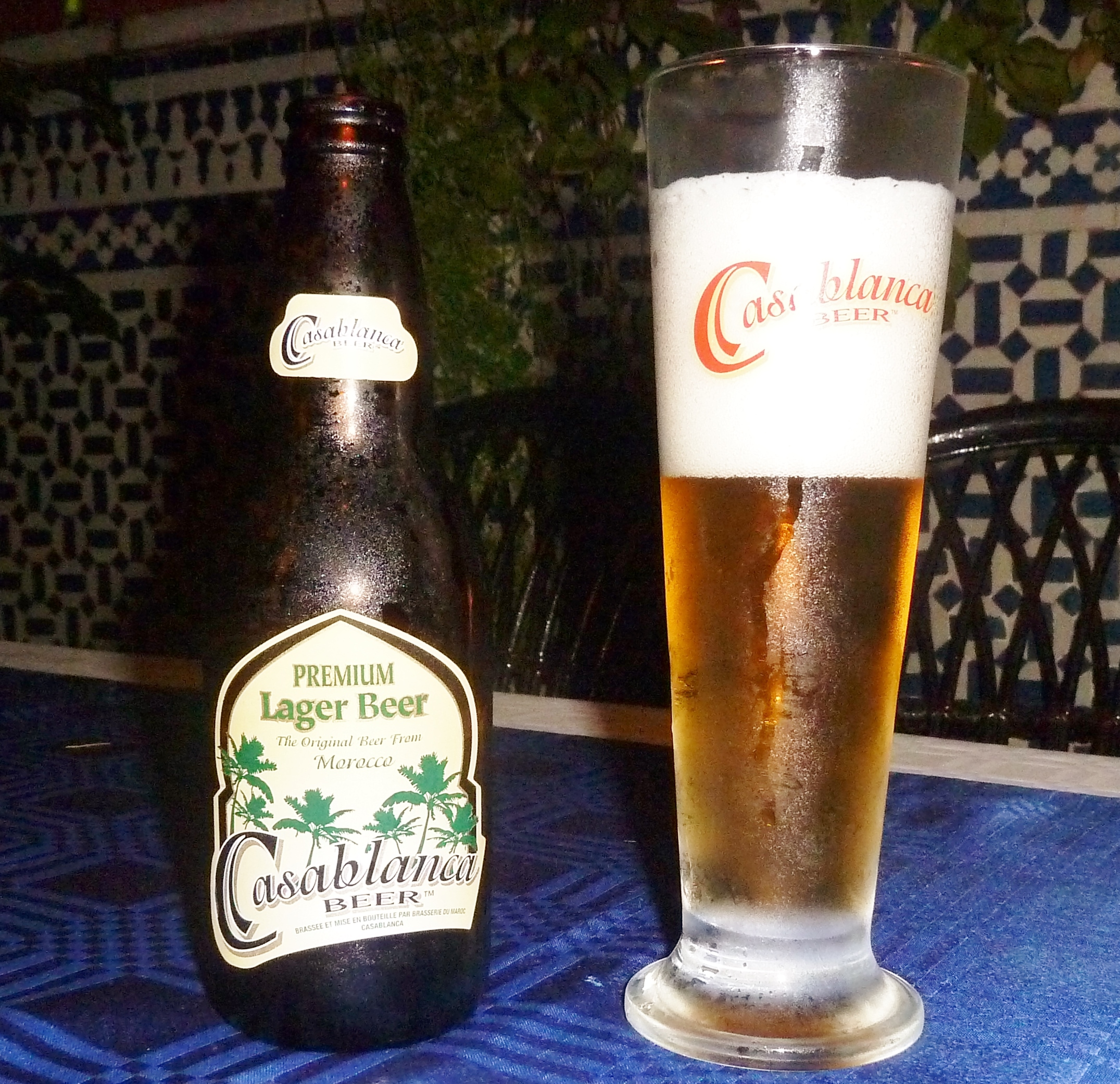
Casablanca

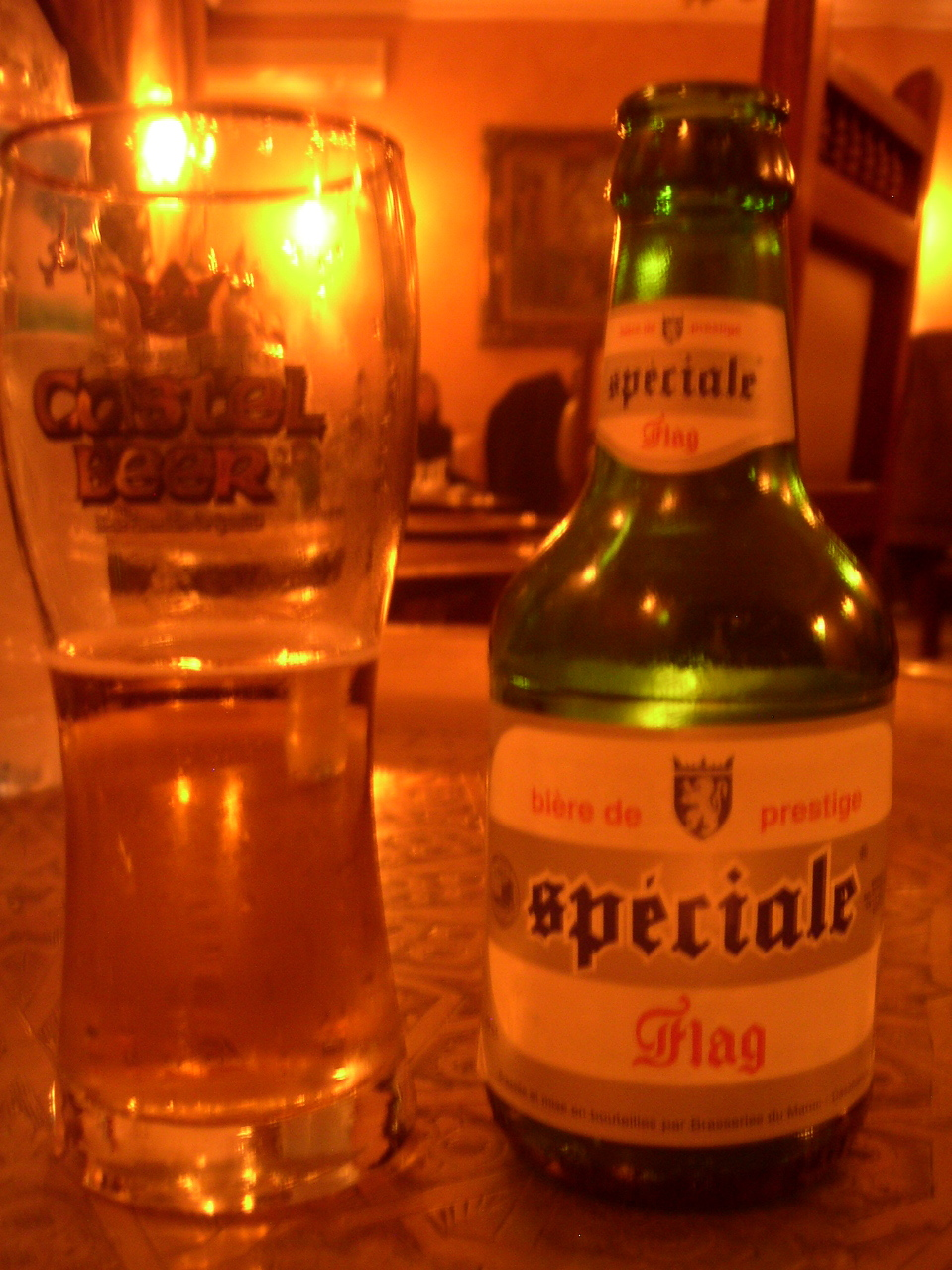
Spéciale Flag

== See also ==
- Beer and breweries by region
