= Agriculture in Algeria =

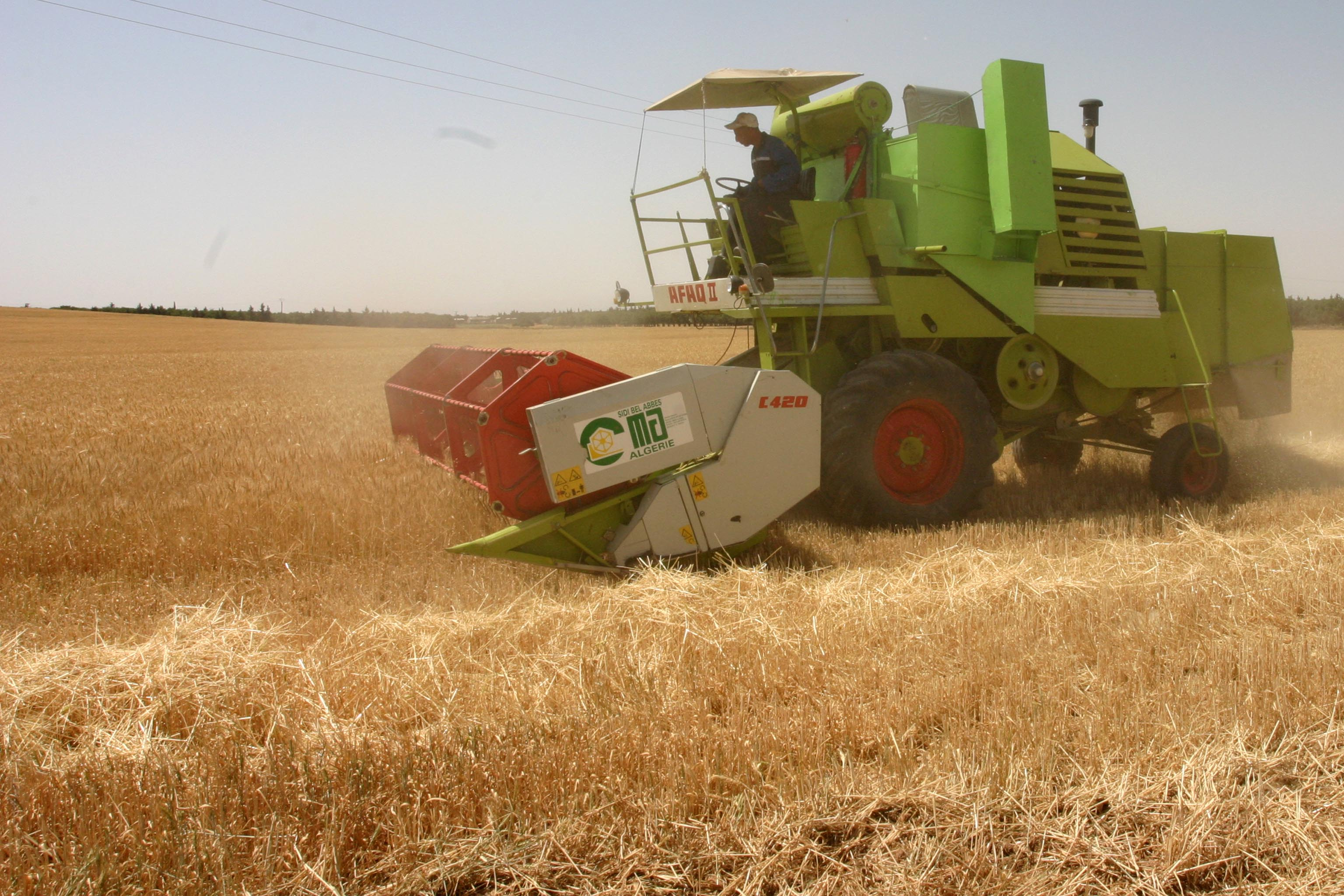
Cereal harvest in 2011, Algeria

Agriculture in Algeria composes 25% of Algeria's economy and 12% of its GDP in 2010. Prior to Algeria's colonization in 1830, nonindustrial agriculture provided sustenance for its population of approximately 2-3 million. Domestic agriculture production included wheat, barley, citrus fruits, dates, nuts, and olives. After 1830, colonizers introduced 2200 individual farms operated by private sectors. Colonial farmers continued to produce a variety of fruits, nuts, wheat, vegetables. Algeria became a large producer of wine during the late 19th century due to a crop epidemic that spread across France. Algeria's agriculture evolved after independence was achieved in 1962. The industry experienced multiple policy changes modernize and decry on food imports. Today, Algeria's agriculture industry continues to expand modern irrigation and size of cultivable land.

Despite Algeria's geographical size, less than 4% of its total land area is cultivable. Prior to 1987, all cultivable land was possessed by the state. The state divided this land into sections recognized as the domain's agricoles socialistes. These farms were abolished after 1987 and the state sold the cultivable land to individuals. However, the government of Algeria retains control over one third of all cultivable land.

== Production ==
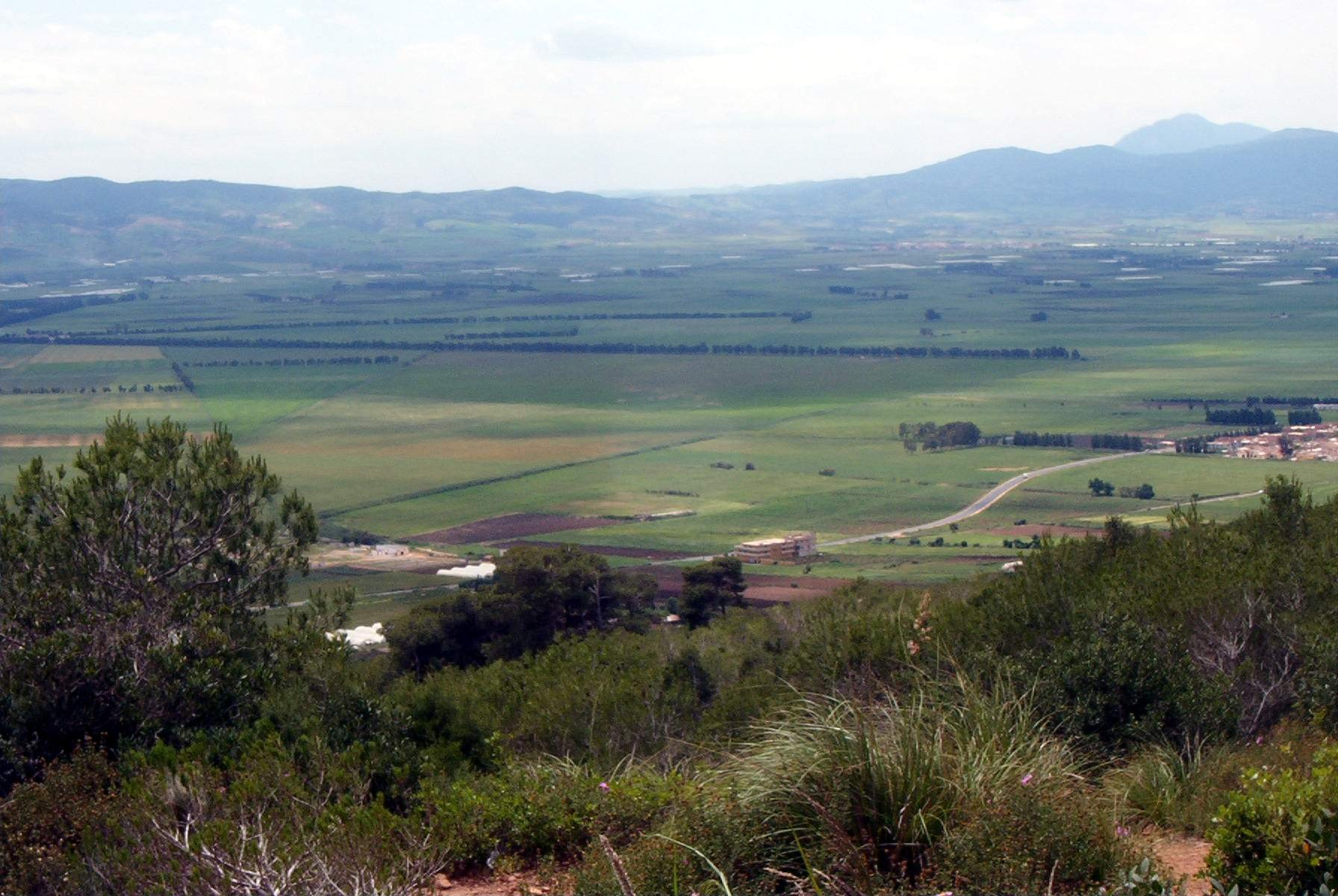
The Mitidja plain in northern Algeria

Algeria produced, in 2018:

- 4.6 million tonnes of potato (17th largest producer in the world);
- 3.9 million tonnes of wheat;
- 2 million tons of watermelon (6th largest producer in the world);
- 1.9 million tons of barley (18th largest producer in the world);
- 1.4 million tons of onion (16th largest producer in the world);
- 1.3 million tons of tomato (18th largest producer in the world);
- 1.1 million tons of orange (14th largest producer in the world);
- 1 million tons of date (4th largest producer in the world, second only to Egypt, Saudi Arabia and Iran);
- 860 thousand tons of olives (6th largest producer in the world);
- 651 thousand tons of pepper;
- 502 thousand tons of grape;
- 431 thousand tons of carrot;
- 388 thousand tons of pumpkin;
- 262 thousand tons of tangerine;
- 242 thousand tons of apricot (4th largest producer in the world, second only to Turkey, Iran and Uzbekistan);
- 207 thousand tons of cauliflower and broccoli;
- 202 thousand tons of garlic;
- 200 thousand tons of pear;
- 193 thousand tons of cucumber;
- 190 thousand tons of peach;
- 186 thousand tons of pea;
- 181 thousand tons of aubergine;
- 124 thousand tons of artichoke (5th largest producer in the world, losing only to Italy, Egypt, Spain and Peru);
- 118 thousand tons of oats;
- 111 thousand tons of plum (20th largest producer in the world);
- 109 thousand tons of fig (4th largest producer in the world, second only to Turkey, Egypt and Morocco);

In addition to smaller productions of other agricultural products.

== Agriculture prior to colonialism ==
Prior to the colonial period, Algerian agriculture produced fruits, nuts, and vegetables using nonindustrial methods. Most of Algeria's agriculture is produced in the east on the plains around Bejaia and Annaba. Agriculture workers sustained Algeria's population of two to three million people without importing high quantities of food. However, following Algeria's population surge during and after the colonial period, Algeria imported high quantities of wheat, dairy, and meat.

== Agriculture during colonialism ==
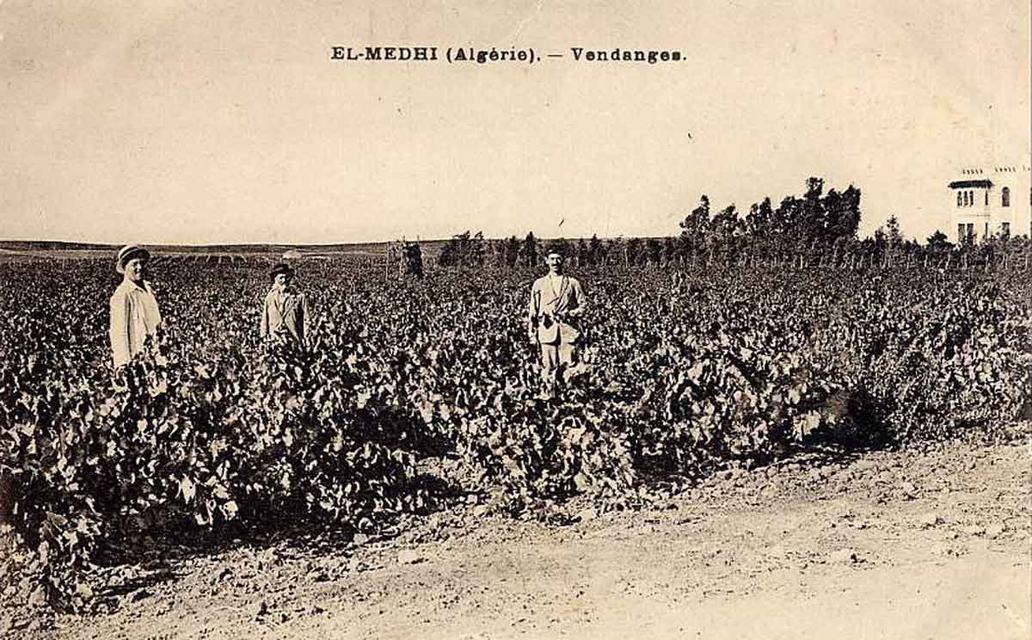
Harvest in 20th century Algeria.

Algeria's agriculture system was not profitable for France during the colonial period, except during the vineyard epidemic of the 1880s. This lack of profit is marked by the Bank of Algeria's refusal to offer credit to industrial farms in Algeria. During this period, however, Algeria continued to produce fruits, vegetables, wine, and animals to sustain its population. However, during the epidemic, Algeria became a major producer of wine.

During the colonial period, Algeria was transformed into "an enormous vineyard". Vineyards were limited during the early stages of colonialism. Farmers often only grew vineyards for personal and social consumption near their other crops. France's prolific metropolitan gardens did not necessitate wine imports from its North African colonies. However, Algeria's role in wine production transformed during the late nineteenth century. Phylloxera gripped vineyards across France and sparked an agricultural epidemic. This epidemic struck France at an inopportune time as it was evolving into a world leader for wine exports. France's economy plummeted and the agricultural sector began searching for opportunities.

The French government gave farmers in Algeria incentive to produce wine during the epidemic spreading through French vineyards. Vineyards began expanding across the country. Large quantities of wine flowed from Algeria to France and to other countries across the world. Algeria developed a reputation for growing many high quality wines. However, Algeria's role as a leader in wine production was short lived. France's vineyards recovered in the following decades and it lessened its reliance on Algerian wine.

== Agriculture post colonialism ==
After independence in 1962 colonial farms were replaced by laborers. 2200 farms operated by colonizers were now operated laborers who had previously worked on the farms. The term autogestion (self-management)emerged to describe these farms. Wage laborers continued to follow the farming practices of the French, including farm machines and chemical enhancers. This allowed Algerian farmers to export their products to international markets. However, these private farms yielded only small quantities of produce due to the unstable government and lack of workers.

After independence, the French government assured Algerian farmers that it would purchase reserves of its wine and other produce. However, France's agriculture sector pressured the government to source wine internally and rescind contracts with Algeria. Cancelled contracts created an oversupply of wine in Algeria. The Soviet Union purchased high quantities of wine from Algeria in the 1970s, but not enough to alleviate Algeria's oversupply.

In this period private corporations and individuals owned and operated farms in Algeria. Algeria's model extended the previous French model, with French farmers replaced by Algerians, sometimes including the peasants who had tilled the land during the colonial regime. Although individuals could buy and operate farms, private companies owned most the farms. Inequitable distribution of farms in Algeria inspired an agricultural revolution.

== Post agrarian revolution and contemporary efforts ==
Disenchanted with Algeria's low production yield and large dependency on imports for food, the government launched an agriculture revitalization program at the beginning of the 1980s, recognizing that the model of the agrarian revolution had been unsuccessful and harmful to agriculture. Algeria's Ministry of Agriculture withdrew socialist control of agriculture and reintroduced the private sector to the agricultural industry. New policies allowed private corporations to purchase fertile land and introduce independent techniques in a shift from socialist administration to a market economy.

From 1987 to 1999, the ministry of agriculture continued to lessen state control of agriculture. The state retained control of approximately one-third of cultivable land in Algeria, but continued to allow the private sector to invest and take over the industry. The private sector purchased farm resources independently and hired workers of their own choosing. In addition the government allowed private companies to contract with farming networks, resulting in an expansion of the industry and increased quality production.

Further steps to develop the agriculture sector include public sector investments increasing from 10% to 15%. The government also pledged in the 1990s to expand modern irrigation to 20 000 hectares of land. Reliance on rainwater was detrimental to the industry's success; Algeria's inconsistent yields and quality dissuaded countries from signing contracts with Algerian farmers. acted on its need to modernize its agriculture industry to compete with other countries. Modern irrigation systems allow the agriculture industry to develop stable relationships with foreign trade networks. But a change was occurring, and Algeria showed the agriculture industry that it was just as deserving of contracts as other countries.

These changes improved both Algeria's economy and its ability to provide food for its population, which, prior to agricultural reform, Algeria's ministry of agriculture had been unable to do. Algeria imported 85% of its food from other countries, making it as one of the largest food importers in the world. However, following the government's investment in agriculture, Algeria has substantially decreased its reliance on imported food. Algeria produces 100% of its domestic consumption of potatoes, tomatoes, and meat. Employment numbers in the agriculture sector have increased by 120% from 2000 to 2004.

Employment in agriculture in comparison with Algeria's total labor force steadily declined after independence was achieved. In the 1970s, 64% of the total labor force worked in agriculture. As of 2000, this number has declined to 24%.

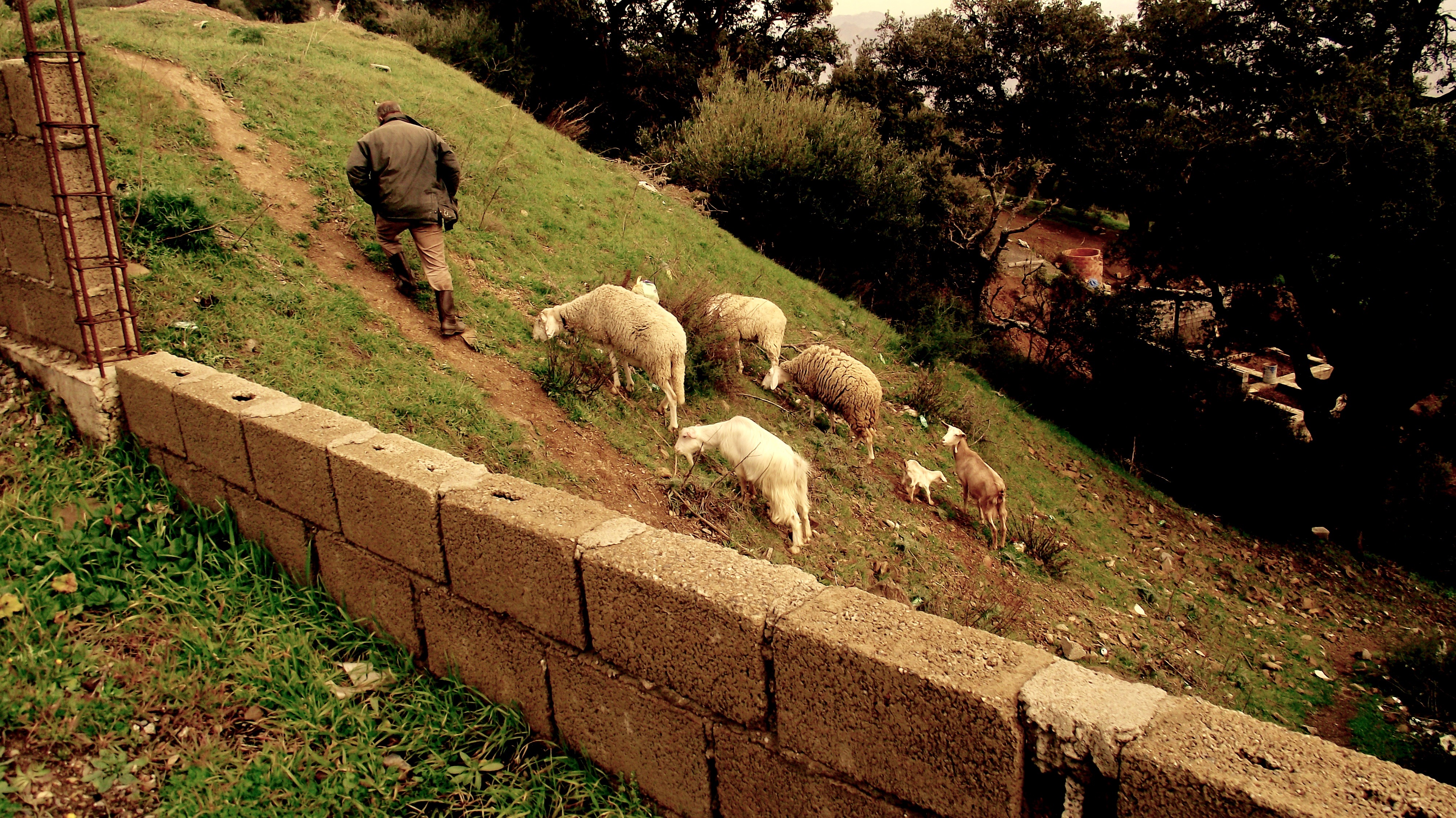
A Berber shepherd in Kabylia.

Large quantities of crin vegetal (vegetable horse-hair), an excellent fibre, are made from the leaves of the dwarf palm. The olive, both for its fruit and oil, and tobacco are cultivated with great success.

Algeria also exports figs, dates, esparto grass and cork. It is the largest oat market in Africa.

== Wine production ==
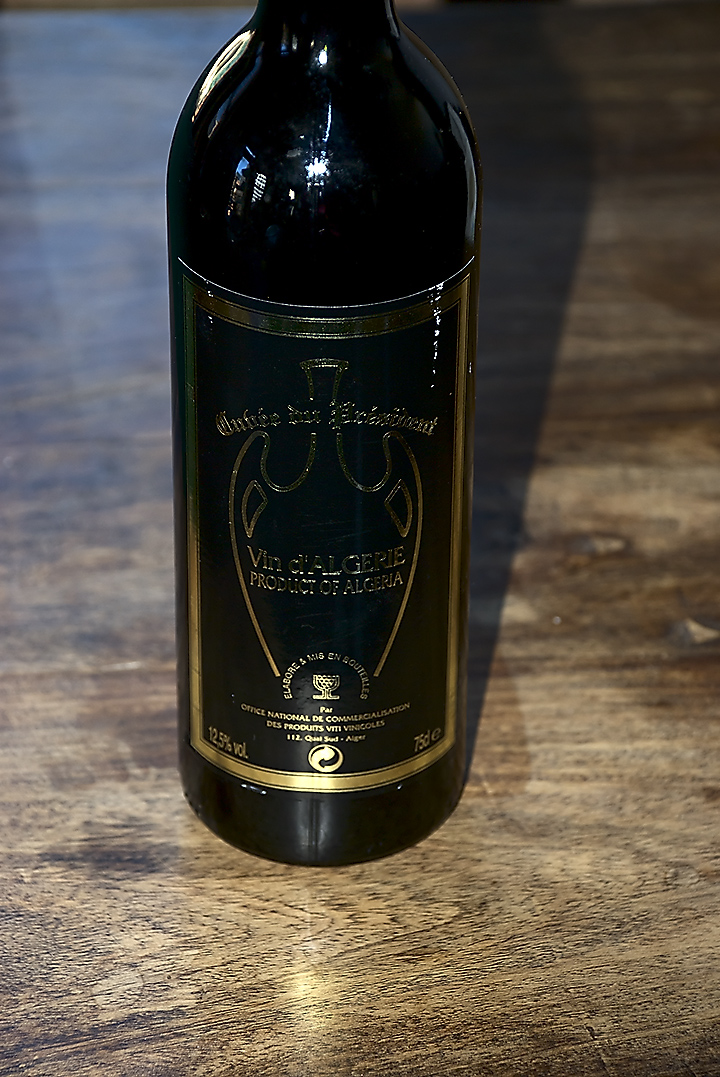
A bottle of Algerian wine.

Throughout arable lands in Algeria the soil favours the growth of vines. The country, in the words of an expert sent to report on the subject by the French government, "can produce an infinite variety of wines suitable to every constitution and to every caprice of taste".

The growing of vines was undertaken early by the colonists, but it was not until vineyards in France were attacked by phylloxera that the export of wine from Algeria became significant. In 1883, despite precautionary measures, Algerian vineyards were also attacked but in the meantime the quality of their wines had been proved. In 1850, less than 2,000 acres (8 km^{2}) were devoted to the grape, but in 1878, this had increased to over 42,000 acres (170 km^{2}), which yielded 7,436,000 gallons (28,000 m^{3}) of wine. Despite bad seasons and ravages of insects, cultivation extended, and in 1895, the vineyards covered 300,000 acres (1,200 km^{2}), the produce being 88,000,000 gallons (333,000 m^{3}). The area of cultivation in 1905 exceeded 400,000 acres (1,600 km^{2}), and in that year the amount of wine produced was 157,000,000 gallons (594,000 m^{3}). By that time the limits of profitable production had been reached in many parts of the country. Practically the only foreign market for Algerian wine is France, which in 1905 imported about 110,000,000 gallons (416,000 m^{3}).

The Algerian body responsible for wine cultivation is called the National Office of Marketing of Wine Products (ONCV).
