= Cleanskin (wine) =

Term for generic label wine

In Australia and New Zealand, cleanskin wine is a term for wine whose label does not indicate the winery or the winemaker's name. It is typically sold at a low price.

The key to the viability of the whole cleanskin system is that in Australia the taxes on wine are based on the wholesale price, not on the alcohol content.

Cleanskin labels usually only show the grape variety and the year of bottling, as well as other information required by Australian law – alcohol content, volume, additives and standard drink information.

Cleanskin wines are typically sold cheaply in dozen lots for home consumption. They may be branded wines that were originally sold at a higher price and re-labelled as cleanskins, or they may be wines produced for the purpose of being sold as cleanskins. Consequently, the quality of various batches of cleanskin wine can vary significantly.

Cleanskin wine was introduced to Australia in the early 2000s as a way for the wine industry to cope with a massive oversupply of wine, and a resulting drop in prices. As a result, wine consumption in Australia has greatly increased as of 2006. Also, the price of cleanskin wine has dropped to around or below the price of beer or even bottled water.

The word "cleanskin" comes from the Australian term for unbranded cattle, and is also used to refer to undercover law enforcement agents.

== See also ==
- Australian wine
