= Berson, Gironde =

Berson
- Commune
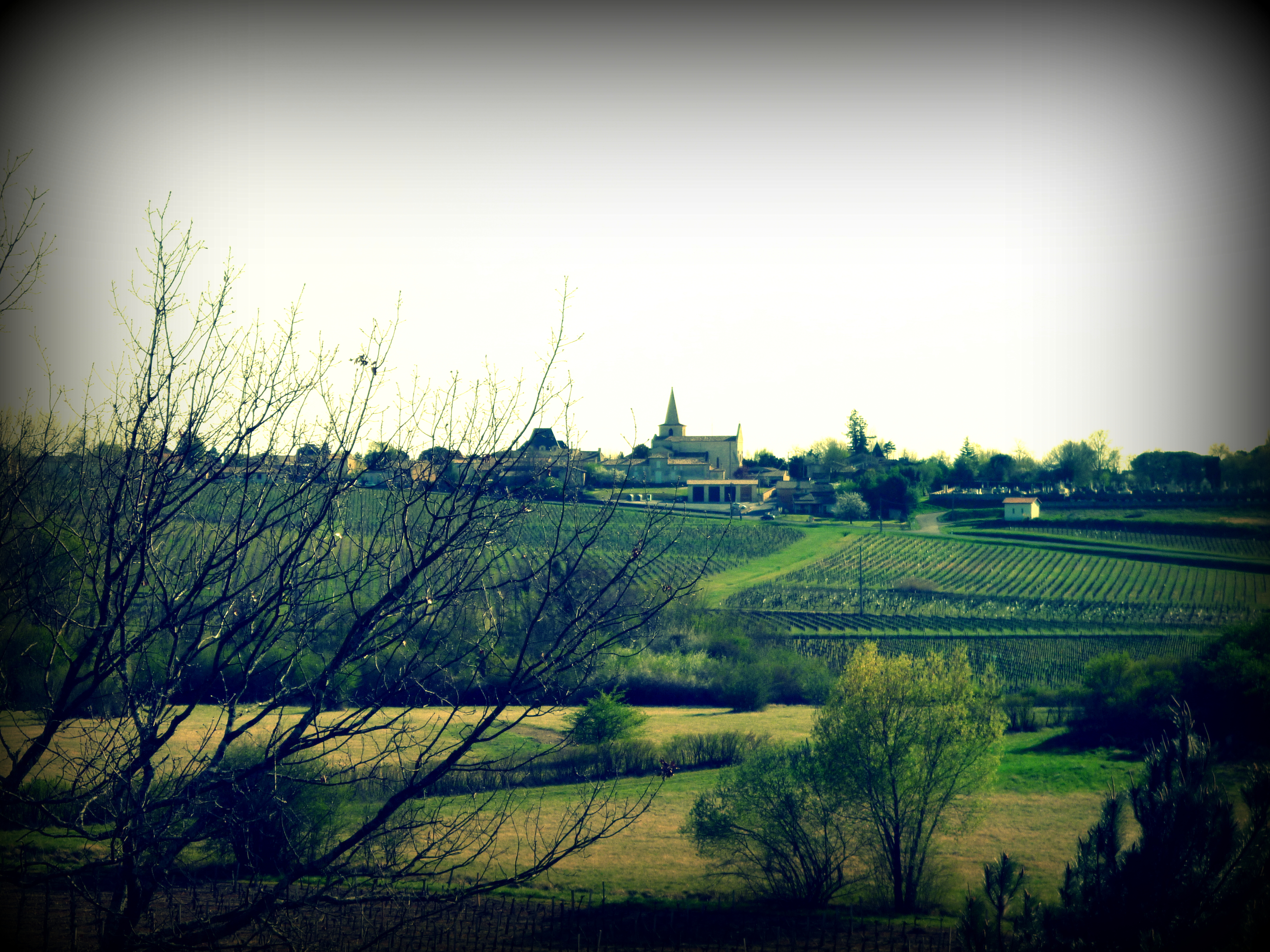
- A general view of Berson

- Coat of arms
- Location of Berson
- Location within France Location within Nouvelle-Aquitaine
- Coordinates: 45°06′32″N 0°35′08″W
- Country: France
- Region: Nouvelle-Aquitaine
- Department: Gironde
- Arrondissement: Blaye
- Canton: L'Estuaire

Government
  - Mayor (2024–2026): Jacques Davoust
- Area^{1}: 17.98 km^{2} (6.94 sq mi)
- Elevation: 86 m (282 ft)
- Highest elevation: 91 m (299 ft)
- Lowest elevation: 12 m (39 ft)
- Population (2023): 1,846
  - Density: 102.7/km^{2} (265.9/sq mi)
- Time zone: UTC+01:00 (CET)
  - Summer (DST): UTC+02:00 (CEST)
- INSEE/Postal code: 33047 /33390
- ^{1} French Land Register data, which excludes lakes, ponds, glaciers > 1 km^{2} (0.386 sq mi or 247 acres) and river estuaries.

Berson (French pronunciation: [bɛʁsɔ̃]) is a commune in the Gironde department in Nouvelle-Aquitaine in southwestern France.

== Population ==
Historical population
Year	Pop.	±% p.a.
1968	1,449	—
1975	1,467	+0.18%
1982	1,531	+0.61%
1990	1,490	−0.34%
1999	1,518	+0.21%
2007	1,697	+1.40%
2012	1,774	+0.89%
2017	1,795	+0.24%
2023	1,846	+0.47%
Source: INSEE

== See also ==
- Communes of the Gironde department
