= Nicolas (wine retailer) =

French wine retailer

Maison Nicolas
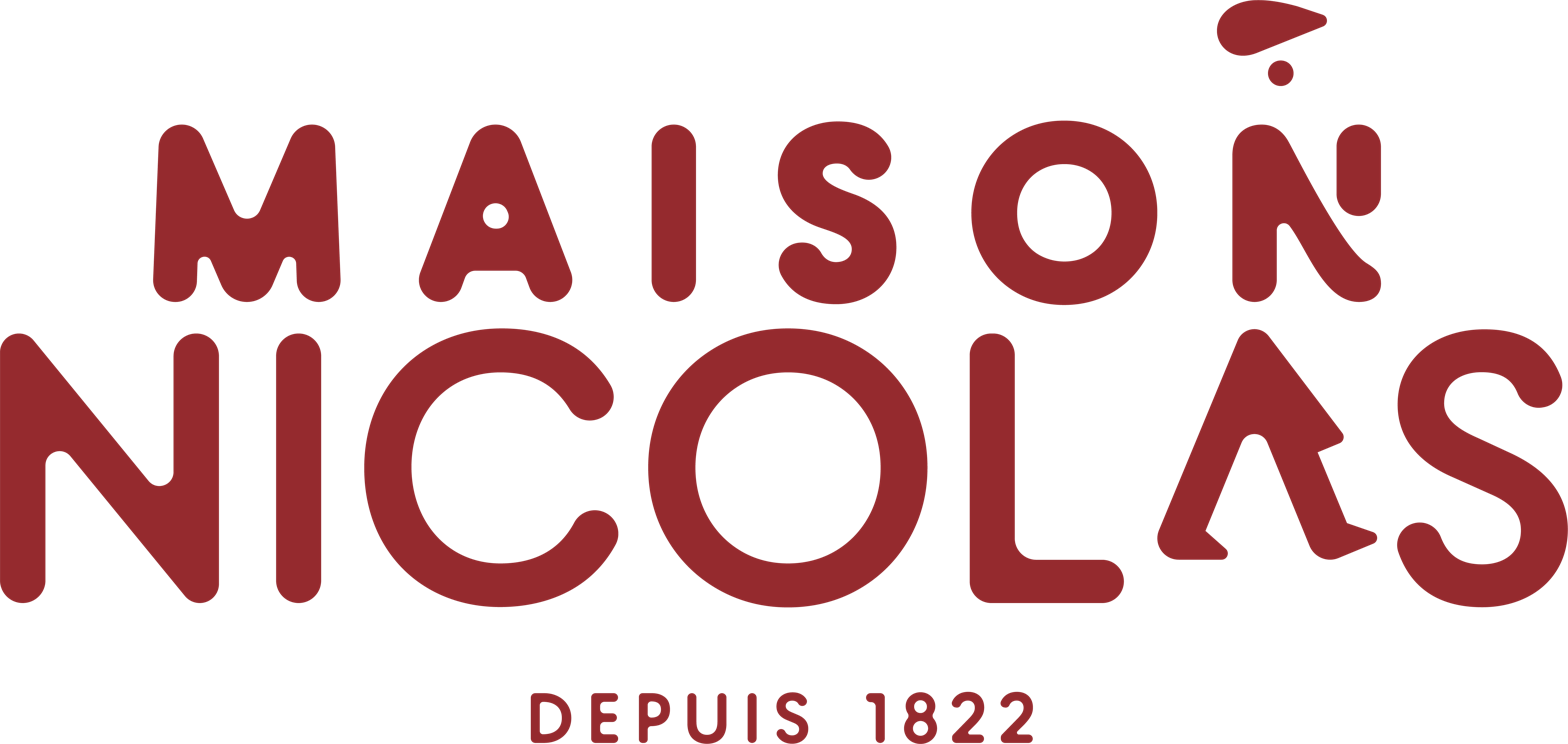
- Industry: Wine retailing
- Founded: 1822; 204 years ago
- Headquarters: Thiais, France
- Number of locations: 530
- Key people: Castel Alain, Geiger Cathy
- Number of employees: 905
- Parent: Groupe Castel
- Website: www.nicolas.com

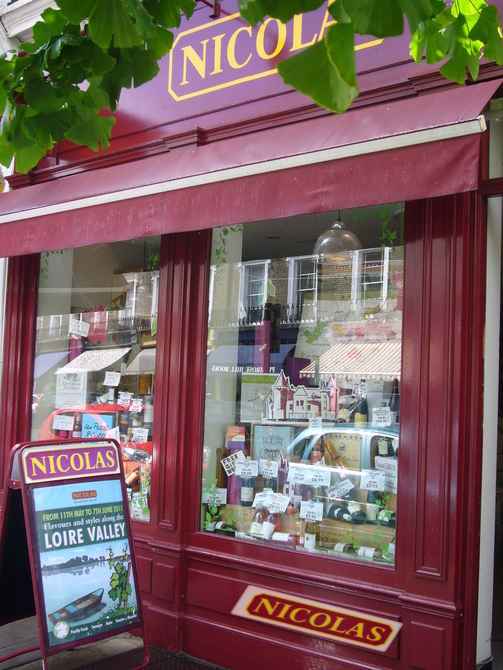
Nicolas store - Primrose Hill

Nicolas is a French wine retailer, which also has stores in other countries.

Maison Nicolas is a French wine specialist established in Paris in 1822 and operating in London since 1989. The first Maison Nicolas stores were opened in Paris in 1822, and the chain has since grown to include over 400 branches throughout France, with a number of branches in the UK, Belgium, Germany and Poland. In 1988, Maison Nicolas was bought by Groupe Castel.

Maison Nicolas has 530 stores in total, located in major towns and cities throughout France and abroad, including Great Britain where there are 7 branches in London. Nicolas stocks more than 1,200 wines, champagnes and other alcoholic beverages.
