= Henri Focillon =

French art historian

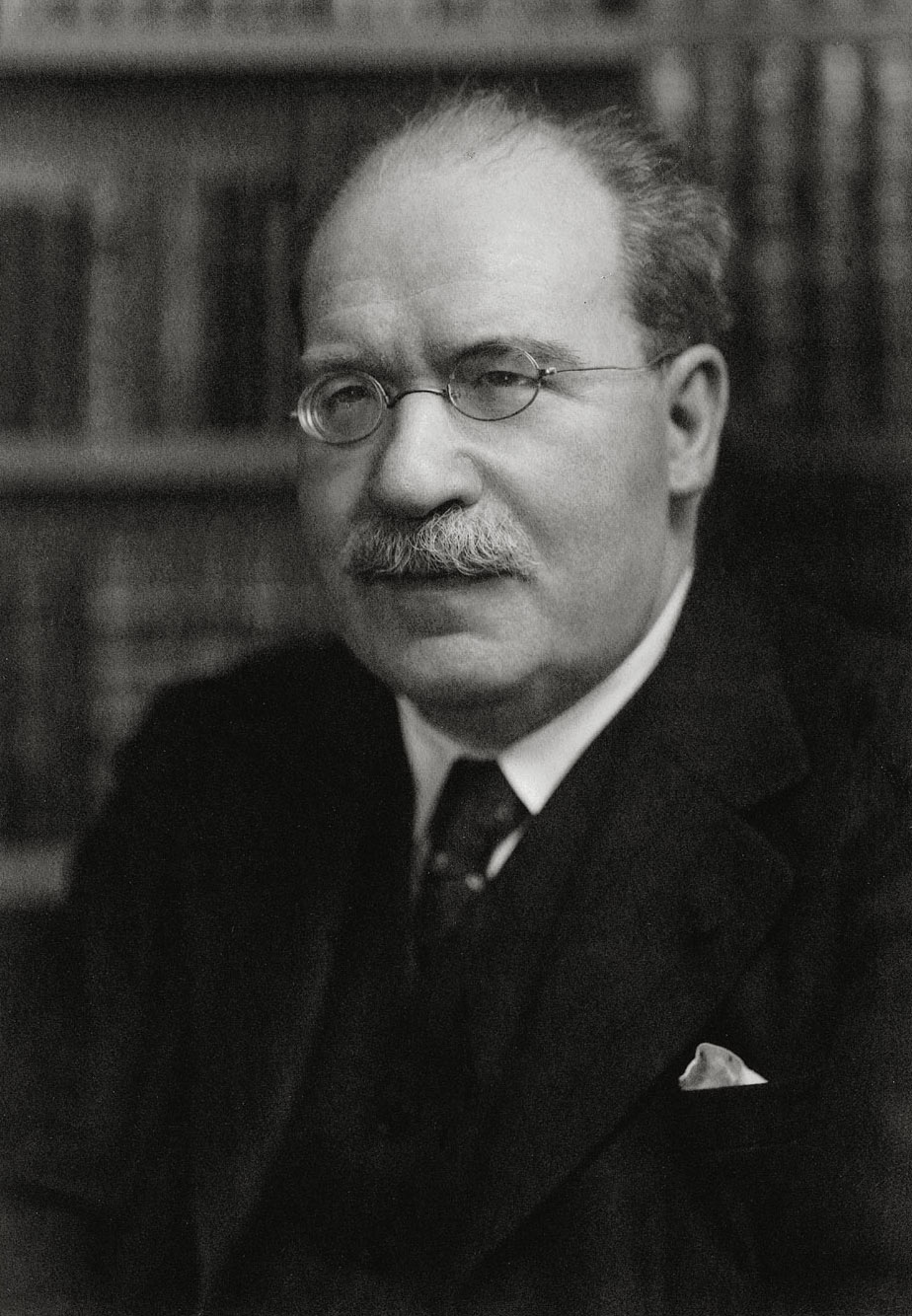
Henri Focillon

Henri Focillon (7 September 1881 – 3 March 1943) was a French art historian. He was the son of the printmaker Victor-Louis Focillon. He was Director of the Musée des Beaux-Arts in Lyon. Professor of Art History at the University of Lyon, at the Ecole des Beaux-Arts in Lyon, at the Sorbonne, at the Collège de France and then in the United States, where he went into exile and taught at Yale University. A poet, printmaker, and teacher, Focillon trained generations of art historians, including George Kubler. He remains best known for his works on medieval art, most of which were translated into English.

== Partial bibliography ==
- Vie des formes (1934, "The Life of Forms")
- Éloge de la main
- Benvenuto Cellini

Medieval Art

- Art des sculpteurs romans (1932)
- Art d'occident 1 : Moyen Âge roman et gothique
- Art d'occident 2 : Moyen Âge gothique (1938)
- Moyen Age. Survivances et réveils (1943)
- Piero della Francesca (1951)
- L'An mil (1952)

Painting

- La peinture au XIXe et XXe siècles (1927-1928, "Painting in the 19th and 20th Centuries")
- De Callot à Lautrec: Perspectives de l’art français ("From Callot to Lautrec: Perspectives on French Art")

Prints

- Giovanni-Battista Piranesi (1918)

East Asia

- L'art bouddhique (1921, "Buddhist Art")
- Hokusai (1914)
