= Mouton Cadet =

French wine brand

Mouton Cadet is the brand name of a popular range of modestly priced, generic Bordeaux wines, considered Bordeaux's most successful brand. Created by Baron Philippe de Rothschild, Mouton Cadet wine is produced through the assembly of a variety of grapes, from several Bordeaux region appellations.

== History ==
After the acclaimed vintages of 1928 and 1929, the vintage of 1930 and the following two harvests were dire, and the wine that Baron Philippe de Rothschild felt was not worthy of the Chateau Mouton-Rothschild name was this time named Mouton Cadet. "Cadet" refers to Philippe de Rothschild place as cadet, the youngest son of the family.

Initially labeled with the appellation of Pauillac, the increasing demand caused the sourcing of grapes to expand to nearby appellations Saint-Estèphe and Haut-Médoc. Over the following years, the wine came to include grapes from an even greater area, until production stopped with World War II. The wine was reborn after the war, and gained a Bordeaux AOC classification in 1947, steadily increasing in popularity due to a reputation of consistent quality. In later years the wine relies heavily on grapes sourced from the Entre-Deux-Mers district.

Mouton Cadet was marketed significantly throughout the 1950s and 1960s, placing the brand in the United Kingdom and United States. In the 1970s, a white wine was added to the label, expanding the brand's concept, which resulted in 1975 sales of more than 3 million bottles worldwide.

Philippe de Rothschild died in 1988 and control of the business passed on to his daughter Philippine de Rothschild.

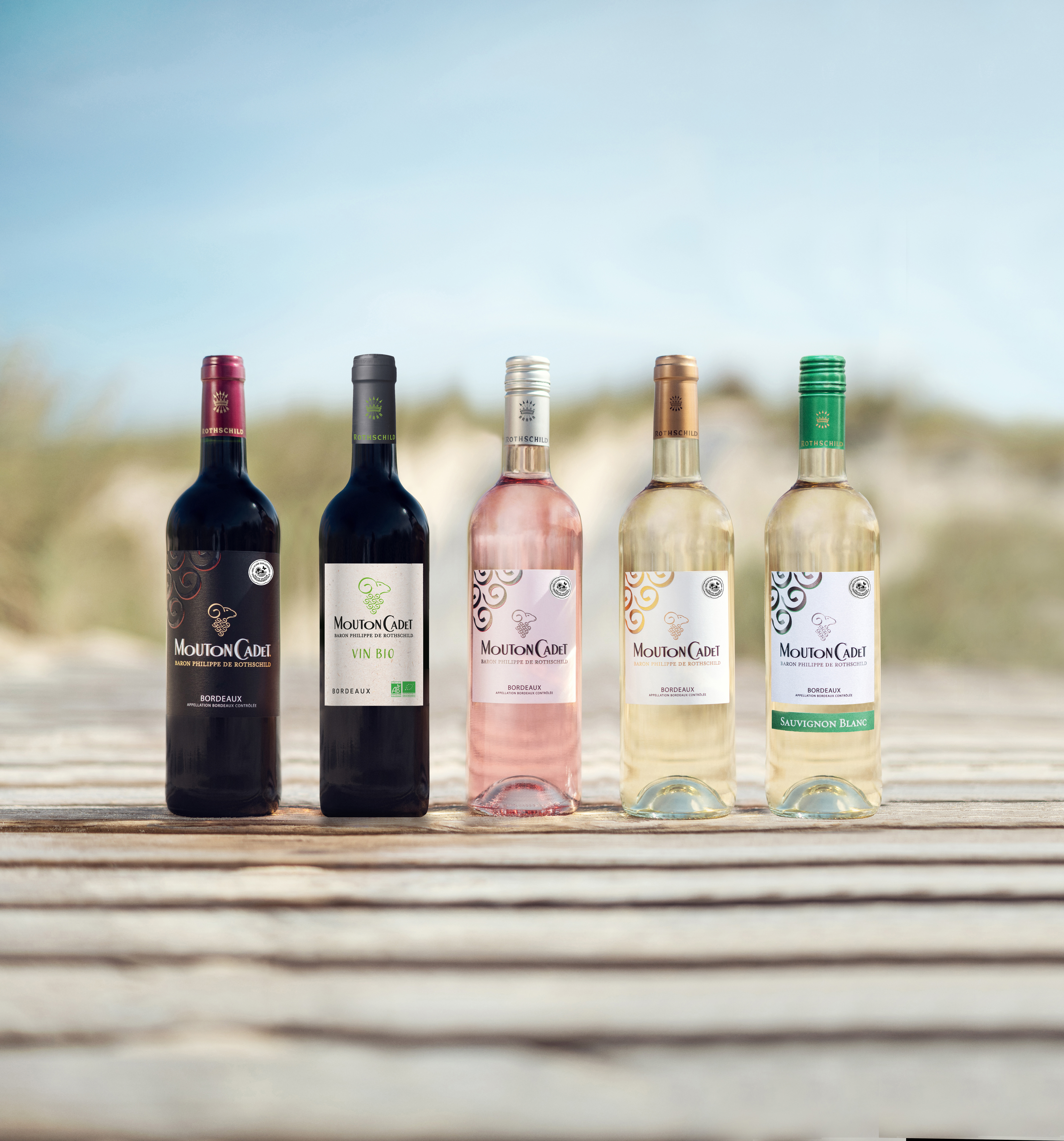
