= European Union wine regulations =

European Union wine regulations are common legislation related to wine existing within the European Union (EU), the member states of which account for almost two-thirds of the world's wine production. These regulations form a part of the Common Agricultural Policy (CAP) of EU, and regulate such things as the maximum vineyard surface allowed to individual EU member states, allowed winemaking practices and principles for wine classification and labelling. The wine regulations exist to regulate total production in order to combat overproduction of wine and to provide an underpinning to Protected designations of origin (PDOs), among other things. In a sense, the wine regulations therefore try to protect both the producer and the consumer.

The EU wine regulations, as a part of CAP, do not include regulations on age limits for buying or drinking alcohol, regulations on wine advertising or retailing and other aspects of national social or public health policies of the individual EU member states.

== History ==
While a large bulk of the text of the regulations is concerned with winemaking practices and the like, much of the history of the EU wine regulations has been linked to the issue of market imbalances and overproduction of wine.

In the early days of the CAP, the wine sector of the then-European Economic Community (EEC) was in reasonable equilibrium for a rather short period of time. During this time, there were no regulations as to plantations and few interventions into the market, as this was not needed. However, the early post-World War II saw the introduction of many technological innovations within viticulture, which soon led to increased production, while the demand stayed constant. This resulted in a surplus of wine. The answer from EEC was to intervene in the market to make some guarantee as to sales, while still keeping the freedom to plant new vineyards, which aggravated rather than solved the problem of overproduction. While looking like a very illogical policy in hindsight, this was in keeping with the view that what the EEC was aiming to do was to balance variations in production from year to year.

After the realisation that the surplus was a structural one rather than a temporary variation, the wine regulations were changed to be more interventionist in 1978, with a ban on additional vineyard plantations, which means that a system of planting rights was introduced to regulate replantations. Also, requirements to distill the surplus wine into industrial alcohol were introduced, a procedure often referred to as "emergency distillation", although it has remained in force for decades. At about the same time, domestic consumption of inexpensive wine started to drop within the larger wine producing countries of Europe, making it even harder to return to the previous state of market equilibrium. From the 1980s, this has meant a marked reduction in the total demand, in terms of quantity, despite the fact that the wine-importing countries of northern Europe have increased their consumption. Increasing wine exports from the New World, often in a style arrived at by market research rather than long tradition, also meant increased competition and changing tastes among wine consumers. As a result, the reduced total demand also included a shift in the demand towards higher quality level. Since it was realised that the vineyards in some locations would be unlikely to yield wines of the necessary quality, increased financial incentives for giving up vineyards, so-called grubbing-up schemes or vine pull schemes, were introduced in the late 1980s. This led to reduced overproduction, but a complete balance has so far never been achieved.

In the mid to late 1990s, much of CAP was overhauled and the legislation was simplified. A major revision was done in 1999, and it has been stated several times since then that the ambition is to phase out interventions such as emergency distillation, since they are "artificial outlets" for wine. However, this aim has proven difficult to achieve.

The latest round of reforms was announced in 2006 and led to agreed legal documents in 2008. Some of the key points were:

- The system of planting rights to be abolished by 2015, with the possibility to keep them on a national level until 2018
- Distillation measures to be phased out after four years (in 2012) with progressively less money allowed to be allocated to these measures for each year.
- A three-year voluntary grubbing-up scheme for up to 175,000 hectares (430,000 acres) of vineyards.
- Introduction of "national financial envelopes" whereby it becomes a national responsibility to choose the right balance of incentives.

Many of the reforms were less sweeping than what had initially been proposed, and the implementation of several items delayed.

== Documents ==
The central document of the EU wine regulations is entitled Council Regulation on the common organisation of the market in wine and it is supplemented by several Commission regulations. The former document has been adopted by the Council of the European Union through the member states' ministers of agriculture, while the Commission regulations are written by the European Commission in collaboration with the Wine Management Committee, where the member states are represented.

== Aspects regulated ==
The aspects regulated by EU fall mainly into the categories winemaking practices, classification and labelling, wine-production potential, documentation of wine industry activities, imports from non-EU countries, and duties of enforcement agencies.

=== Classification and labelling ===
The wines produced in the EU are divided into the two quality categories of table wines (TW) and quality wines produced in specified regions (QWpsr), of which QWpsr is the higher category. Rules for winemaking practices and labelling are different for TW and QWpsr. Similar categories also exist for sparkling wine.

The TW and QWpsr categories are applied to different national wine classifications in each EU member state. Thus, some member states may have more than two levels of classification, but all national levels correspond to either TW or QWpsr and are subject to the common minimum standards set out in the EU wine regulations. As an example, France uses three levels of classification. vin de table and vin de pays are both EU table wines, while appellation d'origine contrôlée (AOC) wines are QWpsr.

- Labelling information is divided into compulsory and optional information. Information not listed as part of either of these two categories may not be displayed on the bottle. To some extent, this information varies with the quality category.
- The labelling regulations include requirements for how grape varieties and vintage may be mentioned on the label.
- Requirements and procedures for protected designations of origin for wine.
- Label indications of sweetness – from dry to sweet – are regulated in terms of which residual sugar levels they correspond to.
- Certain traditional bottle types may only be used for wines of certain origins; these are the bocksbeutel and the clavelin, as well as the flûte d'Alsace, the use of which is only regulated within France.

=== Winemaking practices ===
Perhaps most importantly, the regulations define wine as "the product obtained exclusively from the total or partial alcoholic fermentation of fresh grapes, whether or not crushed, or of grape must". Furthermore, wine can only be made from grape varieties listed as allowed, and only those vine varieties may be planted for commercial purposes. Each EU member state draws up such lists of varieties, which may only contain purebred Vitis vinifera varieties, and certain crosses between V. vinifera and other species of the Vitis genus. Thus, uncrossed so-called American vines, such as Vitis labrusca, may not be used for wine and are not allowed in EU vineyards.

Many winemaking practices depend on the classification of the wine – TW or QWpsr. Some practices also depend on where within EU the grapes are grown, since typical challenges to winemakers in colder or hotter climates are somewhat different. The defined European Union wine growing zones are used to regulate these practices, but some leeway is given for authorising deviations in vintages of exceptional climatic conditions.

- Minimum ripeness of grapes to be used for wine.
- Minimum alcohol content for wine, and maximum alcohol content of non-fortified wine.
- Chaptalisation and related forms of enrichment, the term used by the regulations. An upper limit is set, dependent on the wine growing zone, both on the extent of chaptalisation and the maximum alcohol level that may be achieved by chaptalisation.
- Deacidification, dependent on the wine growing zone.
- The use of sweet reserve (often referred to by its German name, Süßreserve), which is more restricted if the wine is also chaptalised.
- The amount of sulphur dioxide in the wine, the allowable amount of which depends on the colour and sweetness of wine.

== EU regulations and national wine laws ==
The reason why these regulations exist on the EU level is because of the common market inside the EU, which has led to a need to harmonise regulations for various products which traditionally have been regulated on a national level. The EU wine regulations form a framework for the wine laws of the European Union member states. Since national wine laws have a much longer history than the EU wine regulations, the EU regulations have been designed to accommodate existing regulations of several member states. In particular, the existing regulations concerning French wine, with its detailed appellation laws, formed a basis, while also making room for the very different German wine classification system. In general, the EU wine regulations provide for minimum standards across EU, while making it possible for individual member states to enact stricter standards in certain areas in their national wine laws.

An example comparing a French and two German wine types made from the same grape variety illustrate what the EU wine regulations stipulate, and how the individual countries have applied various stricter regulations than the minimum for these "quality wines".

| Regulated aspect | EU regulation (minimum standard) | France: Alsace AOC labelled "Riesling" | German: Riesling Qualitätswein ("QbA") | German: Riesling Prädikatswein (e.g. a Kabinett) |
|---|---|---|---|---|
| Grape varieties | If the label indicates a single variety, minimum 85% of that variety | 100% Riesling required | Minimum 85% Riesling | Minimum 85% Riesling |
| Minimum grape maturity required | Depends on wine growing zone. For Zone A (most of Germany), 5% potential alcohol, for zone B (much of France including Alsace), 6% potential alcohol. | Minimum 8.5% potential alcohol | Minimum grape maturity depends on the wine region, but is at least 6% potential alcohol (50 °Oe) | Minimum grape maturity depends on the Prädikat and the wine region, but is at least 8.7% potential alcohol (67 °Oe) |
| Chaptalisation | Maximum amount of chaptalisation depends on wine growing zone. For Zone A, corresponding to 3% additional alcohol, for zone B, 2%. | Generally allowed up to 2%, but the regional committee may set a lower limit for a certain vintage | Chaptalisation allowed up to the maximum, up to 2% additional alcohol in Baden (zone B) and 3% in the other regions (zone A) | No chaptalisation allowed for any Prädikatswein |

In a sense, the EU wine regulations as such are rather invisible to the wine consumers and the wine trade, since the details of quality classifications and labelling practices are generally part of the national wine laws, which provide the visible front-end.

== See also ==
- Irrigation in viticulture
