= Spätlese =

German late harvest wine

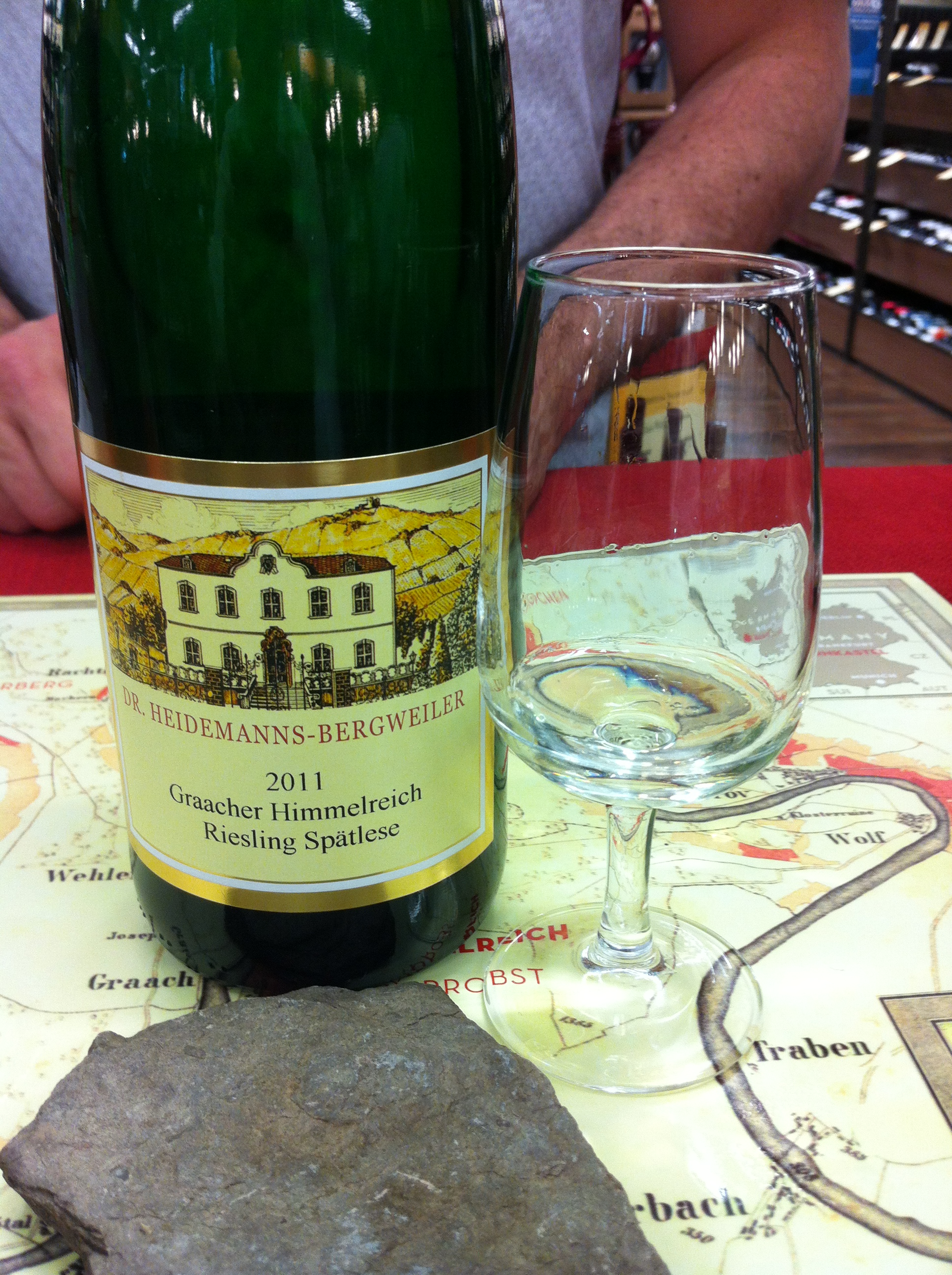
A Spätlese level wine from the Mosel

Spätlese (German pronunciation: [ˈʃpɛːtˌleːzə], literal meaning: "late harvest"; plural form is Spätlesen) is a German wine term for a wine from fully ripe grapes, the lightest of the late harvest wines. Spätlese is a riper category than Kabinett in the Prädikatswein category of the German wine classification and is the lowest level of Prädikatswein in Austria, where Kabinett is classified in another way. In both cases, Spätlese is below Auslese in terms of ripeness. The grapes are picked at least seven days after normal harvest, so they are riper and have a higher sugar content. Because of the weather, waiting to pick the grapes later carries a risk of the crop being ruined by rain. However, in warm years and from good sites much of the harvest will reach Spätlese level.

The wines may be either sweet or dry; it is a level of ripeness that particularly suits rich dry wines from Riesling, Weißer Burgunder, and Grauer Burgunder grapes for example, as at Auslese levels the alcohol levels may become very high in a dry wine, leaving the wine unbalanced, making wines with at least some residual sweetness preferable to most palates. However, most German wines are traditionally dry, and the amount of sugar is not the only factor balancing a wine. Dry German wines can be very balanced, and usually get higher ratings from German wine journalists than a comparable wine with more sugar.

Many Spätlese wines will age well, especially those made from the Riesling grape.

== Characteristics ==
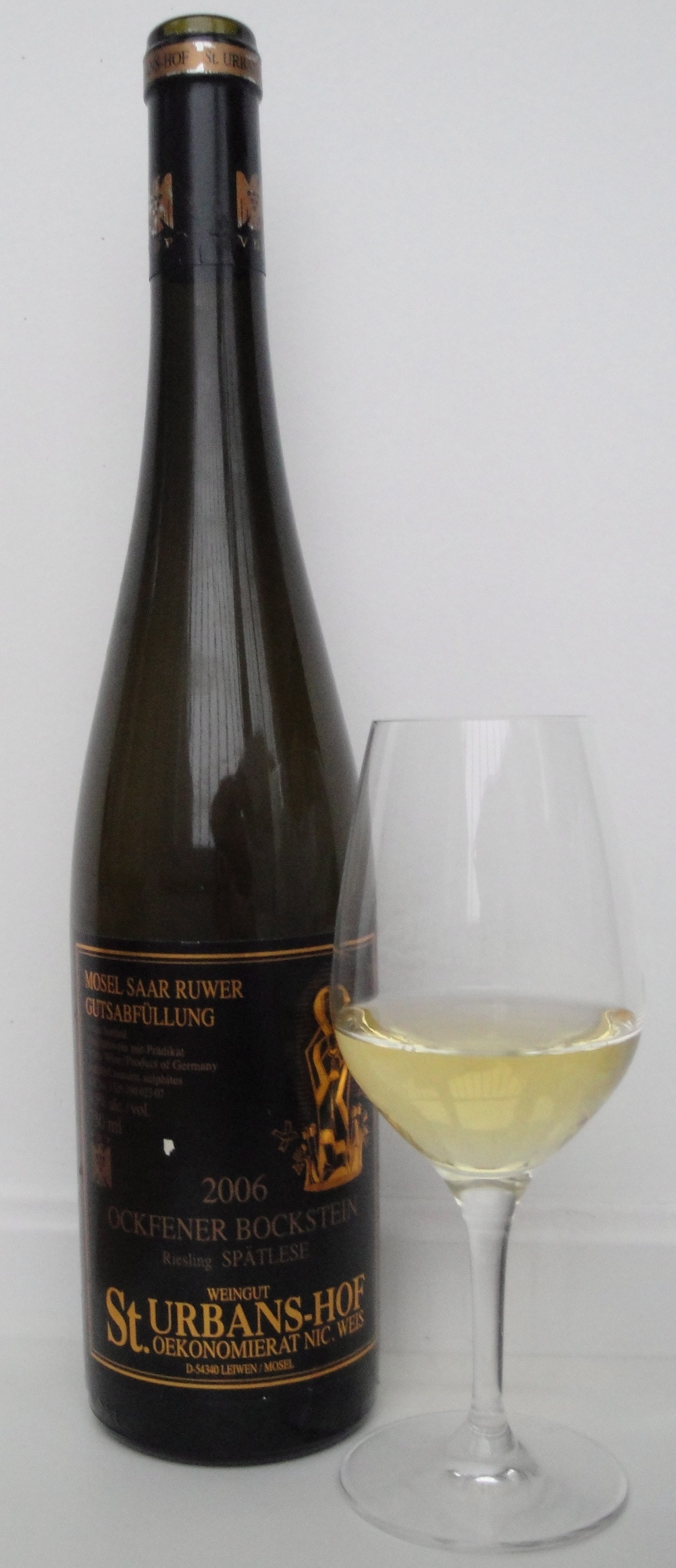
A Riesling Spätlese from the Moselle

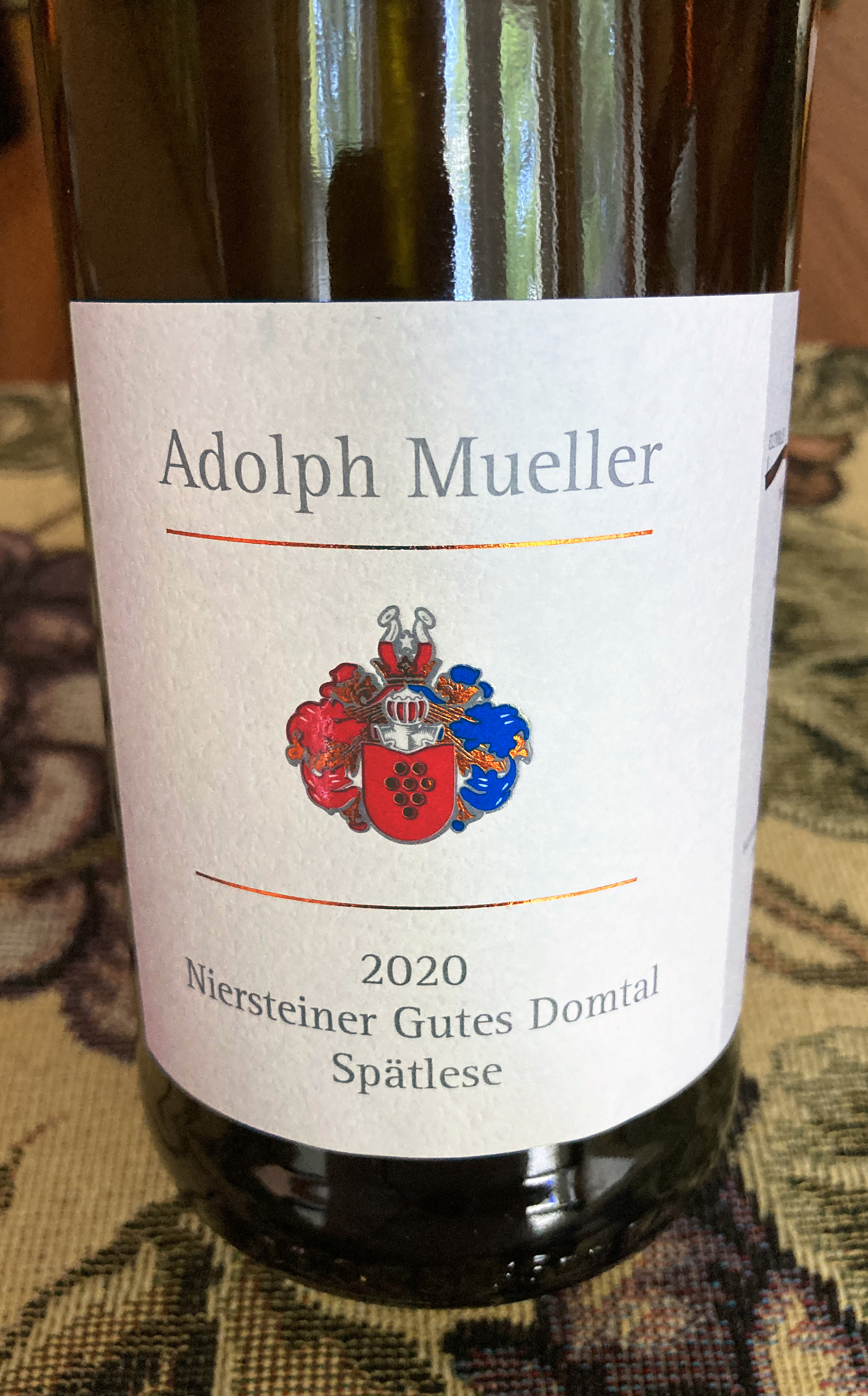
A German Spätlese-level wine, produced from vineyards near Nierstein in Rheinhessen

- Greater intensity and strength than Kabinett
- High level of acidity that curbs any overt sweetness
- Fleshy and intensely flavored
- Often tastes of apple, pear and honeysuckle
- Elegant nose with highly detectable aromas

== Requirements ==
The minimum must weight requirements for Spätlese are as follows:

- In German wine, 76 to 90 degrees Oechsle, depending on the region (wine growing zone) and grape variety.
- In Austrian wine, 19 degrees KMW, corresponding to 95 °Oechsle.

Chaptalisation may not be used. The requirements are part of the wine law in both countries. Many producers, especially top-level producers, regularly exceed the minimum requirements.

== History ==
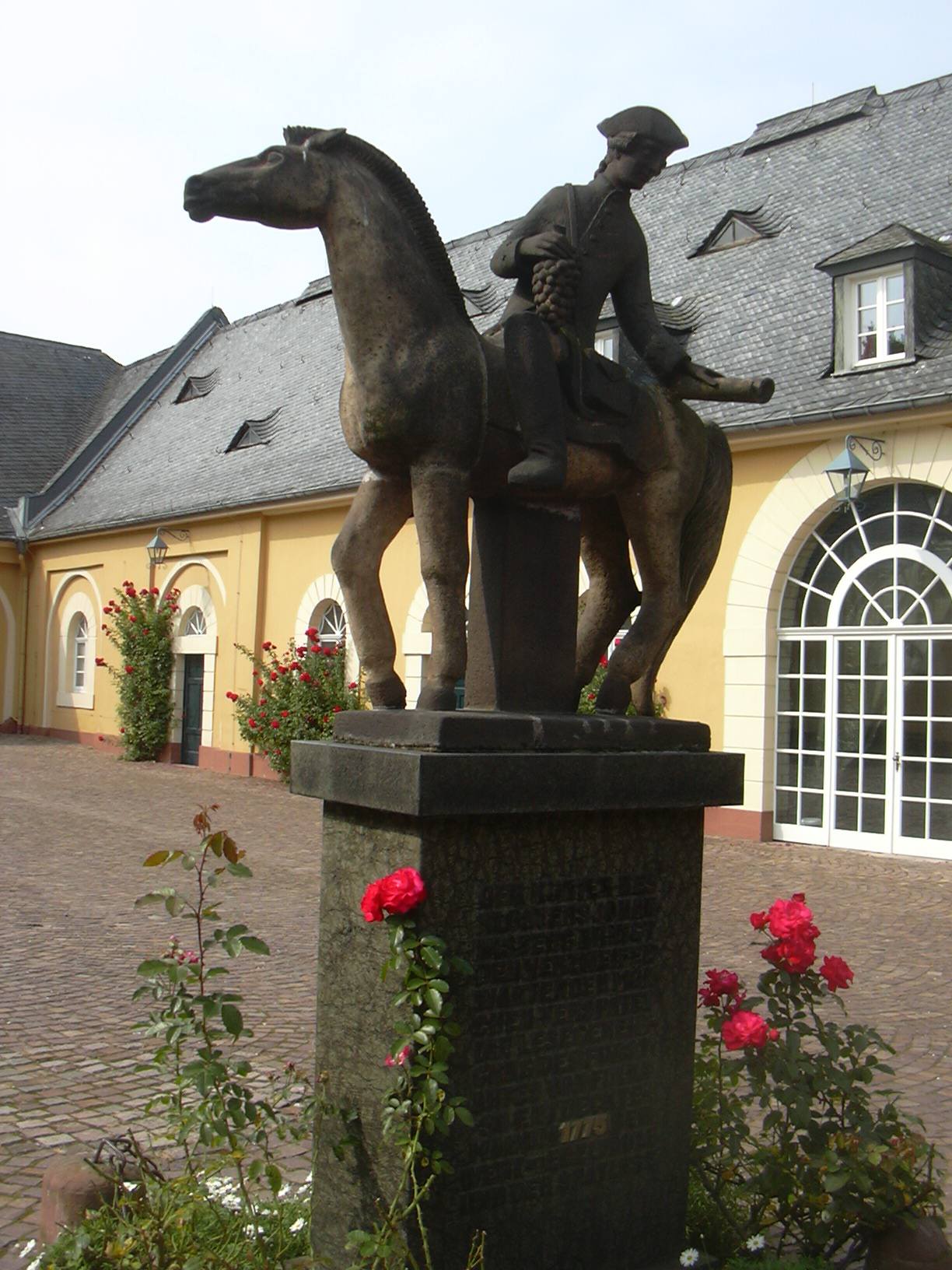
Statue of the Spätlese courier in the courtyard of Schloss Johannisberg

=== The Spätlese courier at Schloss Johannisberg ===
Legend has it that the introduction of the Spätlese category took place in the Rheingau winery Schloss Johannisberg in 1775, and happened by mere circumstance. Since 1718, permission to start harvest at Johannisberg was announced in writing from the Prince-Bishop of Fulda by means of a so-called autumn courier – Herbstkurier. In 1775, for some reason, the courier sent out by the abbey at Fulda was delayed for 14 days. According to some, the abbey's messenger was robbed on the way to bring the official harvest picking order. By the time the order finally arrived noble rot had set in, but the harvest was carried out anyway, although no high hopes were staked on the wine from the rotten grapes. But rather than a failed product, the wine turned out to be surprisingly good. Schloss Johannisberg began actively seeking to produce late harvest – Spätlese – wines affected by noble rot. The delayed courier therefore became referred to as the Spätlesereiter.

In 1778 Thomas Jefferson tasted a bottle of Spätlese that was given to him and was so impressed that he advised friends who were in Europe to go to the Rheingau to experience the wines and bring a case back to America.

=== Additional Prädikat levels ===
Terminology for different levels of late harvest wines, based on grape selection, were then introduced starting with Auslese ("Select harvest") being introduced in 1787, and additional levels added later. The key to these developments was selection of bunches and grapes by level of ripeness and botrytis, thus giving different wines from the same vineyard.

Therefore, the initial Spätlese terminology was for any late harvest wine, and the initial 1775 Spätlese wine was made from grapes that were affected by noble rot to the extent that they appeared unpalatable, and gave a very sweet wine. Such a wine would not really correspond to a modern-day Spätlese. Grapes of this character, vinified by themselves would rather give a Beerenauslese in modern terminology, and if bunches of such botrytis-affected grapes were mixed with more or less healthy bunches, it seems likely that the wine would be classed in the upper end of the Auslese range.

=== Later history ===
In the 1971 German wine law, the Spätlese Prädikat was given its present interpretation. In the early post-World War II era, the semi-sweet wines that Germany for long has been associated with became more common, since new methods by stopping fermentation and using Süssreserve were introduced. The Spätlese wines represents the "high end" of these semi-sweet, rather than fully sweet, wines, since they are not allowed to be chaptalized.

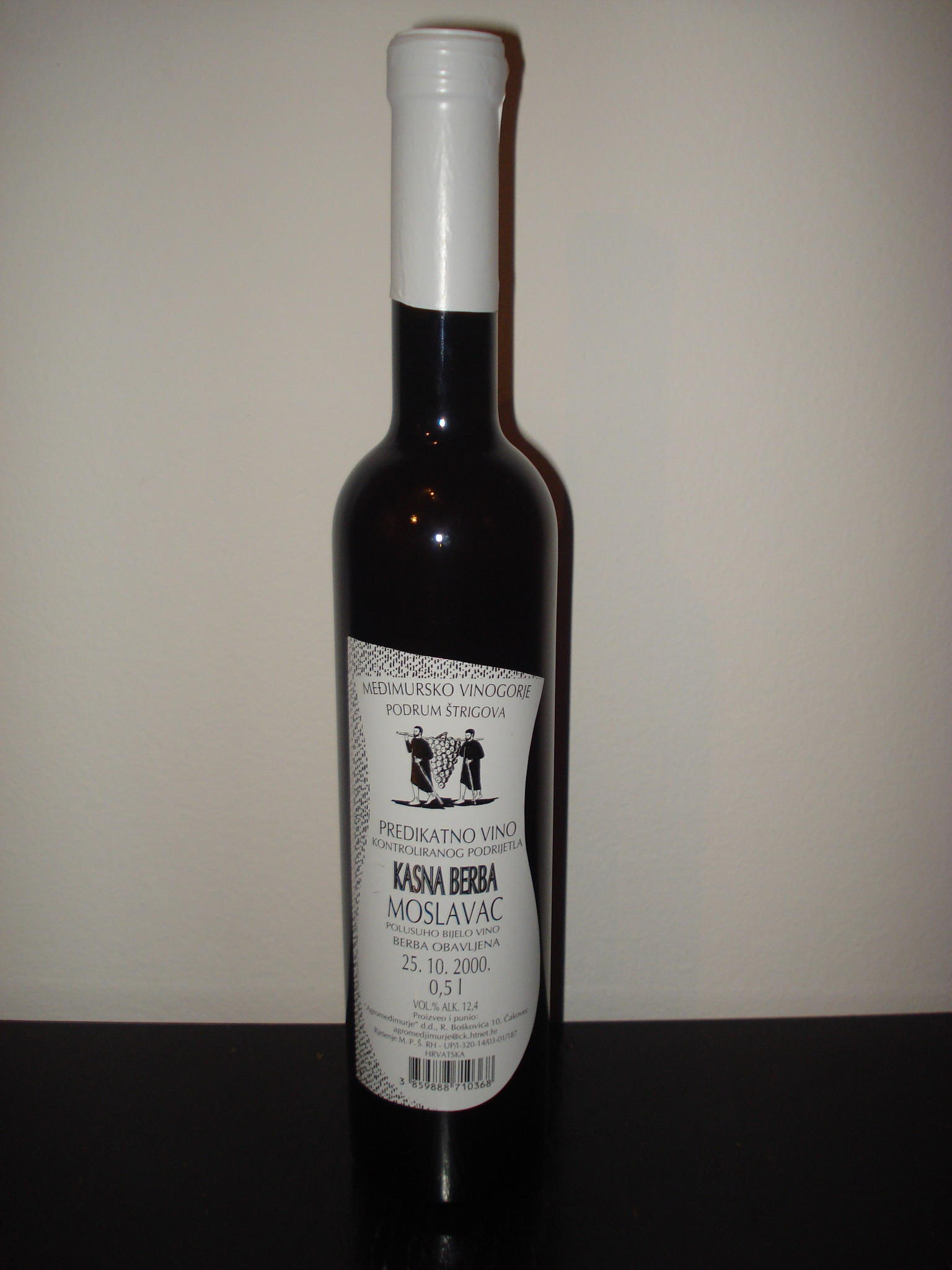
A bottle of late harvest Moslavac wine from Međimurje County, northern Croatia

From the 1980s, and even more from the 1990s, production of dry wines became much more common in Germany. Thus, wines designated "Spätlese trocken" in many cases came to represent the best dry wines from many wineries. From the early 2000s, the new designations Grosses Gewächs and Erstes Gewächs have become more common, with the result that remaining Spätlese trocken wines rather represents the second-best dry wines.

In Austria, which largely abandoned the semi-sweet wine category in the wake of the 1985 diethylene glycol scandal in order to concentrate more on dry wines, Spätlese wines are much less common than in Germany.

== See also ==
- Vendange tardive
