= Ferdinand Oechsle =

Christian Ferdinand Oechsle (December 26, 1774 – March 17, 1852) was a German mechanical workshop owner, goldsmith and inventor.

He is most noted for developing a method for measuring the must weight of the grape must in winemaking. The Oechsle scale, named after him and divided into degrees Oechsle (°Oe), is still used for official classification of German wine, Swiss wine and Luxembourg wine.

== Biography ==
Oechsle was born in Buhlbach at Baiersbronn in the northern part of the Black Forest area, the son of Israel Oechsle, a master glass blower, and Christina Juditha Lieb. As a boy, he went to school there. Towards the end of the 1780s he was apprenticed to a goldsmith and jeweler in Öhringen (Württemberg), followed by some itinerant years. In 1800 he became a master cabinet maker at a jewellery factory in Pforzheim.

In 1810 he founded a mechanical workshop in Pforzheim and among other things manufactured precision beam balances and physical and hydrostatic equipment for laboratories and universities, as well as musical instruments. In 1820 the Grand Duchy of Baden appointed him official gold inspector. In 1829 he developed a safe oxyhydrogen equipment for soldering, and was at this time also operating a liquor distillery.

Oechsle died in Pforzheim, aged 77.

== The must balance ==
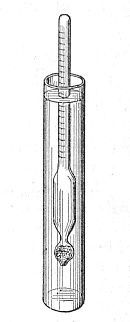
A hydrometer showing the hydrometry principle. The hydrometer in the image is of the more common glass type, while Oechsle produced metal versions.

In the 1820s Oechsle produced the first single copies of the must balance (hydrometer) with a scale in degrees. He realised that if it would be possible to measure the sugar content of the must, it should be possible to better predict the development of the resulting wine. From the 1830s, Oechsle must balances were mass-produced.

Oechsle did actually not invent the must balance as such; different versions by different manufacturers had existed beginning more than 250 years previous. What he did do was to introduce a practically useful scale on the balance, and to put the balance into mass production.

Oechsle's hydrometers were made out of metal, typically nickel silver; the hollow body of the float was typically gilt.

When Oechsle started mass-producing his hydrometers, sweet wines from very ripe grapes were established as the top echelon of German wines since a few decades. This development followed the accidental discovery of the first Spätlese wine in 1775, and the introduction of the Auslese designation in 1787. It was therefore attractive to winemakers to be able to easily measure and classify the sugar content of the grape musts.

== Personal life ==
Oechsle married Karoline Wilhelmine Friederike Gmelin (born February 18, 1778) on December 8, 1803 and they had five children.

== Publications ==
- Über den Gebrauch der Most- und Weinwaage ("On the use of must and wine balances"), 1836
- Praktische Anleitung zum Berechnen der Goldlegierung ... ("Practical manual for calculating gold alloys..."), 1844
- Kleines Handbuch für Goldarbeiter ("Small handbook for goldworkers"), 1860
