= Reserve wine =

Wine of a higher quality than usual

Reserve wine is wine of a higher quality than usual, a wine that has been aged before sale, or both. Traditionally, winemakers would reserve some of their best wine rather than sell it immediately, coining the term.

In some countries the use of the term "reserve", "reserva" or "riserva" is regulated, but in many places it is not. According to Italian wine laws, riserva indicates additional aging. Sometimes, reserve wine originates from the best vineyards, or the best barrels. Reserve wines may be made in a style suited to longer aging periods. In regions where the use is not regulated, the presence of the term "reserve" on a wine label may be a marketing strategy, without specific criteria. In Kendall-Jackson Chardonnay, every bottle produced is "Vintner's Reserve", and to indicate a traditional reserve wine, Kendall-Jackson uses the term "Grand Reserve".

Like the term "old vines", "reserve" traditionally indicates a wine that is special, or at least different in flavor or aging potential. The presence of a non-reserve bottling with a producer that also sells reserve wine makes it more likely that "reserve" is used in its traditional sense. Partly because of the often vague meaning of "reserve", many wineries produce named cuvées instead. Typically these are reserve wines in the traditional meaning of the word.

== Iberia ==
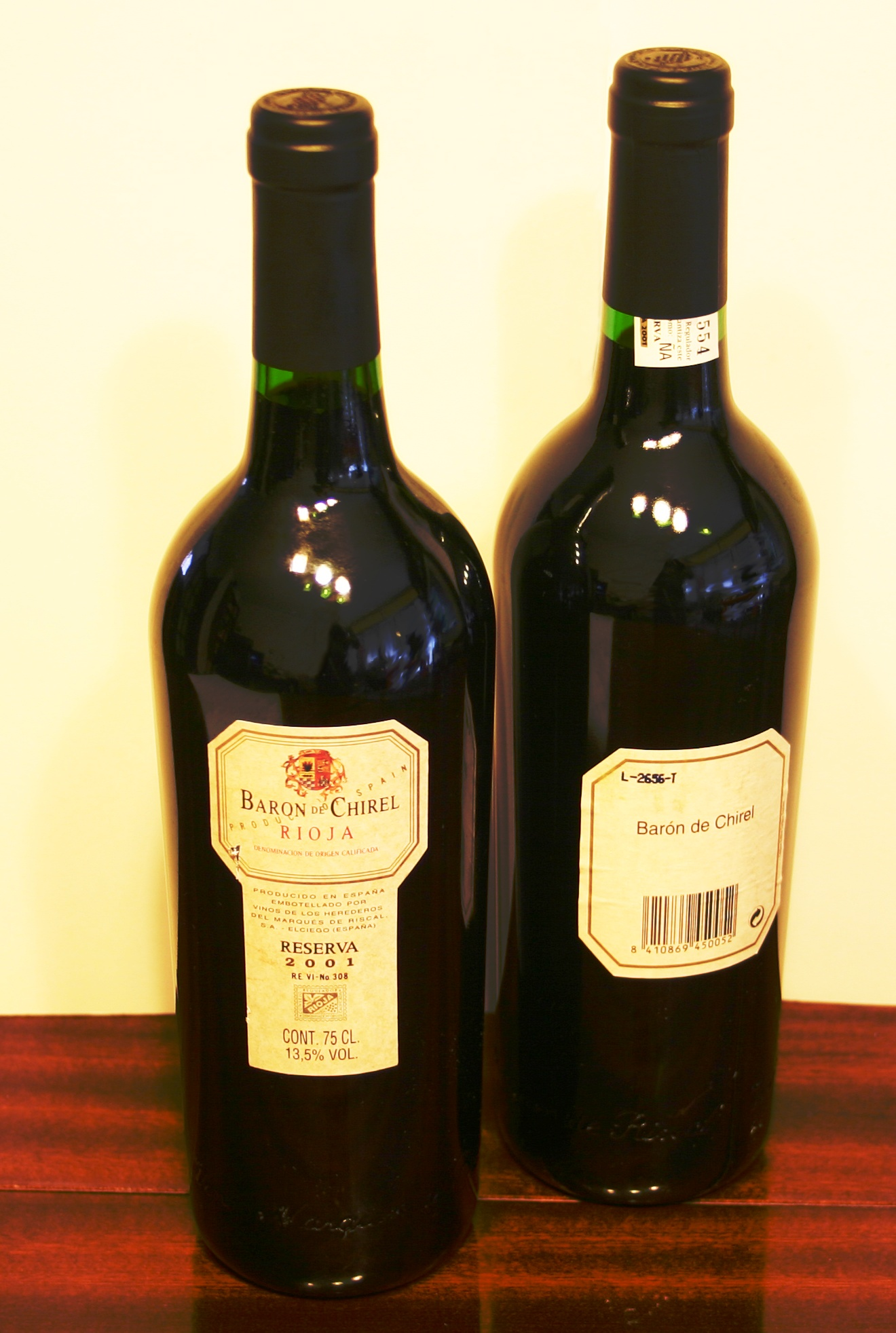
Bottles of Rioja Reserva

In Spain, reserva is a regulated term controlled by law, at least ensuring that reserve wines get some additional aging. In practice it is very difficult to regulate quality, so the term primarily deals with ageing and alcoholic strength. In Spanish wines, the requirements varies between regions, but typically, when used on a label "Reserva" means that the wine was aged for at least three years in the cask and bottle, at least one of which must have been in the cask.

Those that have been aged for five years (two in cask, three in bottle) or more are labelled Gran Reserva. Gran Reservas are intended to be made only in exceptional vintages, but this is up to the producer.

In Portugal the term indicates that the wine has an alcohol level of at least 0.5 percent above the regional minimum, and that it was made from a rated vintage.

== Champagne ==
In the production of "non-vintage" Champagne, a certain amount of aged still wine is used for blending with still wine of the youngest vintage, before this blended base wine undergoes second fermentation in bottle to become sparkling Champagne. This aged still wine is called reserve wine, and this practice is meant to ensure that a certain Champagne house's non-vintage product has a consistent style over the years. Since the reserve wine is used in the production process, it is not bottled and sold as it is, but the proportion and age of the reserve wine can contribute to the quality of a Champagne.

== Austrian DACs ==
In the Austrian Districtus Austriae Controllatus (DAC) system, most DACs have an additional Reserve designation for a wine which has slightly more strict requirements.

== German Kabinett ==
Before the 1971 German wine law, a term corresponding to reserve wine existed in kabinett, sometimes written as Kabinettwein. In 1971, the similar-sounding term Kabinett was instead introduced as the lowest level of the Prädikatswein category, i.e., with a completely different meaning. Therefore, in the present German wine classification no legally defined term corresponding to reserve wine exists.

== See also ==
- Second wine
- Vintage port
