= Findling =

Variety of grape

Findling is a white German wine grape variety that arose from a mutation of Müller-Thurgau plantings in the Mosel wine region. Compared to Müller-Thurgau, Findling produces grapes of higher must weights, which is an important consideration in the German wine classification system. However, according to wine expert Jancis Robinson, the grape produces wine of average to low quality and is susceptible to various grape rot infections.
