= Kabinett =

German wine term

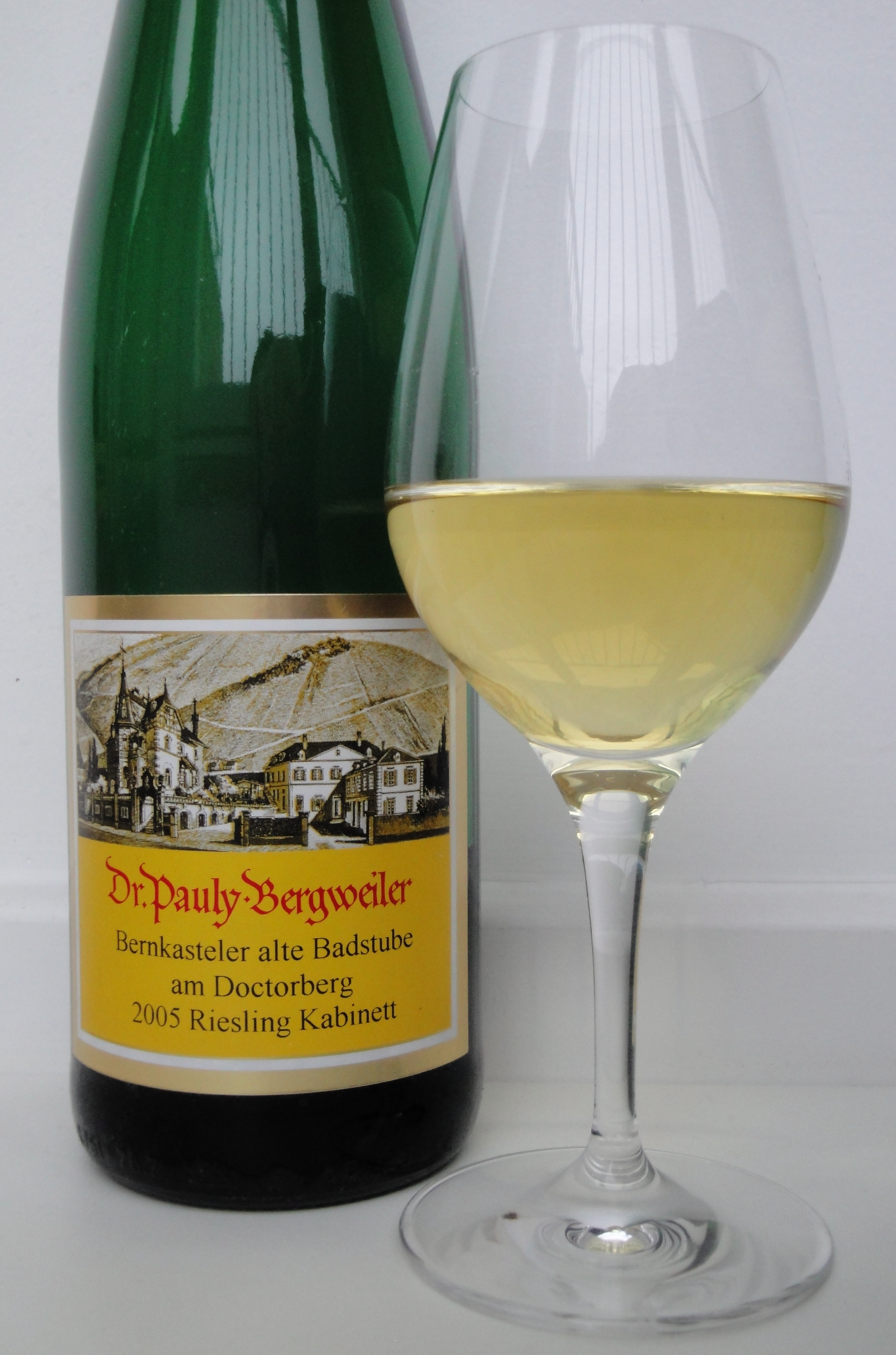
A riesling kabinett from Mosel

The word kabinett (German pronunciation: [kabiˈnɛt], literal meaning: cabinet), or sometimes kabinettwein (German pronunciation: [kabiˈnɛtˌvaɪn], literal meaning: a wine set aside in a cabinet), is a German language wine term for a wine made from fully ripened grapes of the main harvest, typically picked in September, and are usually made in a light style. In the German wine classification system, kabinett is the lowest level of prädikatswein, lower in ripeness than spätlese.

In Austria, kabinett is subcategory of qualitätswein rather than a prädikatswein, and the term always designates a dry wine.

In the Czech Republic, kabinet is a category of Quality wine with predicate (Czech: Jakostní víno s přívlastkem). Wines of this style are usually light and dry.

== History ==
The term kabinett, also known as cabinet, originally implied a wine of superior quality, set aside for later sale—essentially the German version of the wine term reserve. The term originated with the Cistercian monks at Eberbach Abbey in Rheingau, where the first recorded use of the term Cabinet occurred in 1712. The abbey set their best wines aside, storing them in a special cellar they built built in 1245. The cellar later became known as the Cabinet cellar, or Cabinet-Keller. However, records also say that Schloss Vollrads, a winery in the nearby town of Oestrich-Winkel built the first official cabinet cellar in 1716—and no evidence shows Eberbach Abbey ordering its own cabinet cellar until 1739.

Before 1971, the term cabinet or kabinett often followed the name of the grape varietal, for example, a wine might be a trockenbeerenauslese cabinet. The term is superfluous under current German wine law, though it still appears on older bottles.

In 1971, German wine law officially noted the term kabinett, and gave it its current definition, which applies to wines that are light and non-chaptalized. Kabinett's current definition differs greatly from its etymological implications of being a reserve wine. Before 1971, vintners used the terms naturwein (natural wine) or natuerrein (naturally pure) in place of kabinett. These terms designated non-chaptalized wine, where no other designations, such as spätlese or auslese, applied.

== Requirements ==
=== German definition ===
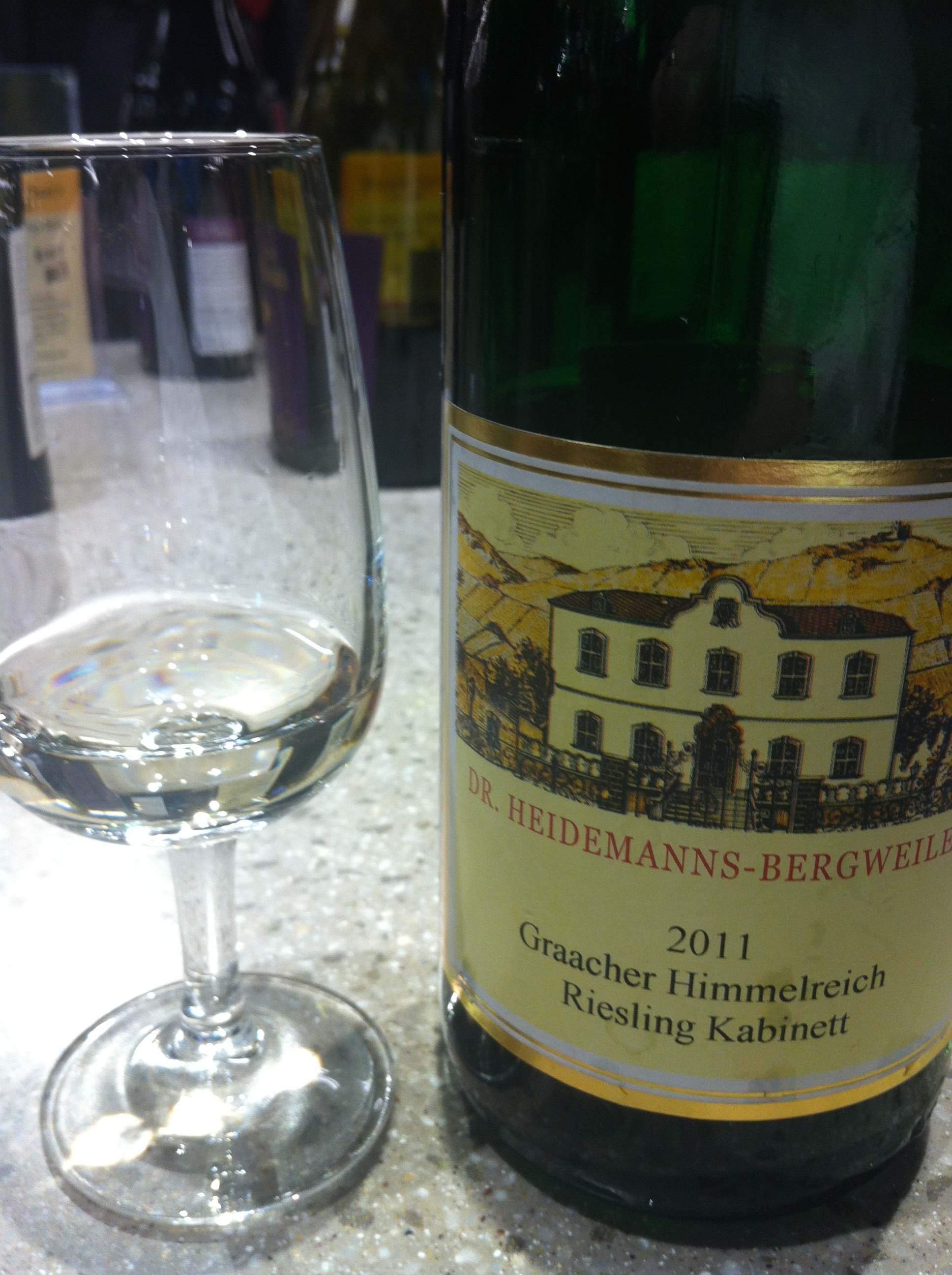
A kabinett-level German Riesling from the Mosel

The minimum requirements under current wine law to label a wine kabinett are:

- The wine must have a must density between 67 and 82 degrees Oechsle, depending on the region (wine growing zone) and grape variety.
- The wine must not undergo chaptalisation.

=== Austrian definition ===
The minimum requirements, under current Austrian wine law to label a wine kabinett are:

- The wine must have a minimum must density of 17 degrees KMW (equal to 85 °Oechsle).
- The alcohol content may not exceed 13% ABV.
- The residual sugar content must not exceed 9 grams per liter.
- The wine must not undergo chaptalisation—a notable exception from the rules for other Qualitätsweine.

=== Czech definition ===
The minimum requirements, under current Czech wine law, to label a wine Kabinet are:

- The wine must be produced from grapes grown within a single defined wine sub-region.
- The wine must have a minimum must density of 19 °NM (equal to 84 °Oechsle).
- The wine must not undergo chaptalisation.

== Style ==
Since kabinett wines may not be chaptalized, in contrast with other Qualitätswein (QbA), they tend to possess the lowest alcohol content of all German wines, despite the fact the requirements are more stringent than other QbA.

Kabinett wines are often noted for a pronounced light and elegant character when from colder German wine regions, such as Mosel, and in wines made from the grape variety riesling (which dominates much of the coldest German regions).

Typically, a riesling kabinett from Mosel exhibits a high acidity, with floral aromas, and often hints of slate and minerality. In cooler regions, semi-sweet kabinett wines have an alcohol content of around 7-8% ABV and dry kabinett wines are usually around 10-11% ABV. When made in other regions, or from other grape varieties, this can vary. For example, a dry kabinett made in Baden or the Palatinate made from a pinot varietal may well have an alcohol content of 13% ABV.

Typical German kabinett wines are usually best enjoyed when aged for between one and five years. However, some better examples can be cellared for over a decade.
