= German classification =

German classification may refer to:

- German wine classification
- UIC classification of locomotive axle arrangements, German axle classification of locomotives
