= German system =

German system may refer to:

- Continental education system
- German wine classification system
- UIC classification of locomotive axle arrangements, also known as German classification
