= Trocken =

Classification of wine

Trocken, German for dry, is a classification of German wine that indicates a wine that is dry rather than off-dry (halbtrocken), sweeter (lieblich) or sweet (süß). Trocken wines are not devoid of residual sugar, but have, at most, a few grams per liter, which can be perceptible but is not overtly sweet. Trocken is also a designation for Austrian wine, but more rarely used there than in Germany, since many quality categories of Austrian wines are dry by default.

Somewhat confusingly, for Sekt and other sparkling wines, trocken indicates a higher level of sugar than it does for non-sparkling wines. A Sekt trocken is best described as off-dry or semi-sweet, while a Sekt brut is completely dry.

== Requirements ==
The maximum amount of sugar allowed for a trocken designation depends on the level of acid in the wine. For wine low in acid, a maximum of 4 grams per liter (0.00014 lb/cu in) sugar is allowed. If the acid level exceeds 2 grams per liter (7.2×10^{−5} lb/cu in), the sugar may exceed the acid level by 2 grams per liter, up to a maximum sugar content of 9 grams per liter (0.00033 lb/cu in). Most high-quality German white wines have a high enough acidity to be allowed up to 9 grams per liter of sugar under the trocken level. When used, the requirements in Austria are exactly the same.

=== Sparkling wines ===
When used for sparkling wine, the term trocken means a sugar content of 17 to 35 grams per liter (0.00061 to 0.00126 lb/cu in). This parallels the term sec ("dry") in French, which indicates a sparkling wine of the same sugar level as trocken. Drier wines are designated extra trocken at 12 to 20 grams per liter (0.00043 to 0.00072 lb/cu in), while completely dry sparkling wines are given the designation brut (0–15 g/L) or extra brut (0–6 g/L).

== Background ==
Until the invention of sterile filtration, most German wines were dry. Fermentation continued until all the sugar was consumed, leaving only miscellaneous unfermentable sugars. Only the occasional sweet rarity, made from extremely ripe grapes, kept any residual sugar. For most of the twentieth century, the style was typically sweeter low-alcohol wines. Only since about 1990 has trocken wine become popular, partly because many prefer it with food. Most exported German wine is still of the sweeter styles. While it appears in the term trockenbeerenauslese, trocken in that case refers to the dried grapes, not the dryness of the resulting wine.
