= Flash release =

Technique in wine pressing

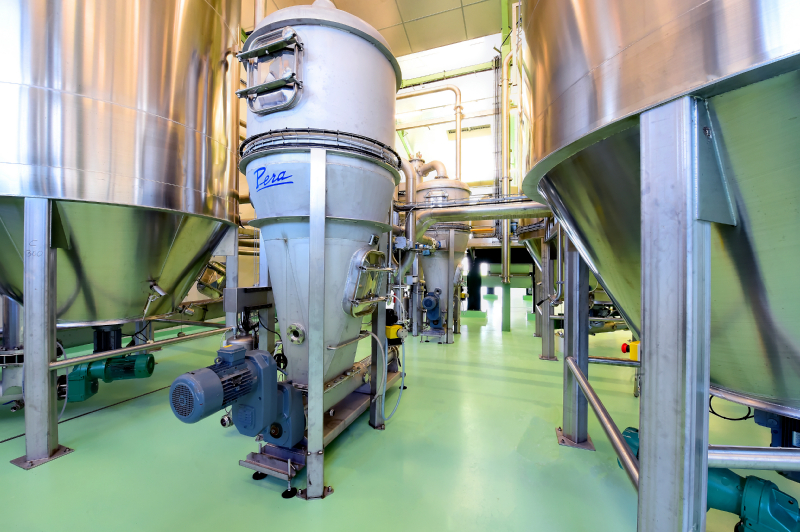
Thermovinification - Flash Release

Flash release (FR) is a technique used in wine pressing. The technique allows for a better extraction of phenolic compounds and wine polysaccharides.

The treatment consists of heating the grapes at 95 °C (203 °F) for several minutes with vapour and then submitting them to a strong vacuum.

The technique can be applied to other type of juice extraction.
