= Oechsle scale =

Hydrometer scale measuring the density of grape must

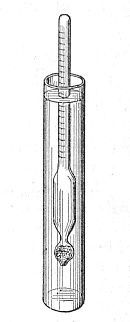
A hydrometer

The Oechsle scale is a hydrometer scale measuring the density of grape must, which is an indication of grape ripeness and sugar content used in wine-making. It is named for Ferdinand Oechsle (1774–1852) and it is widely used in the German, Swiss and Luxembourgish wine-making industries. On the Oechsle scale, one degree Oechsle (°Oe) corresponds to one gram of the difference between the mass of one litre of must at 20 °C and 1 kg (the mass of 1 litre of water). For example, must with a specific mass of 1084 grams per litre has 84 °Oe.

== Overview ==
The mass difference between equivalent volumes of must and water is almost entirely due to the dissolved sugar in the must. Since the alcohol in wine is produced by fermentation of the sugar, the Oechsle scale is used to predict the maximal possible alcohol content of the finished wine. This measure is commonly used to select when to harvest grapes. In the vineyard, the must density is usually measured by using a refractometer by crushing a few grapes between the fingers and letting the must drip onto the glass prism of the refractometer. In countries using the Oechsle scale, the refractometer will be calibrated in Oechsle degrees, but this is an indirect reading, as the refractometer actually measures the refractive index of the grape must, and translates it into Oechsle or different wine must scales, based on their relationship with refractive index.

== Wine classification ==
The Oechsle scale forms the basis of most of the German wine classification. In the highest quality category, Prädikatswein (formerly known as Qualitätswein mit Prädikat, QmP), the wine is assigned a Prädikat based on the Oechsle reading of the must. The regulations set out minimum Oechsle readings for each Prädikat, which depend on wine-growing regions and grape variety:

Kabinett – 70–85 °Oe
Spätlese – 76–95 °Oe
Auslese – 83–105 °Oe
Beerenauslese and Eiswein – 110–128° Oe (Eiswein is made by late harvesting grapes after they have frozen on the vine and not necessarily affected by noble rot, botrytis, which is the case with Beerenauslese)
Trockenbeerenauslese – 150–154 °Oe (affected by botrytis)

The sugar content indicated by the Oechsle scale only refers to the unfermented grape must, never to the finished wine.

== Other scales ==
In Austria the Klosterneuburger Mostwaage (KMW) scale is used. The scale is divided into Klosterneuburger Zuckergrade (°KMW), and very similar to the Oechsle scale (1° KMW =~ 5° Oe). However, the KMW measures the exact sugar content of the must.

The Baumé scale is occasionally used in France and by U.S. brewers, and in the New World the Brix scale is used to describe the readings of a refractometer when measuring the sugar content of a given sample.

Since a refractometer actually measures the refractive index of the grape must, it can be translated to many different scales (both related and unrelated to wine) based on their correlation to refractive index. Thus, all of these methods are similar and the differences are more cultural than significant, but all are equally valid ways to measure the density of grape must and other sugar-based liquids.

The Normalizovaný Moštomer (°NM) measures kg of sugar in 100 L of must and is used in Czech Republic and Slovakia.

== See also ==
- Sweetness of wine
- Ripeness in viticulture
