= Sugars in wine =

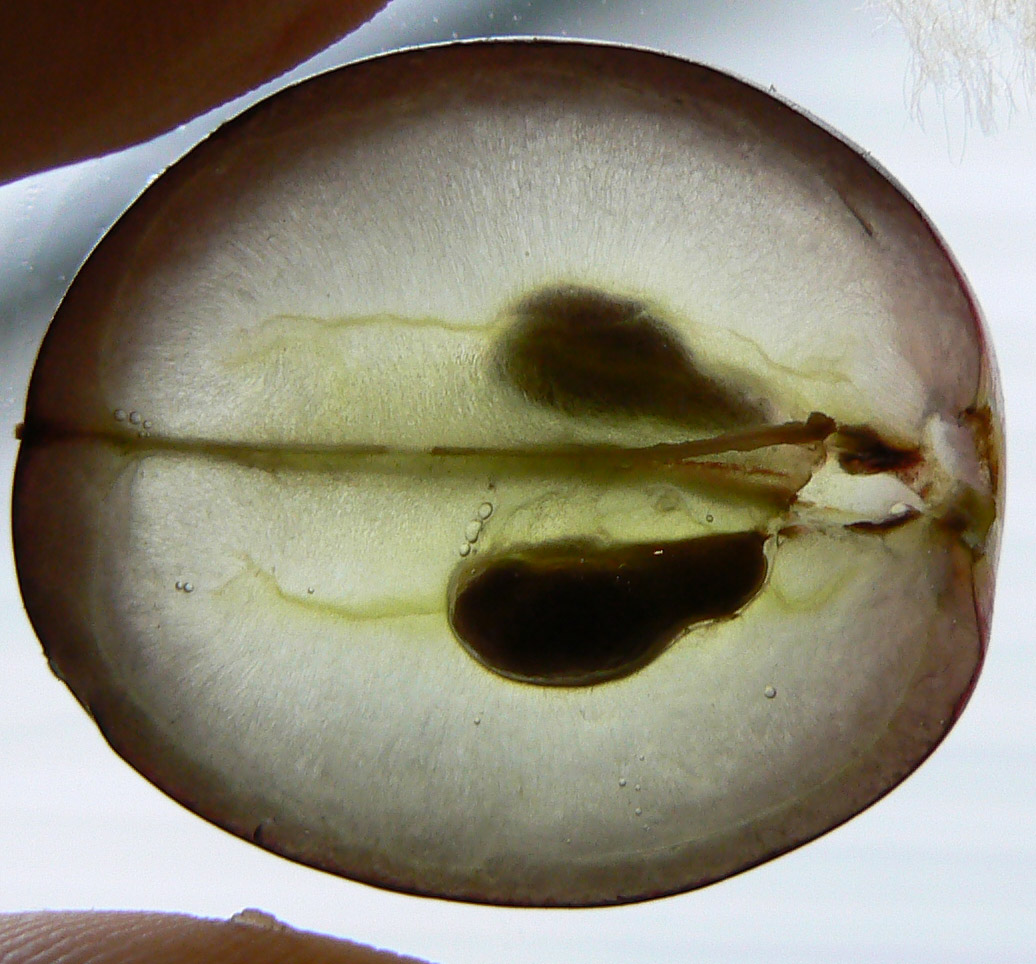
The sugars in grapes are stored in the pulp along with water, organic acids and other compounds

Sugars in wine are at the heart of what makes winemaking possible. During the process of fermentation, sugars from wine grapes are broken down and converted by yeast into alcohol (ethanol) and carbon dioxide. Grapes accumulate sugars as they grow on the grapevine through the translocation of sucrose molecules that are produced by photosynthesis from the leaves. During ripening the sucrose molecules are hydrolyzed (separated) by the enzyme invertase into glucose and fructose. By the time of harvest, between 15 and 25% of the grape will be composed of simple sugars. Both glucose and fructose are six-carbon sugars but three-, four-, five- and seven-carbon sugars are also present in the grape. Not all sugars are fermentable, with sugars like the five-carbon arabinose, rhamnose and xylose still being present in the wine after fermentation. Very high sugar content will effectively kill the yeast once a certain (high) alcohol content is reached. For these reasons, no wine is ever fermented completely "dry" (meaning without any residual sugar). Sugar's role in dictating the final alcohol content of the wine (and such its resulting body and "mouth-feel") sometimes encourages winemakers to add sugar (usually sucrose) during winemaking in a process known as chaptalization solely in order to boost the alcohol content – chaptalization does not increase the sweetness of a wine.

== Sucrose ==
Sucrose is a disaccharide, a molecule composed of the two monosaccharides glucose, and fructose. Invertase is the enzyme cleaves the glycosidic linkage between the glucose and fructose molecules.

In most wines, there will be very little sucrose, since it is not a natural constituent of grapes and sucrose added for the purpose of chaptalisation will be consumed in the fermentation. The exception to this rule is Champagne and other sparkling wines, to which an amount of liqueur d'expédition (typically sucrose dissolved in a still wine) is added after the second fermentation in bottle, a practice known as dosage.

=== Glucose ===
Glucose, along with fructose, is one of the primary sugars found in wine grapes. In wine, glucose tastes less sweet than fructose. It is a six-carbon sugar molecule derived from the breakdown of sucrose. At the beginning of the ripening stage there is usually more glucose than fructose present in the grape (as much as five times more) but the rapid development of fructose shifts the ratio to where at harvest there are generally equal amounts. Grapes that are overripe, such as some late harvest wines, may have more fructose than glucose. During fermentation, yeast cells break down and convert glucose first. The linking of glucose molecules with aglycone, in a process that creates glycosides, also plays a role in the resulting flavor of the wine due to their relation and interactions with phenolic compounds like anthocyanins and terpenoids.

=== Fructose ===
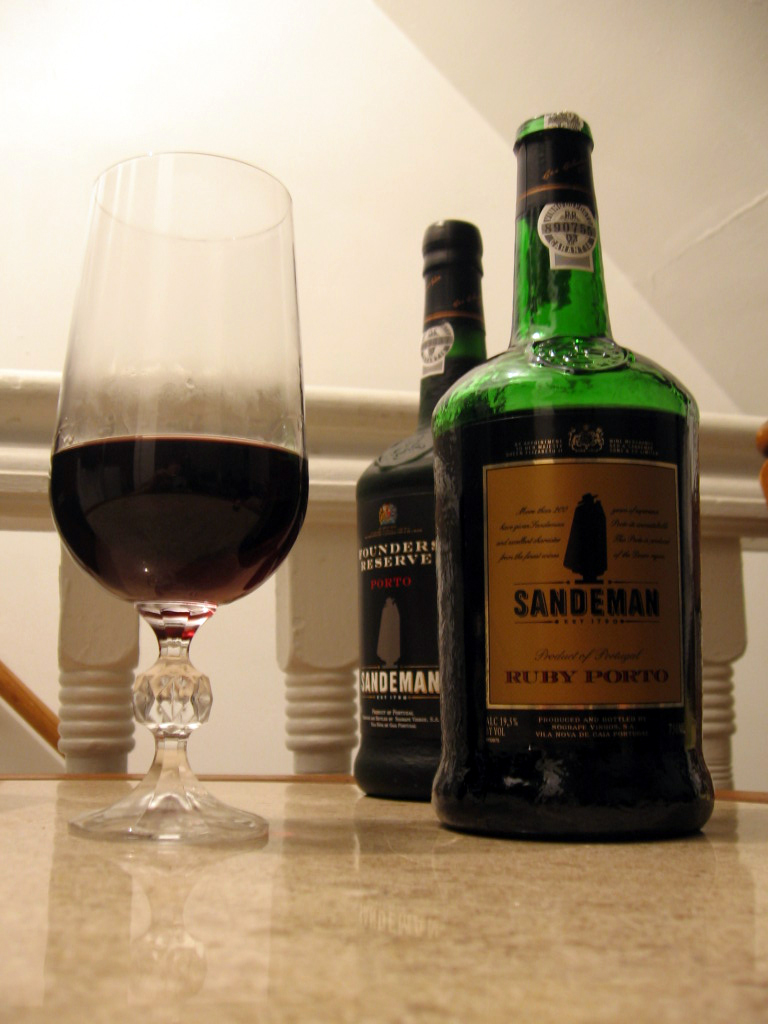
In wines like Port, the addition of neutral grape spirits stuns the yeast and halts fermentation, leaving a wine with a higher proportion of fructose sugars and creating a sweet wine.

Fructose, along with glucose, is one of the principal sugars involved in the creation of wine. At time of harvest, there is usually an equal amount of glucose and fructose molecules in the grape; however, as the grape overripens the level of fructose will become higher. In wine, fructose can taste nearly twice as sweet as glucose and is a key component in the creation of sweet dessert wines. During fermentation, glucose is consumed first by the yeast and converted into alcohol. A winemaker that chooses to halt fermentation (either by temperature control or the addition of brandy spirits in the process of fortification) will be left with a wine that is high in fructose and notable residual sugars. The technique of süssreserve, where unfermented grape must is added after the wine's fermentation is complete, will result in a wine that tastes less sweet than a wine whose fermentation was halted. This is because the unfermented grape must will still have roughly equal parts of fructose and the less sweet tasting glucose. Similarly, the process of chaptalization where sucrose (which is one part glucose and one part fructose) is added will usually not increase the sweetness level of the wine.

== In wine tasting ==
In wine tasting, humans are least sensitive to the taste of sweetness (in contrast to sensitivity to bitterness or sourness) with the majority of the population being able to detect sugar or "sweetness" in wines between 1% and 2.5% residual sugar. Additionally, other components of wine such as acidity and tannins can mask the perception of sugar in the wine.

== Flash release ==
Flash release is a technique used in wine pressing. The technique allows for a better extraction of wine polysaccharides.

== See also ==
- Gluconic acid – an acid sugar found in wine
