= Wine law =

Wine laws are legislation regulating various aspects of production and sales of wine. The purpose of wine laws includes combating wine fraud, by means of regulated protected designations of origin, labelling practices and classification of wine, as well as regulating allowed additives and procedures in winemaking and viticulture. Legislation affecting all kinds of alcohol beverages, such as the legal drinking age and licensing practices related to distribution and sales, are usually not considered wine laws.

Wine is regulated by regional, state, and local laws. The laws and their relative rigidity differ for New World and Old World wines. Old World wines tend to have more stringent regulations than New World wines. Various wine laws, however, may include appellation-based regulations that cover boundaries as well as permitted grape varieties and winemaking practice-such as the French Appellation d'origine contrôlée (AOC), Italian Denominazione di origine controllata (DOC), Spanish Denominación de Origen (DO) and Portuguese Denominação de Origem Controlada (DOC). In some New World wine regions, such as the United States and Australia, the wine laws of the appellation systems (American Viticultural Area (AVA) and Australian Geographical Indication (GIs)) only pertain to boundary specifics and guaranteeing that a certain percentage of grapes come from the area listed on the wine label.

Some wine laws are established by local governments and are specific to that wine region, such as the 1954 municipal decree in the village of Châteauneuf-du-Pape that banned the overhead flying, landing or taking off of flying saucers in the commune which could negatively affect the region's vineyards and wine production.

== History ==
The oldest known wine laws were created by the Roman emperor Domitian, who c. 92 issued an edict that banned the plantings of any new vineyards in Italy and ordered the uprooting of half of the vineyards in Roman provinces. The purpose of the edict was to improve the food supply of Roman cities by increasing the production of cereals. There is evidence to suggest that Domitian's edict was largely ignored in the Roman provinces. Domitian's edict, while probably not followed to any greater extent, stayed in effect for 188 years until Emperor Probus repealed the measure in 280.

In the Holy Roman Empire, the oldest wine law was created by the Reichstag 1498 to combat wine fraud.

In the wake of the Great French Wine Blight, which led to much wine fraud to supplement diminishing supply, wine laws were created in France to combat fraud. The French wine legislation later evolved to the AOC system, and inspired common European Union regulations.

== Comparative wine laws ==
=== European Union ===
In the European Union (EU), much of the wine law is common to all countries through the European Union wine regulations which is a part of the Common Agricultural Policy (CAP). The CAP Wine Regime consists of a set of rules that govern the wine sector, with the aim of achieving a balanced and open market. The principal features are rules governing production, oenological practices and processes, classification of wines, a range of structural and support measures, detailed rules governing the description and labeling of wines, and imports from non-EU countries.

In addition to regulations that apply to all EU members, each EU country has its own framework of laws which govern aspects of winemaking such as the percentage of a grape to be included in a wine labeled with that variety name. For instance, in France wine professionals acribe to the Appellation d’Origine Contrôlée (AOC) system, which guarantees the origin of wine and other food products, such as cheese.

=== United States ===
In the United States, the wine laws are more flexible than European standards in regards to regulations on what viticultural and winemaking practice are allowed in each wine region. The Bureau of Alcohol, Tobacco, Firearms and Explosives (BATFE) defines and approves applications for regions to become American Viticultural Areas. This system was established in 1978 with the Augusta AVA in Missouri designated as the first recognized AVA on June 20, 1980. A sizable portion of American wine laws relate to wine labelling practices and include the stipulations that if an AVA name appears on the label that at least 85% of grapes used to produce the wine must come from that AVA. In addition to AVAs, every American state and county can produce wine and label it under their state/county wide appellation provided at least 75% of the grapes come from that area. The state of California and Texas have wine laws increasing the requirement to 100% and 85%, respectively, for use of a statewide appellation on the wine label.

The appearance of grape variety (or varietal) and vintage year is also regulated by US wine labeling laws with requirements of at least 75% for the grape variety and 95% being harvested in that vintage year for either to appear on the wine label. The state of Oregon has increased the restriction for grape variety to 90%, with exception of Cabernet Sauvignon which under Oregon wine laws can have a minimum 75%. Additionally, all US wine must include the Surgeon General warning about dangers associated with alcohol consumption and a warning about the possible use of sulfites. Several wineries and importers have had conflicts with the BATFE over these labeling requirements, one notable example being the importer Kermit Lynch. The criticism is typically centered on the absence of inclusion about the potential positive aspects of moderate wine consumption (such as the so-called "French paradox") and that many wineries are forced to label their wines as "containing sulfites" when the decision to use sulfites are normally not made until long after wine labels have been ordered and the finished wine may contain no added sulfites.

== See also ==
- Alcohol law
