= Must weight =

Measure of sugar in grape juice

Must weight is a measure of the amount of sugar in grape juice (must) and, hence, indicates the amount of alcohol that could be produced if it is all fermented to alcohol, rather than left as residual sugar.

== Measurement units ==
In France and many other countries, the grape must density is often recalculated to show potential alcohol, the percent alcohol content that would be the result if the must were fermented to a completely dry wine.

=== Refractometer scales ===
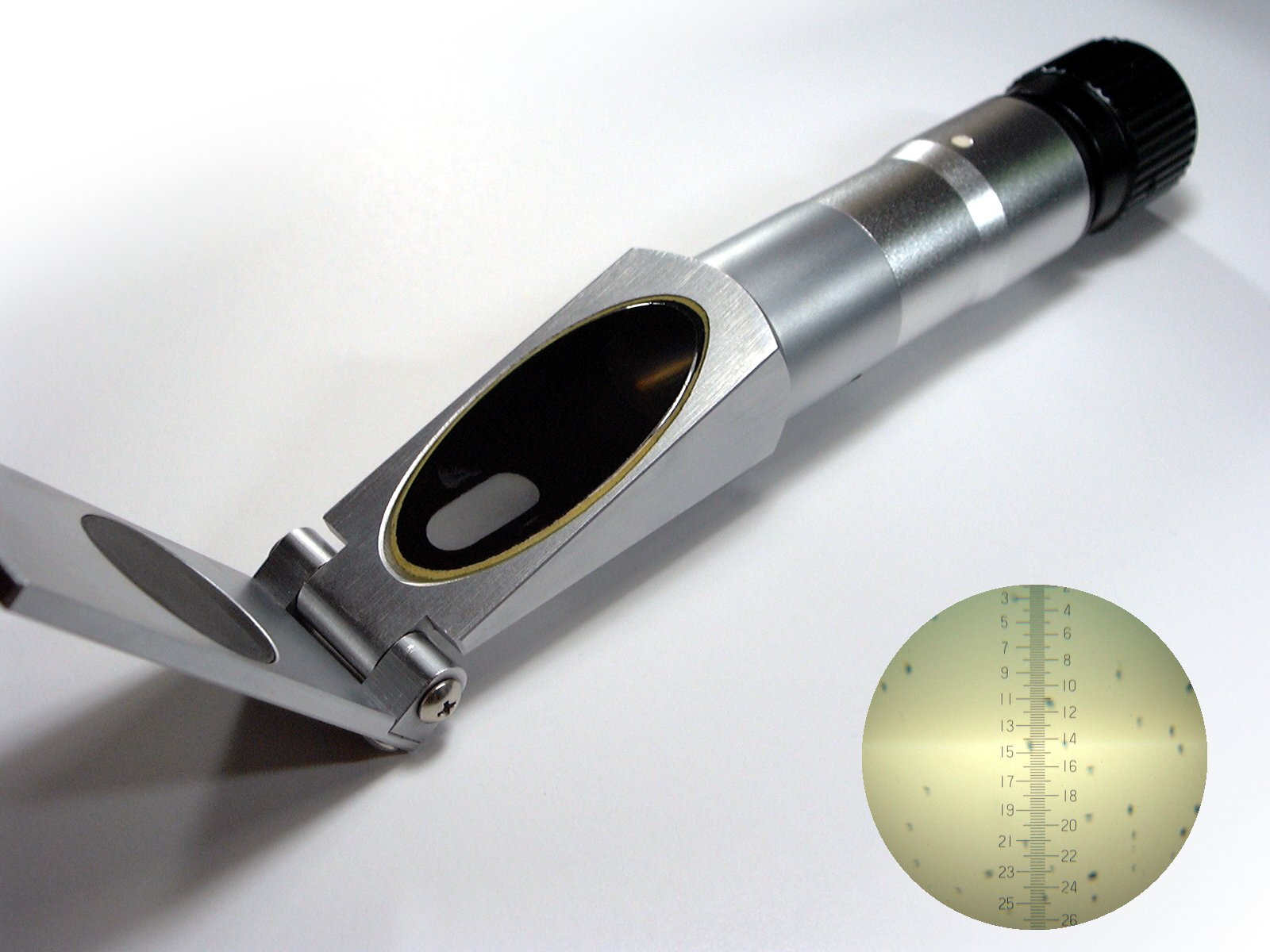
A classical hand-held Brix refractometer.

- Brix (°Bx): Used in Italy, France, and Canada.
- Klosterneuburger Mostwaage (KMW): Used in Austria. The scale is divided into Klosterneuburger Zuckergrade (°KMW). However, the KMW measures the exact sugar content of the must.
- Normalizovaný moštoměr (°NM): Used in the Czech Republic, and Slovakia.

=== Hydrometer scales ===
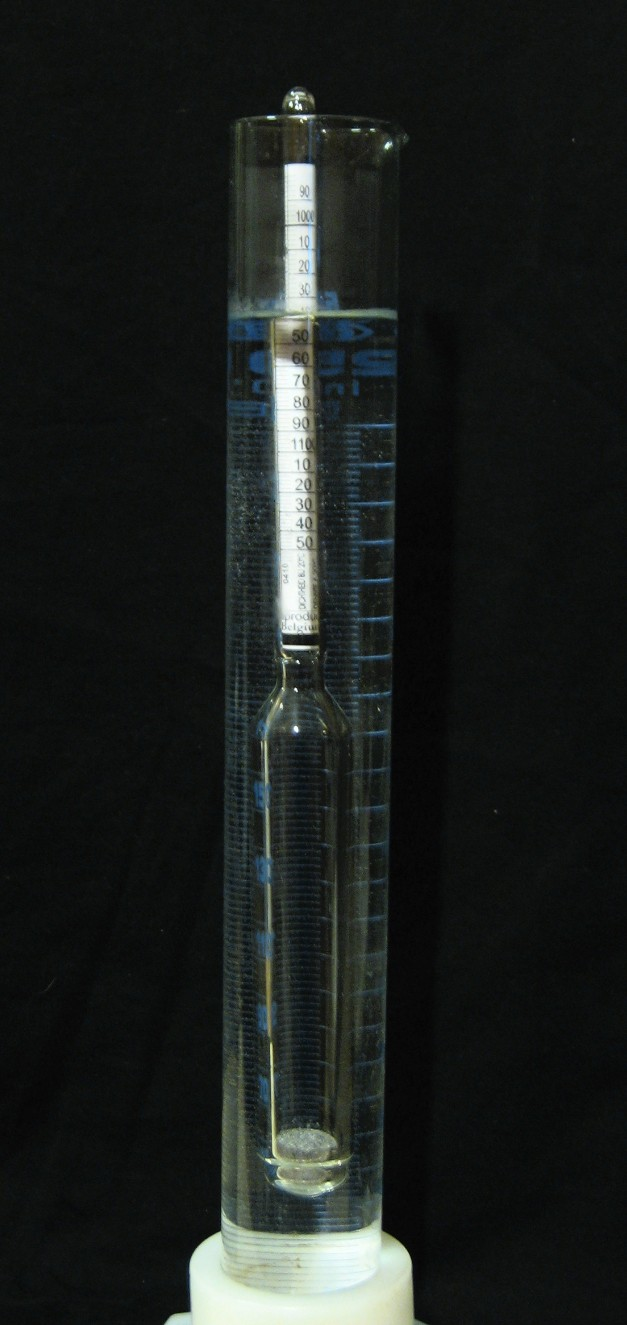
A relative density saccharometer in a sugar solution, 1040 g/L.

- Baumé scale (Bé°): Occasionally used in France and by U.S. brewers.
- Oechsle scale (°Oe): Used in Germany, Luxemburg and Switzerland. It is an important part of the German wine classification.
- Relative density: Used in the United States (although Brix is sometimes used).

== Measuring must weight ==
Must weights are commonly measured in the vineyard to monitor the ripeness of the grapes, which helps select the time of harvest. For this purpose, it is usually measured by using a refractometer. A few grapes are crushed between the fingers and the must is dripped onto the glass of the refractometer. The refractometer will be calibrated in a must weight scale, but as refractometers actually measure refractive index (of the grape must in this case), the must weight scale on the refractometer is in effect an indirect measurement, with refractive indices having been pre-converted to their must weight equivalents.

== See also ==
- Concentration
- Sugars in wine
- Winemaking
