= German wine classification =

Overview of the wine classification system in Germany

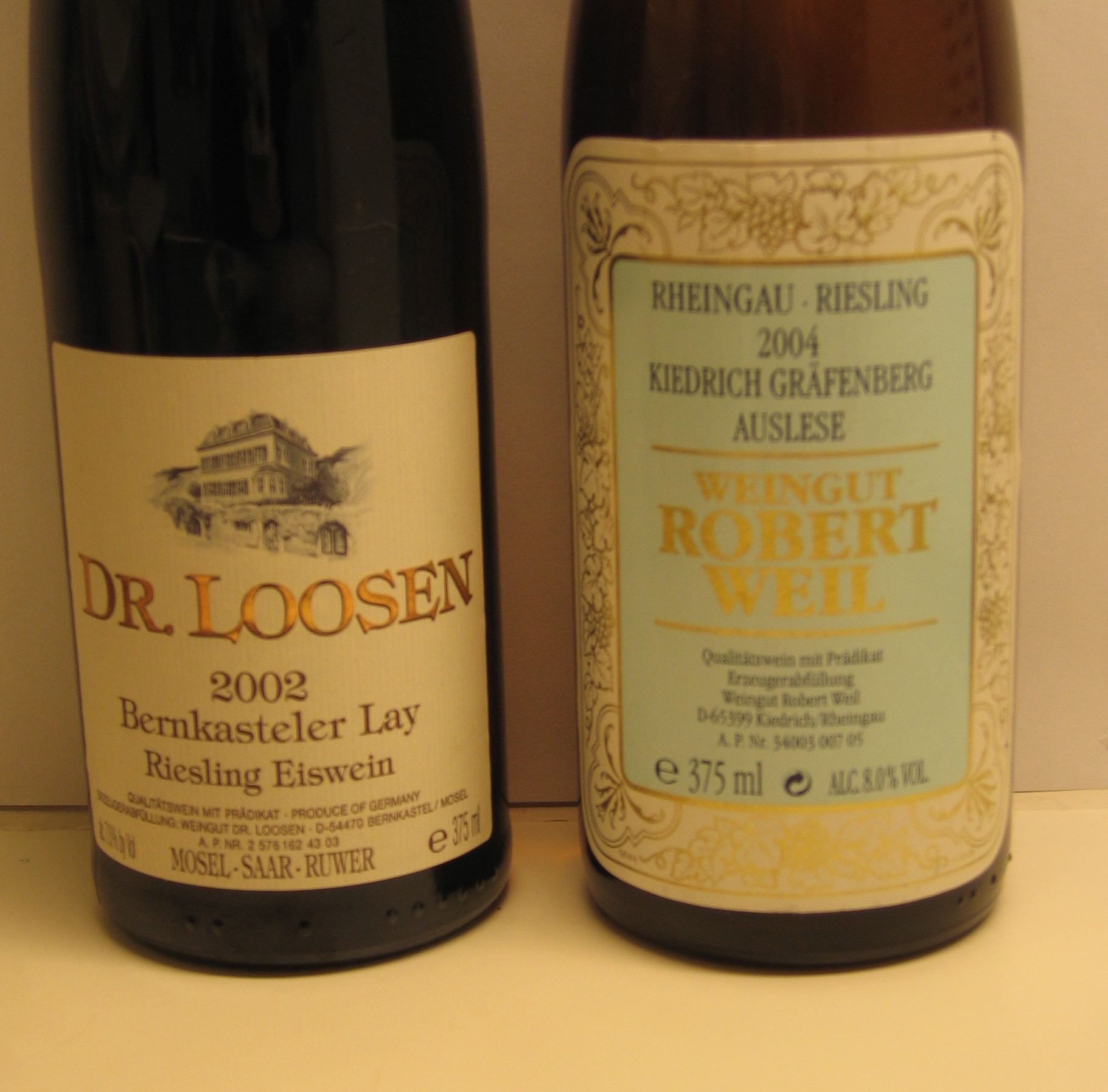
The bottle on the left displays: Producer (Dr. Loosen) – vintage – village (Bernkastel) and vineyard (Lay) – variety (Riesling) and Prädikat (Eiswein) – mandatory information in small print – alcoholic strength, region (Mosel-Saar-Ruwer) and volume. The bottle on the right uses a slightly different order: Region (Rheingau) and variety (Riesling) – vintage – village (Kiedrich) and vineyard (Gräfenberg) – Prädikat (Auslese) – producer (Weingut Robert Weil) – volume and alcoholic strength.

The German wine classification system puts a strong emphasis on standardization and factual completeness, and was first implemented by the German Wine Law of 1971. Nearly all of Germany's vineyards are delineated and registered as one of approximately 2,600 Einzellagen ('individual sites'), and the produce from any vineyard can be used to make German wine at any quality level, as long as the must weight of the grapes reaches the designated minimum level. As the current German system does not classify vineyards by quality, the measure of wine ’quality’ is the ripeness of the grapes alone.

Approximately 200 wine makers have been organised since 1910 in the Verband Deutscher Prädikatsweingüter (VDP). To counter the shortcomings of the 1971 law, the VDP nowadays classifies the best vineyards by its own rules into 'VDP.Grosse Lage' (Grand cru) and 'VDP.Erste Lage' (Premier cru) based on 19th century Prussian tax maps. Most of these wine makers are based in the regions of Mosel, Pfalz, and Franken.

The classification of wines has been reorganized since 1 August 2009 by the EU wine market organization. The traditional German wine classification remained mostly unchanged, as the European system follows the origin-related system like in Germany and most areas of France (AOC). The already existing protection of geographical indication was transmitted through this step as well to the wine classification.

== Quality designations ==
There are two major categories of German wine: table and "quality" wine. Table wine includes the designations Deutscher Wein (previously Tafelwein) and Landwein. Unlike the supposed equivalents of "Vin de Table" / "Vino da Tavola" and "Indicazione Geografica Tipica" / "Vin de Pays", production levels are not high, and these wines are typically exported to the United States. In 2005, Tafelwein and Landwein only accounted for 3.6% of total production. In Baden, there is a growing trend to release high-end wines as Landwein.

Quality wine is divided into two types:

Qualitätswein, or quality wine from a specific region.
This is wine from one of the 13 wine-growing regions (Anbaugebiete), and the region must be shown on the label. It is a basic level of everyday, mostly inexpensive quaffing wines. The grapes are at a fairly low level of ripeness, with must weights of 51°Oe to 72°Oe. The alcohol content of the wine must be at least 7% by volume, and chaptalization (adding sugar to the unfermented grape juice to boost the final alcohol level, which in no way alters the sweetness) is often used. Qualitätswein range from dry to semi-sweet, and the style is often indicated on the label, along with the designation Qualitätswein and the region. Some top-level dry wines are officially Qualitätswein although they would qualify as Prädikatswein. All dry wines produced by members of the VDP association are always declared as Qualitätswein.

Prädikatswein, or superior quality wine.
Known as Qualitätswein mit Prädikat (QmP) (quality wine with specific attributes) until August 2007, this is the top level of German wines. These prominently display a Prädikat (ripeness level designation) on the label and may not be chaptalized. Prädikatswein range from dry to intensely sweet, but unless it is specifically indicated that the wine is dry or off-dry, these wines always contain a noticeable amount of residual sugar. Prädikatswein must be produced from allowed varieties in one of the 39 subregions (Bereich) of one of the 13 wine-growing regions, although it is the region rather than the subregion which is mandatory information on the label. (Some of the smaller regions, such as Rheingau, consist of only one subregion.)

The different Prädikat (superior quality wine) designations used are as follows, in order of increasing sugar levels in the must:

Kabinett – literally "cabinet"
fully ripened light wines from the main harvest, typically semi-sweet with crisp acidity, but can be dry if designated so. This term may have originated as indicating the winemaker felt it was good enough to put in his own cabinet rather than offer it for sale.
Spätlese – meaning "late harvest"
typically half-dry, often (but not always) sweeter and fruitier than Kabinett. The grapes are picked at least 7 days after normal harvest, so they are riper. While waiting to pick the grapes carries a risk of the crop being ruined by rain, in warm years and from good sites much of the harvest can reach Spätlese level. Spätlese can be a relatively full-bodied dry wine if designated so. While Spätlese means late harvest the wine is not as sweet as a dessert wine, as the "late harvest" term is often used in US wines.
Auslese – meaning "select harvest"
made from very ripe, hand selected bunches, typically semi-sweet or sweet, sometimes with some noble rot character. Sometimes Auslese is also made into a powerful dry wine, but the designation Auslese trocken has been discouraged after the introduction of Grosses Gewächs. Auslese is the Prädikat which covers the widest range of wine styles, and can be a dessert wine.
Beerenauslese – meaning "select berry harvest"
made from overripe grapes individually selected from bunches and often affected by noble rot, making rich sweet dessert wine.
Trockenbeerenauslese – meaning "select dry berry harvest" or "dry berry selection"
made from selected overripe shrivelled grapes often affected by noble rot making extremely rich sweet wines. "Trocken" in this phrase refers to the grapes being dried on the vine rather than the resulting wine being a dry style.
Eiswein (ice wine)
made from grapes that have been naturally frozen on the vine, making a very concentrated wine. Must reach at least the same level of sugar content in the must as a Beerenauslese. The most classic Eiswein style is to use only grapes that are not affected by noble rot. Until the 1980s, the Eiswein designation was used in conjunction with another Prädikat (which indicated the ripeness level of the grapes before they had frozen), but is now considered a Prädikat of its own.

The minimum must weight requirements for the different Prädikat designations are as follows. Many producers, especially top-level producers, exceed the minimum requirements by a wide margin.

Prädikat	Minimum must weight	Examples of requirements		Minimum alcohol level in the wine
	Dependent on grape variety and wine-growing region	Riesling from Mosel	Riesling from Rheingau	
Kabinett	67–82°Oe	70°Oe	73°Oe	7%
Spätlese	76–90°Oe	76°Oe	85°Oe	7%
Auslese	83–100°Oe	83°Oe	95°Oe	7%
Beerenauslese, Eiswein	110–128°Oe	110°Oe	125°Oe	5.5%
Trockenbeerenauslese	150–154°Oe	150°Oe	150°Oe	5.5%

This does not necessarily determine the sweetness of the final wine, because the winemaker may choose to ferment the wine fully or let some residual sugar remain.

== Special designations ==
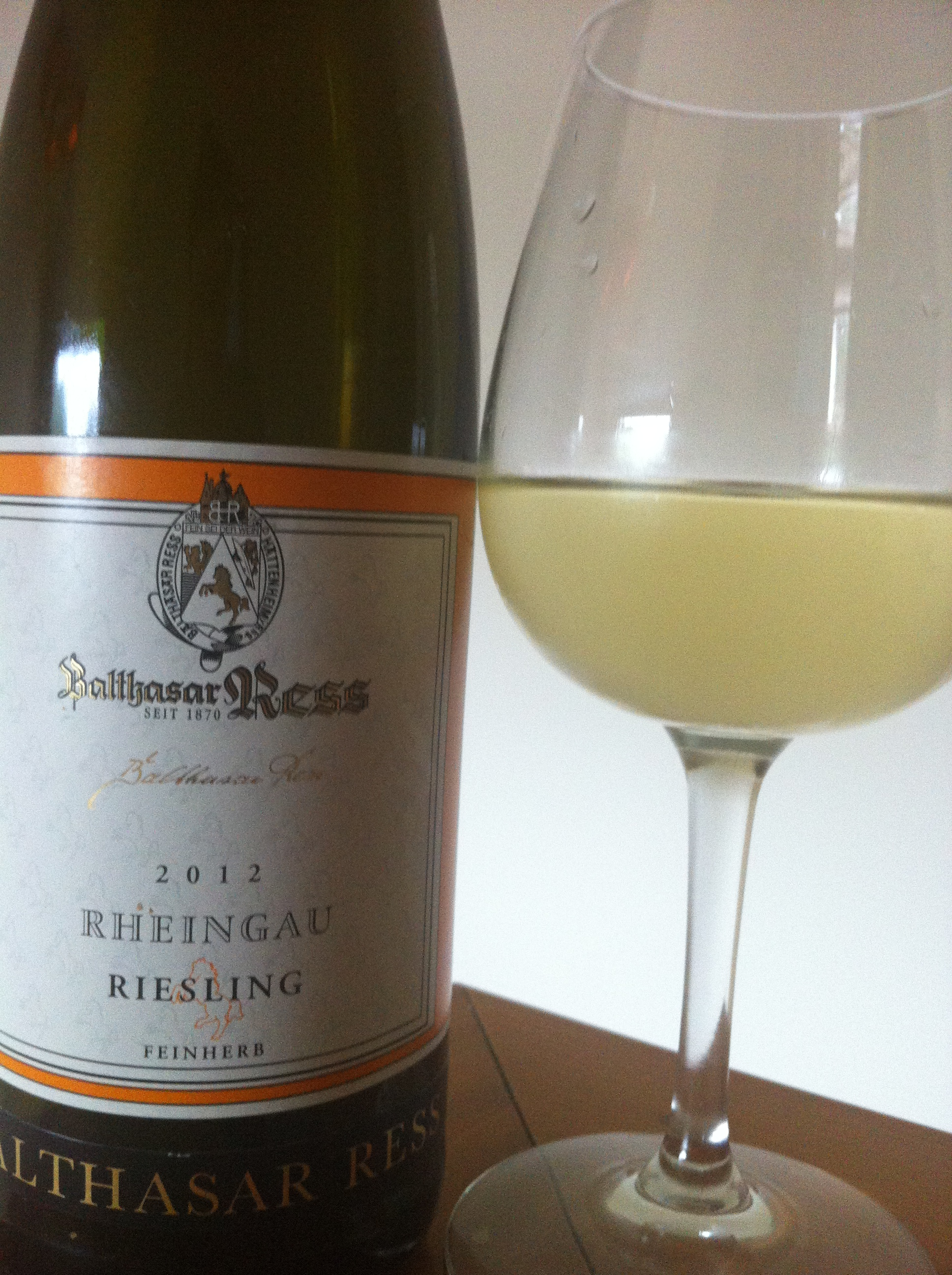
A Riesling from the Rheingau using the "Feinherb" (off dry) designation

In certain regions, additional rules are applied to how a wine is classified. These special names represent special characters.

=== Sweetness of the wine ===
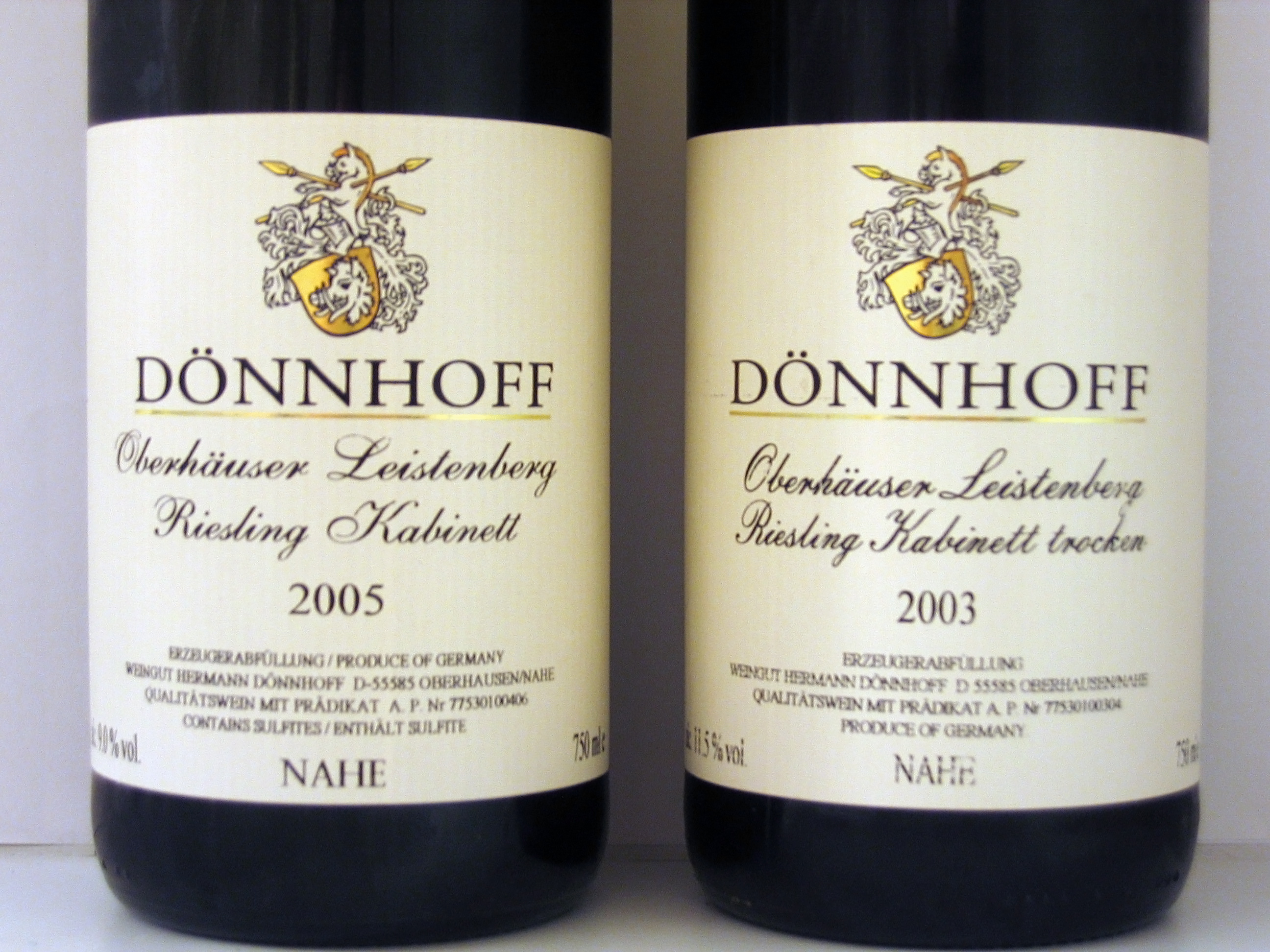
A bottle of Kabinett and a bottle of Kabinett trocken from the same producer and vineyard, showing how the sugar content of the finished wine may be indicated on a German wine label

The sugar content in the finished wine can be indicated by the following designations for Qualitätswein and Prädikatswein. For sparkling wines (Sekt), many of the same designations are used, but have a different meaning.

Designation	English translation	Maximum sugar level allowed		
		Low acid wines	Medium acid wines	High acid wines
trocken	dry	4 grams per liter	acid level in grams per liter + 2	9 grams per liter
halbtrocken	half-dry	12 grams per liter	acid level in grams per liter + 10	18 grams per liter
feinherb	off-dry	Unregulated designation, slightly sweeter than halbtrocken		
lieblich, mild or restsüß	semi-sweet	Usually not specially marked as such on the label. Follows by default from their Prädikat in the absence of the above designations.		
süß or edelsüß	sweet	Usually not specially marked as such on the label. Follows by default from their Prädikat in the absence of the above designations.		

=== Colour ===
There are also colour designations that can be used on the label:

Weißwein – white wine
May be produced only from white varieties. This designation is seldom used.
Rotwein – red wine
May be produced only from red varieties with sufficient maceration to make the wine red. Sometimes used for clarification if the producer also makes rosés from the same grape variety.
Roséwein – rosé wine
Produced from red varieties with a shorter maceration, the wine must have pale red or clear red colour.
Weißherbst – rosé wine or blanc de noirs
A rosé wine which must conform to special rules: must be Qualitätswein or Prädikatswein, single variety and be labelled with the varietal name. There are no restrictions as to the colour of the wine, so they range from pale gold to deep pink. Weißherbst wines also range from dry to sweet, such as rosé Eiswein from Spätburgunder.

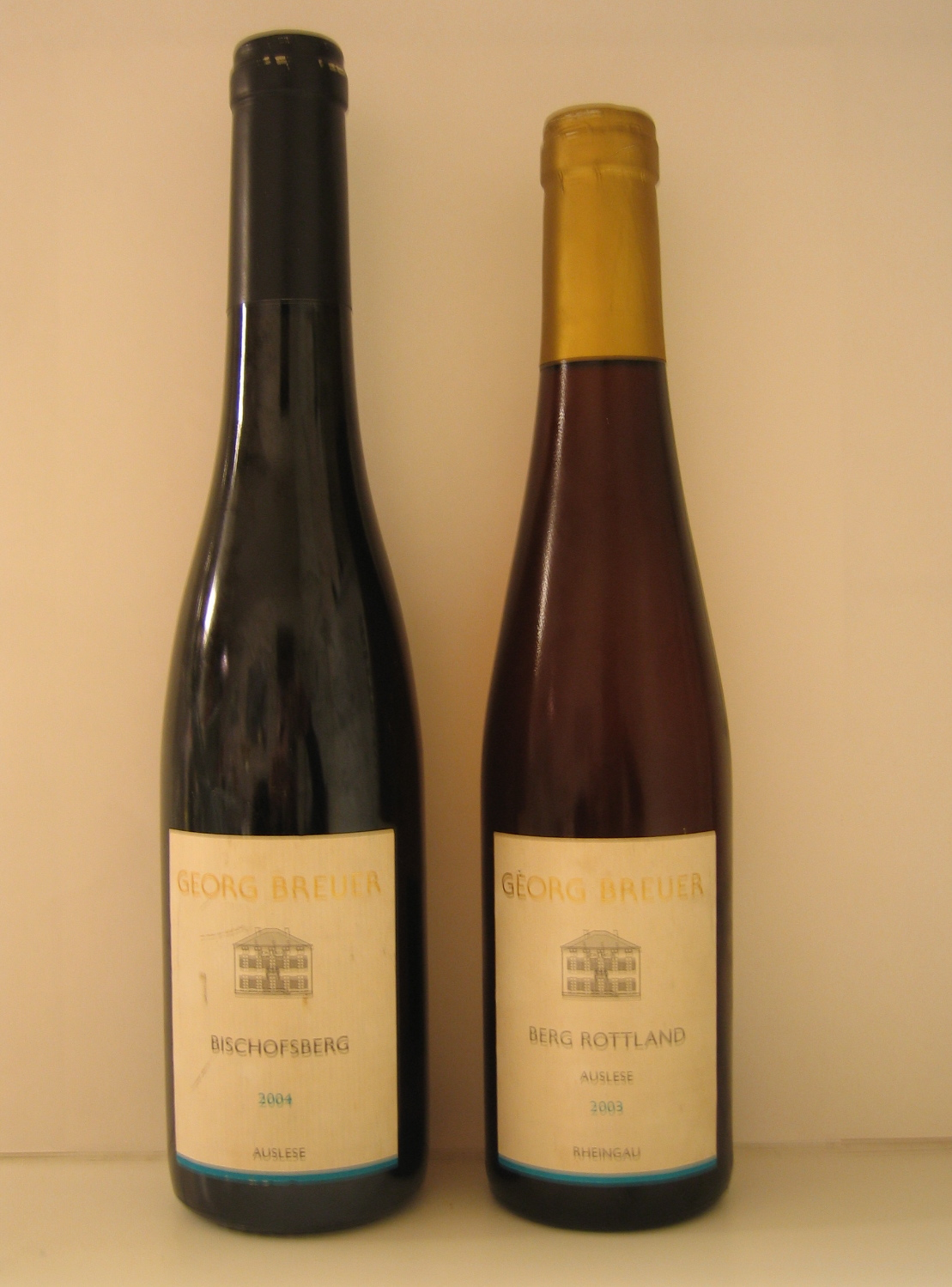
A bottle of regular Riesling Auslese (left) and a bottle of Riesling Auslese Goldkapsel (Gold capsule) from the same producer

=== Extra ripeness or higher quality ===
Some producers also use additional propriate designations to denote quality or ripeness level within a Prädikat. These are outside the scope of the German wine law. Especially for Auslese, which can cover a wide range of sweetness levels, the presence of any of these designations tends to indicate a sweet dessert wine rather than a semi-sweet wine. These designations are all unregulated.

Goldkapsel – gold capsule
A golden capsule or foil on the bottle. Denotes a wine considered better by the producer. Usually means a Prädikatswein that is sweeter or more intense, or indicates an auction wine made in a very small lot.
Stars *, ** or ***
Usually means that a Prädikatswein has been harvested at a higher level of ripeness than the minimum required, and can mean that the wine is sweeter or more intense.
Fuder (vat) numbers
Usually indicated for better wines and often the numbers are arranged in some logical order, although the same numbers need not return in each vintage. This practice seems to be most common for semi-sweet and sweet wines in the Mosel region.

=== Special and regional wine types ===
There are also a number of specialty and regional wines, considered as special version of some quality category. Here are some of them:

Liebfraumilch or Liebfrauenmilch
A semi-sweet Qualitätswein from the Rheingau, Nahe, Rheinhessen or Pfalz, consisting at least 70% of the varieties Riesling, Müller-Thurgau, Silvaner or Kerner. In practice there is very little Riesling in Liebfraumilch since varietally labelled Riesling wines tend to fetch a higher price. Liebfraumilch may not carry a varietal designation on the label. Liebfraumilch is one of Germany's most well known wines, and is in principle a medium-quality wine designation although more commonly perceived to be a low-quality wine both at home and on the export market.
Moseltaler
An off-dry/semi-sweet Qualitätswein cuvée from the Mosel wine region (Moseltal is Moselle Valley in German) made from the following white grape varieties: Riesling, Müller-Thurgau, Elbling and Kerner. May not carry a varietal designation on the label, and sold under a uniform logotype. Must have a residual sugar of 15–30 grams per liter and a minimum acidity of 7 grams per liter. Basically a Liebfraumilch-lookalike from Mosel.
Rotling
A wine produced from a mixture of red and white varieties. A Rotling must have pale red or clear red color
Schillerwein
A Rotling from the Württemberg wine-growing region, which must be Qualitätswein or Prädikatswein.
Badisch Rotgold
A Rotling from the Baden wine-growing region, which must be Qualitätswein or Prädikatswein. It must be made from Grauburgunder and Spätburgunder and the varieties must be specified on the label.

=== New classes for wines ===
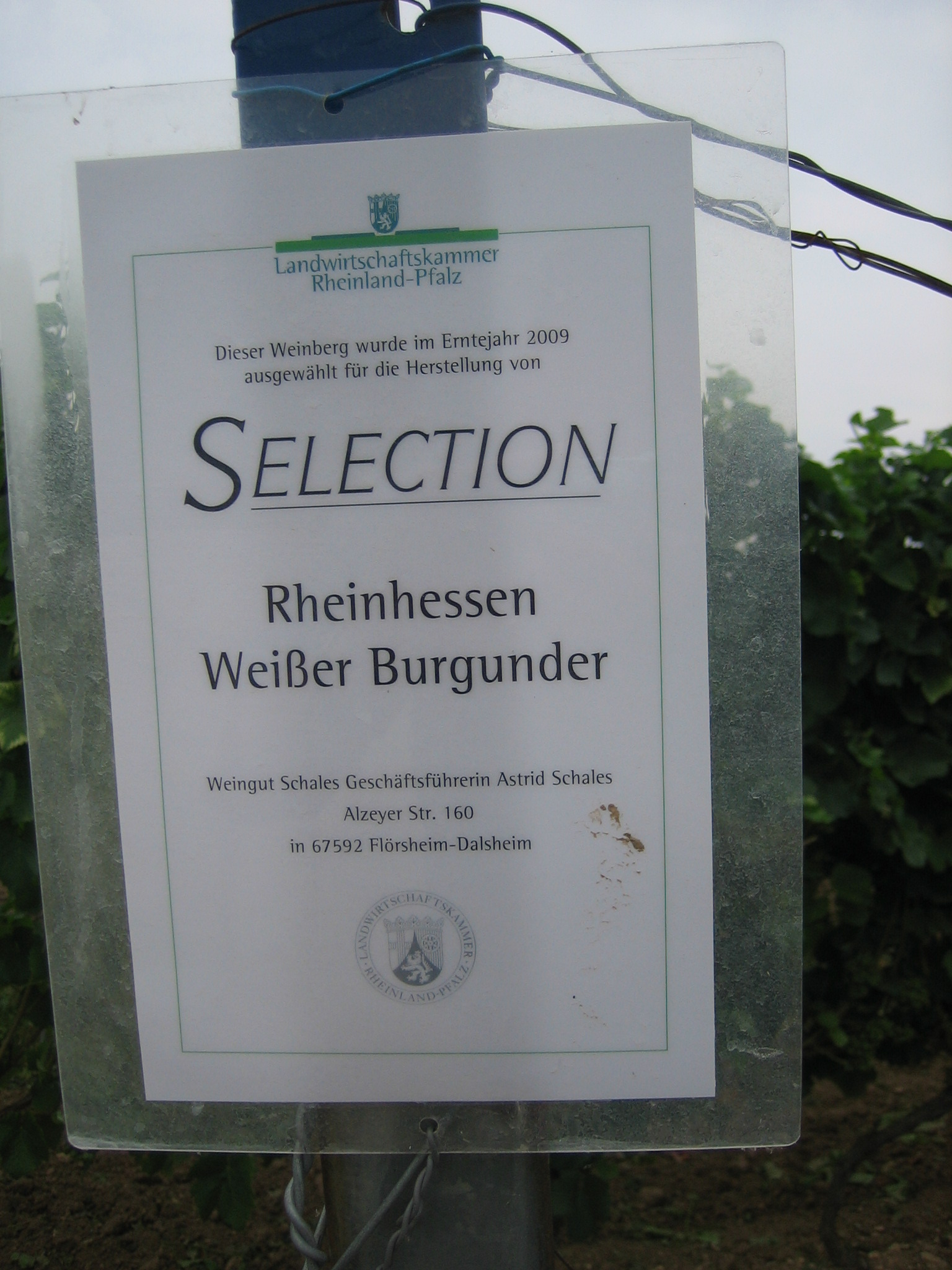
Indication: Selection in a vineyard in Rheinhessen

There are two classes for wines with official status in all 13 Anbaugebiete and one regional class in Rheinhessen and the Rheingau, respectively.

Classic
Introduced with the 2000 vintage, Classic is in principle a dry or slightly off-dry Qualitätswein that conforms to slightly higher standards intended to make it food-friendly. It must be made from varieties considered classical in its region, have a potential alcohol of 1% (or 8°Oe) above the minimum requirements for its variety and region, and have an alcohol level of minimum 12.0% by volume, except in Mosel, where the minimum level is 11.5%. Maximum sugar level is twice the acid level, but no more than 15 grams per liter.
Riesling Hochgewächs
Literally meaning ”high growth”. A riesling with a natural alcohol level at least 1.5 percentage points above the minimum Qualitätswein requirement for the Anbaugebiet. Additionally, the wine has to score an average of at least 3 points in the official wine examination (Amtliche Weinprüfung).

Selection Rheinhessen
A wine made from hand-picked, fully ripe grapes (min. 90° Oechsle) originating in a single vineyard in Rheinhessen. The grapes have to be typical to the region (Silvaner, Riesling, Weißburgunder, Grauburgunder, Gewürztraminer, Portugieser, Frühburgunder or Spätburgunder) and the wine must pass a sensory test.

Rheingau Großes Gewächs
Literally meaning ”Rheingau great growth”. Limited to the Rheingau region through the state wine decree of Hessia, a legally dry riesling (min. 12% alc.) or spätburgunder (min. 13% alc.) from classified vineyard sites. The wine must pass a tasting test by the review board. Replaces the Erstes Gewächs designation starting from the 2018 vintage and is stylized as RGG on the wine label.

Charta Riesling
a 100% Rheingau Riesling of Qualitätswein or Prädikatswein quality with a residual sugar ranging from 9–18 grams/liter (off-dry) and a minimum acidity of 7.5 grams/liter. The wines must achieve higher starting must weights than required by law and undergo sensory testing by a special panel (in addition to the A.P.Nr. procedure). Uniform packaging.

== Geographic classification ==
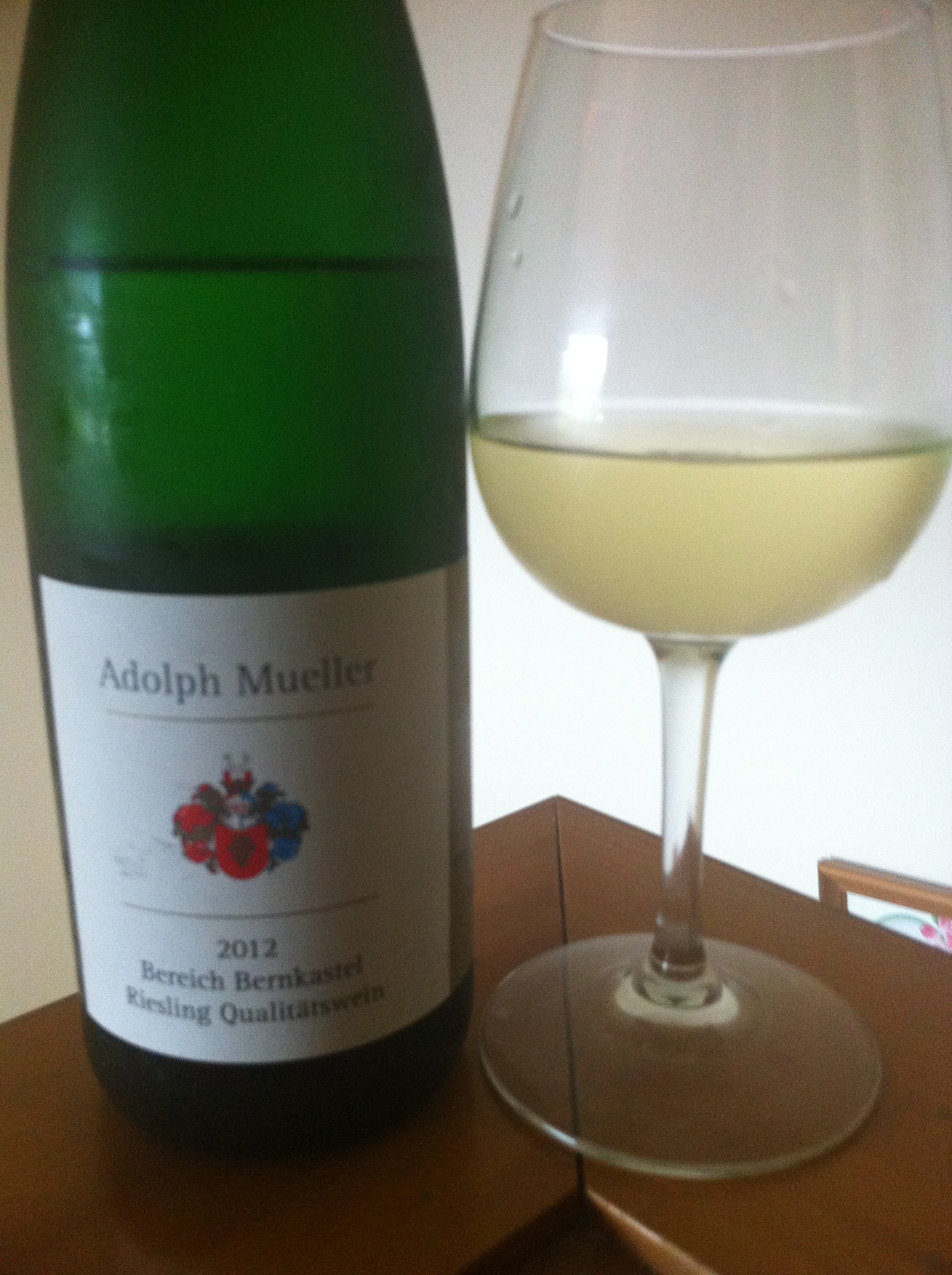
A Riesling from the Bernkastel region, on the Moselle River

The geographic classification is different for Landwein, Deutscher Wein, Qualitätswein and Prädikatswein.

=== Geographic classification for Deutscher Wein (formerly Tafelwein) and Landwein ===
There are seven Deutscher Wein regions: Rhein-Mosel, Bayern, Neckar, Oberrhein, Albrechtsburg, Stargarder Land and Niederlausitz. These are divided into a number of subregions, which in turn are divided into 19 Landwein regions (and must be trocken or halbtrocken in style). (There is no Landwein region for Franken.) Names of individual vineyards are not used for Deutscher Wein or Landwein. Deutscher Wein must be 100% German in origin, or specifically state on the label where grapes were sourced from within the European Union. Sparkling wine produced at the Deutscher Wein level is often labeled as Deutscher Sekt and is made from 100% German grapes/wine.

=== Geographic classification for Qualitätswein and Prädikatswein ===
There are four levels of geographic classification, and any level of classification can be used on the label of Qualitätswein and Prädikatswein:

- Anbaugebiet, wine growing regions, of which there are 13. Anbaugebiet is always indicated on the label of Qualitätswein and Prädikatswein.
- Bereich, district, of which there are 39. Each Anbaugebiet is divided into one or more Bereiche.
- Großlage, collective site, which is a collective name for a number of single vineyards, and which number about 170.
- Einzellage, single vineyard, of which there are about 2,600.

The names of Großlagen and Einzellagen are always used together with the name of a wine village, because some Einzellage names, such as Schlossberg (castle hill) are used in several villages. Unfortunately, it is not possible to tell a Großlage from an Einzellage just by looking at the wine label. A few examples of how the names appear on labels:

- The vineyard Sonnenuhr (meaning "sun dial") in the village Wehlen along the Mosel is designated as Wehlener Sonnenuhr.
- The neighbouring village Zeltingen also has a vineyard called Sonnenuhr, and will appear on the label as Zeltinger Sonnenuhr.
- Both these vineyards belong to Großlage Münzlay, which is assigned to the village Wehlen. A wine from any of these vineyards, or a blend from both of them, can be sold under the name Wehlener Münzlay.
- These vineyards lie within Bereich Bernkastel, which provides an additional choice for labelling.
- It is also possible to simply label the wine as a wine from Anbaugebiet Mosel.

There are a few exceptions to the rule that a village must be indicated together with the vineyard name, those are a handful of historical vineyards known as Ortsteil im sinne des Weingesetzes (village name in sense of the wine law). Examples are Schloss Johannisberg in Rheingau and Scharzhofberg along the Saar. They are of the same size as a typical Einzellage and could be thought of as Einzellagen which were so famous that they were excused from displaying the village name.

== Labels ==
Sample German Wine Label for a Kloster Eberbach Spätlese with front and back label. The top label is the "decorative" label which most consumers think of as the front label, but it is the smaller bottom label which contain the information required by the wine law.

Unlike French wine labels, where key information about the grape variety is not included in the labeling and thus must be known by the consumer to make an informed choice, German wine labels must display much more important information about the wine. It must always include:

1. Geographic information with either the country, the city or the exact site of the wine (depending on the quality).
2. The variety of grape(s) used and whether the wine is mix of grapes (see: cuvée).
3. The EU law quality level of the wine.
4. The year of grape harvest.
5. Whether it is dry, semi-dry or sweet.
6. The wine maker.
7. If the wine is sparkling (sekt)
8. Any other special information about the quality level.

Due to the amount of information the label some non-professionals and many consumers find German wine labels to be harder to understand than French or US labels. Jon Bonné describes German wine labels as a "thicket of exotic words and abbreviations" that require "the vinous equivalent of Cliff notes to parse."

=== Required Information ===
German wine law regulates that at least six items of information be present on the label.

- Name of the producer or bottler (e.g.: Staatsweingüter Kloster Eberbach)

German wine domaines/"châteaux" are often called "Kloster", "Schloss", "Burg", "Domaine" or "Weingut" followed by some other name.

- A.P.Nr Amtliche Prüfnummer Quality control number (e.g.: 33050 031 04)

The first number (1–9) relates to the German wine region where the wine was produced and tested (e.g. 3-Rheingau). The second 2 or 3 digit number indicates the village of the vineyard (e.g. 30-Rauenthal)). The next two digits represents the particular wine estate (e.g. 50-Kloster Eberbach). The following 2 to 3 digit number is the sequential order that the wine was submitted by that producer for testing (e.g. 031 – this was the 31st wine submitted by Kloster Eberbach for testing). The final two digits is the year of the testing, which is normally the year following the vintage (e.g. 04 – the wine was tested in 2004).

- Anbaugebiet, i.e. region of origin (e.g.: Rheingau)
- Volume of the wine (e.g.: 750ml)
- Location of the producer/bottler (e.g.: Eltville)
- Alcohol level (e.g.: 9.0% vol)

=== Additional information ===
German wine labels may also include

- Grape variety (e.g., Riesling)
- Prädikat level of ripeness (e.g., Spätlese)
- Vintage year (e.g., 2003)
- Taste, such as dry (trocken) or off-dry (halbtrocken)
- Vineyard name (e.g.: Rauenthaler Baiken, a single vineyard). The village name (e.g.: Rauenthal") is normally identified by the possessive form "-er" suffix and is sometimes followed by the vineyard name ("Baiken").
- If the wine is estate-bottled (Erzeugerabfüllung or Gutsabfüllung), bottled by a co-op (Winzergenossenschaft), or by a third party bottler (Abfüller).
- Address of the winery
- The logo of the Association of German Prädikat Wine Estates (Verband Deutscher Prädikatsweingüter, or more commonly VDP) which is awarded to the top 200 producers, as voted among themselves. The logo is a black eagle with a cluster of grapes in the center. The winery in the image example has the VDP logo. While not a guarantee, the presence of the VDP logo is a helpful insight into the quality of the wine.

== Criticism ==
In recent years, the official classification has been criticised by many of the top producers, and additional classifications have been set down by wine growers' organisations such as VDP, without enjoying legal protection. The two main reasons for criticism are that the official classification does not differentiate between better and lesser vineyards and that the quality levels are less appropriate to high-quality dry wines.
