= Districtus Austriae Controllatus =

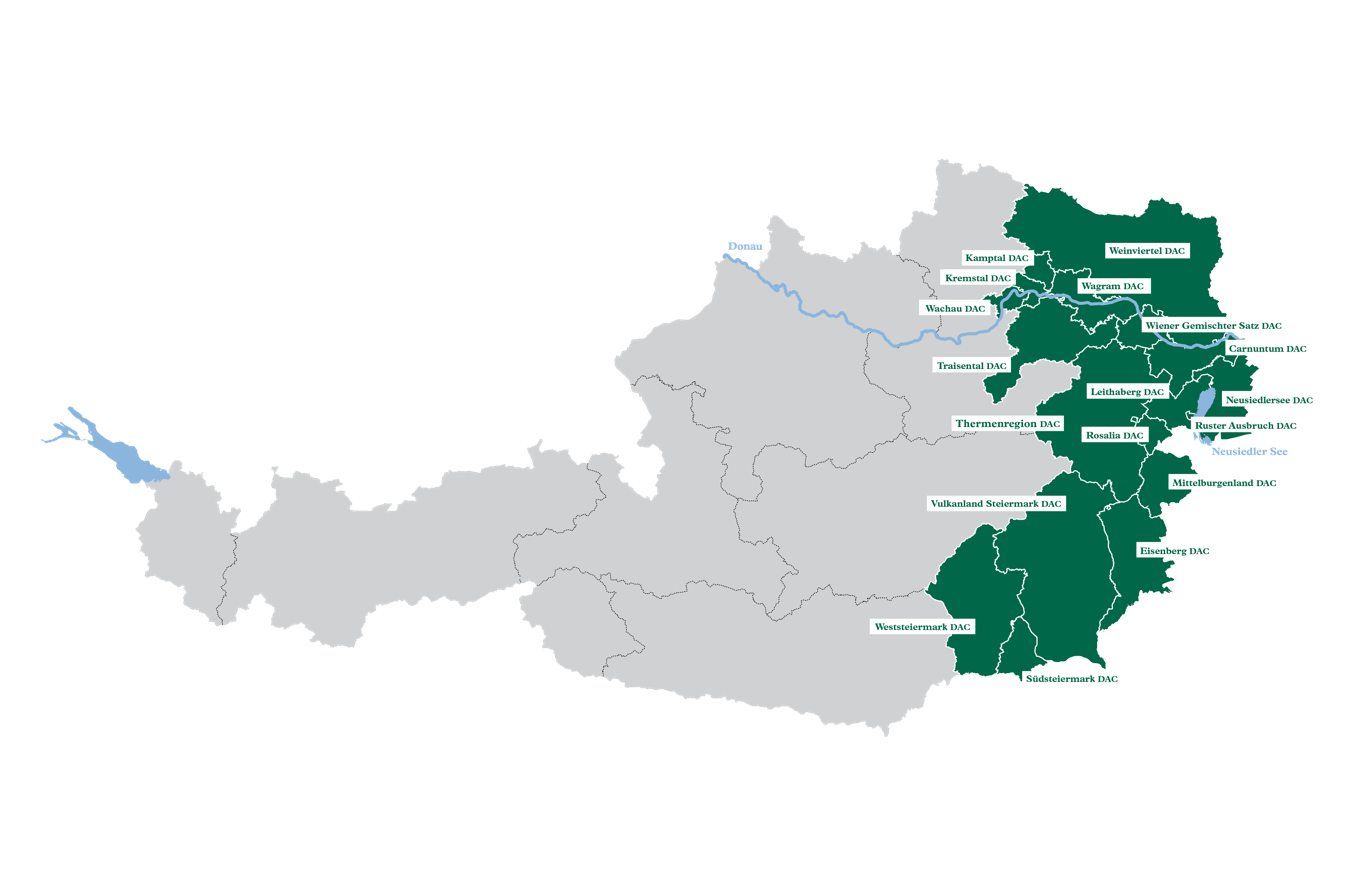
DAC winegrowing regions, as of May 2023

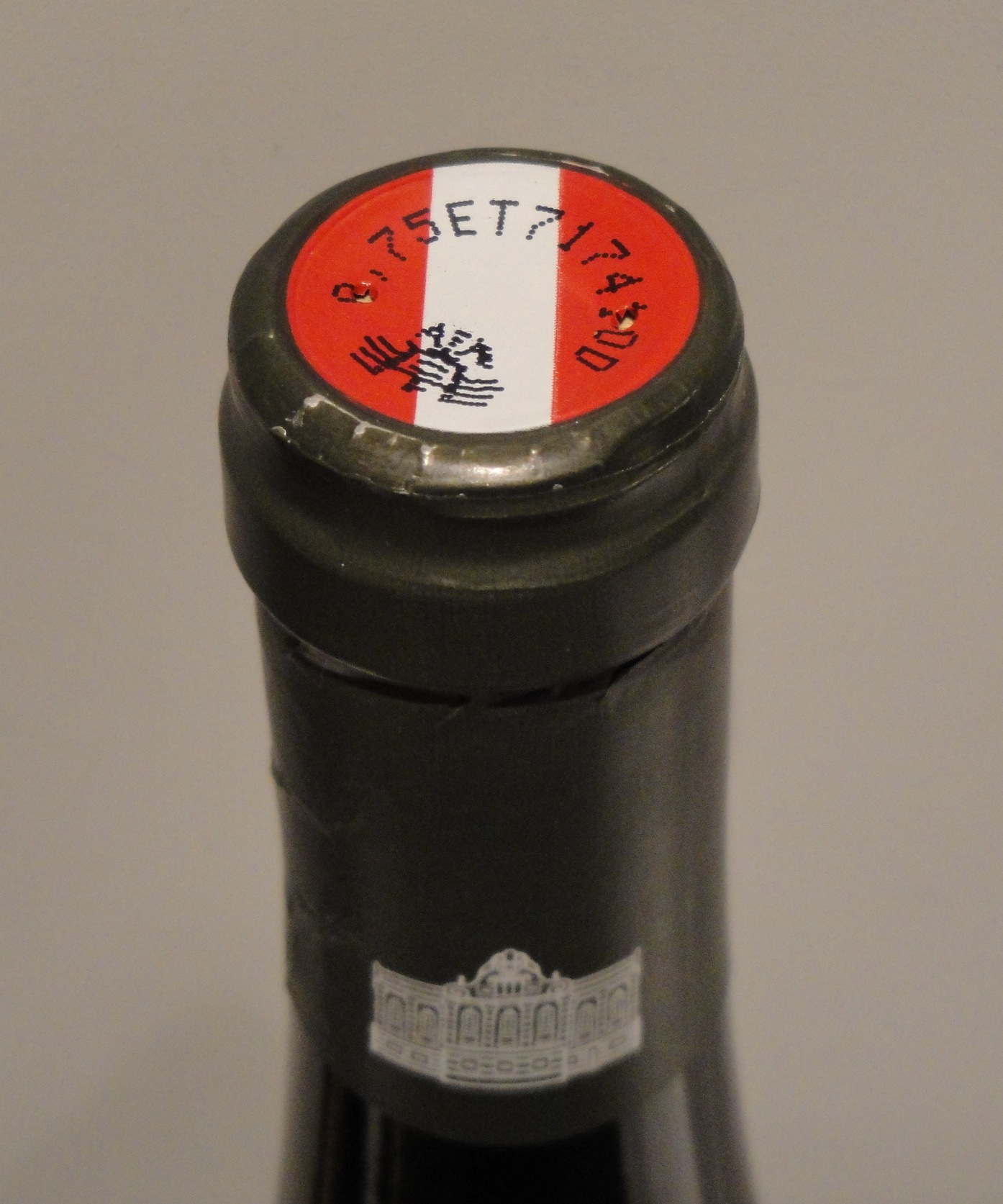
Austrian quality wine with red-white-red "banderole" showing the producer number

Districtus Austriae Controllatus (Latin, 'Controlled District of Austria'), DAC, is a classification for regionally typical quality wine (legal category "Qualitätswein") in Austria. It is loosely modelled on the French Appellation d'Origine Contrôlée (AOC) system, and is coupled with a ripeness-based classification scale that shares a lot of nomenclature with the German Prädikat system. Thus, if a label states the winegrowing region followed by the letter combination “DAC” (e.g. Kamptal DAC) we are talking about a regionally typical quality wine. All Austrian quality wines have a round, red and white striped "Banderole" on the capsule, which ensures, that it has been inspected and approved by the government tasting authority and fulfills the requirements for “Qualitätswein”, such as maximum yields per hectare, minimum must weight and alcohol levels and guaranteed origin of the grapes.

DACs are created for specific regions to establish clearly the local stylistic profile, in alignment with the French concept of terroir. Like in AOC, DAC wines are labelled only with the regional name and not the varietal unless more than one varietal is allowed. Wines carrying the name of a grape variety or a vintage year must be composed of at least 85% of that grape or vintage, respectively.

== Background ==
In the 1985 diethylene glycol wine scandal, several Austrian wineries illegally adulterated their wines using the toxic substance diethylene glycol to make the wines appear sweeter and more full-bodied in the style of late harvest wines. Resulting from the scandal, much stricter wine laws were enacted, and the Austrian wine industry focused production primarily on dry white wines instead of sweet wines.

For these dry wines, the Prädikatswein designations (such as Spätlese or Auslese) shared with the German wine classification system, were seen as less suitable. Just as in Germany, much of the high-end dry wines therefore ended up using the designation "Qualitätswein", which in principle was seen as below the Prädikatswein. In Wachau, regional designations for dry wines were created as a response; Steinfeder, Federspiel and Smaragd. However, several organisations pressed in the 1990s for a different national system to be introduced, with "appellation-style" designations based on geographical origin rather than on must weight, with regulations for each DAC regarding allowed grape varieties and wine styles.

The result was the Districtus Austriae Controllatus system, the framework regulations of which was introduced in 2001. The first DAC region to be approved was Weinviertel DAC, which happened in 2003, with the designation possible to use from the 2002 vintage.

Rules for individual DACs are developed by regional committees which include representation from grape growers and wine producers, wine cooperatives, and wine merchants. The DAC requirements must at least correspond to those for Austrian Qualitätswein and the underlying European Union wine regulations, but the committees are free to set higher standards for a specific DAC. Each wine to be sold as DAC has to be submitted to a tasting committee. It has been common for the DACs to include two quality levels, Klassik for a "standard" DAC wine, and the additional designation Reserve for a DAC wine which fulfills slightly stricter or different requirements.

== Effects of DAC introduction ==
Once a winegrowing region receives DAC status, the region's name may only be used for wines that fulfill the DAC regulations. Other wines, such as those made from other grape varieties, are no longer allowed to use the region's name. This typically means that the name of the larger wine region, of which the DAC forms a part, has to be used instead, e.g. "Niederösterreich" instead of "Weinviertel".

== DAC regions ==
Gebietsweine	Without a more specific geographical indication
Ortsweine	With indication of municipality
Riedenweine	With indication of single vineyard site

№	DAC designation	Further Level	First vintage	Permitted grape varieties	Alcohol level	Wine style
1	Weinviertel DAC (white only)	Klassik	2002	Grüner Veltliner	Min 12%	Aromatic, spicy and peppery; no oak or botrytis notes
1	Weinviertel DAC (white only)	Reserve	2009	Grüner Veltliner	Min 13%	Dry, full-bodied and spicy, oak aging and subtle botrytis notes allowed
2	Mittelburgenland DAC (red only)	Klassik	2005	Blaufränkisch	In general min 12.5%, max 13%. From a single vineyard site: min 13%, max 13.5%.	Fruit-driven, spicy, full-bodied, matured in either stainless steel tanks, oak casks or oak barrels
2	Mittelburgenland DAC (red only)	Reserve	2005	Blaufränkisch	Min 13%	Fruit-driven, spicy, full-bodied, must be matured in either large oak casks or small oak barrels
3	Traisental DAC (white only)	Klassik	2006	Grüner Veltliner or Riesling	Min 12%	Grüner Veltliner: aromatic, spicy, no botrytis or oak notes. Riesling: intensive, full-bodied, aromatic, mineral notes, no botrytis or oak notes
3	Traisental DAC (white only)	Reserve	2006	Grüner Veltliner or Riesling	Min 13%	Grüner Veltliner: aromatic, spicy, no botrytis or oak notes. Riesling: intensive, full-bodied, aromatic, mineral notes, no botrytis or oak notes
4	Kremstal DAC (white only)	Klassik	2006	Grüner Veltliner or Riesling	Min 12%	Grüner Veltliner: fresh, fruit-driven aromas, aromatic, gentle spice, no botrytis or oak notes. Riesling: aromatic, intensive stone fruit aromas, elegant, mineral notes, no botrytis or oak notes
4	Kremstal DAC (white only)	Reserve	2006	Grüner Veltliner or Riesling	Min 13%	As above with the following differences: opulent, full-bodied with density and with great length, pronounced varietal character. Subtle botrytis and oak aging aromas are allowed.
5	Kamptal DAC (white only)	Klassik	2008	Grüner Veltliner or Riesling	Min 12%	Grüner Veltliner: fruit-driven, gentle spice, no botrytis or no oak notes. Riesling: delicate, aromatic, intensive fruit, elegant, mineral notes, no oak notes, none or only little botrytis
5	Kamptal DAC (white only)	Reserve	2008	Grüner Veltliner or Riesling	Min 13%	As above with the following differences: opulent, full-bodied with a lingering finish, pronounced regional and varietal character. Subtle botrytis or oak aging notes are allowed.
6	Leithaberg DAC	White	2009	Pinot blanc, Chardonnay, Neuburger, Grüner Veltliner, alone or as a blend	Min 12.5%, max 13.5%	Regional typicity in taste and bouquet. Fruity, spicy bouquet with primary fruit aromas. Compact, spicy, delicate taste with minerals, little or no use of oak.
6	Leithaberg DAC	Red	2008	Min 85% Blaufränkisch, may be blended with up to 15% St. Laurent, Zweigelt or Pinot noir	Min 12.5%, max 13.5%	Regional typicity in taste and bouquet. Fruity, spicy bouquet with primary fruit aromas. Compact, spicy, delicate taste with minerals, little or no use of oak.
7	Eisenberg DAC (red only)	Klassik	2009	Blaufränkisch	Min 12.5%, max 13%	Fruit-driven, mineral and spicy aromas, little or not notable oak aromas
7	Eisenberg DAC (red only)	Reserve	2008	Blaufränkisch	Min 13%	Fruity, mineral and spicy notes, full-bodied. (May have oak aromas.)
8	Neusiedlersee DAC	Klassik (dry)	2011	Min 85% Zweigelt	Min 12%	Typical for the variety, fruity, spicy, aging in oak barrels or stainless steel
8	Neusiedlersee DAC	Klassik (fruity sweet)	Not specified	All white Qualitätswein grape varieties	Not specified, but min residual sugar content: 45 g/L	Wines have to match the characteristics of Spätlese or Auslese wines
8	Neusiedlersee DAC	Reserve	2010	Min 60% Zweigelt, the rest indigenous grape varieties	Min 13%	Typical for the variety, fruity, spicy, powerful, aging in traditional large oak casks or small oak barrels (barriques)
8	Neusiedlersee DAC	Reserve (nobly sweet)	Not specified	All white Qualitätswein grape varieties	Not specified, but min residual sugar content: 45 g/L	Wines have to match the characteristics of Beerenauslese or Trockenbeerenauslese wines
9	Wiener Gemischter Satz DAC	Klassik	2013	Dominant grape variety max. 50%, third grape variety min. 10%	Max 12.5%	dry, little oak notes
9	Wiener Gemischter Satz DAC	Ried	2013	Dominant grape variety max. 50%, third grape variety min. 10%	Min 12.5%	dry
10	Rosalia DAC	Klassik Red	2017	Blaufränkisch, Zweigelt	Min 12%	Rich in finesse, fruit-driven aromas, spicy, aromatic
10	Rosalia DAC	Reserve Red	2017	Blaufränkisch, Zweigelt	Min 13%	Rich in finesse, fruit-driven aromas, spicy, aromatic
10	Rosalia DAC	Rosé	2017	One or more red Qualitätswein grape varieties	Not specified	Fresh, fruit-driven aromas, spicy
11	Vulkanland Steiermark DAC	Gebietsweine	2018	Welschriesling, Pinot blanc, Chardonnay, Pinot gris, Riesling, Gelber Muskateller, Sauvignon blanc, Traminer as well as cuvées made from them	Not specified. Instead: specifications for max. content of residual sugar and market release dates.	Fine element of mineral spice, subtle, regionally typical weight and substance. Increasing depth and expression of origin with more specific geographical indications.
11	Vulkanland Steiermark DAC	Ortsweine	2018	Two (not mandatory) focal varieties per municipality out of: Welschriesling, Pinot blanc, Chardonnay, Pinot gris, Riesling, Gelber Muskateller, Sauvignon blanc, Traminer as well as cuvées made from them	Not specified. Instead: specifications for max. content of residual sugar and market release dates.	Fine element of mineral spice, subtle, regionally typical weight and substance. Increasing depth and expression of origin with more specific geographical indications.
11	Vulkanland Steiermark DAC	Riedenweine	2018	Welschriesling, Pinot blanc, Chardonnay, Pinot gris, Riesling, Gelber Muskateller, Sauvignon blanc, Traminer as well as cuvées made from them	Not specified. Instead: specifications for max. content of residual sugar and market release dates.	Fine element of mineral spice, subtle, regionally typical weight and substance. Increasing depth and expression of origin with more specific geographical indications.
12	Südsteiermark DAC	Gebietsweine	2018	Welschriesling, Pinot blanc, Chardonnay, Pinot gris, Riesling, Gelber Muskateller, Sauvignon blanc, Traminer as well as cuvées made from them	Not specified. Instead: specifications for max. content of residual sugar and market release dates.	Fine element of mineral spice, subtle, regionally typical weight and substance. Increasing depth and expression of origin with more specific geographical indications.
12	Südsteiermark DAC	Ortsweine	2018	Two (not mandatory) focal varieties per municipality out of: Welschriesling, Pinot blanc, Chardonnay, Pinot gris, Riesling, Gelber Muskateller, Sauvignon blanc, Traminer as well as cuvées made from them	Not specified. Instead: specifications for max. content of residual sugar and market release dates.	Fine element of mineral spice, subtle, regionally typical weight and substance. Increasing depth and expression of origin with more specific geographical indications.
12	Südsteiermark DAC	Riedenweine	2018	Welschriesling, Pinot blanc, Chardonnay, Pinot gris, Riesling, Gelber Muskateller, Sauvignon blanc, Traminer as well as cuvées made from them	Not specified. Instead: specifications for max. content of residual sugar and market release dates.	Fine element of mineral spice, subtle, regionally typical weight and substance. Increasing depth and expression of origin with more specific geographical indications.
13	Weststeiermark DAC	Gebietsweine	2018	Blauer Wildbacher (as Schilcher), Welschriesling, Pinot blanc, Chardonnay, Pinot gris, Riesling, Gelber Muskateller, Sauvignon blanc, Traminer as well as cuvées made from them	Not specified. Instead: specifications for max. content of residual sugar and market release dates.	Fine element of mineral spice, subtle, regionally typical weight and substance. Increasing depth and expression of origin with more specific geographical indications.
13	Weststeiermark DAC	Ortsweine	2018	Two (not mandatory) focal varieties per municipality out of: Blauer Wildbacher (as Schilcher), Welschriesling, Pinot blanc, Chardonnay, Pinot gris, Riesling, Gelber Muskateller, Sauvignon blanc, Traminer as well as cuvées made from them	Not specified. Instead: specifications for max. content of residual sugar and market release dates.	Fine element of mineral spice, subtle, regionally typical weight and substance. Increasing depth and expression of origin with more specific geographical indications.
13	Weststeiermark DAC	Riedenweine	2018	Blauer Wildbacher (as Schilcher), Welschriesling, Pinot blanc, Chardonnay, Pinot gris, Riesling, Gelber Muskateller, Sauvignon blanc, Traminer as well as cuvées made from them	Not specified. Instead: specifications for max. content of residual sugar and market release dates.	Fine element of mineral spice, subtle, regionally typical weight and substance. Increasing depth and expression of origin with more specific geographical indications.
14	Carnuntum DAC	Gebietsweine	2019	White: Pinot blanc, Chardonnay, Grüner Veltliner (blends have to consist of min. 2/3 of those varieties, rest: other Qualitätswein varieties) Red: Blaufränkisch, Zweigelt (blends have to consist of min. 2/3 of those varieties, rest: other Qualitätswein varieties)	White: not specified Red: min. 12.0% vol.	Carnuntum's reds and whites all exhibit an inherent finesse and power. Zweigelt and Blaufränkisch (whose focus lies in the eastern end of the region on the Spitzerberg) both express an elegant, robust character in a lively and refreshing style. White Carnuntum DAC marries opulent fruit with firm structure.
14	Carnuntum DAC	Ortsweine	2019	White: Pinot blanc, Chardonnay, Grüner Veltliner (blends have to consist of min. 2/3 of those varieties, rest: other Qualitätswein varieties) Red: Blaufränkisch, Zweigelt (blends have to consist of min. 2/3 of those varieties, rest: other Qualitätswein varieties)	White: not specified Red: min. 12.0% vol.	Carnuntum's reds and whites all exhibit an inherent finesse and power. Zweigelt and Blaufränkisch (whose focus lies in the eastern end of the region on the Spitzerberg) both express an elegant, robust character in a lively and refreshing style. White Carnuntum DAC marries opulent fruit with firm structure.
14	Carnuntum DAC	Riedenweine	2019	White: Pinot blanc, Chardonnay, Grüner Veltliner (blends have to consist of min. 2/3 of those varieties, rest: other Qualitätswein varieties) Red: Blaufränkisch, Zweigelt (blends have to consist of min. 2/3 of those varieties, rest: other Qualitätswein varieties)	White: not specified Red: min. 12.0% vol.	Carnuntum's reds and whites all exhibit an inherent finesse and power. Zweigelt and Blaufränkisch (whose focus lies in the eastern end of the region on the Spitzerberg) both express an elegant, robust character in a lively and refreshing style. White Carnuntum DAC marries opulent fruit with firm structure.
15	Wachau DAC	Gebietsweine	2020	Grüner Veltliner, Riesling, Pinot blanc, Pinot gris, Chardonnay, Neuburger, Muskateller, Sauvignon blanc, Traminer, Frühroter Veltliner, Müller-Thurgau, Muskat Ottonel, Roter Veltliner, Gemischter Satz, Pinot Noir, St. Laurent, Zweigelt	Not specified	Very little or no oak notes
15	Wachau DAC	Ortsweine	2020	Grüner Veltliner, Riesling, Pinot blanc, Pinot gris, Chardonnay, Neuburger, Muskateller, Sauvignon blanc, Traminer	Not specified	Very little or no oak notes
15	Wachau DAC	Riedenweine	2020	Grüner Veltliner, Riesling	Not specified	Very little or no oak notes
16	Ruster Ausbruch DAC	Not specified	Not specified	One or more white Qualitätswein grape varieties	Not specified	Wines have to match the characteristics of sweet Trockenbeerenauslese wines (e.g.: min must weight: 30°KMW)
17	Wagram DAC	Gebietsweine	2021	Chardonnay, Frühroter Veltliner, Pinot gris, Gelber Muskateller, Roter Veltliner, Sauvignon Blanc, Traminer, Pinot blanc, Riesling, Pinot noir, St. Laurent, Zweigelt as well as cuvées made from them	Not specified	Dry
17	Wagram DAC	Ortsweine	2021	Chardonnay, Grüner Veltliner, Roter Veltliner, Pinot blanc, Riesling, Pinot noir, Zweigelt	Not specified	Dry
17	Wagram DAC	Riedenweine	2021	Grüner Veltliner, Roter Veltliner, Riesling	Not specified	Dry
18	Thermenregion DAC	Gebietsweine	2023	Rotgipfler, Zierfandler, Pinot blanc, Pinot gris, Chardonnay, Neuburger, Pinot noir, St. Laurent, Blauer Portugieser, Zweigelt as well as cuvées made from them	Min 12%	Dry
18	Thermenregion DAC	Ortsweine	2023	Rotgipfler, Zierfandler, Pinot blanc, Pinot gris, Chardonnay, Pinot noir, St. Laurent, Zweigelt as well as cuvées made from them	Min 12%	Dry
18	Thermenregion DAC	Riedenweine	2023	Rotgipfler, Zierfandler, Weißburgunder, Chardonnay, Blauer Burgunder, St. Laurent as well as cuvées made from them	Min 12.5%	Whites: dry. Reds: max residual sugar content: 4 g/L.
