= Schilcherland DAC =

Schilcherland DAC is an official wine region in Austria. It is the tenth specific winegrowing region in the DAC, and was formerly known as Weststeiermark. Blauer Wildbacher, a red wine variety, is used to make a rosé wine called Schilcher. Schilcherland DAC Klassik must be vinified dry, and must have a minimum alcohol content of 11% and a maximum alcohol content of 12%. Schilcherland DAC Klassik may have a maximum of 3 g/L residual sugar; Schilcherland DAC with indication of single vineyard/cru site is allowed up to 4 g/L residual sugar.
