= Raifler =

Raifler is an alternative name to several wine grape varieties including:

- Green Hungarian
- Roter Veltliner
- Zierfandler
