= Weinviertel DAC =

Weinviertel DAC is an official wine region in Austria and was the first controlled designation of origin in Austria. This Lower Austrian region produces also almost half of the worldwide total of Grüner Veltliner. Weinviertel DAC is aromatic and spicy, with pepper notes, no botrytis, and no oak notes. Weinviertel DAC Reserve is dry, full-bodied, spicy, with subtle botrytis notes and oak aging both allowed.
