= Moserhof =

- Native name: Landhaus Moserhof
- Industry: Hotel
- Founded: 1437
- Headquarters: Wiener Straße 53, A-2352 Gumpoldskirchen, Lower Austria, Austria
- Website: www.landhaus-moserhof.eu

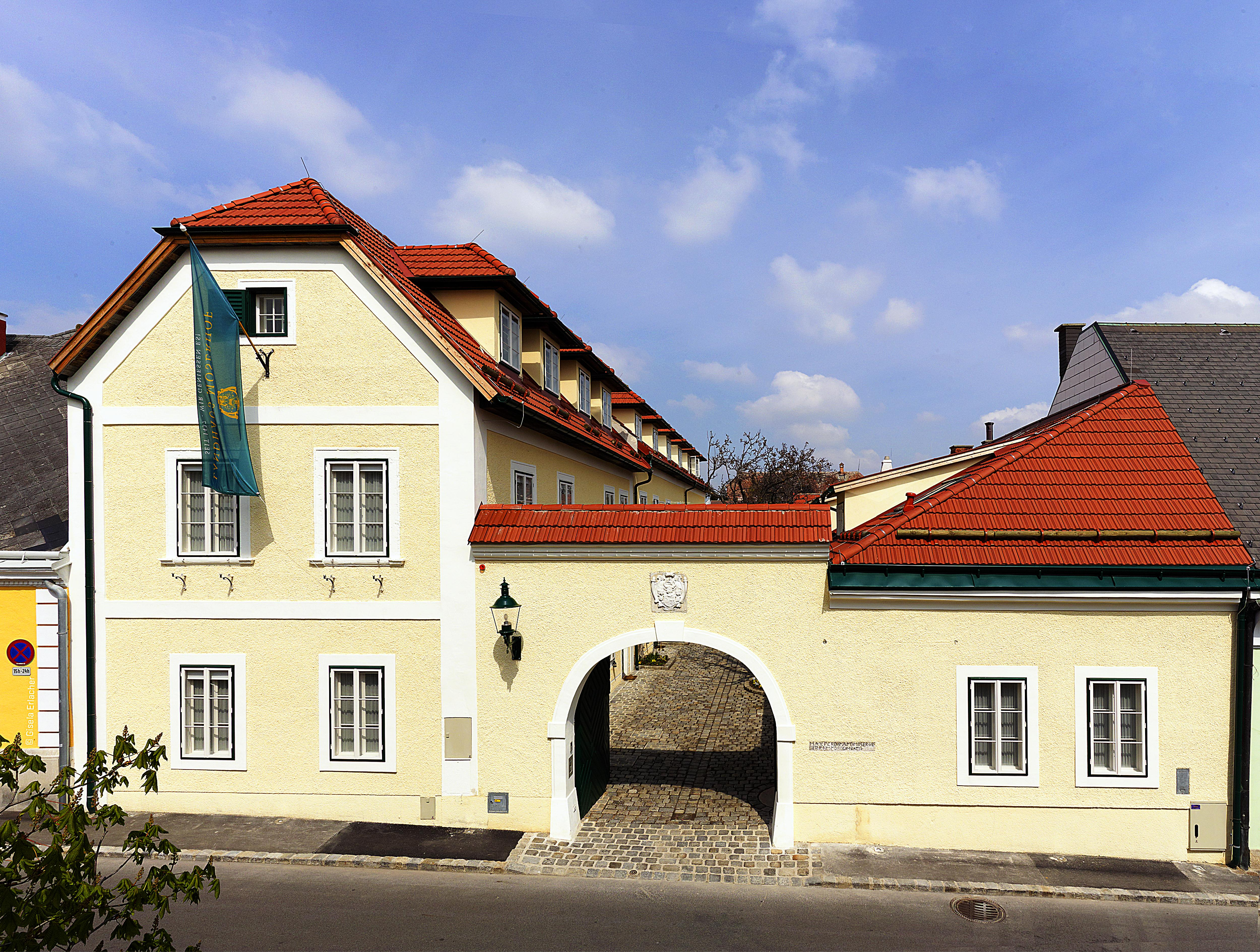
Hotel Landhaus Moserhof

Moserhof is a traditional inn located in Gumpoldskirchen town, Austria and founded in 1437.

In 2012 it was renovated and visitors can select modern or traditional room decoration. Nearby are local tourist attractions Church St. Michael, Town Hall, etc.

== See also ==
- List of oldest companies
