= Malverina =

Variety of grape

- Grape (Vitis)
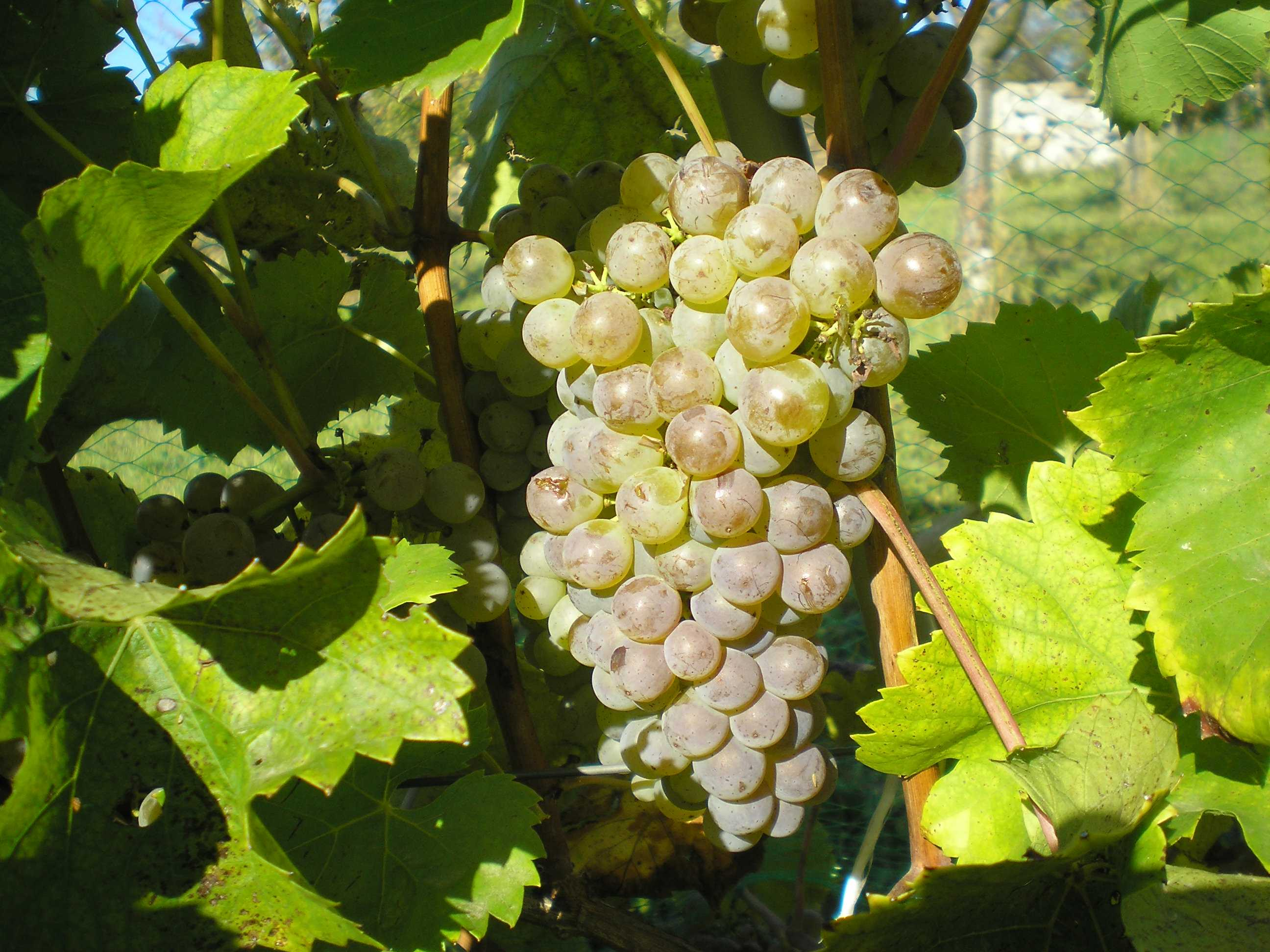
- Malverina grape
- Color of berry skin: Green to Reddish
- Species: Officially Vitis vinifera but also has other species in its pedigree
- Origin: Moravia, Czechoslovakia
- Original pedigree: (Villard Blanc × Roter Veltliner) × (Merlot x Seibel 13666)
- Notable regions: Moravia
- Breeder: Milos Michlovsky, Frantisek Madl, Vilem Kraus and Lubomir Glos
- Breeding institute: Vinselekt Perna, Mendel University in Brno Faculty of Horticulture
- VIVC number: 17523

Malverina is a grape variety used for making white wine. It was created in the former Czechoslovakia by a group called Vine Research Centre Resistant. Malverina is a result of an inter-specific breeding "Rakish" (Villard Blanc × Roter Veltliner) × "Merlan" (Merlot x Seibel 13666). Its high resistance against both powdery and downy mildew makes it suitable for producing wines in limited-spray vineyards. Grapes ripen in mid-October. Malverina is grown in Moravia. High quality wines aged in bottles are full-bodied with distinctive cinnamon aroma and with long persistence.
