= Kremstal DAC =

Kremstal DAC is an official wine region in Austria. The first vintage was 2006. Allowed grape varieties are Grüner Veltliner or Riesling. The wine must be vinified to an Alcohol by volume of 12% or greater. Grüner Veltliner must be fresh, fruit-driven aromas, aromatic, with gentle spice, and no botrytis or oak notes. Riesling must be aromatic, with intensive stone fruit aromas, elegant, mineral notes, and no botrytis or oak notes. Reserve wines wine must be vinified to an Alcohol by volume of minimum of 13%; subtle botrytis and oak aging aromas are allowed for Reserve wines.
