= Ganzeltopf =

Ganzeltopf is a traditional Alsatian goose dish, popular at Christmas, prepared much like a conserve and simmered in the oven with winter vegetables and eaten with a bottle of Sylvaner. Alsace is a region situated in the East of France along the Rhine river. It was part of Germany until being annexed by France after the Thirty Years' War.
