= Roesler =

Variety of grape

- Grape (Vitis)
- Species: Vitis vinifera
- Origin: Austria
- Breeder: Dr. Gertraud Mayer
- VIVC number: 15438

Roesler is a red Austrian wine grape developed in 1970 by Dr. Gertraud Mayer at Höhere Bundeslehranstalt und das Bundesamt für Wein- und Obstbau in Klosterneuburg, Austria. It is the result of a crossing Zweigelt x (Seyve-Villard 18-402 x Blaufränkisch). It is named after the former director of Austria's oldest viticultural college, Leonard Roesler (1839–1910), who was a German-Austrian chemist and oenologist. The variety is deep in colour and with abundant extract. It is frost resistant and can withstand temperatures as low as -25°C (-13°F). It is also resistant to mildew.
