= Spätrot-Rotgipfler =

Spätrot-Rotgipfler is a wine produced in the Thermenregion in Austria, particularly in the Gumpoldskirchen district. It is a blend of the two varieties Zierfandler (synonym: Spätrot) and Rotgipfler. Zierfandler is said to contribute finesse, while Rotgipfler contributes with strength and a higher alcohol, and the wine often has asparagus aromas. Spätrot-Rotgipfler is often produced as Prädikatswein, with more or less pronounced sweetness, and is long-lived.
