= Rotgipfler =

Variety of grape

- Grape (Vitis)
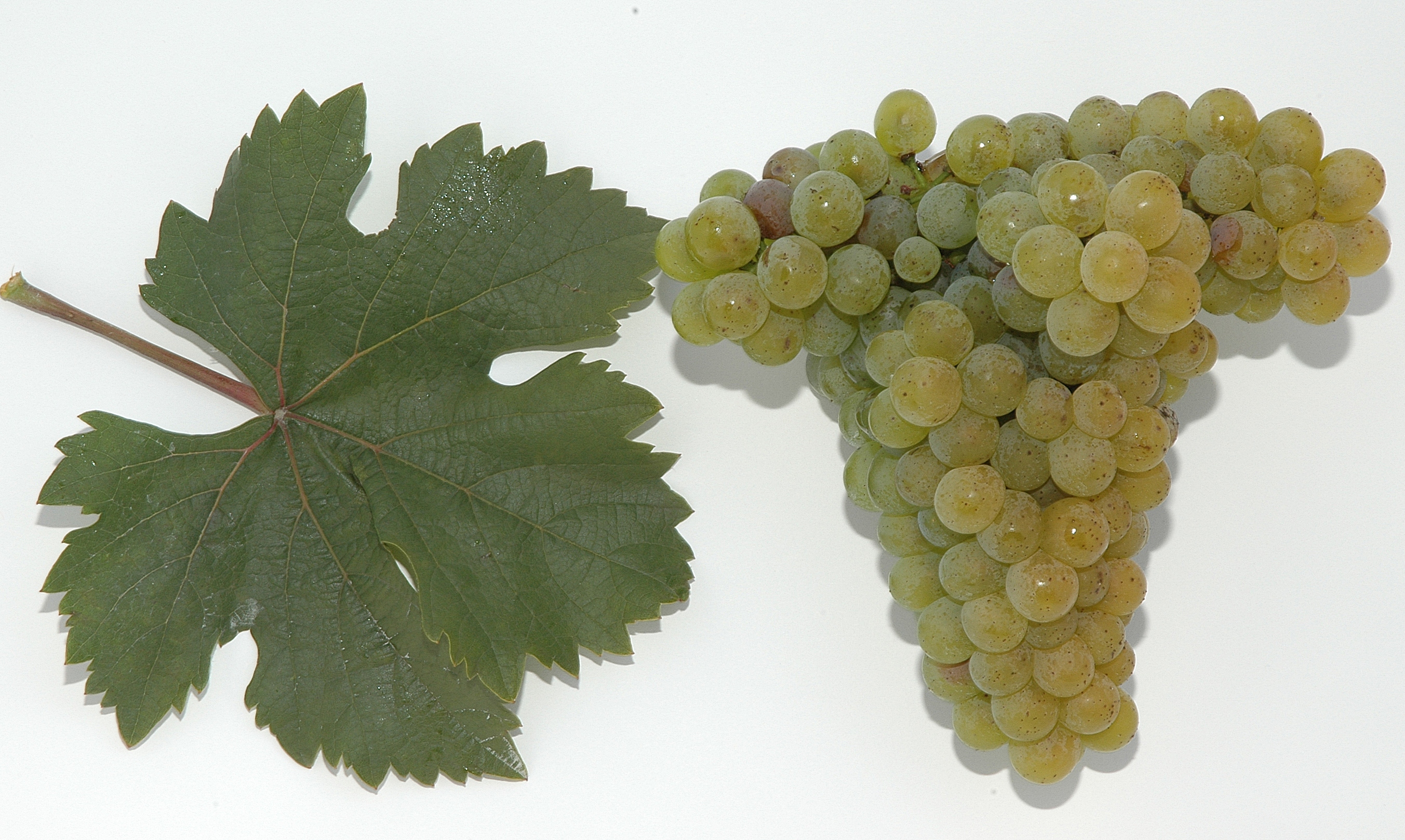
- Species: Vitis vinifera
- Also called: Reifler, Rotreifler
- Origin: Austria
- Notable regions: Gumpoldskirchen in Thermenregion
- Notable wines: Spätrot-Rotgipfler
- VIVC number: 10231

Rotgipfler is a grape variety used to make aromatic white wine. It is almost exclusively found in the Gumpoldskirchen district of the Thermenregion in Austria. It is often blended with Zierfandler (which is also known as Spätrot) to make Spätrot-Rotgipfler. It is also increasingly used for quality wines. Such Rotgipfler wines are powerful, high in alcohol and suitable for cellaring.

In 1999 there were 118.42 hectares (292.6 acres) of Rotgipfler vineyards in Austria.

Rotgipfler has been named for the red tips of its vine leaves. The earliest known mention of Rotgipfler was in 1837 in Steiermark by Johann Burger. Rotgipfler has been identified as a cross between Traminer and Roter Veltliner.

== See also ==
- Austrian wine
