= Neuburger =

Variety of grape

- Grape (Vitis)
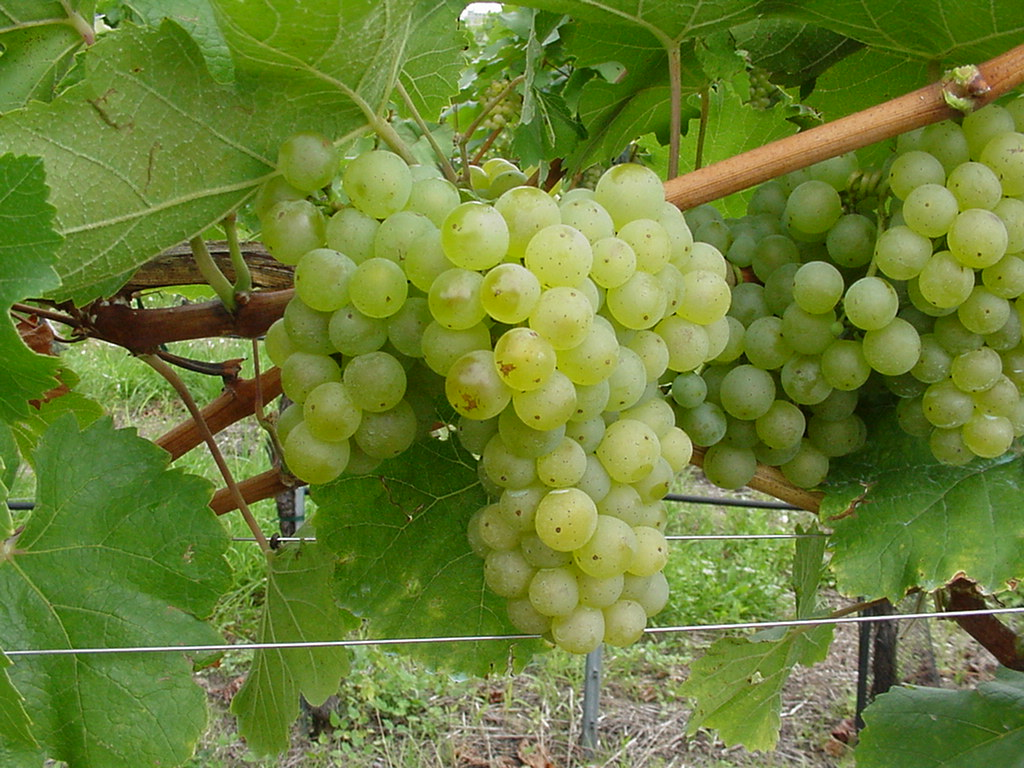
- Color of berry skin: Blanc
- Species: Vitis vinifera
- Also called: see list of synonyms
- Origin: Austria
- VIVC number: 8501

Neuburger is a white Austrian wine grape. The grape is a crossing of Roter Veltliner and Sylvaner. As varietal, it generally produces full bodied wines.

== Synonyms ==
Neuburger is also known under the synonyms Brubler, Brugler, Feher Neuburger, Feher Neuburgi, Feher Neuburgi Ujvari, Neiburger, Neuburg, Neuburger Alb, Neuburger blanc, Neuburger Weisser, Neuburgi, Neuburgské, Neuburské, Neue Rebe, Neuburger Bijeli, Nojburger, Novogradski, Ujvari, Weisser Neuburger.
