= Frühroter Veltliner =

Variety of grape

- Grape (Vitis)
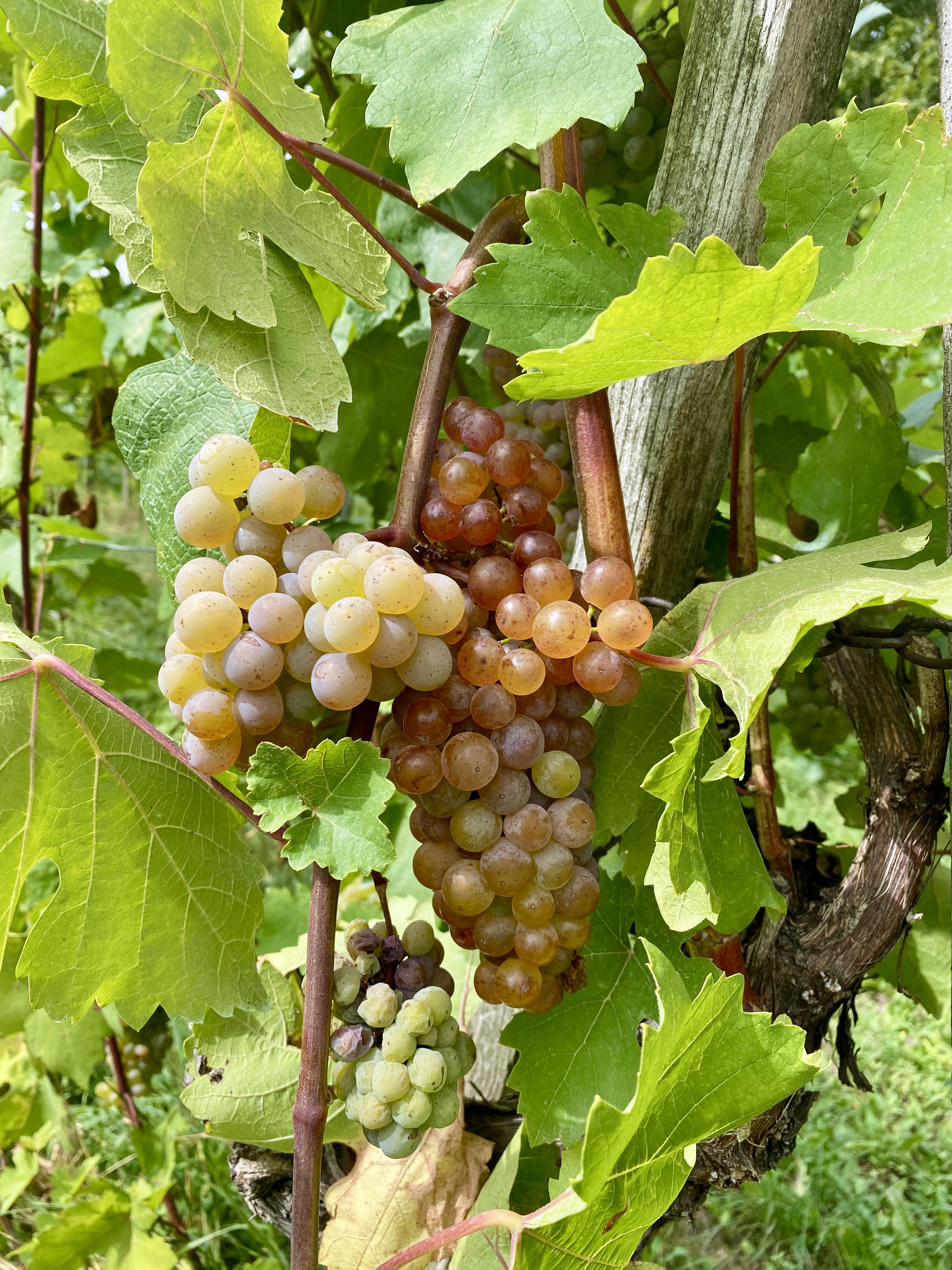
- Species: Vitis vinifera
- Also called: Veltliner Frührot, Früher Roter Veltliner, Malvasier (more)
- Origin: Austria
- Notable regions: Weinviertel district of Lower Austria
- VIVC number: 16157

Frühroter Veltliner is a variety of early-ripening, red-skinned white wine grape grown primarily in the Weinviertel district of Lower Austria. It accounts for 0.9% of total Austrian vineyards and is diminishing.

Frühroter Veltliner is not at all related to Grüner Veltliner, but is a spontaneous cross between Roter Veltliner and Silvaner. It is not particularly demanding of its location and is resistant to both winter and late frosts. However, it ripens very early producing wines of neutral bouquet, high alcohol and somewhat low acidity.

It is rarely encountered in the Rheinhessen of Germany, in some older vineyards of Alto Adige in Italy, and in the Savoie of France.

== Synonyms ==
Austria: Früher Roter Veltliner, Malvasier
France: Malvoisie Rouge d'Italie, Rose d'Italie
Germany: Frühroter Malvasier, Roter Malvasier
Italy: Veltliner
Czech: Veltlínské Červené Rané
Slovak: Veltlínske Červené Skoré

== See also ==
- Austrian wine
