= Österreichisch-Weiß =

Variety of grape

- Grape (Vitis)
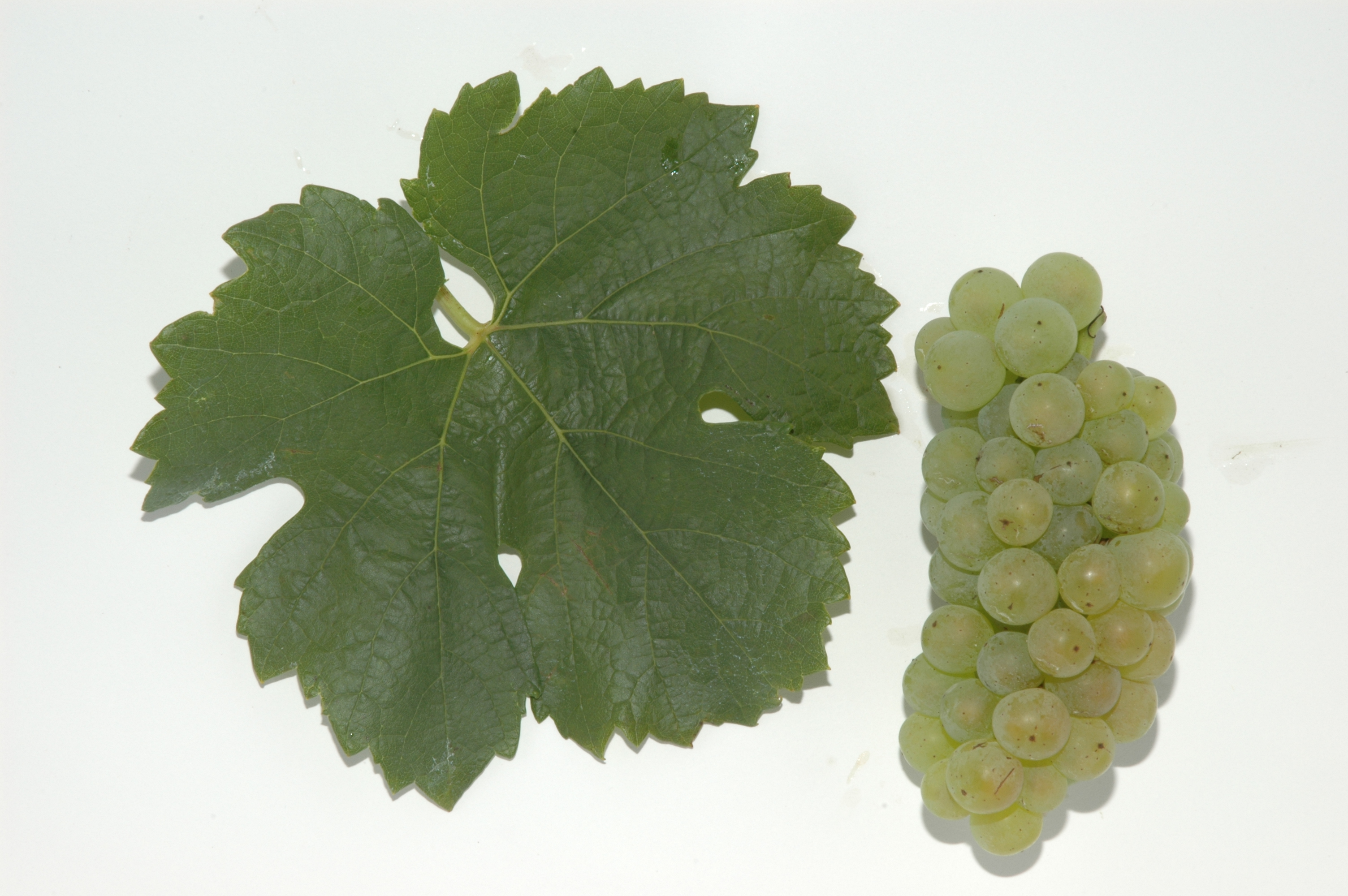
- Oesterreichisch Weiss, grape variety along with its leaf
- Color of berry skin: Blanc
- Species: Vitis vinifera
- Also called: Ausztriai (in Hungary), Ausztriai Feher, Blanke, Kahlenberger Weiße, Weiße
- Origin: Austria?
- VIVC number: 16840

Österreichisch-Weiß (German pronunciation: [ˈøːstəʁaɪçɪʃ vaɪs], lit. 'Austrian white') is a grape variety for white wine. It is now very rarely cultivated, but is noted for being one of the parents of Silvaner, the other parent being Traminer. Österreichisch-Weiß itself is the offspring of Weißer Heunisch (Gouais blanc) as father with an unknown mother variety.

In older times, Österreichisch-Weiß (up to 90%) blended with Traminer contributed to giving "Grinzinger" (wine from Grinzing in Vienna) a good reputation.

It is often confused with Brauner Veltliner. The name Österreicher has previously also been used as a synonym for Brauner Veltliner and Silvaner.
