= Schilcher (wine) =

Schilcher is a wine produced solely in the Austrian state of Styria, in the districts of Deutschlandsberg and Voitsberg. The Schilcher wine itself is a distinct rosé made from the indigenous Blauer Wildbacher grape. The colour ranges from a light onion tinge to a deep ruby. The grape was once a wild variety that was said to contain alcohol compounds that, allegedly, would induce wild inebriation, hence its colloquial name Rabiatperle - rabid pearl. Over time, Schilcher has become a regarded wine in Austria. The name Schilcher originates from the Middle High German word schillern meaning to radiate with colour.

== Wine style ==
Wine from the Schilcher grape is also used for blending and for the production of sparkling wine. The wine has a strong acidity and is renowned for its exclusive aroma, often associated with strawberries. It should be drunk relatively young at a temperature of 9 to 11 °C accompanied with traditional Austrian cold cured meats. Authentic Schilcher wine must carry the official emblem of the white horse (referring to the Lipizzans bred in Piber for the world-famous Spanish Riding School in Vienna) and also carry the official certification number of denomination.
