= Zierfandler =

Variety of grape

- Grape (Vitis)
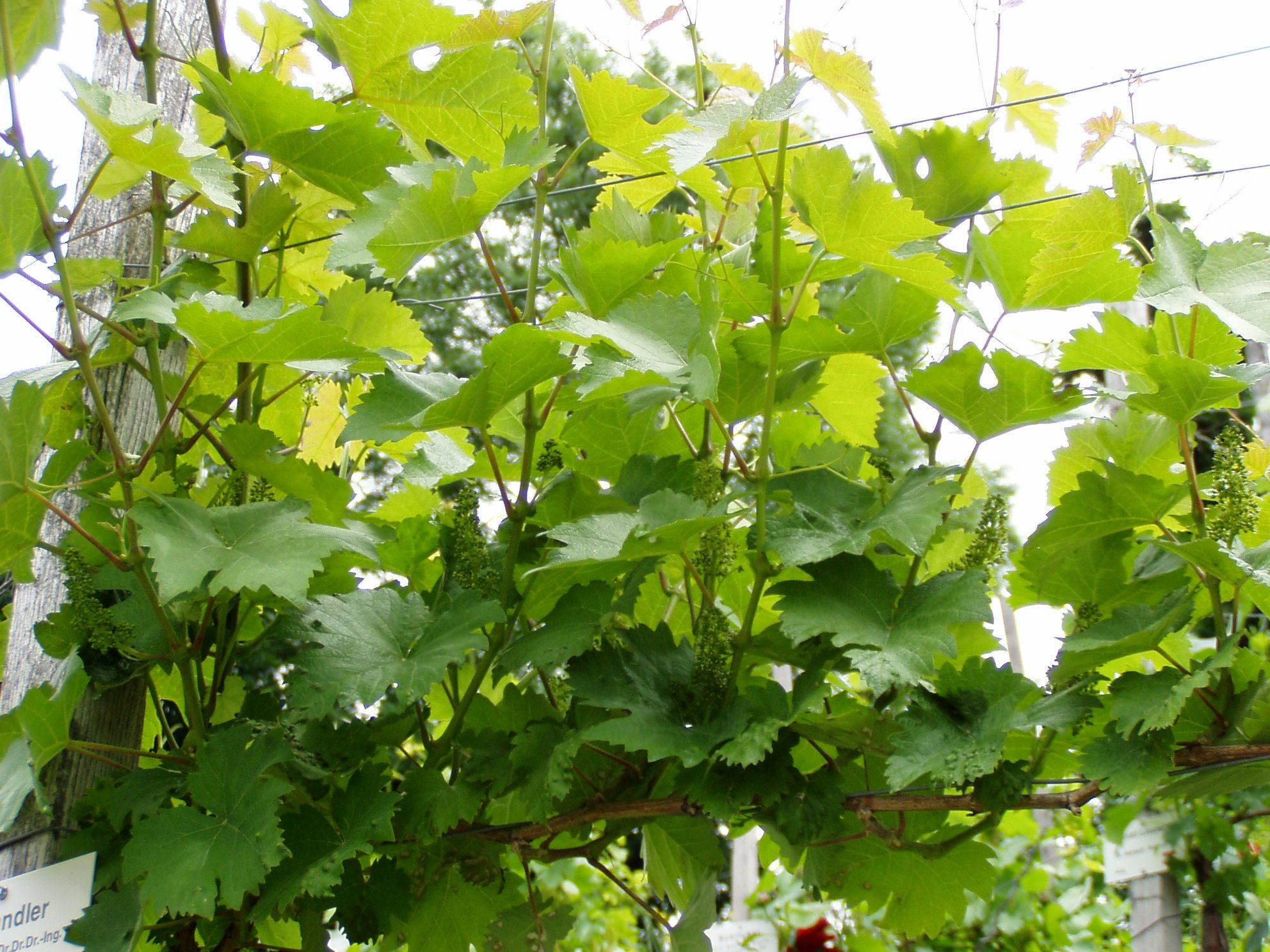
- Species: Vitis vinifera
- Also called: Spätrot, Cirfandli (more)
- Origin: Austria
- Notable regions: Thermenregion
- Notable wines: Spätrot-Rotgipfler
- VIVC number: 13443

Zierfandler is a grape variety used to make white wine in the Thermenregion of Austria. It is also known as Spätrot ("late red") because it turns red just before harvest time. It is traditionally blended with Rotgipfler but is increasingly being sold as a varietal wine. Zierfandler wines are typically elegant and quite sweet, but with much balancing acidity and a nutty bouquet of pistachios and almonds. They are capable of ageing well.

== History ==
Zierfandler is probably a cross between Roter Veltliner and something like Traminer. A "weiss" (white) form is found in Hungary.

Zierfandler may be the inadvertent origin of the name Zinfandel, which has its roots in a Croatian grape collected by the Habsburg monarchy in Vienna. George Gibbs, a horticulturist on Long Island, received several shipments of vines from the Imperial nursery in the 1820s, one of which he called "Black Zinfardel of Hungary". This doesn't correspond to any known grape, but Webster suggests that Zinfandel is a corruption of tzinifándli (czirifandli), a Hungarian word derived from the German word Zierfandler. Since Zierfandler is very different from Zinfandel, someone would have had to have mixed up labels along the way.

== Distribution and wines ==
There were 98.24ha in Austria in 2005, less than 0.3% of Austria vineyards, of which 85.03ha were in Thermenregion. It is traditionally blended with Rotgipfler in that region. These wines, known as Spätrot-Rotgipfler, are a particular speciality of Gumpoldskirchen, south of Vienna.

It is grown in Hungary under the name Cirfandli and in Slovenia as Zerjavina.

== Vine and viticulture ==
The characteristic of the grapes is the way the sides exposed to the sun turns red as they ripen. Zierfandler ripens late, and is prone to noble rot. The leaves are large and 3-5 lobed. The bunches are large, conical and sometimes winged.

== Synonyms ==
Cilifai, Cilifan, Cirfandli, Cirifai, Cirifai Piros, Cirifan, Gumpoldskirchener, Gumpoldskirchener Spätrot, Gumpoldskirchener Spätroth, Kesoei Piros, Kirmizi Zierfahndler, Nemes Cirfandli, Piros Cirfandli, Piroscirfandli, Raifler, Reifler Rot, Roter Raifler, Roter Reifler, Roter Zierfandler, Roth Hensch, Rother Raifler, Rother Zierfahndler, Rothhinschen, Rothreifler, Rotreifler, Rubiner, Spätrot, Zerjavina and Zierfandler Rot.

== See also ==
- Austrian wine
