= Roter Veltliner =

Variety of grape

- Grape (Vitis)
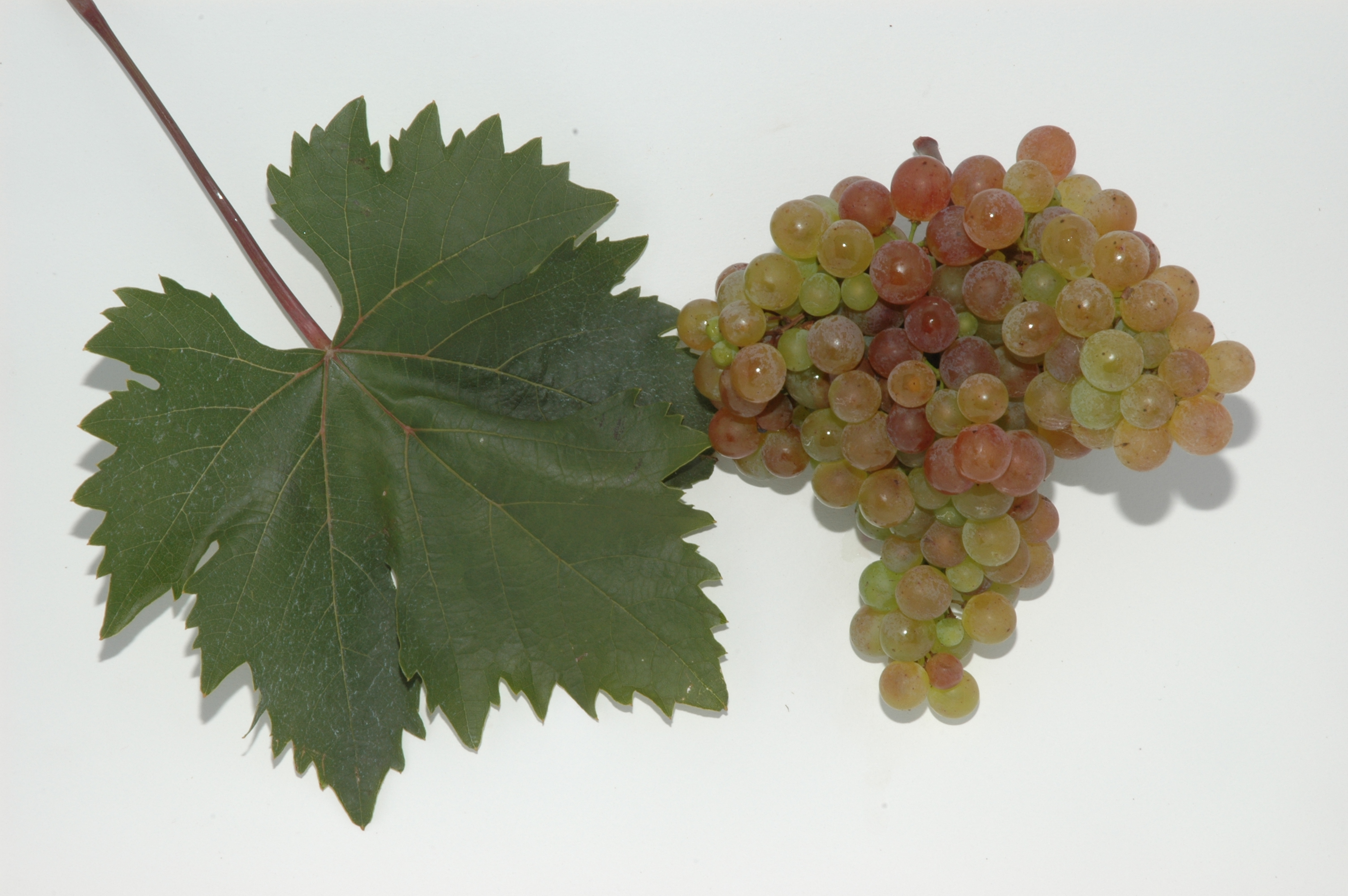
- Color of berry skin: Rose
- Species: Vitis vinifera
- Also called: Roter Muskateller, Roter Reifler
- Origin: Austria
- VIVC number: 12931

Roter Veltliner is a grape variety used to make white wine. It is found in Austria. Some of the better wines come from the Wagram district of Donauland.

== Varieties ==
It is believed to be a very old variety, but its parentage has so far not been possible to determine. There are however several other varieties which are the offspring of Roter Veltliner, such as:

- Frühroter Veltliner, a cross with Silvaner
- Neuburger, another cross with Silvaner
- Rotgipfler, a cross with Traminer
- Zierfandler, possibly a cross with Traminer

Despite its name Roter Veltliner is not related to Grüner Veltliner. It was previously believed that Roter Veltliner could be a grandparent to Grüner Veltliner, but that hypothesis seems to have lost credibility with later studies.

== Synonyms ==
Roter Veltliner is also known under the synonyms:

- Ariavina
- Ariavina Männliche
- Bakor
- Belo Ocka
- Belo Oka
- Buzyn
- Cerveny Muskatel
- Crvena Valtelina
- Crvena Valtelinka
- Csucsos Bakor
- Debela Ariavina
- Dreimänner
- Erdezha
- Erdezha Shopatna
- Erdezka Rabolina
- Fedleiner
- Feldleiner
- Feldleiner Rothlichter
- Feldliner
- Feldlinger
- Feltliner
- Fleisch Roter Velteliner
- Fleisch Roter Wälteliner
- Fleisch Traminer
- Fleischroter Traminer
- Fleischrother Velteliner
- Fleischrother Veltliner
- Fleischtraminer
- Fleischtraube
- Fleischtraube Rot
- Fleischweiner
- Grosbrauner Velteliner
- Grossbrauner
- Grosse Fleischtraube
- Grosser Fleischtraube
- Grosser Roter Veltliner
- Grosser Rother Välteliner
- Grosser Rother Veltliner
- Grosser Traminer
- Grosser Välteliner
- Grosser Velteliner
- Grosswiener
- Herera Rhaetica
- Herera Valtellina
- Kecskecsecs
- Krdeca
- Männliche Ariavina
- Mannliche
- Maucnjk
- Mavcnik
- Mavenick
- Mavenik
- Moseavina
- Moslavina
- Muscateller
- Muskatel Cerveny
- Nagy Veltelini
- Nagysagos
- Nyulsölö
- Nyulszölö
- Piros Veltelini
- Pirosveltelin
- Pirosveltelini
- Rabolina
- Raifler
- Raisin de Saint Valentin
- Ranfler
- Ranfolica
- Ranfolina
- Ranfoliza
- Raufler
- Raufolica
- Rebalina
- Rebolina
- Red Veltliner
- Reifler
- Rhaetica
- Riegersburger Rothköpfel
- Riegersburger Rothtöpfel
- Rivola Tchervena
- Rossera
- Rossola
- Rote Fleisch Traube
- Rote Fleischtraube
- Rote Fleischtrauble
- Roter
- Roter Muskateller
- Roter Riesling
- Roter Välteliner
- Roter Velteliner
- Roter Veltiner
- Roter Veltliner
- Rotgipfler
- Rothe Shopatna
- Rothe Shopotna
- Rothe Velteliner
- Rother Fleischtraube
- Rother Muscateller
- Rother Raifler
- Rother Riesling
- Rother Välteliner
- Rother Velteliner
- Rother Veltliner
- Rother Zierfahnler
- Rothgipfler
- Rothlichter
- Rothreifler
- Rotmehlweisser
- Rotmuskateller
- Rotreifler
- Rudeca
- Ryvola Cervena
- Ryvola Crvena
- Saint Valentin Rose
- Saint Valentinrose
- Shopatna
- Shopotna
- Somsölö
- Spaete Ranfoliza
- St. Valentin
- Tarant Cerveny
- Tarant Rot
- Todtraeger Rotreifler
- Traminer
- Uva di San Valentino
- Valentin
- Valentin Rouge
- Välteliner
- Välteliner Roter
- Valtelin Rouge
- Valteliner
- Vältliner
- Valteliner Rosso
- Valteliner Rouge
- Valteliner Tardif
- Veltelin Piros
- Veltelin Rosso
- Velteline Rouge
- Velteliner
- Velteliner Rose
- Velteliner Roso
- Velteliner Roter
- Velteliner Rother
- Velteliner Rouge
- Veltelini Piros
- Veltlinac Crveni
- Veltliner
- Veltliner Rosso
- Veltliner Rot Weiss
- Veltliner Roth
- Veltliner Rother
- Veltliner Rouge
- Veltlini Piros
- Veltlínské červené
- Veltlinski Rozovii
- Veltlinskii Rozovii
- Veltlinsky Rosovy
- Vernyeges Veltelini
- Verrnyeges Veltelini
- Weisser Raifler
- Weissholzige Ribula Maucnjk
- and Ziegelroth

== See also ==
- Austrian wine
