= Wildbacher =

Variety of grape

- Grape (Vitis)
- Species: Vitis vinifera
- Also called: Blauer Wildbacher
- Origin: Austria
- VIVC number: 13234

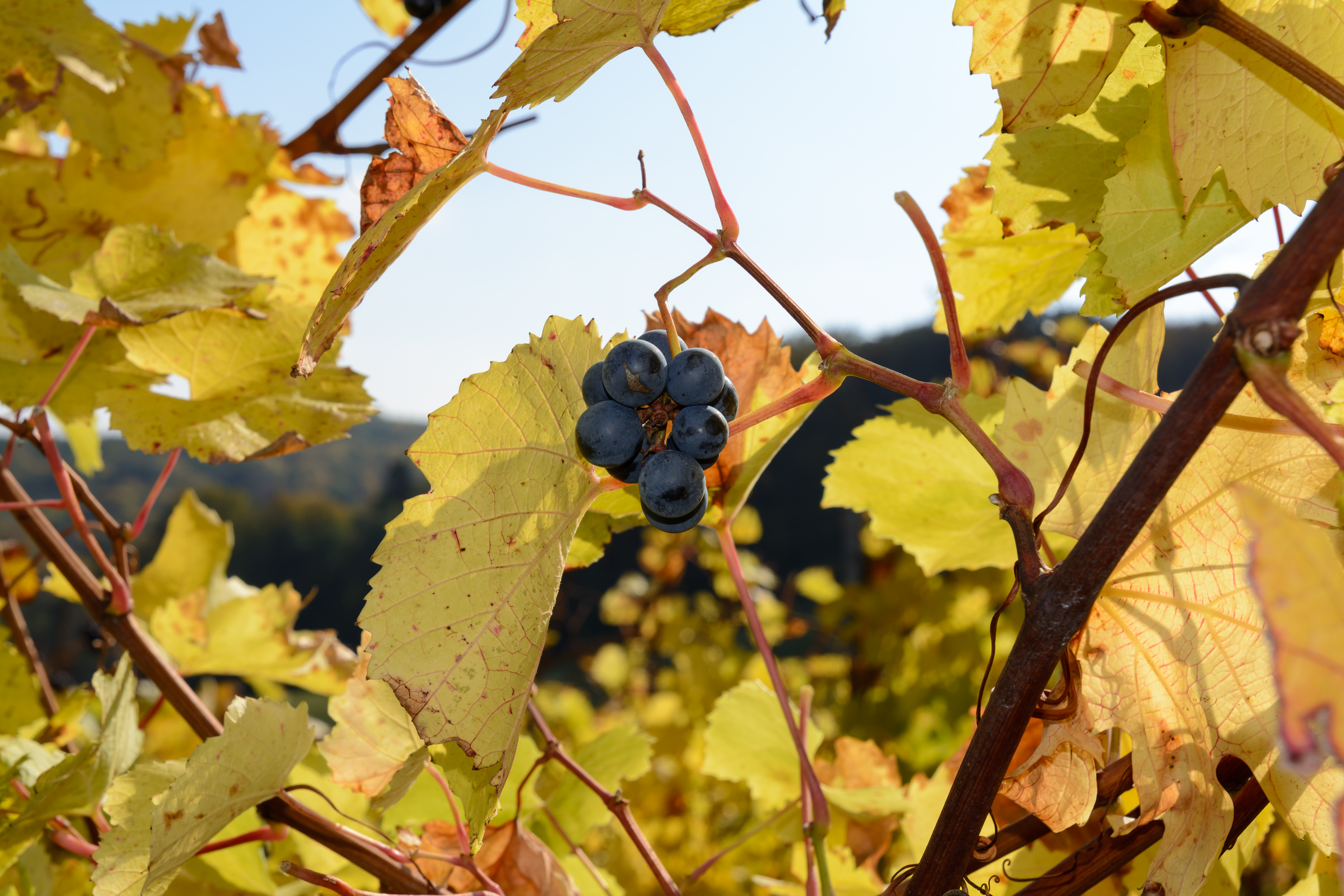
Wildbacher on the plant

Wildbacher is a dark-skinned grape variety and specialty of the Styria region of Austria.The name "Wildbacher" is derived from its supposed location of origin, Wildbach, which is part of the city of Deutschlandsberg. It is a very old variety said to go back to the Celts, and manuscripts first record the name in the 16th century. The variety is not particularly demanding in terms of soil though it does require warm sites with sufficient aeration as it is prone to rot. The grapes tend to ripen late and yields can be inconsistent. Wines made from Wildbacher typically exhibit red berry and herbal flavors with a refreshing acidity.

== Schilcher ==
Schilcher is a specialty red wine from Styria made from Wildbacher grapes. Genuine Schilcher comes exclusively from West Styria although this style of wine is also made in South Styria and Southeast Styria. Schilcher wines are rosés with pale red to straw shades and true Schilchers from West Styria can be identified by the presence of a Lipizzaner stallion on the bottle or cap. Schilcher wines are light, dry and fruity with a distinctive crisp acidity and should be drunk as young as possible.

== Italy ==
Wildbacher is also grown in the Veneto region of northeast Italy where it is generally used as a blending component, although Tenuta Col Sandago makes a 100% Wildbacher oak-aged red wine.

== See also ==
- Austrian wine
- Italian wine
