= Gumpoldskirchen =

Gumpoldskirchen Gumpoidskiachn
- Municipality
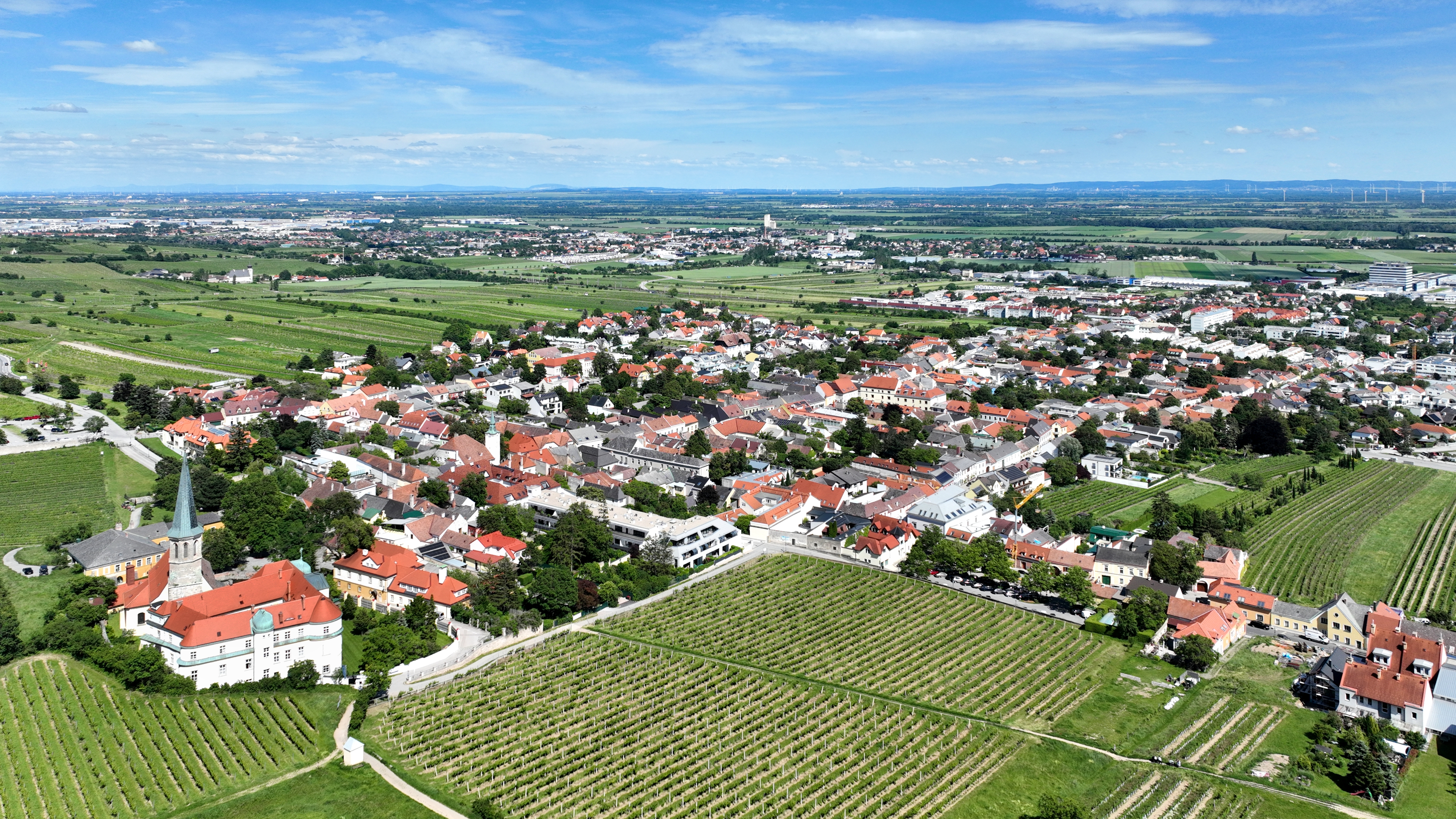
- General view of Gumpoldskirchen

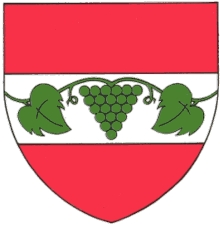
- Coat of arms

- Location within Austria
- Coordinates: 48°3′N 16°17′E
- Country: Austria
- State: Lower Austria
- District: Mödling

Government
  - Mayor: Ferdinand Köck (ÖVP)

Area
  - Total: 8.11 km^{2} (3.13 sq mi)
- Elevation: 250 m (820 ft)

Population (2018-01-01)
  - Total: 3,899
  - Density: 481/km^{2} (1,250/sq mi)
- Time zone: UTC+1 (CET)
  - Summer (DST): UTC+2 (CEST)
- Postal code: 2352
- Area code: 02252
- Website: www.gumpoldskirchen.at

Gumpoldskirchen (Central Bavarian: Gumpoidskiachn) is a town in the district of Mödling in the Austrian state of Lower Austria. Gumpoldskirchen borders on the municipalities Mödling, Guntramsdorf, Gaaden, Pfaffstätten and Traiskirchen. The municipal area extends from the flats in the Vienna Basin to forest areas of the Anninger in the Vienna Woods. Gumpoldskirchen is very famous for its wine, especially its Spätrot-Rotgipfler blend, and "Heurigers" as it attracts many tourists from Vienna to its hillside vineyards. Gumpoldskirchen derives its name from Gumpold of Passau.

== Climate ==
Gumpoldskirchen has a mild, continental climate attributed to its proximity to the spa line in Austria. The nearby Vienna Woods directly to the west affect the climate as well. There are 250 weather stations for the Central Institute for Meteorology and Geodynamics that call Gumpoldskirchen home.

== History ==
The Stone Age people settled the area about 6500 years ago. The Romans then settled in the area and it was found that an important road for transport went through the current city. Even from prehistoric times, earlier civilizations were cultivating wine on the slopes of the Eichkogel.

In the 14th century, Gumpoldskirchen was already a market and court location.

Gumpoldskirchen, like so many of its neighbor principalities, was devastated twice by the first and the second Turkish Sieges.

By the end of the 18th Century, Gumpoldskirchen began to industrialize. It had many factories and greatly assisted the rapid industrialization of the Austro-Hungarian Empire.

The main pipeline serving Vienna's water supply (I. Wiener Hochquellenleitung) opened in 1873, and runs adjacent to the town, supplying Vienna with drinking water from springs in Styria and Lower Austria. The pipeline's route is accompanied by a popular walking trail, called Wasserleitungsweg.

After the 1938 Anschluss, Gumpoldskirchen became a part of the Greater Vienna that the Nazis created. Toward the end of World War II, the area around Gumpoldskirchen became an area of intense battle between the coming Soviet troops and the remaining 6th SS Panzer Army.

Gumpoldskirchen was unfortunately caught up in the 1985 wine glycol scandal that saw many Austrian wine makers called out for inserting illegal (and potentially harmful) ingredients. The scandal caused harm to the Austrian wine industry that it is still fighting to overcome today.

== Population ==
Historical population
Year	Pop.	±%
1971	2,804	—
1981	2,978	+6.2%
1991	2,982	+0.1%
2001	3,233	+8.4%
2011	3,450	+6.7%

== Sights ==
=== Church St. Michael ===
St. Michael's church is a gothic cathedral in Gumpoldskirchen. A recently discovered crypt was found lying under the church.

=== Teutonic Order Castle ===
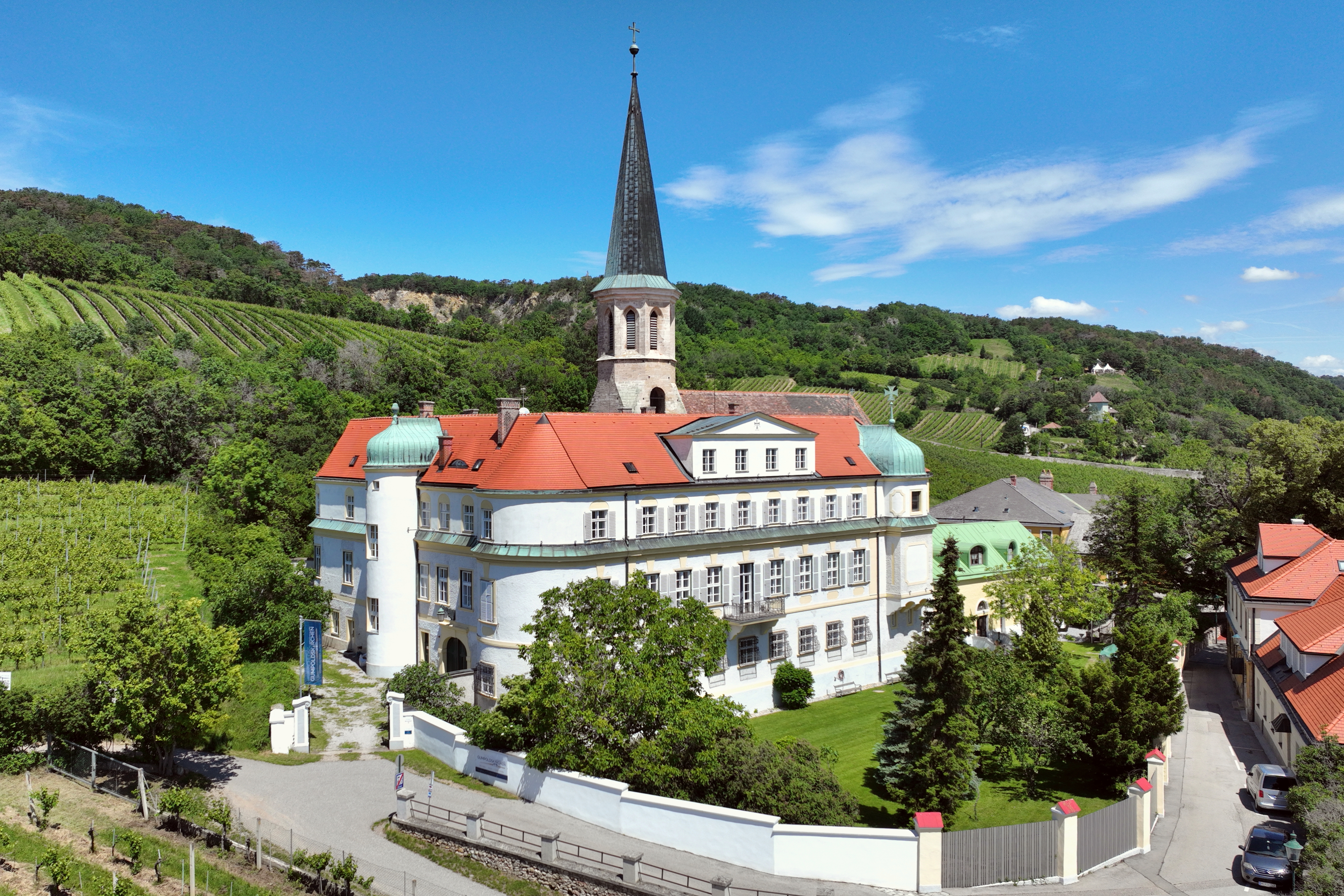
South view of Gumpoldskirchen Castle

This castle was first used by the Teutonic Order in 1241 and served as a fortress for the next few hundred years. The castle was rebuilt in 1931 and after the Anschluss, was converted to a research institute for winery. Damage occurred to the castle in the late years of World War II, and in 1946, it was given back to the church. In 1998 and 1999, the castle underwent renovations and today it serves as a popular guesthouse.

=== The Pillory ===
The pillory stands just outside town hall. It is a large stone built in 1563 with inscriptions chiseled on it. The pillory was a symbol of the market rights of the city. It was also used to punish lawbreakers who were then chained to the stone and sometimes even tortured and killed.

=== Town Hall ===
The old town hall was built during the Renaissance period and was originally a courthouse. The pillared hall can still be seen today on the second-floor. The town-hall still has old prison cells, however they are now used for storage.
