= Austrian wine =

Wine making in Austria

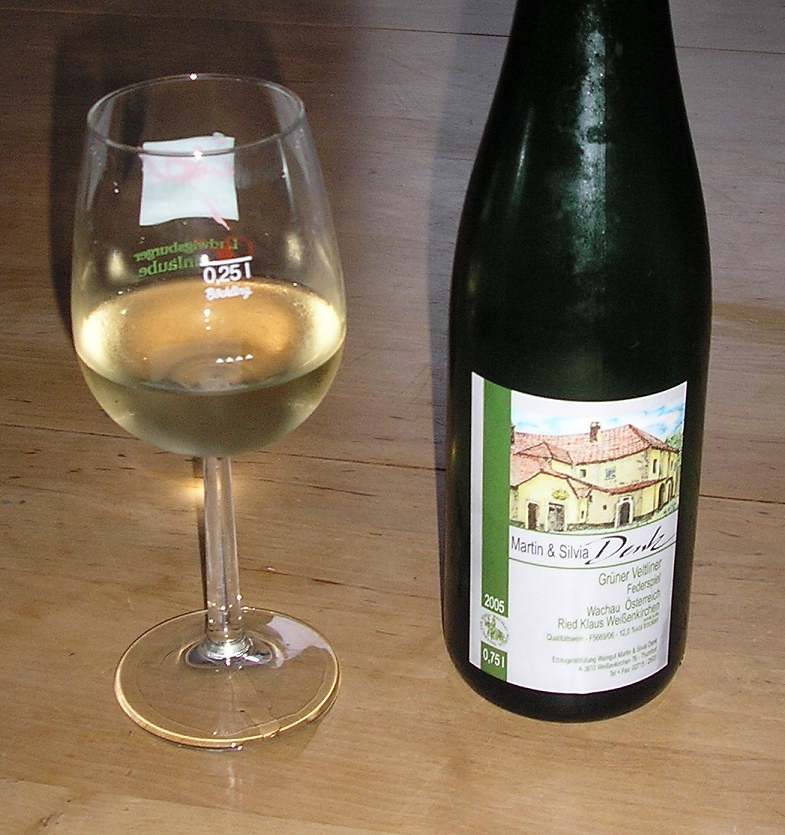
An Austrian wine made from Grüner Veltliner, by far the most grown variety in Austria.

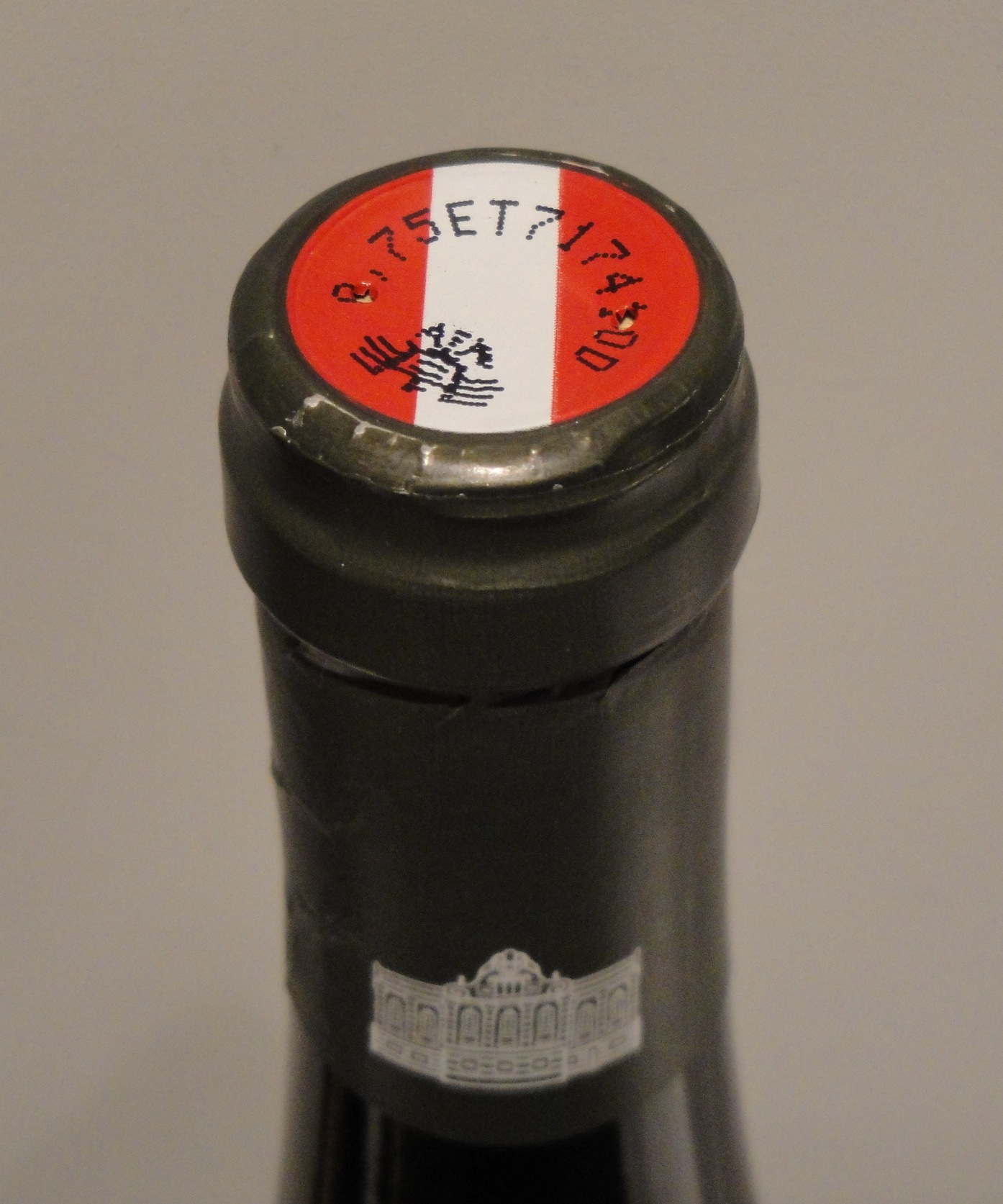
The Austrian wine seal is used on all wines at Qualitätswein level

Austrian wines are mostly dry white wines (often made from the Grüner Veltliner grape), though some sweeter white wines (such as dessert wines made around the Neusiedler See) are also produced. About 30% of the wines are red, made from Blaufränkisch (also known as Lemberger, or as Kékfrankos in neighbouring Hungary), Pinot noir and locally bred varieties such as Zweigelt. Four thousand years of winemaking history counted for little after the "antifreeze scandal" of 1985, when it was revealed that some wine brokers had been adulterating their wines with diethylene glycol. The scandal destroyed the market for Austrian wine and compelled Austria to tackle low standards of bulk wine production, and reposition itself as a producer of quality wines. The country is also home to Riedel, makers of some of the most expensive wine glasses in the world. Some of the best producers of Austria include Weingut Bründlmayer, Weingut F.X. Pichler and Weingut Franz Hirtzberger, Weingut Nikolaihof, Weingut Knoll, Weingut Tement, and Weingut Sattlerhof.

== History ==
There is archaeological evidence of grape growing in Traisental 4000 years ago. Grape seeds have been found in urns dating back to 700 BC in Zagersdorf, whilst bronze wine flagons of the Celtic La Tène culture dating to the 5th century BC have been found at Dürrnberg in Salzburg state. Viticulture thrived under the Romans, once Marcus Aurelius Probus (Roman emperor 276–282) had overturned the ban on growing grapes north of the Alps. Both Grüner Veltliner and Welschriesling appear to have been grown around the Danube since Roman times.

Viticulture suffered with the invasions of Bavarians, Slavs and Avars after the fall of the Roman Empire, but from 788 the rule of Charlemagne saw considerable reconstruction of vineyards and introduction of new grape presses. Once Otto the Great had seen off the threat from Magyar incursions in 955, Austrian viticulture was nurtured by the Church and encouraged among the populace at large. The first vineyard names recorded are Kremser Sandgrube in 1208, and Steiner Pfaffenberg in 1230. Rudolf IV introduced the first wine tax, Ungeld, in 1359, as Vienna established itself as a centre for wine trading on the Danube.

The wine business boomed in the 16th century, but the Thirty Years War and others of the 17th century took their toll, as much due to the heavy taxation of the period as the direct disruption of war. Various drink taxes were unified in 1780, as part of a drive by Maria Theresa and Joseph II to encourage viticulture. An imperial decree of 17 August 1784 gave birth to the distinctive Austrian tradition of inns called Heurigen. Derived from the German for "new wine", the decree allowed all winemakers to sell home-grown food with their wine all year round. Fir trees hung above the door alerted customers to the arrival of the new season's wine. The 19th century saw the arrival of all sorts of biological invaders. First there was powdery mildew (Uncinula necator) and downy mildew (Peronospora). One response to these fungal diseases from North America was the founding in 1860 of what became the Federal Institute for Viticulture and Pomology at Klosterneuburg. Then the phylloxera root aphid arrived in 1872 and wiped out most of the vineyards of central Europe. Although it took several decades for the industry to recover, it allowed lower quality grapes to be replaced with better varieties, particularly Grüner Veltliner. After World War I, Austria was the third biggest wine producer in the world, much being exported in bulk for blending with wine from Germany and other countries.

During the twentieth century, Austrian wine became a high-volume, industrialised business, with much of it being sold in bulk to Germany. A run of favourable years in the early 1980s saw massive yields of wines that were light, dilute and acidic, which were not in high demand. However, sellers came up with a means by which to alter that wine to sell it.

The 1985 Austrian diethylene glycol wine scandal (German: Glykolwein-Skandal) was an incident in which several Austrian wineries illegally adulterated their wines using the toxic substance diethylene glycol (a minor ingredient in some brands of antifreeze) to make the wines taste sweeter and more full-bodied in the style of late harvest wines. Many of these Austrian wines were exported to West Germany, some of them in bulk to be bottled at large-scale West German bottling facilities. At these facilities, some Austrian wines were illegally blended into German wines by the importers, resulting in diethylene glycol ending up in some bulk-bottled West German wines.

The scandal was uncovered by wine laboratories performing quality controls on wines sold in West Germany and immediately made headlines worldwide. The affected wines were immediately withdrawn from the market. Many involved in the scandal were sentenced to prison or heavy fines in Austria and West Germany.

The short-term effect of the scandal was a complete collapse of Austrian wine exports and a total loss of reputation of the entire Austrian wine industry, with a significant adverse impact on the reputation of German wines. The long-term effect was that the Austrian wine industry focused their production on other wine types than previously, primarily dry white wines instead of sweet wines, and increasingly targeted a higher market segment. Still, it took the Austrian wine industry over a decade to recover. Austria also enacted much stricter wine laws.

== Grape varieties ==
Grape	hectare	% of total area
Grüner Veltliner	14,296.41	32.34%
Zweigelt	5,940.28	13.44%
Welschriesling	2,774.27	6.28%
Blaufränkisch	2,550.08	5.77%
Riesling	2,025.05	4.58%
Chardonnay (Morillon)	1,926.66	4.36%
Weißer Burgunder (Pinot Blanc)	1,847.63	4.18%
Sauvignon Blanc	1,739.69	3.94%
Muskateller	1,543.43	3.49%
Müller-Thurgau (Rivaner)	1,195.26	2.70%
Merlot	816.15	1.85%
Blauer Burgunder (Pinot Noir)	602.74	1.36%
St, Laurent	587.75	1.33%
Cabernet Sauvignon	568.66	1.29%
Blauer Wildbacher	520.10	1.18%
other white varieties	3,498.14	7.91%
other red varieties	1,778.09	4.02%
Total area under vine	44,210.39	100%

As can be seen from the table, Grüner Veltliner is the dominant white grape in Austria, producing generally dry wines ranging from short-lived Heuriger wines to Spätleses capable of long life. The ancient Welschriesling variety is used in the noble rot dessert wines of the Neusiedlersee; it also makes undistinguished dry wines for drinking young, as does Müller-Thurgau (Rivaner). Neuburger was supposedly found as flotsam in the Danube in the 1850s, but is now known to be a cross between Silvaner and the ancient Roter Veltliner. Frühroter Veltliner is also known as Malvasier, suggesting a link to the Malvasia grape family of the Eastern Mediterranean. Muscat Ottonel is used in dessert wines from the Neusiedlersee, as is Bouvier, which is related to the muscat family and is a parent of the Orémus (Zéta) grape used in Tokaji. There were high hopes for Goldburger, a cross between Welschriesling and Orangetraube bred in Klosterneuburg, but after an initial wave of planting, enthusiasm has dimmed. Zierfandler (Spätrot) and Rotgipfler are local grapes of the Thermenregion, and traditionally used to be blended together as Spätrot-Rotgipfler. It is worth noting that Pinot gris is known as Ruländer in Austria, and sometimes as Grauburgunder; Pinot blanc is known as Weißburgunder or Weissburgunder. Riesling plays a much smaller role than in Germany, but the relatively small amount grown is used for some of Austria's most appreciated dry white wines.

Zweigelt (sometimes called Blauer Zweigelt, a Blaufränkisch × St. Laurent cross) and Blauburger (Blaufränkisch × Blauer Portugieser) were bred at Klosterneuburg in the 1920s and now account for nearly half of Austria's red wine. The former can be made into powerful wines for ageing, the latter is easier to grow and is generally blended; both are also made into a lighter style for drinking young.

Blaufränkisch and Blauer Portugieser are the traditional red grapes of the region, being part of the blend of Hungary's Egri Bikavér. The former is the more "serious" variety, Blauer Portugieser produces fresh, fruity red wines for drinking young. Sankt Laurent came from France in the mid-19th century, and seems to have substantial Pinot noir (Blauerburgunder) parentage; St Laurent has a reputation for being problematic to grow, but can produce good quality wine. Blauer Wildbacher is probably an indigenous wild grape variety, used to make a cult rosé called Schilcher in western Styria. Roesler and other fungus-resistant varieties are the latest varieties to be bred at Klosterneuburg.

== Classification ==
Since joining the EU the Austrians have made real efforts to improve matters. At present there is the legal systems based on the Romanic scheme, including the regulations for regionally typical wines (DAC) alongside private systems like in the Wachau.

=== National Classification ===
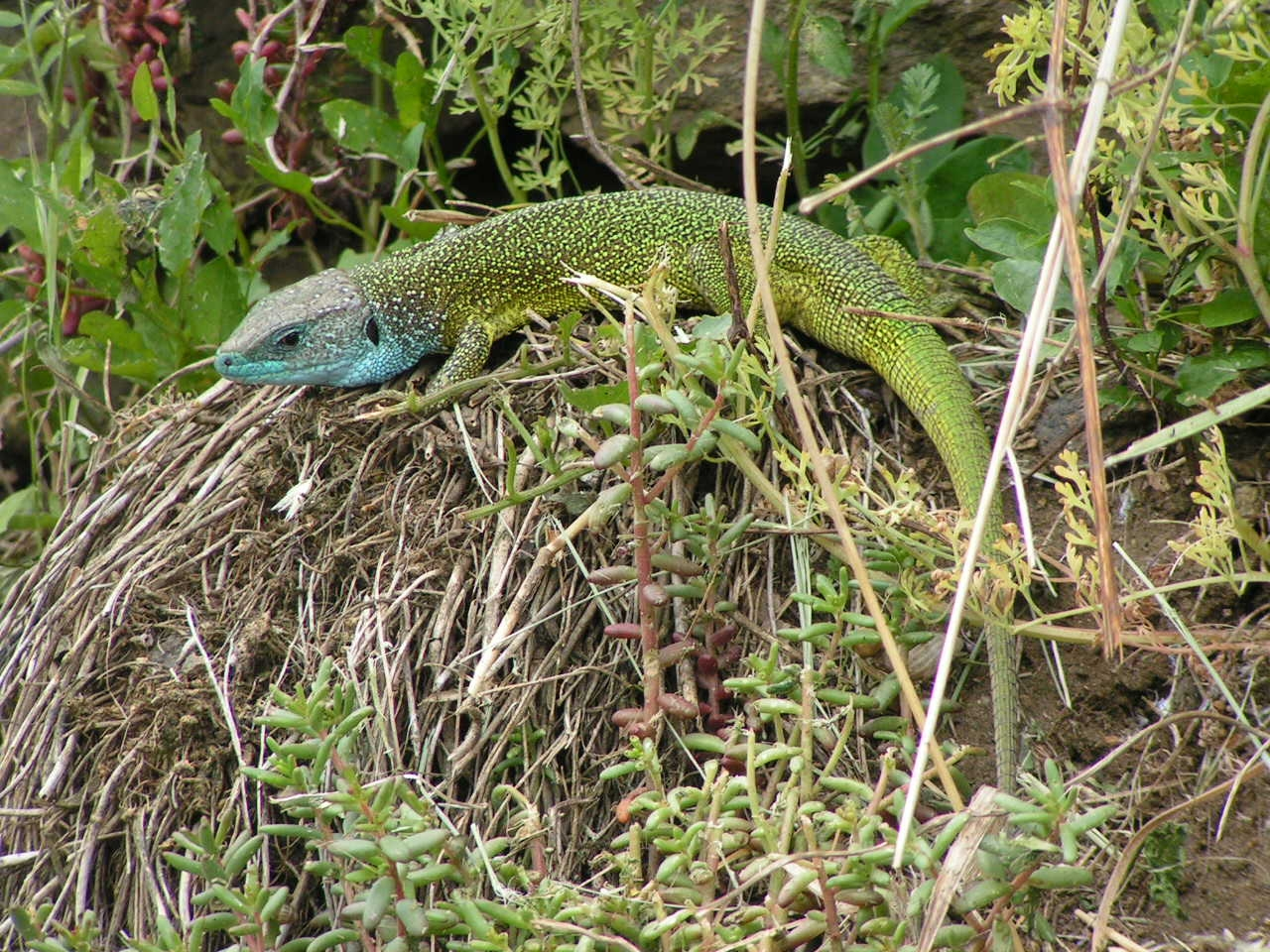
The Smaragd (emerald) Lizard, Lacerta viridis, which gives its name to the highest level of the Wachau wine classification.

After the wine scandal of 1985, Austria basically switched from the Germanic system (classification based on the Klosterneuburger Mostwaage (KMW), which measures the sugar content of the grapes at harvest in a way similar to the Öchsle scale, where 1°KMW is ~5°Oe) to the Romanic system, based on appellations and regional typicity.

==== Wine without geographical indication ====
- Wein

The term Tafelwein has been replaced by the term Wein in 2009.

- without indication of variety or vintage
- withoud yield limit
- blend of wines from different EU countries permitted

Designation:

- Wine from Austria

Wine without PGI or PDO may carry the indication of variety or vintage under certain conditions.

- maximum yield of 10.000 kg (oder 7.500 l wine) per hectare
- Must be free of defects in appearance and taste.
- Appropriate grape variety typicality
- Grape varieties with names of origin (e.g. Weißburgunder and all other Pinot varieties, Rheinriesling etc.) are not permitted (possible misleading of the consumer).
- Specifications of varieties according to the Qualitätswein Grape Varieties Ordinance, as well as grape varieties approved by ordinance.

Increase in alcohol/enrichment of wines without geographical indication

- Increase in alcohol/enrichment maximum enrichment range 2.0% vol
- Total alcohol after enrichment white wine 12.0% vol, red wine 12.5% vol

==== Wines with protected geographical indication (PGI) ====
- Landwein (min. 14 °KMW = 68 °Oe, min. 8,5 %vol)

- Grapes must come 100% from a wine-growing area (Weinland, Steirerland, Bergland).
- "Landwein" must be on the label.
- Must be made exclusively from Qualitätswein grape varieties.
- Minimum must weight of grapes 14°KMW.
- The wine must have the typical characteristics of the designation.
- Total acidity of at least 4 g per litre
- Maximum yield per hectare 10,000 kg (or 7,500 l of wine)
- Must be free of defects in appearance and smell.

Alcohol increase/enrichment

- Alcohol increase/enrichment maximum enrichment range 2.0% vol
- Total alcohol after enrichment white wine 13.5% vol, red wine 14.5% vol

==== Wine with a protected designation of origin (PDO) ====
- In the sense of the GMO wine, Qualitätswein (quality wines), including Prädikatswein and DAC wines, are wines with a protected designation of origin.
- For all Qualitätswein a maximum yield per hectare of 10,000 kg (or 7,500 l of wine) applies.
- All Qualitätswein may only be placed on the market after they have been tested by the state and the state test number has been issued.

Qualitätsweine

- Qualitätswein (min. 15 °KMW = 73° Oe, min. 9 %vol)

- Alcohol increase/enrichment maximum enrichment range 2.0% vol
- Total alcohol after enrichment white wine 13.5% vol, red wine 14.5% vol
- Sweetening up to a content of 15 g of unfermented sugar possible

- Kabinett (mind. 17 °KMW = 83,5° Oe, max. 12,9 %vol)

- No alcohol increase/enrichment
- Residual sugar content maximum 9 g/l
- No sweetening

- Prädikatsweine

- Spätlese (min. 19 °KMW = 94 °Oe, min. 5 %vol)
- Auslese (min. 21 °KMW = 105 °Oe)
- Eiswein (min. 25 °KMW = 127 °Oe)
- Strohwein or Schilfwein (min. 25 °KMW = 127 °Oe)
- Beerenauslese (min. 25 °KMW = 127 °Oe)
- Trockenbeerenauslese (min. 30 °KMW = 156 °Oe)
- Ruster Ausbruch DAC (min. 30 °KMW = 156 °Oe, Trockenbeerenauslese from the town of Rust)

Increasing the alcohol content/enrichment, sweetening of quality wines is not permitted

Information on the bottle:

- red-white-red banderole (= symbol for Qualitätswein bottled domestically)
- state inspection number
- wine-growing region (4 federal states, 18 DAC appellations)
- grape variety, vintage, quality level

=== Districtus Austriae Controllatus (DAC) ===
Districtus Austriae Controllatus, Latin for "Controlled District of Austria", is the Austrian appellation system, similar to the French AOC or the Italian DOCG. Regional wine committees award the DAC to wines typical of their region. There are now 18 DACs:

- Weinviertel DAC (from vintage 2002, Reserve: from vintage 2009)
- Mittelburgenland DAC (from vintage 2005)
- Traisental DAC (from vintage 2006)
- Kremstal DAC (from vintage 2007)
- Kamptal DAC (from vintage 2008)
- Leithaberg DAC (white: from vintage 2009, red: from vintage 2008)
- Eisenberg DAC (from vintage 2009)
- Neusiedlersee DAC (Klassik: from vintage 2011, Reserve: from vintage 2010, sweet: from vintage 2020)
- Wiener Gemischter Satz DAC (from vintage 2013)
- Rosalia DAC (from vintage 2017)
- Vulkanland Steiermark DAC (from vintage 2018)
- Südsteiermark DAC (from vintage 2018)
- Weststeiermark DAC (from vintage 2018)
- Carnuntum DAC (from vintage 2019)
- Wachau DAC (from vintage 2020)
- Ruster Ausbruch DAC (from vintage 2020)
- Wagram DAC (from vintage 2021)
- Thermenregion DAC (from vintage 2023)

=== Wachau Classification ===
The "Vinea Wachau Nobilis Districtus" has three categories, all for dry wines:

- Steinfeder ("Stone feather"—named after a grass, Stipa pennata, that grows in the vineyards): maximum 11.5% alcohol, mostly for local quaffing.
- Federspiel (named after a falconry device): 11.5% to 12.5% alcohol and a minimum must weight of 17° KMW, roughly equivalent to Kabinett.
- Smaragd (named after an 'emerald' lizard that lives in the vineyards): minimum 12.5% alcohol, with a maximum 9 g/litre residual sugar; some of the best dry whites in Austria.

== Wine regions ==
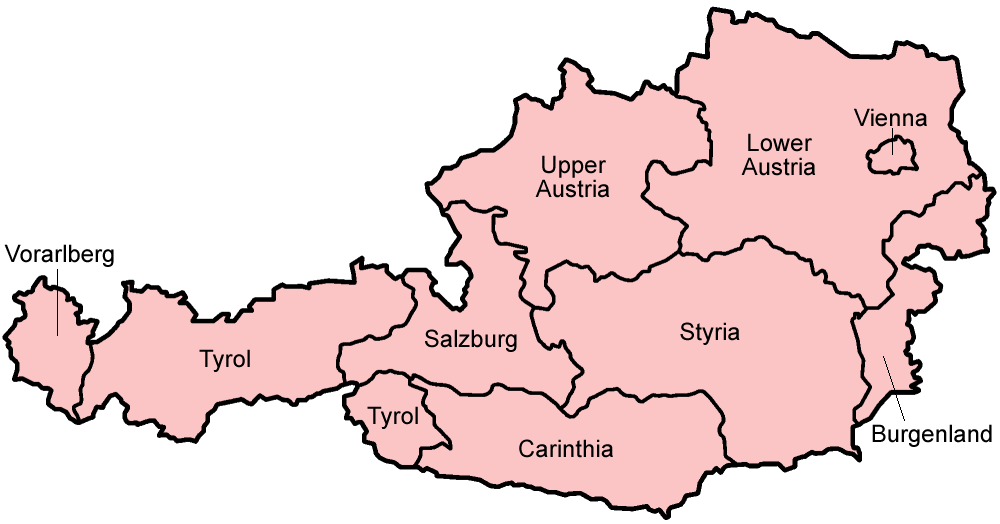
Austrian regions

In 2024 Austria had 44,210 hectares of vineyard, almost all of it in the east of the country. Of these 26,723 ha are in the state of Niederösterreich (Lower Austria) and 11,538 ha in Burgenland and 588 ha in Wien (Vienna) which together make up the wine-growing area Weinland. Steiermark (Styria) accounts for 5,109 ha, and there are 243 ha in the rest of Austria, known as the wine-growing area Bergland. The federal states are split into 17 specific wine-growing regions.

=== Lower Austria ===
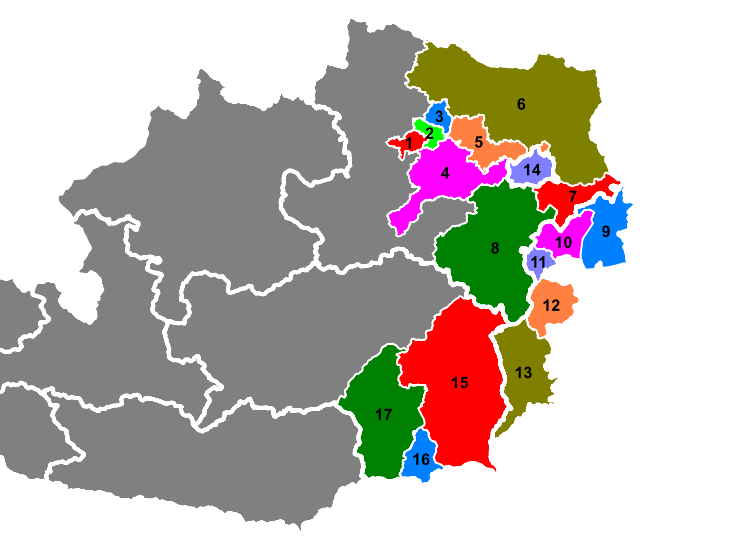
1 Wachau 2 Kremstal 3 Kamptal 4 Traisental 5 Wagram 6 Weinviertel 7 Carnuntum 8 Thermenregion 9 Neusiedlersee 10 Leithaberg 11 Rosalia 12 Mittelburgenland 13 Eisenberg 14 Wien 15 Vulkanland Steiermark 16 Südsteiermark 17 Weststeiermark

==== Wachau ====
This narrow valley of the Danube around Melk is reminiscent of the great wine areas of the Rhine, with steep terraces that produce world-class Grüner Veltliner and Riesling wines. Climatically and geologically it marks the transition from the Alps to the Hungarian plains, leading to a diverse array of microclimates and terroir, with the river moderating the effects of the cold Alpine winds. As mentioned above, the Vinea Wachau Nobilis Districtus still clings to its own classification of Steinfeder, Federspiel and Smaragd, reserved for wines that are made 100% from Wachau grapes.

==== Kremstal ====
Downstream of the Wachau lies the Kremstal region, centred on the town of Krems. The valley opens out a little, the climate is a little warmer allowing more red wine to be produced, but otherwise Kremstal is quite similar to the Wachau.

==== Kamptal ====
To the north of Krems lies Langenlois, which is the main town of Kamptal, the valley of the river Kamp. The sandstone slopes are so steep that only a thin layer of soil is retained, and exposure to the sun is high. Riesling thrives on these steep slopes; closer to the Danube the valley broadens and more red grapes are grown.

==== Traisental ====
To the south of Krems lies Herzogenburg, at the centre of Traisental, which was only designated as a wine district in 1995. Mostly Grüner Veltliner is grown here, which is made into a fresh style for drinking young.

==== Wagram ====
Between Krems and Vienna lies the Wagram, which covers two very different areas. North of the Danube is the plateau of Wagram, where the Grüner Veltliner is a bit more full-bodied and aromatic, and Roter Veltliner is something of a local speciality. Blauer Zweigelt and Pinot noir wines are also made here, as well as a little Eiswein.

Further downstream, just outside Vienna lies Klosterneuburg. As the biggest private wine estate in the country, the abbey has played a formative role in Austrian wine for the last 900 years. The Federal Institute for Viticulture and Pomology was the world's first college of viticulture and continues to play an important part in the development of wine in Austria.

==== Weinviertel ====
The Weinviertel lies in the northeast corner of Austria, between the Danube and the Czech and Slovak borders. The biggest single wine region in Austria is home to half the Grüner Veltliner in the country (subject of the first DAC), and considerable amounts of Welschriesling, but most of Austria's varieties can be found here. Even sparkling wine is made from Riesling and Grüner Veltliner in the far northeast around Poysdorf.

==== Carnuntum ====
The deep soils between Vienna and the Neusiedlersee have established a reputation for well-balanced red wines made from Zweigelt and Blaufränkisch. Being close to Vienna and full of history, the area is a popular area to visit.

==== Thermenregion ====
The spa region south of Vienna saw two wine regions, Gumpoldskirchen and Bad Vöslau, merged in 1985. Climatically similar to Burgundy, with a wide variation in soils, all kinds of grape varieties are made here, many being made into elegant wines. Perhaps the most interesting wines are local varieties Zierfandler (Spätrot) and Rotgipfler, both of which are white grapes despite their names, and the red St. Laurent variety.

=== Burgenland ===
==== Neusiedlersee ====
The east side of the Neusiedler See is home to fruity, fresh Zweigelt wines and rare sweet wines. The shallow Neusiedler See (Lake Neusiedl) is one of the few places on earth where noble rot attacks grapes reliably every year. This means that botrytised dessert wines can be made more easily, and hence sold more cheaply, than in other areas famous for this style of wine. Increasingly, red wine is also being made in this region.

==== Leithaberg ====
The "hill country" to the west of Lake Neusiedl offers a diversity of terrain that is reflected in the number of grape varieties and styles of wine made here. Perhaps the most famous is the Ruster Ausbruch dessert wine from the western shore of the lake.

==== Mittelburgenland ====
The Mittelburgenland is a southern continuation of the forested hills to the west of the Neusiedlersee. The nickname "Blaufränkischland" reflects the dominant variety here, which is the subject of the red wine DAC and can be very good, the Bordeaux varieties also do well here.

==== Eisenberg ====
The most famous wine-growing region of the South Burgenland, Eisenberg, reflects the red, iron-rich soil which imparts a distinct spiciness to the Blaufränkisch grown here. A speciality here is Uhudler wine, made from hybrids with North American species such as Isabella, Concord, Delaware, Noah, Elvira and Ripadella, which was banned for a while after the 1985 scandal.

=== Vienna ===
There are 588 ha of vineyards within the city limits of the Austrian capital. Vines were grown within the city walls of Vienna in the Middle Ages, although they have now been pushed into the outskirts. Riesling, Chardonnay and Pinot blanc are grown on the limestone soils towards Klosterneuburg, whereas red grapes do better on the rich soil to the south of the city. Field blends known as Gemischter Satz are common here, and most wine is drunk young in the city's heurigen wine taverns.

=== Styria ===
Under a 2002 amendment to the wine laws, Steirerland (the modern Austrian state) replaced Steiermark as the name for Styria on wine. Steiermark encompasses the accumulated area of the three specific wine-growing regions.

==== Vulkanland Steiermark ====
The many extinct volcanoes east of Graz give a rich soil which imparts a spiciness to the variety of grapes grown in Southeast Styria. The climate is a little cooler here, especially at night, giving a long growing season resulting in wines that are crisp, aromatic and full bodied.

1,657 hectares of vineyards are cultivated—all located around Klöch, Sankt Anna am Aigen and Straden and situated primarily on the slopes of the extinct volcanoes which characterize the landscape. Some vineyards are up to 650 m above sea level.

The main grape varieties grown in this region are Welschriesling, Chardonnay (called Morillon), Weißburgunder (Pinot blanc) and Grauburgunder (Pinot gris), Gelber Muskateller, the Traminer family, Sauvignon blanc and Riesling; red wines feature Zweigelt as well as other grapes, including St. Laurent or Blauburgunder (Pinot noir).

==== Südsteiermark ====
Südsteiermark (South Styria), near the Slovenian border, is mainly Sauvignon blanc country—however, the 2,798 hectares of vineyards also include Welschriesling, Morillon (Chardonnay), Muskateller and Traminer.

Soil types include sandstone, shale, clay and shelly limestone. The combination of warm days and cool nights gives a long growing season, resulting in crisp, aromatic and full-bodied wines.

The warm humid climate and steep hills make this one of the toughest places in Austria to be a vigneron.

==== Weststeiermark ====
Southwest of Graz lie ancient vineyards which mainly produce a cult rosé called Schilcher. Made from the indigenous Blauer Wildbacher grape, Schilcher is a true terroir rosé.

== See also ==
- 1985 diethylene glycol wine scandal
- Old World wine
- Slovenian wine
- Winemaking
- Agriculture in Austria
