= Silvaner =

Variety of grape

- Grape (Vitis)
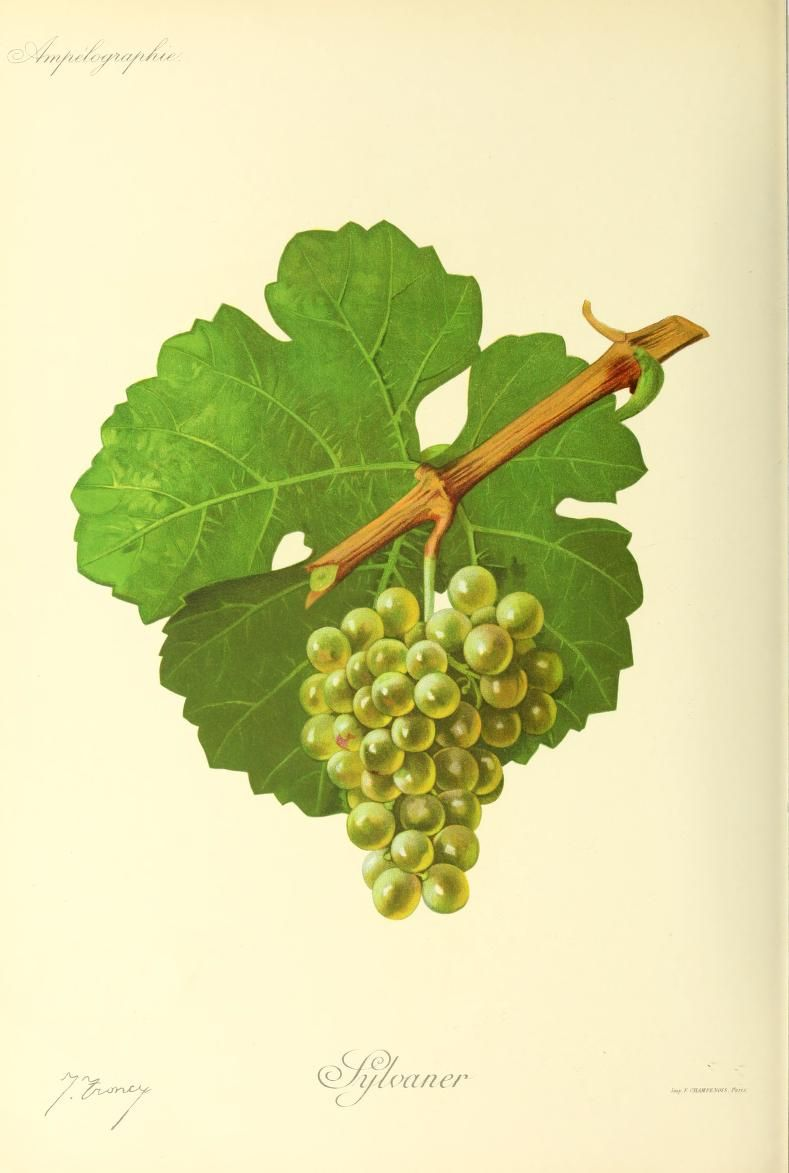
- Silvaner in Viala & Vermorel
- Color of berry skin: Blanc
- Species: Vitis vinifera
- Also called: Sylvaner, Gros-Rhin, Grüner Silvaner, Johannisberger, Sylvaner verde (more)
- Origin: Central Europe, possibly Austria
- Notable regions: Alsace, Austria, Franconia, other regions of Germany
- VIVC number: 11805

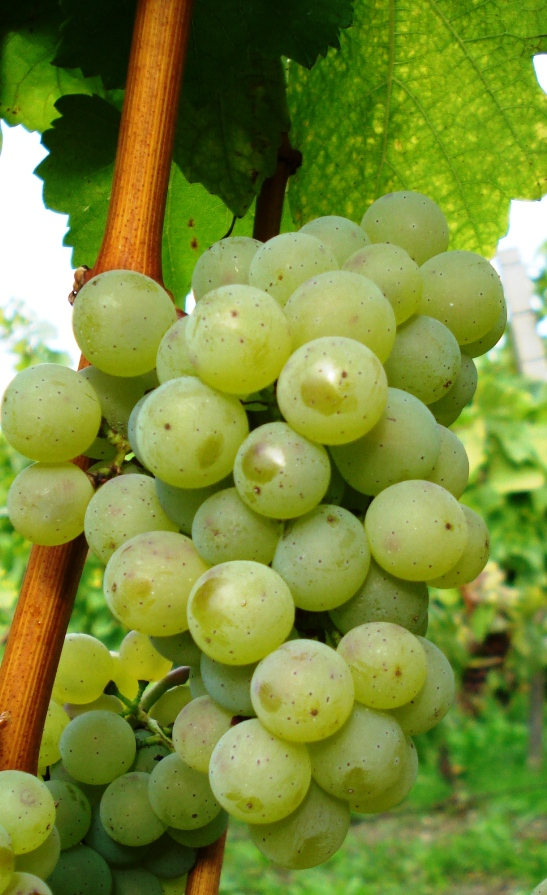
Silvaner growing in Franconia

Silvaner or Sylvaner (German: [zɪlˈvaːnɐ]) is a variety of white wine grape grown primarily in Alsace and Germany, where its official name is Grüner Silvaner. While the Alsatian versions have primarily been considered simpler wines, it was included among the varieties that can be used to produce Alsace Grand Cru wine in 2006, together with the four 'noble grapes' of Alsace, although only in one vineyard, Zotzenberg.

This dichotomy is explained by the vigour of the Sylvaner vine and the grape's neutral flavour, which can lead to blandness unless yields are controlled. On the other hand, it gives a blank canvas for the expression of terroir, and on good sites with skilled winemaking, Sylvaner can produce elegant wines. It has high acidity but naturally reaches high must weights, so is often blended with other varieties such as Riesling or Elbling, and is sometimes made into a dessert wine.

== History ==
Sylvaner is an ancient variety that has long been grown in Central Europe. In Germany it is best known as a component of Liebfraumilch. It has long enjoyed a better reputation in Franconia than in other German wine regions. DNA fingerprinting has revealed it to be a cross between Traminer and the "hunnic" variety Österreichisch-Weiß (meaning "Austrian White"). As a result, it is now thought to have originated in Austrian Empire.

It is thought that the grape came to Germany after the Thirty Years' War as there is a record of Sylvaner from Austria being planted at County of Castell in Franconia on 5 April 1659. So Germany celebrated the 350th anniversary of Silvaner in 2009. Its name has been taken to be associated with either Latin silva (meaning woods) or saevum (meaning wild), and before modern ampelography it was sometimes assumed that this variety had a close relationship with wild vines. Before DNA typing, some assumed an origin in Transylvania based on its name.

Sylvaner was planted widely in Germany and Alsace after the Second World War, reaching 30% and 25% respectively of total vineyard area in the 1960s - 1970s. It was Germany's most grown variety until it was overtaken by Müller-Thurgau around 1970. Much of the German crop was blended into Liebfraumilch, but overproduction of this type of wine ruined its reputation, and changing tastes led to many vines being grubbed up. Liebfraumilch became popular again with new wine drinkers and again changing tastes. However, in Franconia, where Liebfraumilch may not be produced and which primarily stuck to dry white wines in the decades when most other German regions produced semi-sweet wines, Silvaner has kept its popularity. Single-variety semi-sweet Silvaner, which used to be common, has all but disappeared from the German wine production. More recently there has been a revival in Alsace based on low yields from good vineyard sites, with formal recognition in 2006 as Zotzenburg Sylvaner became the first to be designated an Alsace Grand Cru.

Sylvaner is the wine chosen by the protagonist of Julio Cortázar's novel 62 Modelo para armar on the firsts pages, when entering the Parisian restaurant Polidor “Why did I ask for a bottle of Sylvaner?”.

== Distribution and wines ==
=== Australia ===
In the 1970s Brown Brothers experimented with "Syilvaner" in northeastern Victoria, but nothing seems to have come of it.

=== Austria ===
There are just 34 hectares (84 acres) of Sylvaner in its land of origin, due to the trend in Austrian wine towards drier styles.

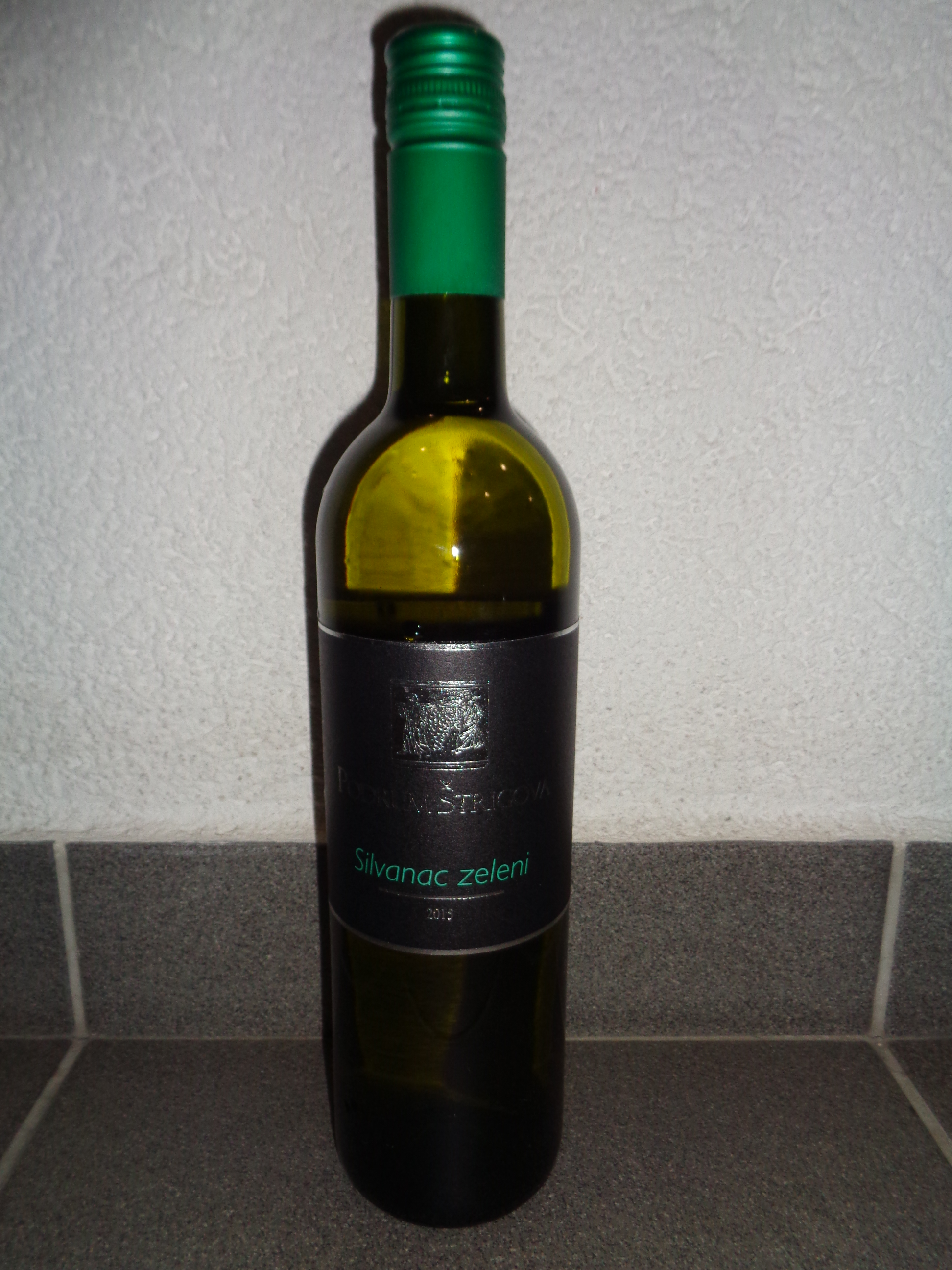
A bottle of Green silvaner from Međimurje County

=== Croatia ===
Sylvaner (silvanac zeleni in Croatian) is grown in Eastern Croatia, in the regions of Slavonija and Srijem, as well as in other regions. In recent years high-quality semi-dry Silvanac zeleni from Orahovica has become one of Croatia's more popular whites.

=== France ===
Sylvaner has a controversial place in Alsace wine. Since 2006, it may be used in Alsace Grand Cru, which was previously reserved for the four "noble grapes" Gewürztraminer, Muscat, Pinot gris and Riesling, but only in the Zotzenberg vineyard, which together with Altenberg de Bergheim and Kaefferkopf were allowed to produce mixed variety wines as Alsace Grand Cru. Zotzenberg Grand Cru wines may consist of Gewürztraminer, Pinot gris, Riesling and Sylvaner in any combination. It is therefore possible to produce a varietally pure "Sylvaner Grand Cru" from this vineyard, but it may not be labelled so, only "Zotzenberg". Even after this, Jean Trimbach's view was that "This Sylvaner grand cru is only possible in Zotzenberg, it is a recognition of the terroir, but we should stop there." As in Germany, Sylvaner has been falling in popularity since the 1970s, declining from 25% of Alsace vineyards to 10% in that time.

=== Germany ===
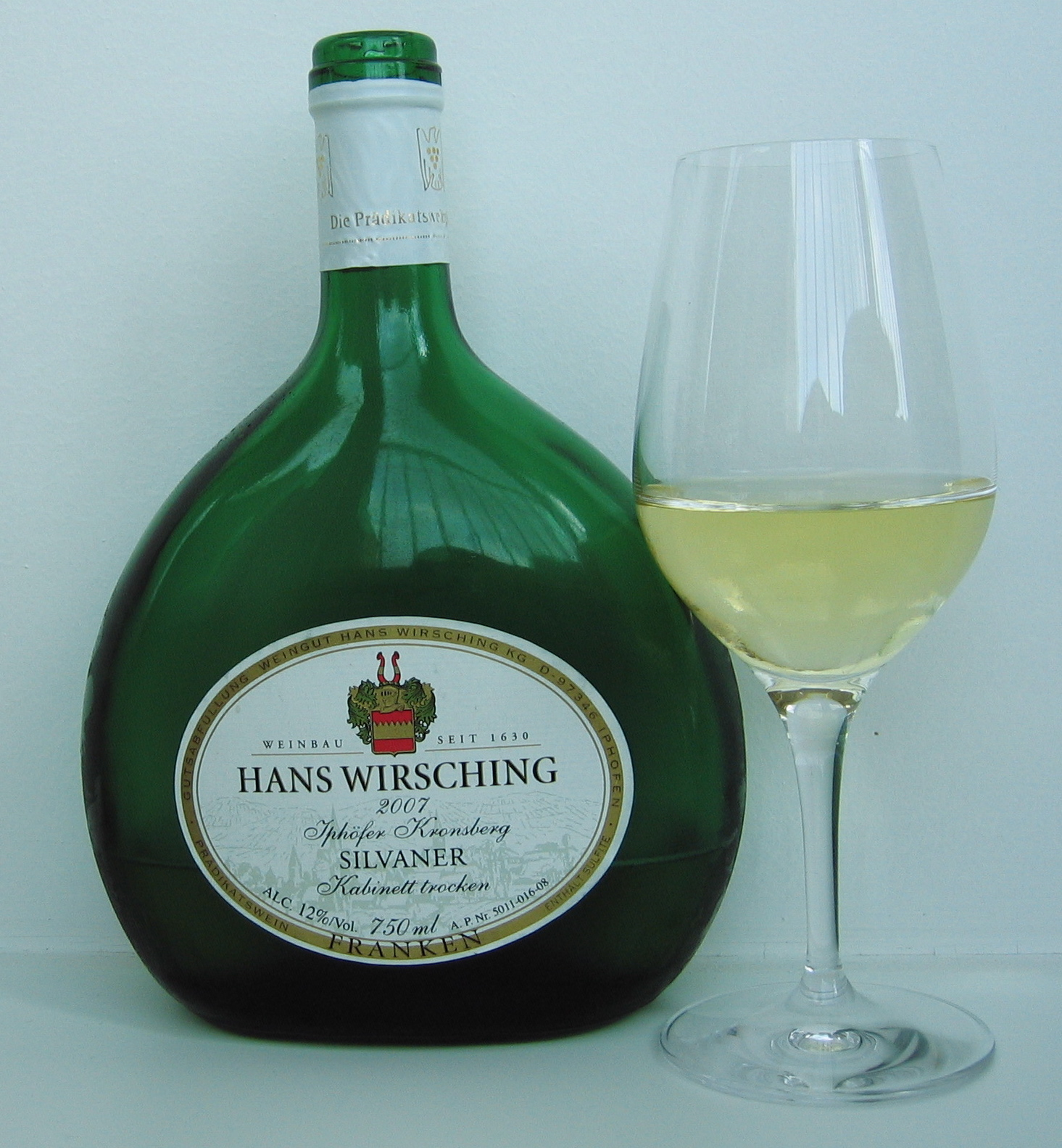
A Silvaner wine from Franconia in the typical Bocksbeutel

First recorded at Castell in 1659, Silvaner (with an 'i') reached a peak in the 1960s-1970s, with 30% of German vineyards. However overproduction during the Liebfraumilch years ruined its reputation, and it has since retreated to its stronghold in Franconia (Frankenland) (1,425 ha), where on the best chalky Muschelkalk terroir it can produce wines that can compete with the best German white wines which usually are made out of the Riesling grape. These powerful wines are considered food-friendly and are often described as having an "earthy" palate. Under VDP Erste Lage/Grosses Gewächs rules, Silvaner may be used for Grosses Gewächs wines (top-end dry wines), but only in Franconia and Saale-Unstrut and not in any of the other 11 German wine regions. Silvaner is also grown in Rheinhessen (2,486 ha) and Palatinate, and is sometimes also made into dessert wine. Currently there are 5,000 hectares (12,000 acres) in Germany, just 5% of the total area under vine.

The official name of the variety in Germany is Grüner Silvaner, spelled with an "i" in difference from Alsace and its homeland of Austria.

The Silvaner is not usually matured in barrique (oak) barrels to avoid the fine and fruity body of the Silvaner being overwhelmed by the oak taste.

=== Romania ===
In Transylvania, presumed to be the homeland of Silvaner, two varieties of this grape are grown: the Sylvaner roz (rosé) and the Sylvaner Verde B (Grüner Silvaner, Silvaner) in wineyards as Jidvei (Tarnava) and Nachbil (Dealurile Sătmarului - Satu Mare)

=== Slovakia ===
Silvaner is traditionally grown in the Limbach village in Slovakia, that is famous for its varietal Silvaner wines, and in its surroundings.

=== Switzerland ===
Some is grown in Switzerland, where it is known as Johannisberger or Sylvaner with an "y".

=== United States ===
In 1858, Emil Dresel brought the first Sylvaner cuttings to America and planted them on what is now the Scribe Estate in Sonoma County. In his honor, Scribe Winery planted one acre in 2007. It has been grown for many years at Rancho Sisquoc Winery in the Santa Maria Valley of California. Otherwise, Sylvaner has more or less disappeared from California, where it was known as Sylvaner Riesling, Franken Riesling, Monterey Riesling, and Sonoma Riesling. Oregon does have some Sylvaner at David Hill Vineyards in Forest Grove.

== Red and Blue Silvaner ==
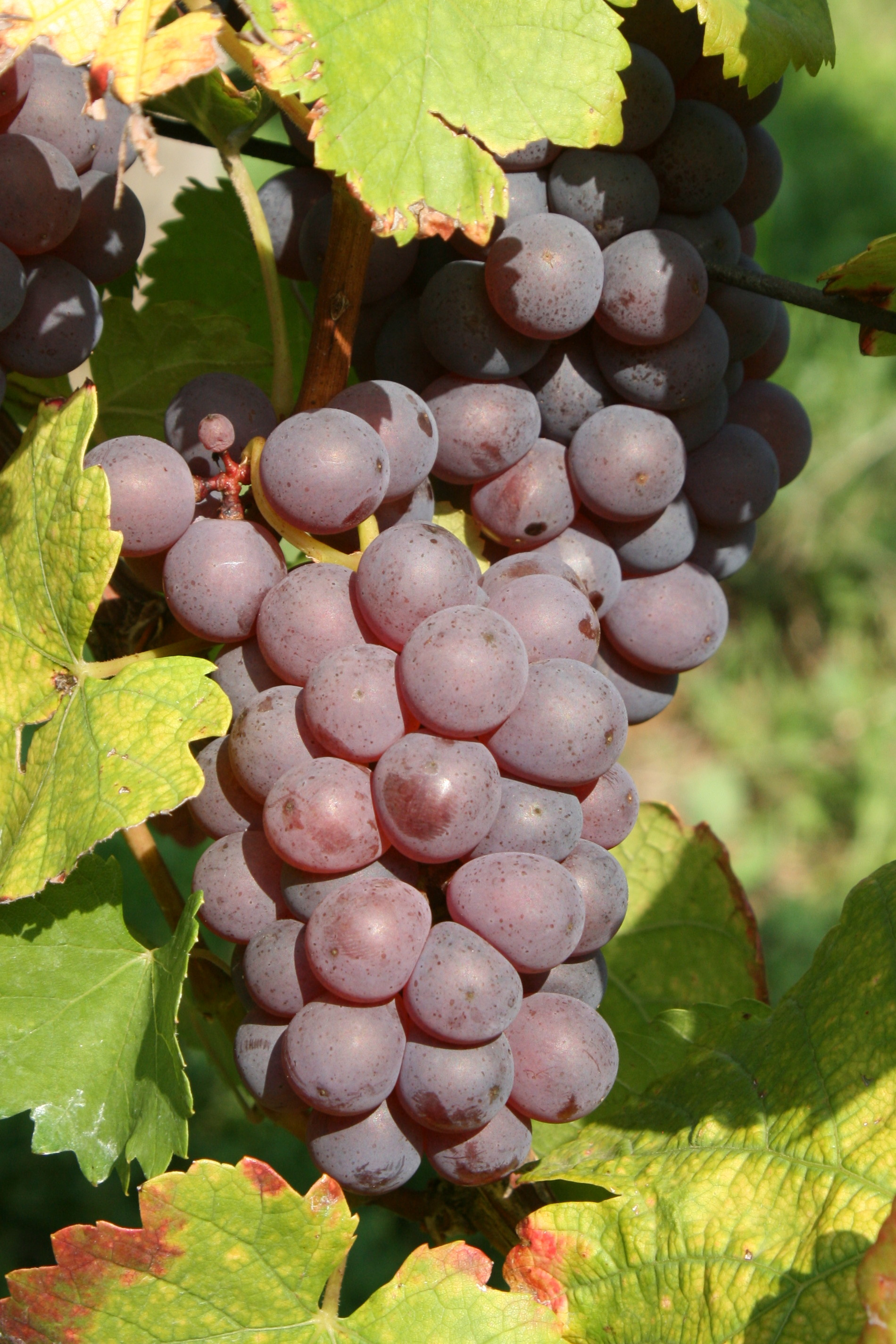
Blue Silvaner

Varieties of Red Silvaner and Blue Silvaner grapes are mutated varieties and are produced in small quantities

The wine areas of Baden-Württemberg are best known for producing red wines, most of which are locally consumed and not well known outside Germany. Adjacent wine region Franken in Bayern (Franconia) has a similar continental type warm dry summer and is often planted with white silvaner grapes with small plantings of red silvaner grapes.

Red silvaner mutates easily, with more than 200 varieties researched. Quality producers put much interest into new clone varieties for eventual replacement of traditional varieties.

Blue silvaner is thought to be a natural cross between red and green silvaner, while red silvaner is thought to originate from natural mutation of green silvaner.

A German red sylvaner wine from 2017 has been rated among the top 6% of wines in the country.

== Vine and viticulture ==
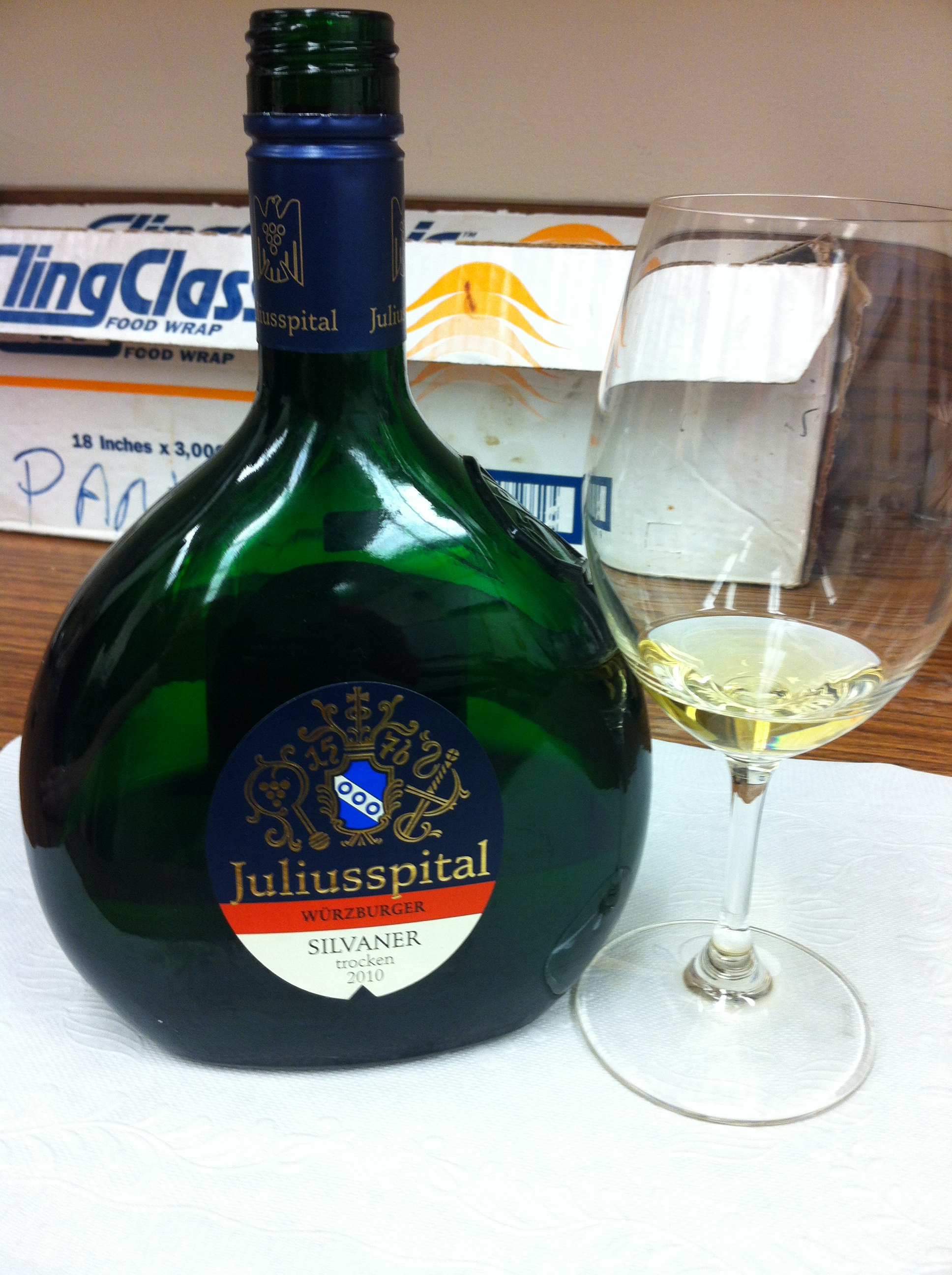
A Silvaner from Franconia

The vine is vigorous and productive, with three-lobed leaves. The bunches are small and cylindrical, with medium green berries that ripen quickly.

In 1940, Silvaner was crossed with Chasselas to produce the white grape variety Nobling.

== Synonyms ==
Silvaner is also known under the following synonyms: Arvine, Arvine Grande, Augustiner Weiss, Beregi Szilvani, Boetzinger, Clozier, Cynifadl Zeleny, Cynifal, Fliegentraube, Frankenriesling, Frankentraube, Fueszeres Szilvani, Gamay blanc, GentilvVert, Gros Rhin, Gros-rhin, Gruen Silvaner, Gruenedel, Gruenfraenkisch, Grün Silvaner, Haeusler Schwarz, Johannisberger, Mishka, Momavaka, Monterey Riesling, Moravka, Movavka, Muschka, Mushza, Musza, Nemetskii Rizling, Oesterreicher, Oestreicher, Pepltraube, Picardon blanc, Picardou blanc, Plant Du Rhin, Rhin, Rundblatt, Salfin, Salfine Bely, Salvaner, Salviner, Scharvaner, Scherwaner, Schoenfeilner, Schwaebler, Schwuebler, Sedmogradka, Sedmogradska Zelena, Selenzhiz, Selivan, Silvánské zelené, Sylván zelený, Sonoma Riesling, Sylvaner, Sylvaner verde, Szilvani Feher, Tschafahnler, Yesil Silvaner, Zelencic, Zeleny, Zirifandel Zierifandel, Zinifal, Zoeld Szilvani, Zoeldsilvani, Syilvaner, Siylvaner, Sylvaner vert, Grüner Sylvaner, Grünfraenkisch, Franken Riesling and Grüner Silvaner.

== See also ==
- German wine
