= Schloss Gobelsburg =

Coordinates: 48.4611°N 15.6961°E

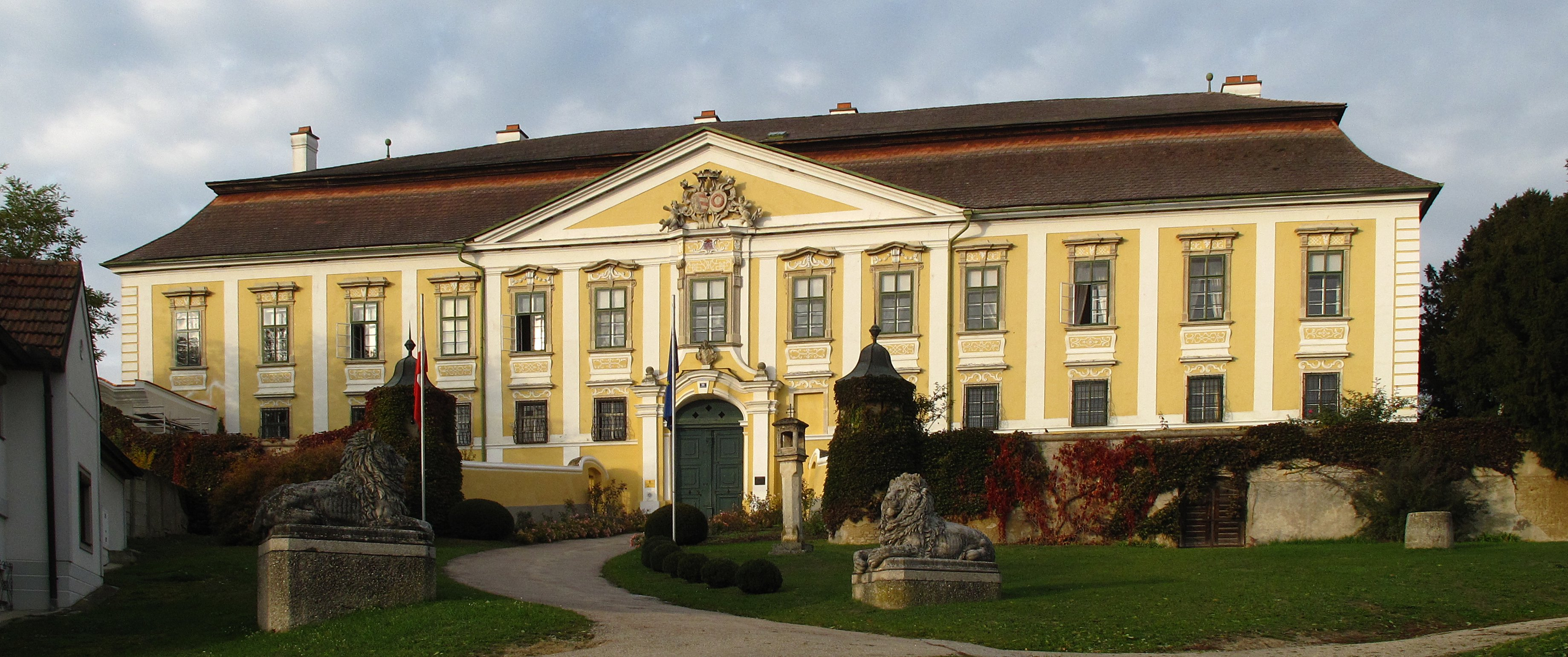
Schloss Gobelsburg

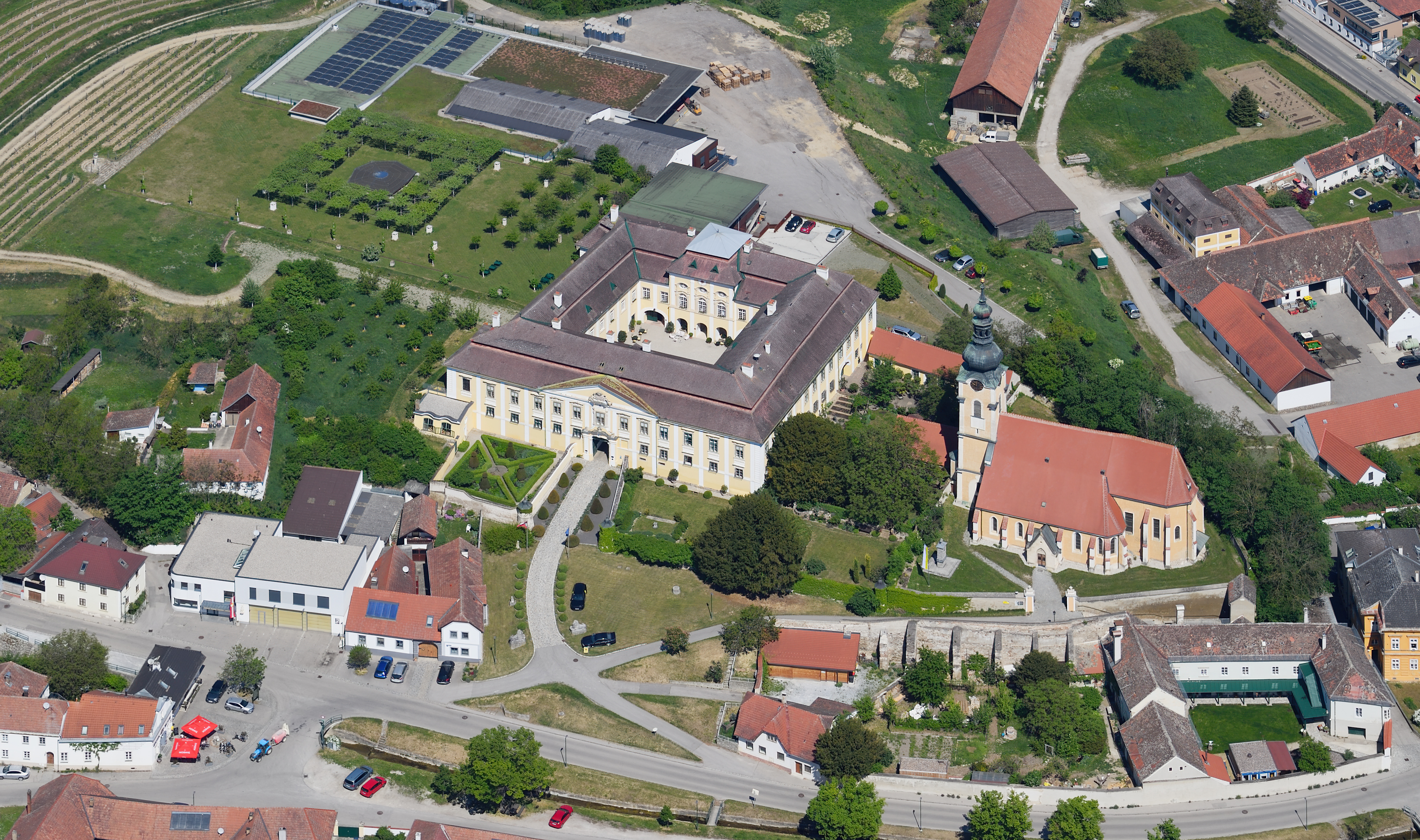
Aerial view of Schloss Gobelsburg

Schloss Gobelsburg is a winery and castle in the Kamptal wine growing region in Lower Austria, some 80 kilometers to the north west of Vienna. The estate produces both red and white wines. Wine production on the estate dates to 1171; it is the oldest winery in the Danube region. The structure is a listed building.

Gobelsburg specializes in Rieslings produced using traditional methods. Karen MacNeil calls the winery "one of the great wine estates of the world."

== History ==
The oldest archaeological finds at the Gobelsburg site date back some 4,000 years. In the 1000s, the Kunringer family first built a fortress at the site. The original structure was built in 1074 by Azzo von Gobatsburg, an early member of the Kuenringer family. A castle of this name is mentioned in 1178. Having belonged to various aristocratic families, castle and grounds were sold to the Cistercian monks of Zwettl Abbey in 1740 and have been in its possession since. It is a listed building.

The Renaissance structure underlying the present face of the castle was renovated in baroque style in 1725 by Josef Munggenast and was described by Food & Wine's Lettie Teague as "easily the grandest winery" of a 2017 tour of Austrian vineyards. The building's chapel houses a work by Kremser Schmidt. In 1740, Zwettl Abbey acquired the Gobelsburg property from Achaz Ehrenreich von Hohenfeld.

Winemaking on the estate dates to the 1100s. Production history dates to 1171. It is the oldest winery in the Danube. Pinot Noir grapes were introduced to the Langenlois by the monks of Stift Zwettl, who brought them from Burgundy.

From the mid-1700s, Gobelsburg Messwein was well-known and well-regarded. After World War II, the Kamptal area was occupied by the Soviet Union, who confiscated for their own use the best vintages of many wineries, including those of Schloss Gobelsburg.

Father Bertrand Baumann managed the estate from 1958 through 1980, but only fully retired in 1995. In 1980 management was taken over by Karl Burger and in 1990 by Andreas Schmid. In 1996 Eva and Michael Moosbrugger took responsibility of the building and the winery.

== Estate ==
Wine production at the castle dates back several centuries. After taking over in 1996, Michael Moosbrugger (who was initially supported by wine producer Willi Bründlmayer) focussed on vineyard work and vinification according to quality standards based on certain monastic principles.

Of the 39 hectares under vines around the Kamptal village of Langenlois, Gobelsburg's premium vineyards are the rocky, terraced Zöbinger Heiligenstein and Grub, mostly for Riesling, as well as the lower-lying Lamm and Gaisberg vineyards, whose sand and loess soils are mainly planted with Grüner Veltliner. The Grüner Veltliner varietal makes up 50% of total production, followed by Riesling (25%), St. Laurent (8%), Zweigelt and Pinot noir (both 6%), and Merlot (5%). Vineyard work is done by hand and mostly follows organic practice, although as of 2022 the vineyard was not certified as organic. A considerable proportion of Gobelsburg wines is exported.

== Winemaking ==
Karen MacNeil calls the winery "one of the great wine estates of the world."

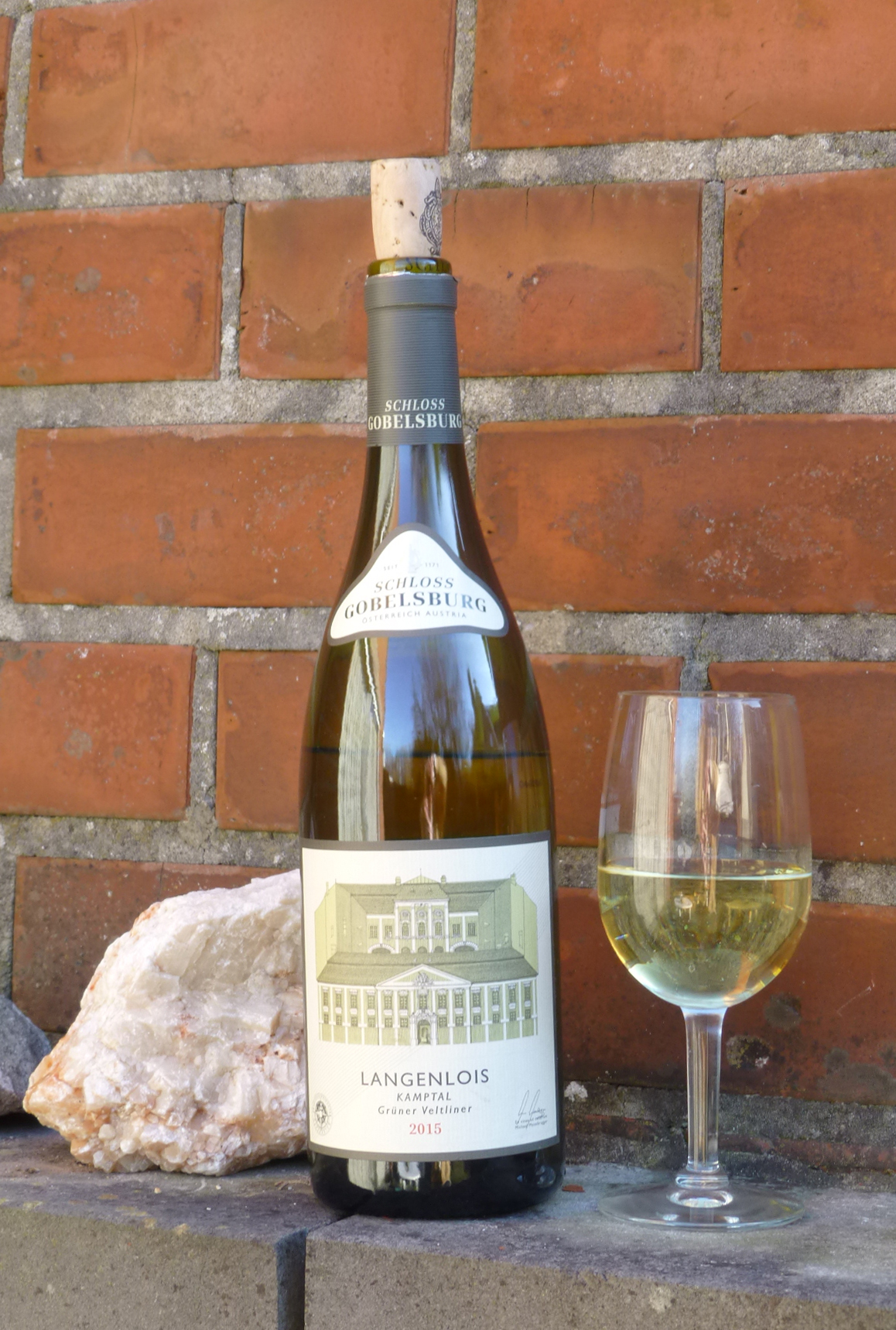
Quality Grüner Veltliner 2015 vintage

Gobelsburg winemaking emphasizes traditional varietals and terroir expression. Oak casks are used sparingly and only for Grüner Velliner and red wines, otherwise large barrels or steel tanks are used for vinification. Mostly natural yeasts are used for fermentation, and yeast contact is preferred for some premium wines. The Tradition line of wines is using methods drawn from historical winemaking practice.

Gobelsburg specializes in Rieslings.

=== Noted wines ===
Wine writer Margaret Rand included Schloss Gobelsburg's Riesling Ried Hieligenstein in her 2018 101 Wines to Try Before You Die. In her 2015 The Wine Bible, Karen MacNeil calls out Schloss Gobelsburg as "one of the top producers in the Kamptal region", specifically noting the Tradition Riesling and the Alte Haide Pinot noir as among "the Lower Austrian Wines to Know".

== See also ==
- Austrian Wine
