= HHW =

HHW may refer to:

- hhw (trigraph), used for the Dene Suline language
- Hahndorf Hill Winery, in South Australia
- Heating hot water, water used for heating
- Highland Hall Waldorf School, in Northridge, California, United States
- Hip Hop Weekly (magazine)
- Household hazardous waste
- Stan Stamper Municipal Airport, in Hugo, Oklahoma, USA
- Harmony Hall West, headquarters of the Barbershop Harmony Society
