= Zwettl Abbey =

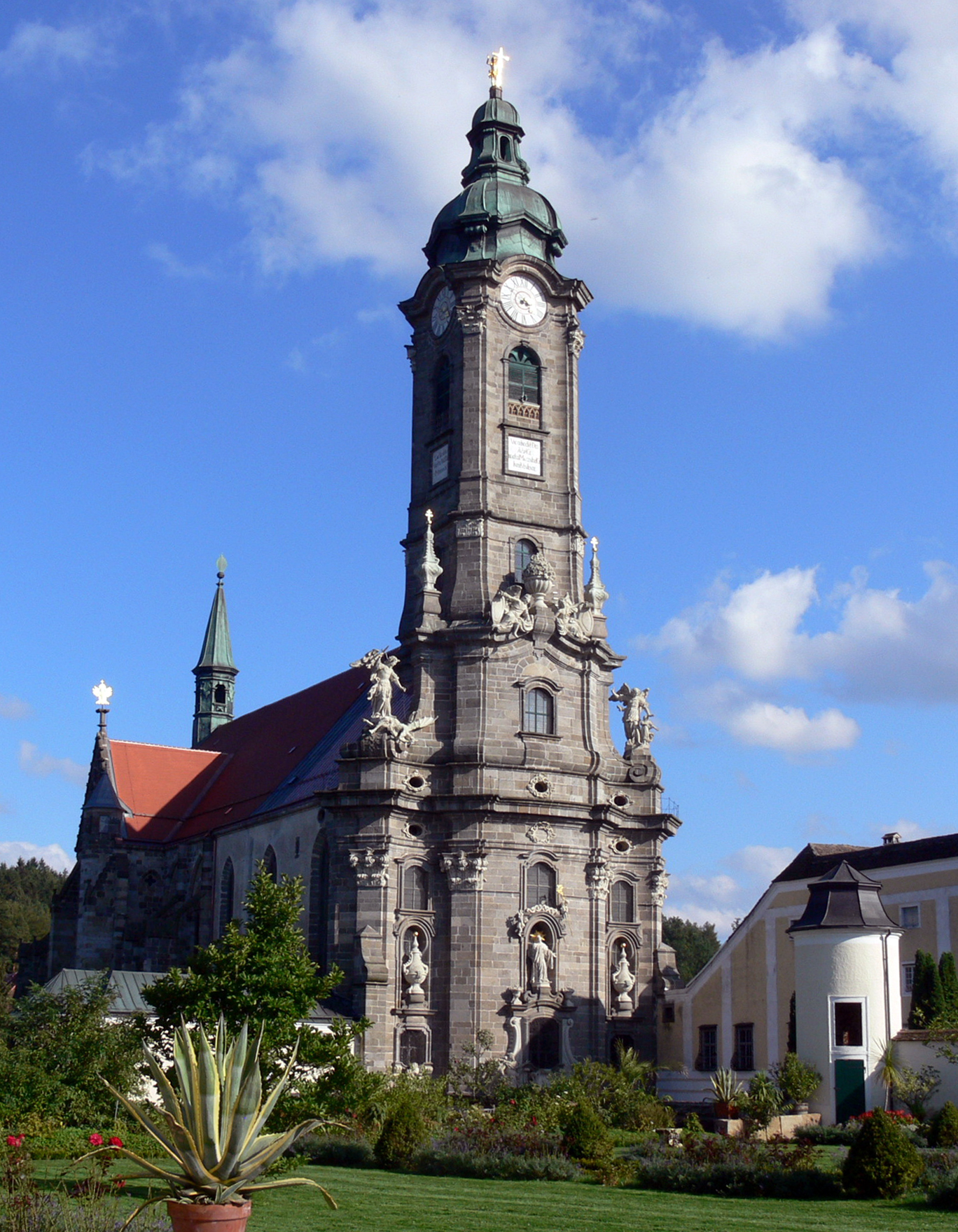
- Zwettl Abbey Church in Zwettl, Austria

- Location within Austria

Religion
- Affiliation: Catholic Church
- Leadership: Wolfgang (Peter) Wiedermann
- Year consecrated: 1138

Location
- Location: Zwettl, Austria
- State: Lower Austria
- Coordinates: 48.616944°N 15.2°E

Architecture
- Style: Romanesque, Baroque
- Founder: Hadmar I of Kuenring
- Completed: 1137

Zwettl Abbey (German: Stift Zwettl) is a Cistercian monastery located in Zwettl in Lower Austria, in the Diocese of St. Pölten.

== History ==
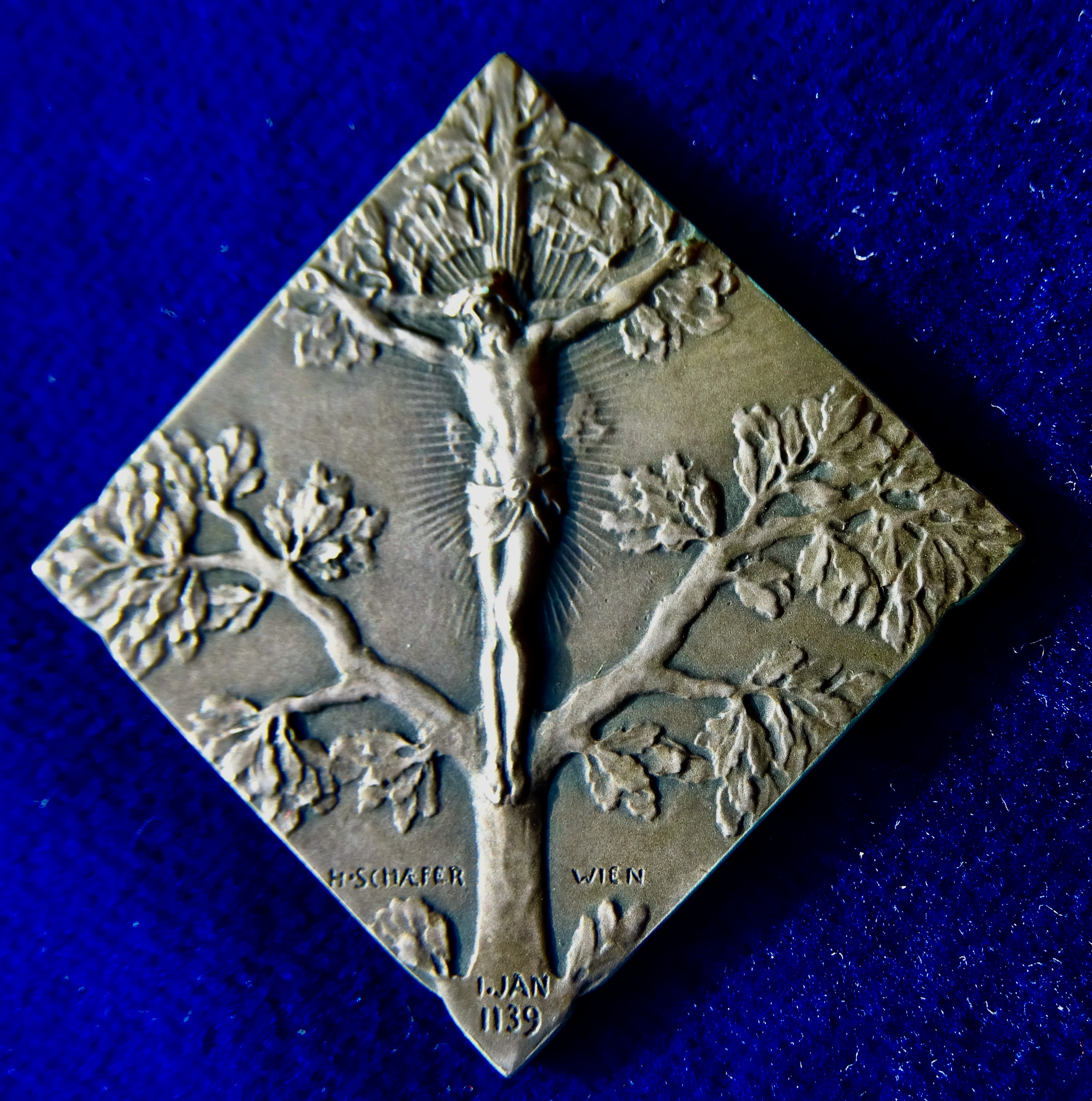
Art Nouveau medal Christ crucified into an oak tree with the opening date of the Abbey 1 January 1139

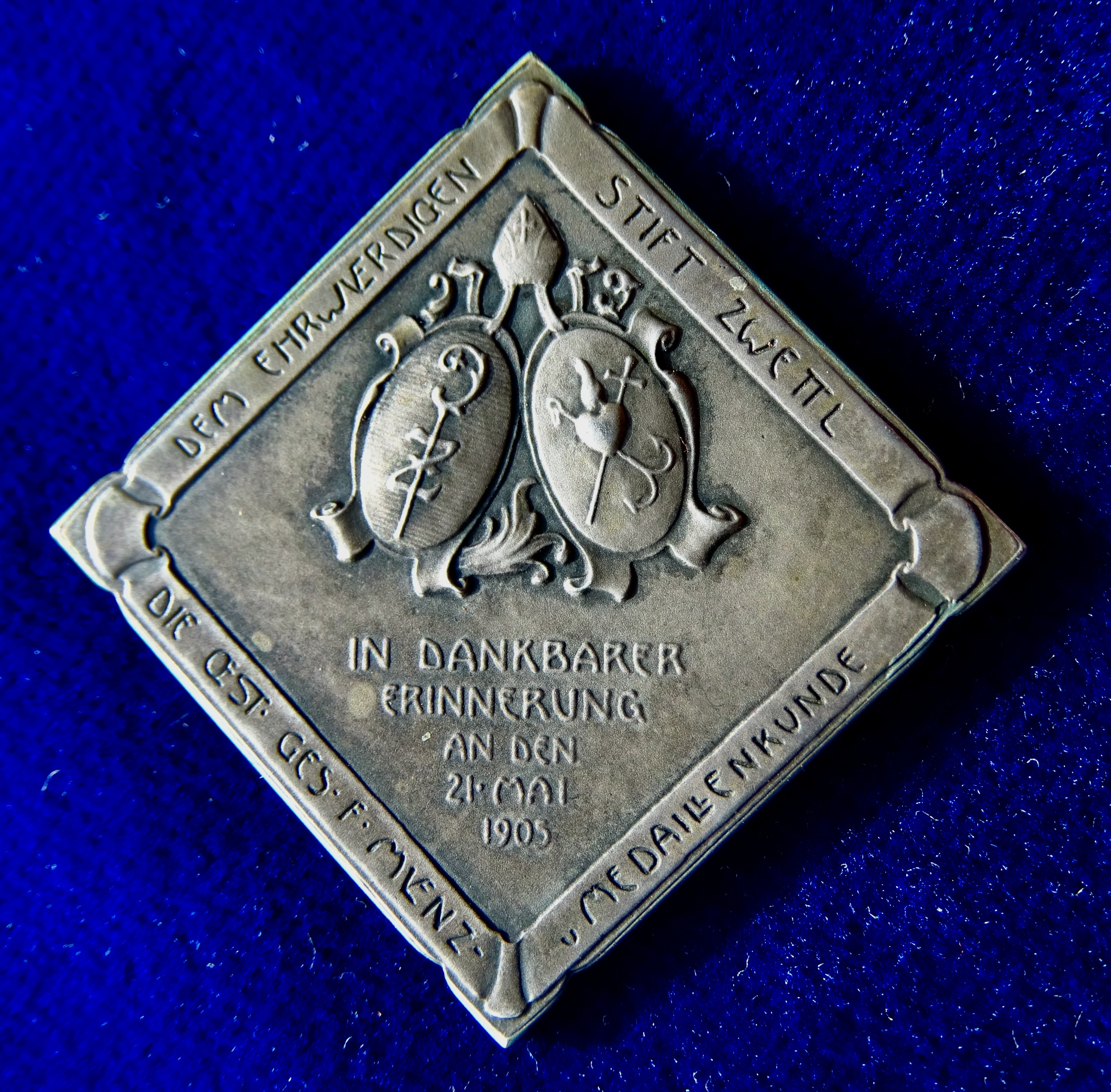
The obverse of this medal shows the shields of Zwettl Abbey and the abbot Stefan Rössler

Zwettl Abbey was founded in 1137 by Hadmar I of Kuenring, with Herrmann, a monk of Heiligenkreuz Abbey, as its first abbot (1137–47). It was a daughter house of Heiligenkreuz, of the line of Morimond. The foundation was confirmed by Hohenstaufen dynasty king Conrad III of Germany in 1139, and Pope Innocent II in 1140 and over the course of time by several other popes and emperors. Several members of the family of the founder were buried here.

The monastery was constructed, as Cistercian houses often were, in a river valley, in this case in a bend of the River Kamp. Extensive buildings were erected, and the church, chapter-room, and dormitory were blessed in 1159, though the entire monastery was not completed until 1218. Zwettl Abbey soon became one of the most important monasteries in the order.

Towards the end of the fourteenth century, the abbey was repeatedly plundered, especially in 1426, when 4,000 Hussites sacked and burned it down. It was rebuilt under Abbot John (1437–51). Near the end of the fifteenth century, over forty monks lived in Zwettl Abbey. Under the Protestant Reformation the community was reduced to six monks and one secular priest. By an imperial rescript the monastery was forced to sell one quarter of its large possessions. It flourished again under Abbot Erasmus (1512-1545) and his successors during the Baroque period, notwithstanding the Thirty Years' War and the Turkish invasion, during which it was saved from destruction by the friendship of the Count of Thurn for Abbot Siegfried.

During the administrations of Abbot Linck (1646–71), author of the Annales Austrio Claravallenses, and Abbot Melchior (1706-1747), who rebuilt a great part of the abbey and enriched it with many precious vessels and vestments, it reached its zenith. Abbot Melchior encouraged study and opened schools of philosophy, theology and so on in the monastery. During the period of Josephinism Abbot Rainer was obliged to resign, to be succeeded by a commendatory abbot (1786), but after 1804 the community was allowed to elect its own abbot. From 1878 the abbey was administered by Abbot Stephen Roessler, the sixty-first from its foundation. Besides him two other noted historians were members of Zwettl during the nineteenth century: Johann von Frast (d. 1850) and Leopold Janauschek, the author of Originum Cisterciensium.

== Buildings ==
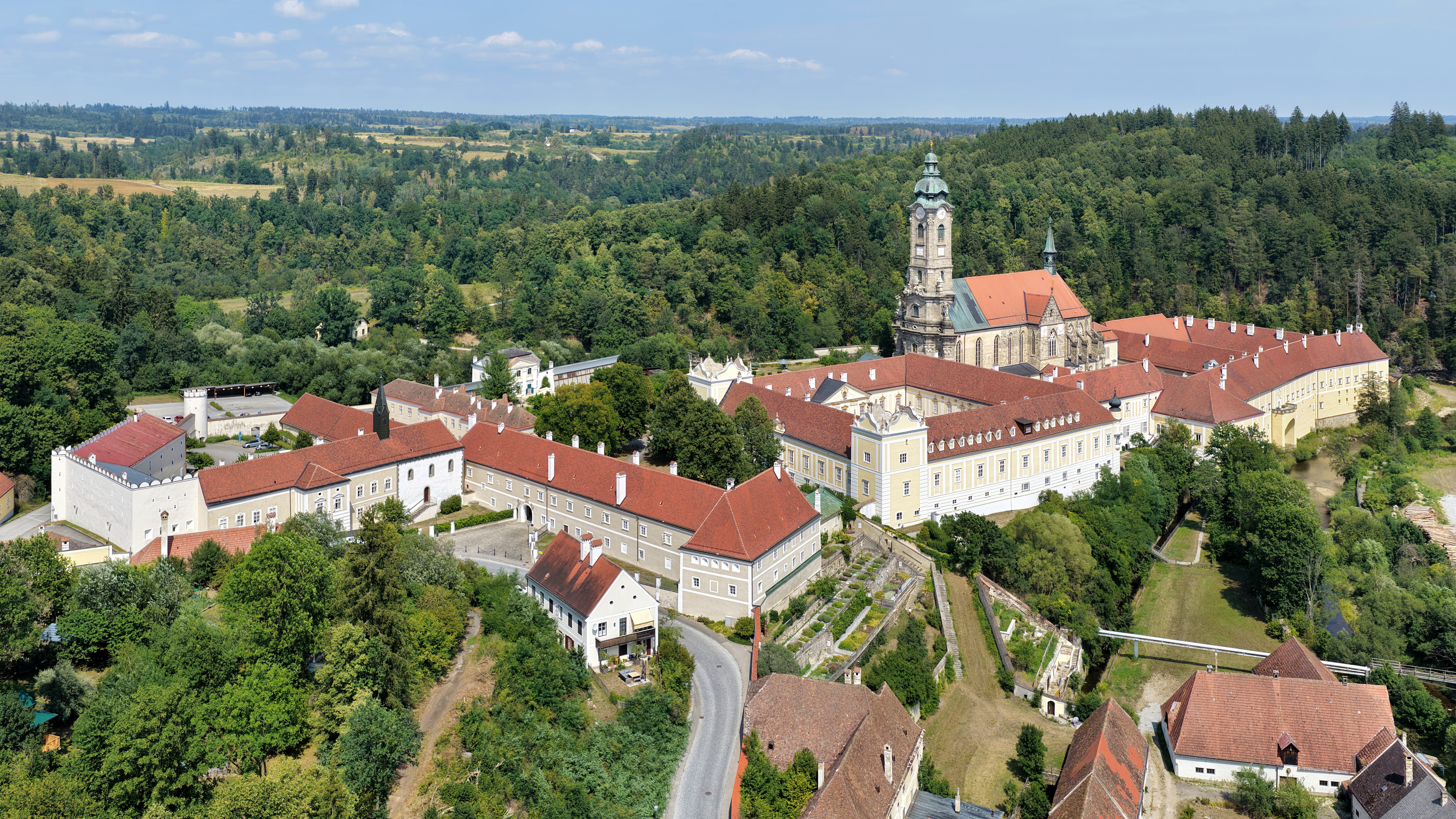
The buildings of Zwettl Abbey

The monastery contains buildings of all architectural styles from Romanesque to Baroque. The modern form of the premises is the result of the Baroque refurbishment in the 18th century, which involved the reconstruction of the principal buildings. Among other parts the western tower was constructed by Josef Munggenast to plans by Matthias Steinl. Only one other tower in Lower Austria is higher than this building's 82 meters. Another part of this construction period is the library, which contains frescoes by Paul Troger.

From 1728 to 1731 Johann Ignaz Egedacher from Passau constructed the famous Egedacher Organ, one of the biggest and most expensive organs of the region of Vienna and Lower Austria.

== Present day ==
The abbey's library contains over 60,000 volumes, 500 incunabula, and 420 manuscripts, the most famous of which is the Zwettl Stiftungsbuch ("cartulary").

The community now consists of 23 monks, who have care of fourteen incorporated parishes and four others. The monastery makes its living from a forest of about 2,500 hectares, a fish farm of 90 hectares, a farm of 110 hectares and the vineyards of Schloss Gobelsburg with about 35 hectares.

The monastery buildings now contain a school.

Every year since 1983 an organ festival has been held here.

== Gallery ==
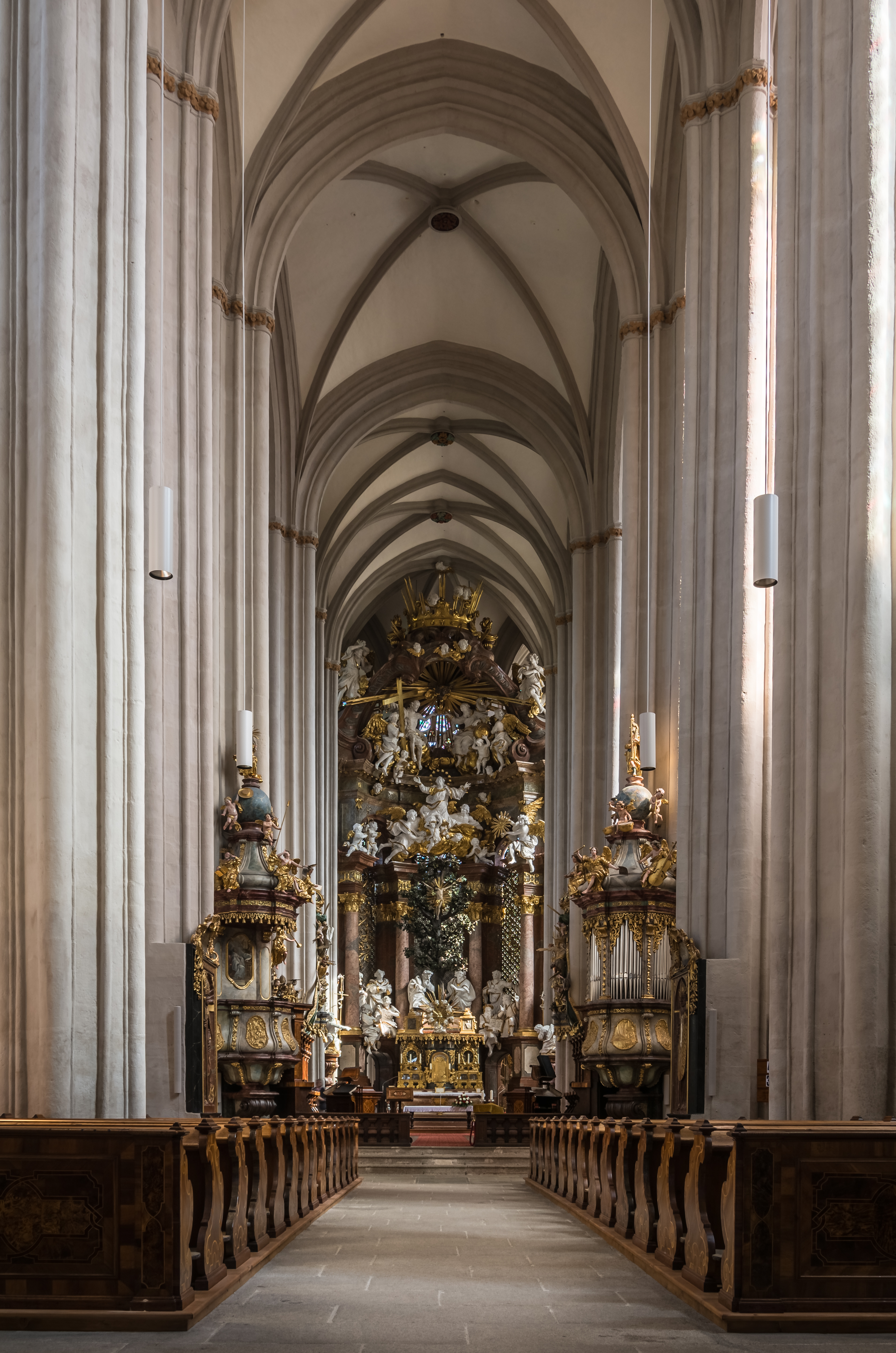
Abbey Church high altar

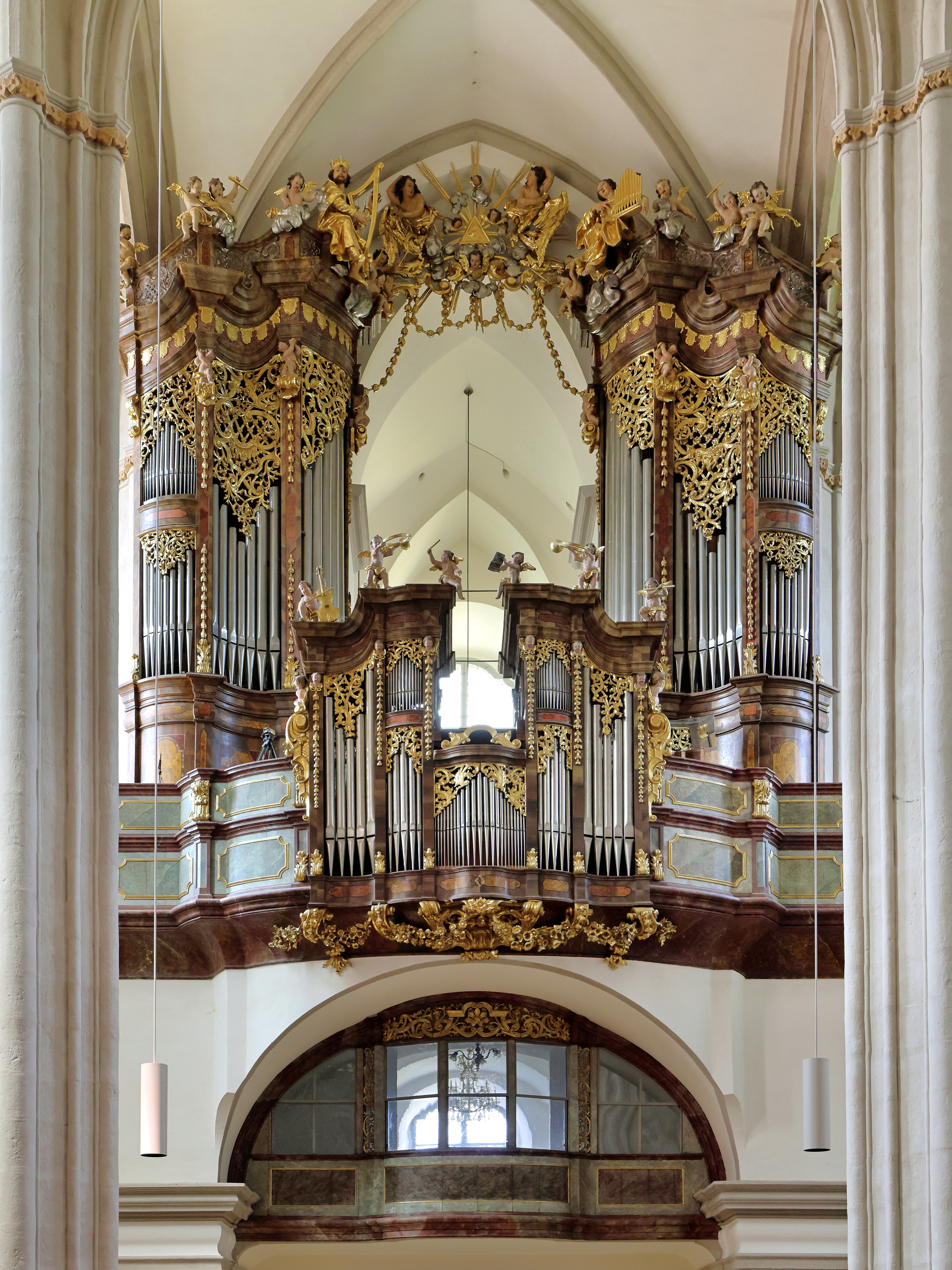
Egedacher organ

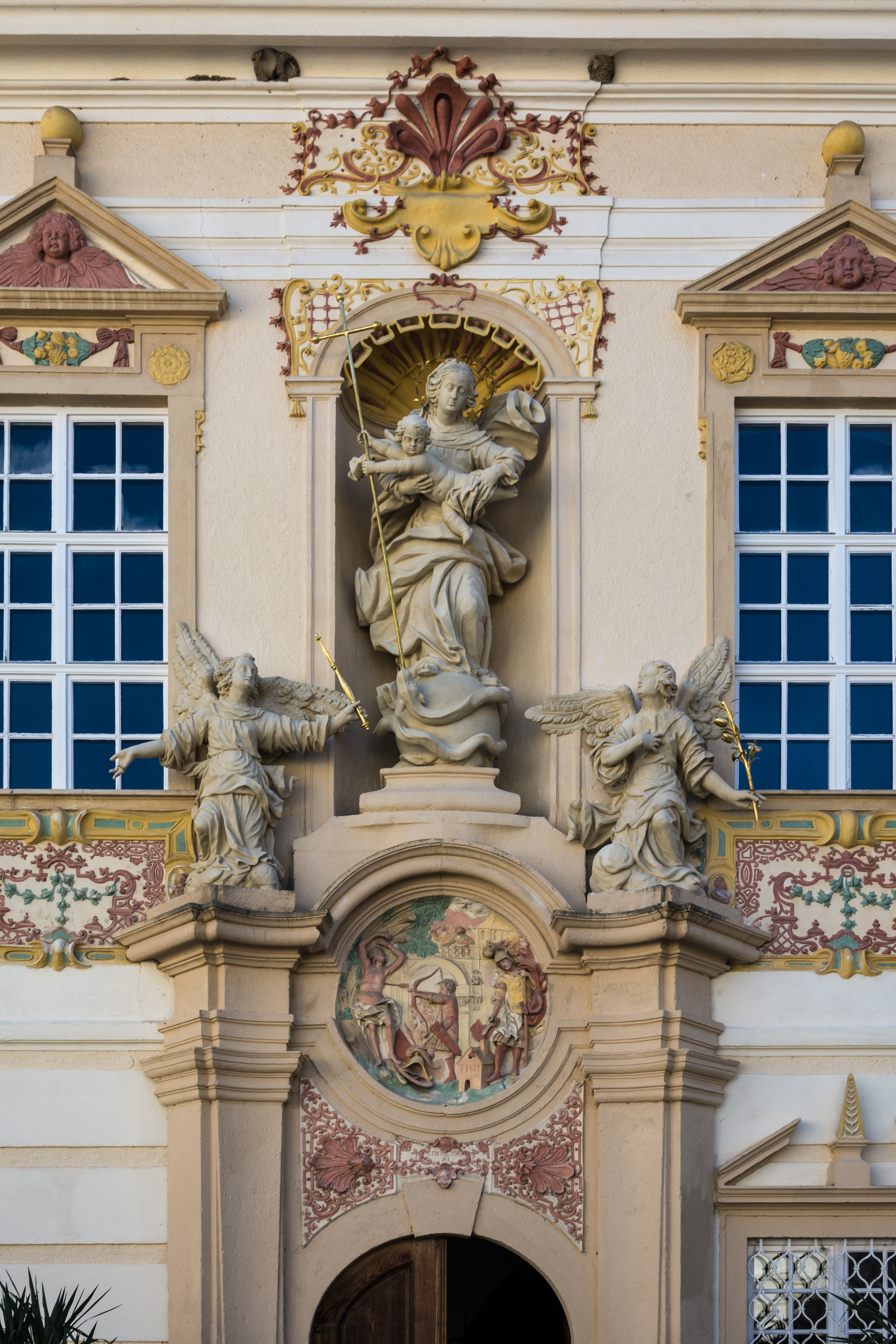
Prälatenhof façade

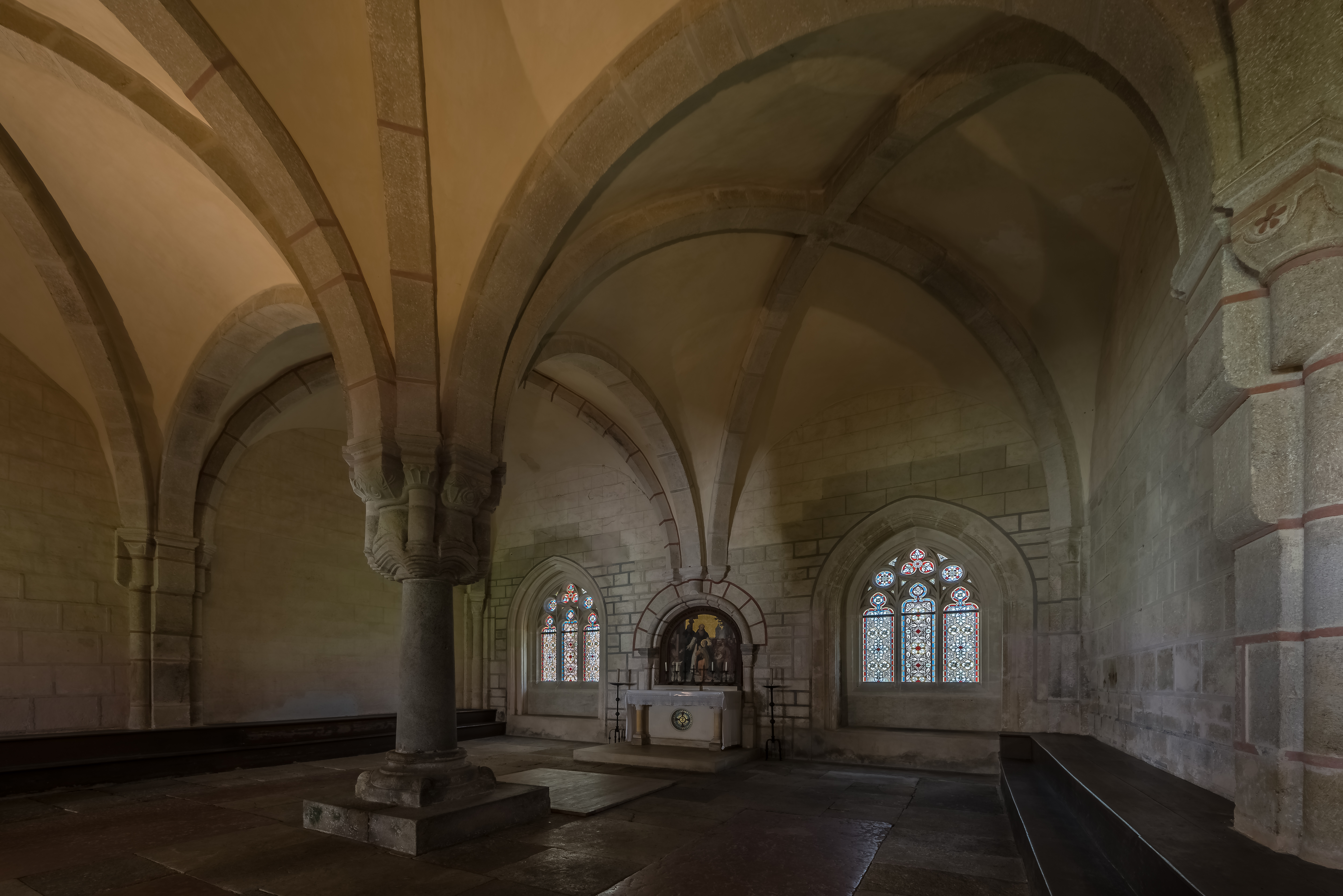
Chapter house

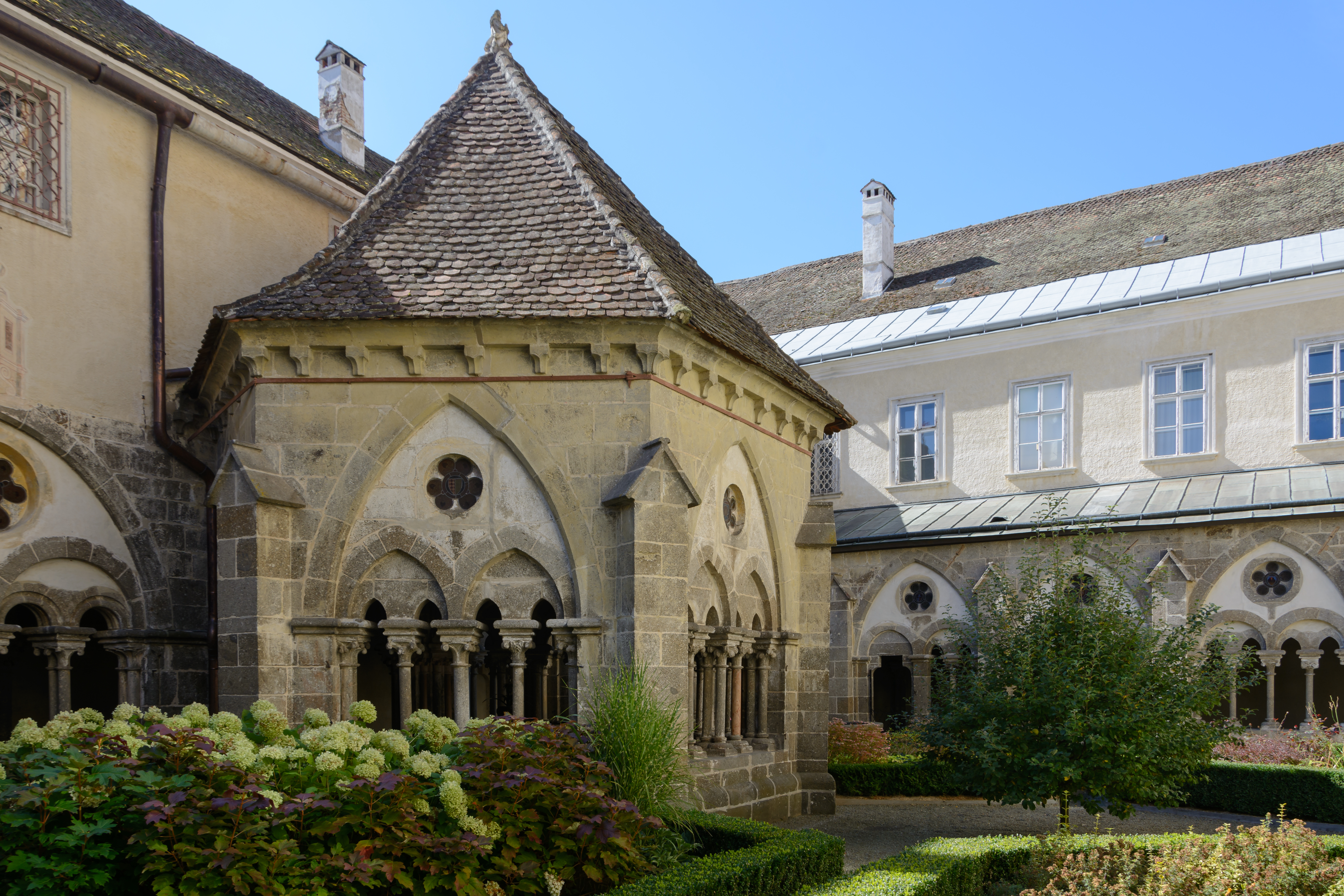
Inner courtyard and lavatorium in the cloister

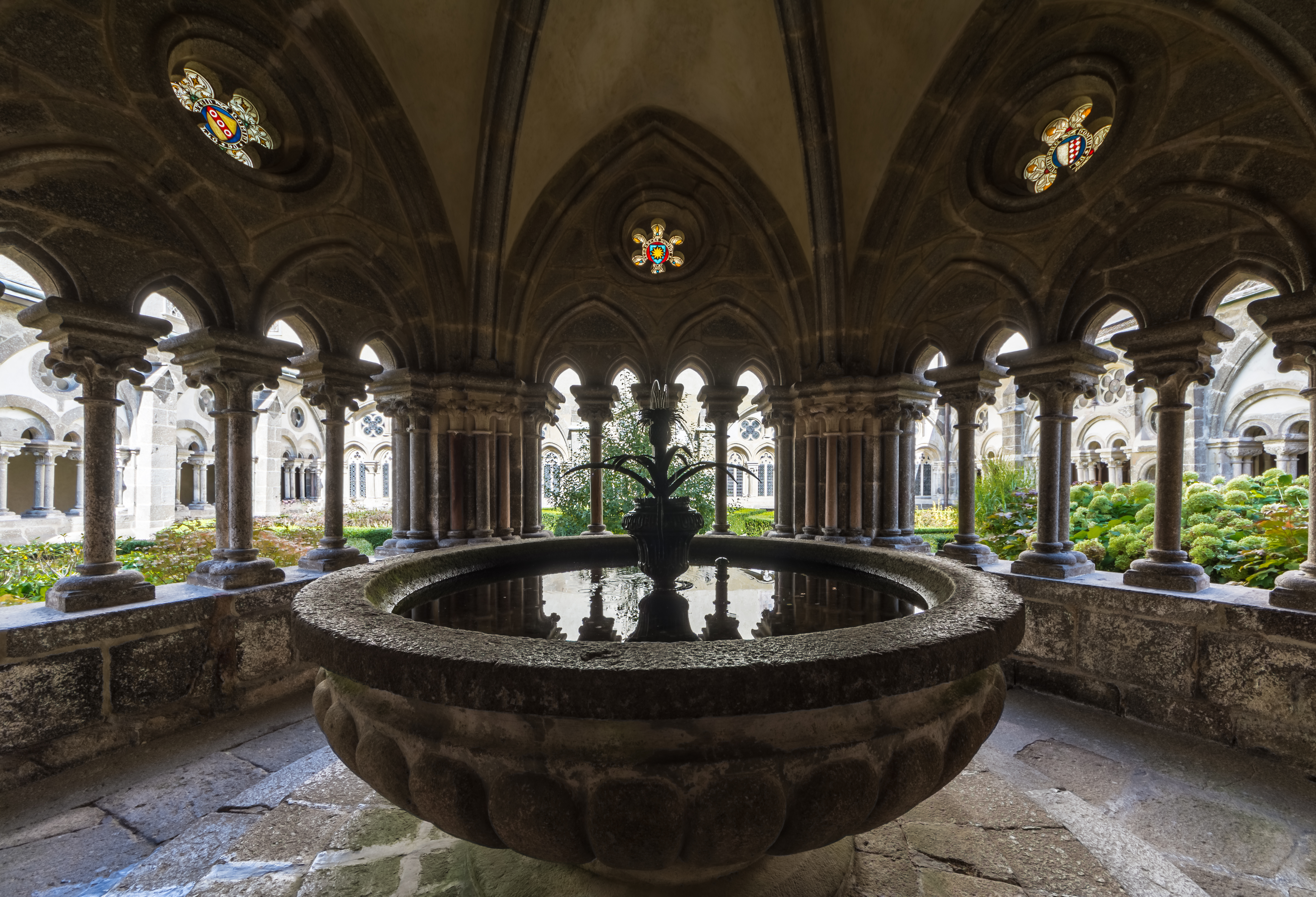
Fountain in the lavatorium

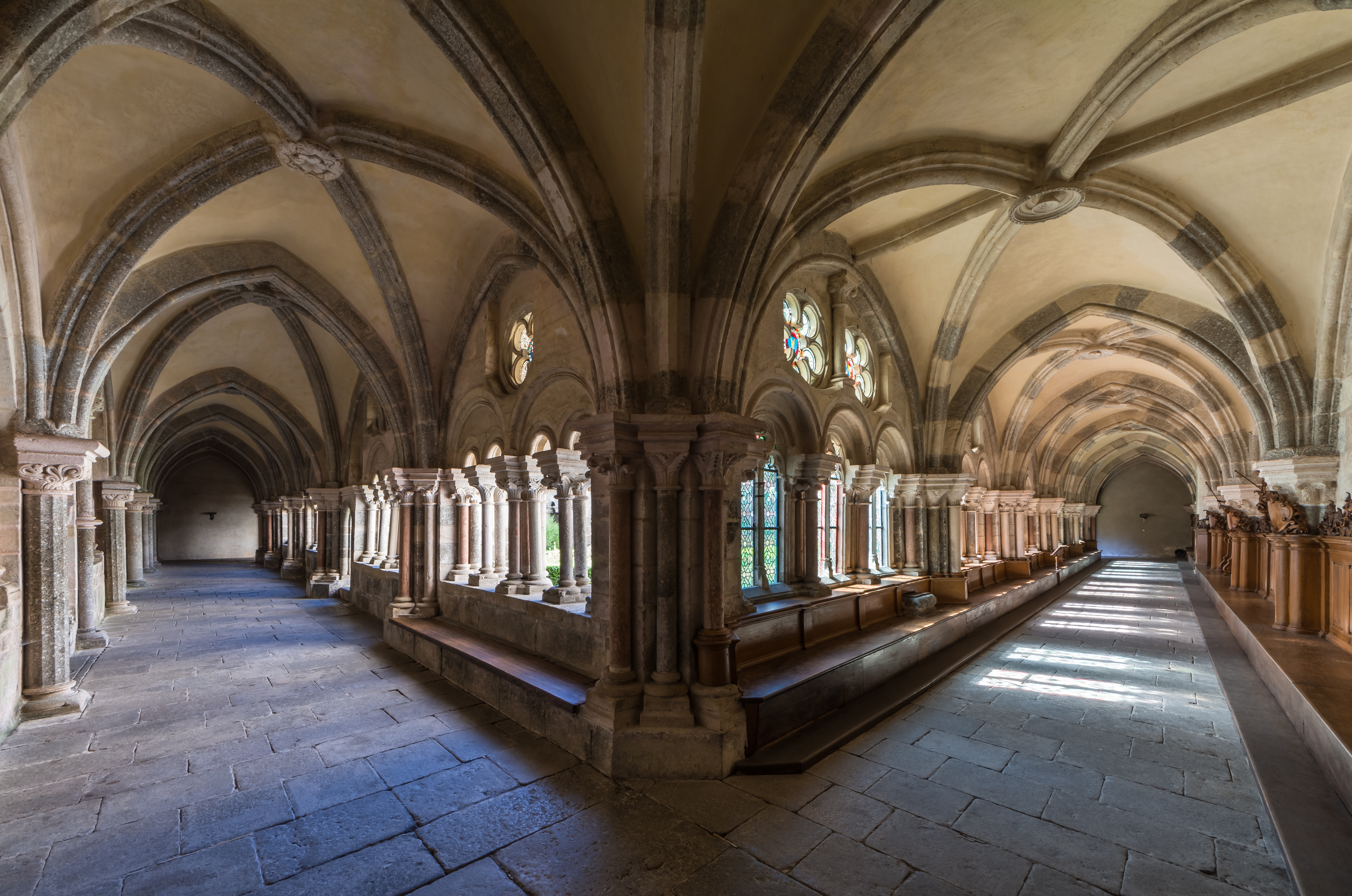
Cloister

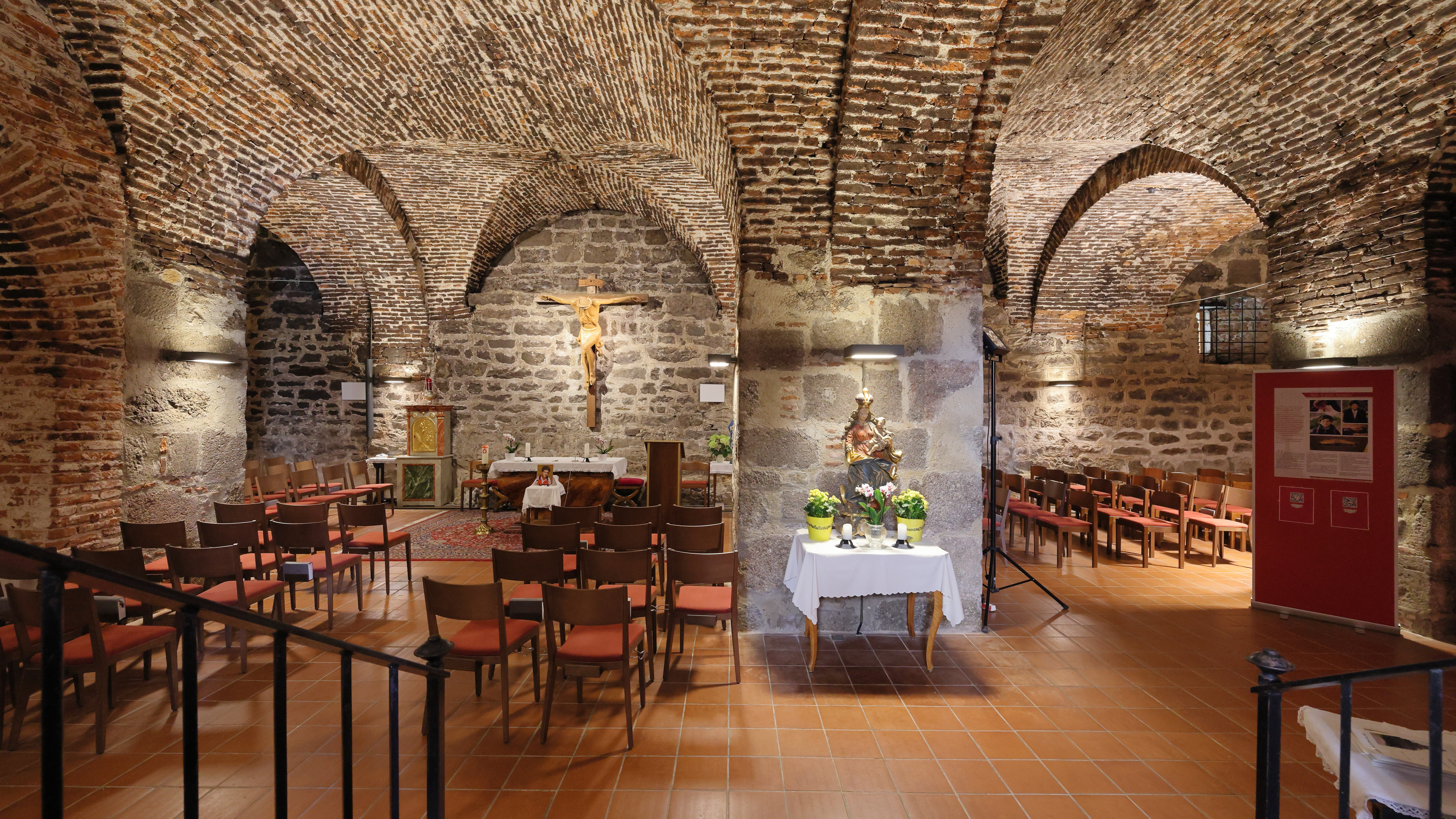
Cellarium
