= Grüner Veltliner =

Variety of grape

- Grape (Vitis)
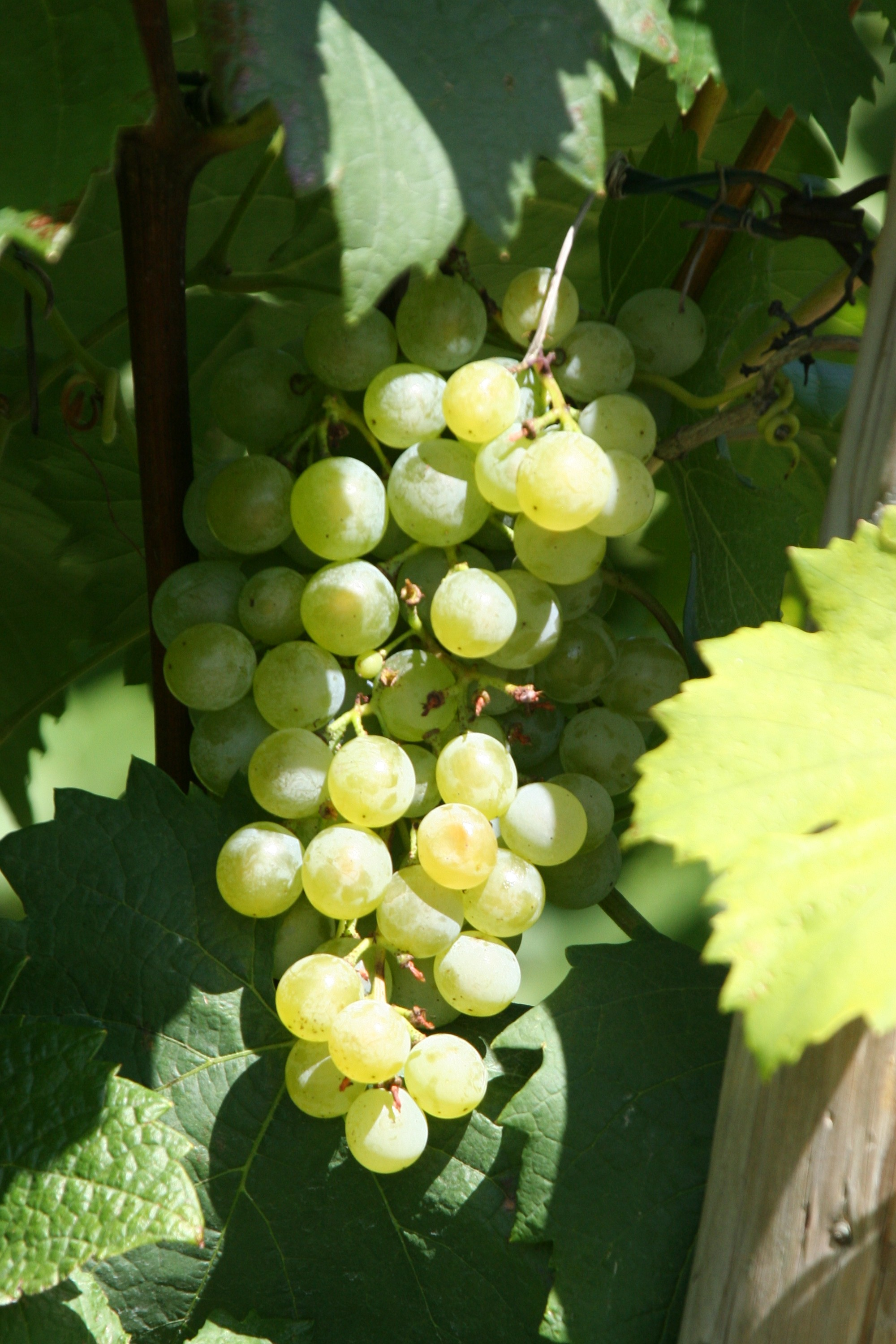
- Color of berry skin: Blanc
- Species: Vitis vinifera
- Also called: Grüner Muskateller, Veltliner (more)
- Origin: Austria?
- Notable regions: Lower Austria, Burgenland, Slovakia, Moravia
- Notable wines: Smaragds from Wachau
- VIVC number: 12930

Grüner Veltliner (Green Veltliner) German: [ˈɡʁyːnɐ fɛltˈliːnɐ]) is a white wine grape variety grown primarily in Austria, Hungary, Slovakia, and the Czech Republic. The leaves of the grape vine are five-lobed with bunches that are long but compact, and deep green grapes that ripen in mid-late October in the Northern Hemisphere.

In 2008, Grüner Veltliner plantations in Austria stood at 17,151 hectares (42,380 acres), and it accounts for 32.6% of all vineyards in the country, almost all of it being grown in the northeast of the country. Thus, it is the most-planted grape variety in Austria. Some is made into sparkling wine in the far northeast around Poysdorf. Along the Danube to the west of Vienna, in Wachau, Kremstal and Kamptal, it grows with Riesling in terraces on slopes so steep they can barely retain any soil. The result is a very pure, mineral wine capable of long aging, that stands comparison with some of the great wines of the world. In recent blind tastings organized by the Austrian Wine Marketing Board, Grüner Veltliners have beaten world-class Chardonnays from the likes of Mondavi and Maison Louis Latour.

Outside of Austria, Grüner Veltliner is the second most widely grown white grape variety in the Czech Republic, encompassing approximately 2,120 hectares (5,200 acres) and resulting in approximately 11% of Czech wine production. In recent years a few US wineries have started to grow and bottle Grüner Veltliner.

Some ampelographers (such as Hermann Goethe in his 1887 handbook of ampelography) have long assumed that Grüner Veltliner is not related to the other varieties with "Veltliner" in their name (such as Roter Veltliner), or that it is only distantly related. A first DNA analysis in the late 1990s secured Savagnin (Traminer) as one parent of Grüner Veltliner, but was not able to identify the other parent among the candidates studied. The other parent was later found to be an originally unnamed variety of which only a single, abandoned, very old and weakened vine was found in St. Georgen am Leithagebirge outside Eisenstadt in Austria. The grape is therefore referred to as St. Georgener-Rebe or "St. Georgen-vine".

Grüner Veltliner has a reputation of being a particularly food-friendly wine and is a popular offering on restaurant wine lists. It is made into wines of many different styles - much is intended for drinking young in the Heuriger (bars serving new wine) of Vienna, a little is made into sparkling wine, but some is capable of long aging. The steep vineyards of the Danube (Donau) west of Vienna produce very pure, mineral Grüner Veltliners intended for laying down. Down in the plains, citrus and peach flavors are more apparent, with spicy notes of pepper and sometimes tobacco.

== History ==
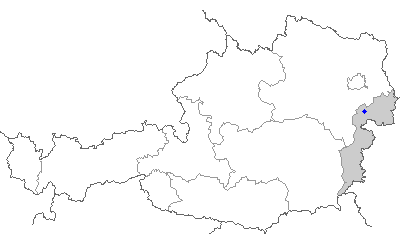
Location of Eisenstadt in the Burgenland region of eastern Austria near the town of Sankt Georgen am Leithagebirge where the surviving parent vine of Grüner Veltliner, St. Georgener-Rebe, was found

Grüner Veltliner has been believed to date back to Roman times, with its name being derived from Veltlin (Valtellina) in northern Italy, though ampelographers and wine historians have yet to find a link between the grape and the Italian commune. The grape is likely indigenous to Austria. The current name appeared in a document for the first time in 1855; before that time it was known as Weißgipfler. Only by the 1930s was Grüner Veltliner established as the standard name of the grape. Until the Second World War, it was regarded as just another Austrian grape, but after the introduction of Lenz Moser's Hochkultur system of vine training, it expanded quickly in plantation from the 1950s to later become Austria's most planted variety.

In recent years, Grüner Veltliner has seen an uptick in interest following the results of a 2002 wine tasting organized by Masters of Wine Jancis Robinson and Tim Atkin. Here Grüner Veltliner from Austria beat out several highly acclaimed white Grand cru wines from Burgundy.

=== Pedigree ===
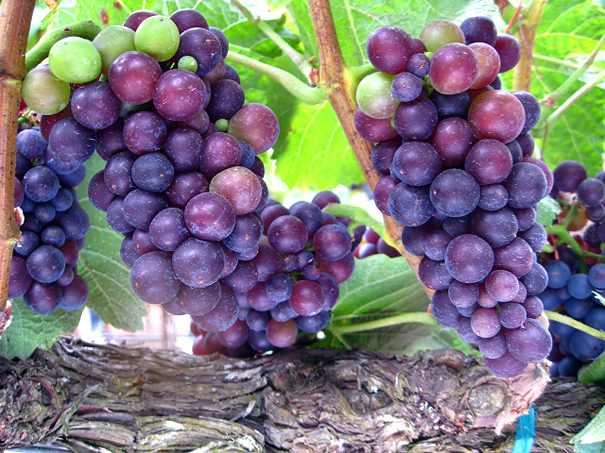
Through Savagnin, Grüner Veltliner is either a grandchild or a half-sibling of Pinot noir (pictured).

In 2007, DNA analysis confirmed that Grüner Veltliner was a natural crossing of Savagnin (Traminer) and an obscure Austrian grapevine from the village of Sankt Georgen am Leithagebirge located outside Eisenstadt in the Burgenland region of eastern Austria. The vine was first found in 2000 in an overgrown part of a pasture in a location where there had not been any vineyard since the late 19th century, and is assumed to have been the last vine in this location for over a century. Local experts were not able to determine the variety of the vine. Only when it was threatened to be ripped out in 2005 additional samples were taken and later analyzed at Klosterneuburg. Genetic analysis in the following years by Ferdinand Regner was able to determine that St. Georgener-Rebe is a parent variety to Grüner Veltliner.

St. Georgener-Rebe was once known under the synonym Grüner Muskateller but appears to have no direct relationship to the Muscat family of grapes. In February 2011, the single surviving vine of St. Georgener-Rebe, thought to be over 500 years old, was vandalized and severely cut in several places by an unknown assailant. The vine survived with the Austrian government designating the vine as a protected natural monument. Ampelographers are currently propagating cuttings of the vine for vineyard plantings and commercial cultivation.

=== Relationship to other grapes ===
Through its parent, Savagnin, Grüner Veltliner is a half sibling of Rotgipfler and is either a grandchild or a half-sibling to Pinot noir which has a parent-offspring relationship with Savagnin. The nature of this relationship is unclear since DNA profiling has not yet determined between Pinot and Savagnin which grape is the parent and which grape is the offspring.

Despite having the name Grüner Veltliner, the grape has no known connection to other Veltliner grapes including Roter Veltliner and Frühroter Veltliner. The grey-berried vine Grauer Veltliner (also known as Veltliner Grau) was once thought to be a distinct grape variety but DNA evidence in 1996 showed that it was a color mutation of Grüner Veltliner.

== Viticulture ==
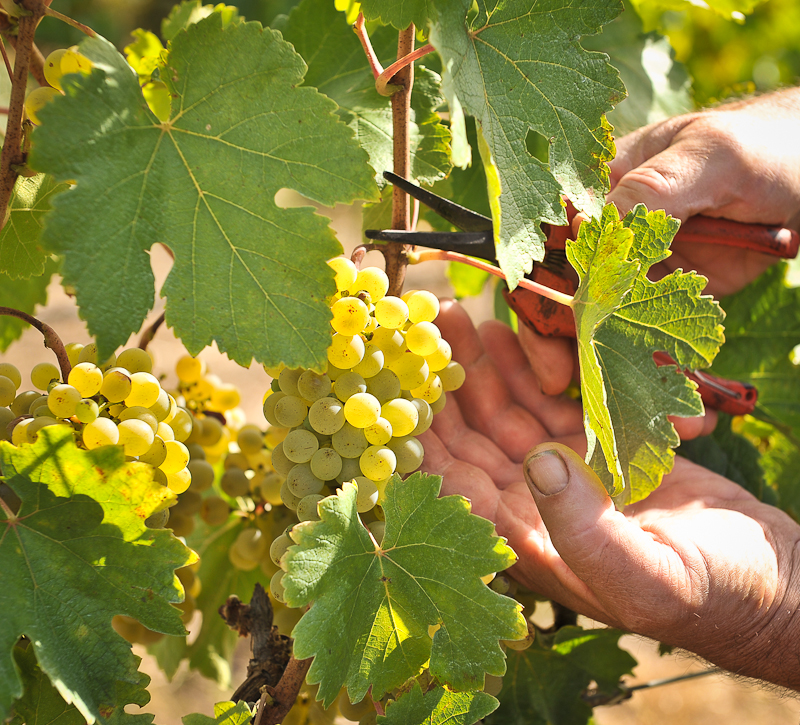
Grüner Veltliner being hand harvested at Hahndorf Hill vineyard in the Adelaide Hills

Grüner Veltliner is a mid-ripening grape variety that usually does not have an issue achieving physiological ripeness in most of the northern European wine regions where it is grown. The vine can be very fruitful and high yielding producing small, yellowish-green berries. Grüner Veltliner is very susceptible to the viticultural hazards of downy and powdery mildews as well as infestation from a species of rust mites that feed on grape leaves.

While Grüner Veltliner can grow on a variety of vineyard soils, wine expert Oz Clarke notes that the grape tends to thrive on soils with high loess content. While newer vineyards have been experimenting with a variety of vine training systems, in Austria Grüner Veltliner has been historically trained in the Lenz Moser style developed in the 1920s. Known as the "high culture" or Hochkultur method because of how relatively high (1.3 metres (4.3 ft)) the vine trunk is allowed to grow, the goal is to reduce vine density by spacing the vines in wide rows that are 3.5 meters (11.5 ft) apart.

== Wine regions ==
Grüner Veltliner is most closely associated with Austria where it is the most widely planted grape variety in the country, covering almost a third of all Austrian vineyards, with 17,034 hectares (42,092 acres) in cultivation in 2012. The grape is authorized in five Districtus Austriae Controllatus (DAC) regions—the Weinviertel where it is the only permitted grape variety; Leithaberg where it can be made as a varietal or blended with Pinot blanc, Chardonnay and Neuburger; Traisental, Kremstal and Kamptal where it is planted with Riesling. The grape is also found in the Donauland (now known as the Wagram region) and in the Wachau region of Lower Austria. Along the Danube river warm air currents come in from the Pannonian Basin to the east and blow westward, warming the vines. This area tends to produce more full bodied wines with peach flavor notes.

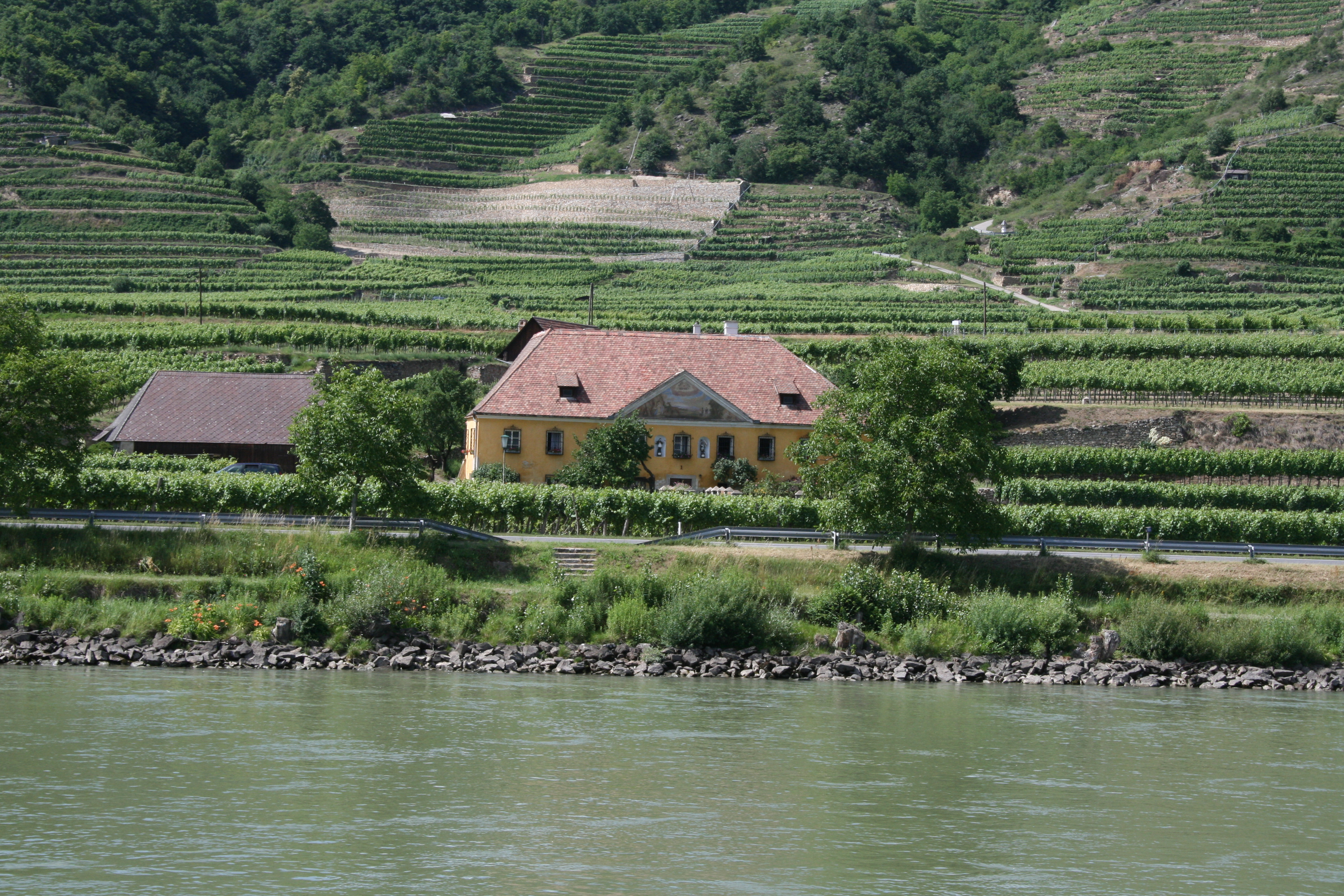
Grüner Veltliner planted in the vineyards along the Danube in Wachau

The Weinviertel region in the northeast, along the border with the Czech Republic and Slovakia, is home to more than half of all Austrian Grüner Veltliner with 8,529 hectares (21,080 acres) reported in 2012. Here the grape can achieve very high yields (up to 100 hectoliters/hectare or 5.7 tonnes/acre) and can produce simple, quaffing wines with fresh acidity and crisp fruit as well as base wine for sparkling sekt. But in vineyards on favorable locations where the yields are restricted, wine producers can make examples of full-bodied, dry Grüner Veltliner that has pepper, mineral and citrus notes that can develop Burgundian wine traits as they age.

In the vineyard area around Lake Neusiedl along the border with Hungary there is 1,272 hectares (3,143 acres) of Grüner Veltliner planted along the east side of the lake and 882 hectares (2,179 acres) planted in the Neusiedlersee-Hügelland "hill country" on the west side. Here some sweet Auslese and botryized Trockenbeerenauslese styles of Grüner Veltliner can be produced.

In Krems-Hollenburg, located just east of Krems an der Donau, one of the oldest vineyards in Austria still being used for commercial wine production is home to old vines of Grüner Veltliner that are more than 150 years old.

=== Other European wine regions ===
Grüner Veltliner is known as Veltlinske Zelené in Slovakia where it is the most widely planted white grape variety in the country. The grape's 3,805 hectares (9,402 acres) represent almost one-fifth of all grape plantings in the country. Across the border in the Czech Republic, the local synonym for Grüner Veltliner is similar, Veltlinské zelené, with 1,713 hectares (4,233 acres) in production as of 2011.

In Trentino-Alto Adige/Südtirol wine region of north east Italy, along the border with Austria, virtually any grapevine with Veltliner in its name (particularly Veltliner bianco) is likely to be Grüner Veltliner. At one point Frühroter Veltliner was planted in old vineyards of the Alto-Adige but most of those vines have been uprooted and replaced with other varieties. Grüner Veltliner is a permitted variety in the Denominazione di origine controllata (DOC) wines of Valdadige DOC and Valle Isarco DOC.

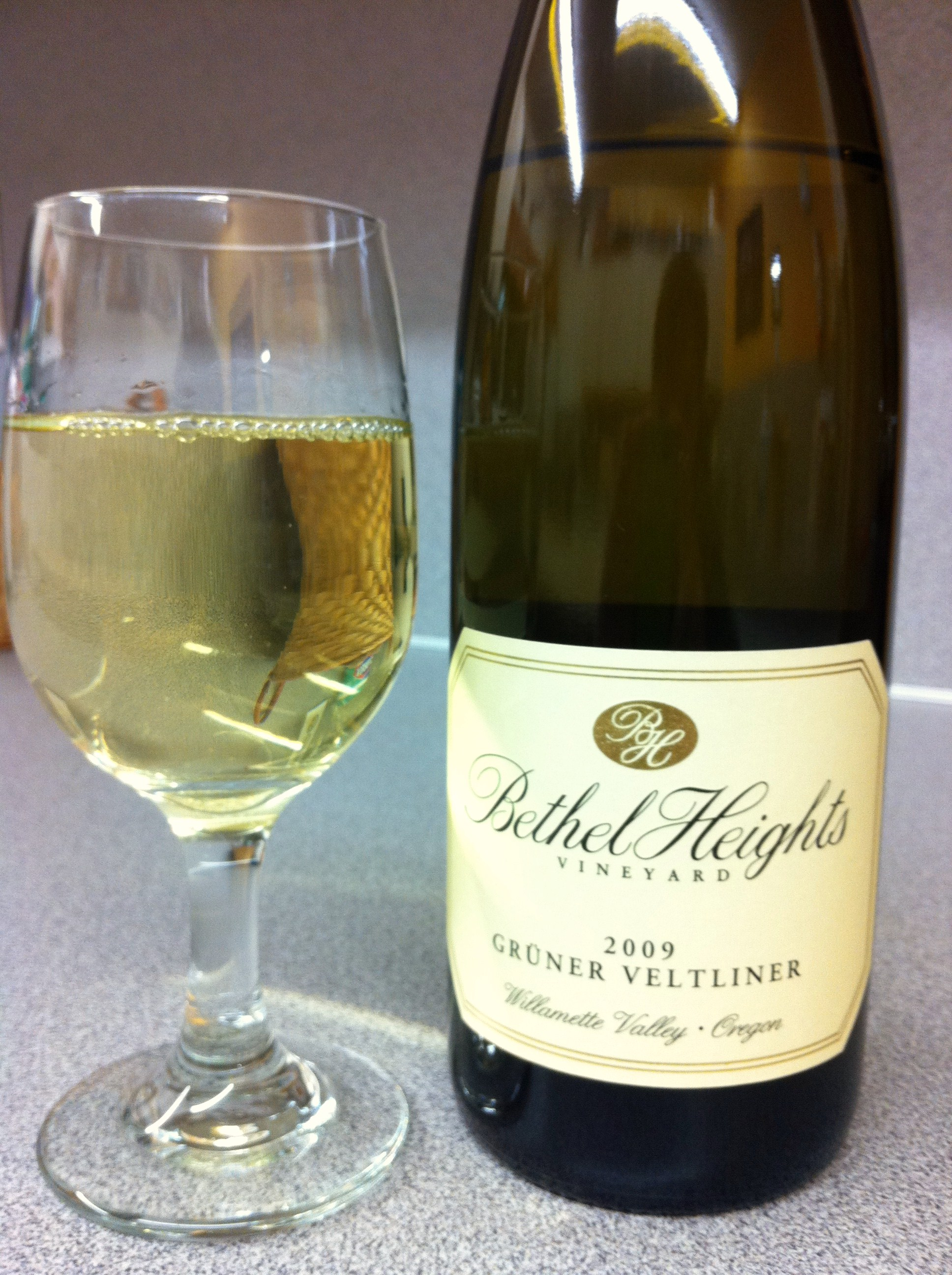
A Grüner Veltliner from the Willamette Valley wine region of Oregon

In Germany, Grüner Veltliner is the grape behind the historic Hansenwein produced in the village of Plochingen located outside Stuttgart in the Württemberg wine region. In France, the grape is not permitted in any Appellation d'origine contrôlée (AOC) wine however there are a few hectares of Grüner Veltliner being cultivated on an experimental basis in the country.

There is 1,439 hectares (3,560 acres) of Grüner Veltliner planted in Hungary where the grape is known as Zöld Veltlini. The majority of these plantings are found in the western wine regions around Lake Balaton, the northern vineyards in the foothills of the Mátra mountains and the southern wine regions of Tolna County and Kunság. Some plantings of Grüner Veltliner can also be found in Bulgaria.

=== In the New World ===
In recent years, plantings of Grüner Veltliner have been expanding in the New World wine regions of Australia, New Zealand, the United States and Canada. In New Zealand, the grape was first planted in the Gisborne region on the North Island where the first commercial bottle of the wine was released by Coopers Creek Vineyard in 2008. From here plantings of Grüner Veltliner spread to the South Island wine regions of Marlborough and Central Otago. It is grown in Central by Ata Mara vineyards one of the southernmost vineyards in the world. The first bottle of Gruner Veltliner was produced by Ata Mara in 2013. Central Otago has a climate similar to the region of Wachau in Austria with hot day time temperatures and cool nights.

In Canada, Grüner Veltliner is found in British Columbia. Across the border in the United States, the grape is planted on a small scale in California, Washington State, Oregon, Idaho, and New York. In Oregon, the grape is found in the American Viticultural Areas of the Chehalem Mountains, Eola-Amity Hills, Willamette Valley and Umpqua Valley. In the Umpqua Valley, Reustle Prayer Rock Vineyards is believed to be the first winery in the United States to produce a commercial Grüner Veltliner with their 2005 release.. They currently produce several wines from the grape, including a sparkling, oaked, and Smaragd style named the "Green Lizard". Other notable Oregon Growers include Chehalem Winery, Raptor Ridge Winery, and Illahe Vineyards. New York State's Finger Lakes AVA is home to some small plantings of Grüner Veltliner due to the cool climate and proximity to the glacially formed Finger Lakes which help mitigate excessive cold in the early spring and the winter. Lamoreaux Landing is one of a few notable Finger Lakes wineries that produces Grüner Veltliner.

Additional American plantings of Grüner Veltliner are found in Maryland, Virginia, in the Outer Coastal Plain AVA of New Jersey and in the Lehigh Valley AVA of Pennsylvania. American Grüner Veltliners tend to be medium bodied, lightly fruity with high acidity and spice notes.

In California, one of the early plantings of Grüner Veltliner was in the Diamond Mountain District AVA of Napa Valley. In 2006, the 1/3 acre planting of the grape at Von Strasser Winery in Diamond Mountain was the only recorded planting of Grüner Veltliner in the state of California.

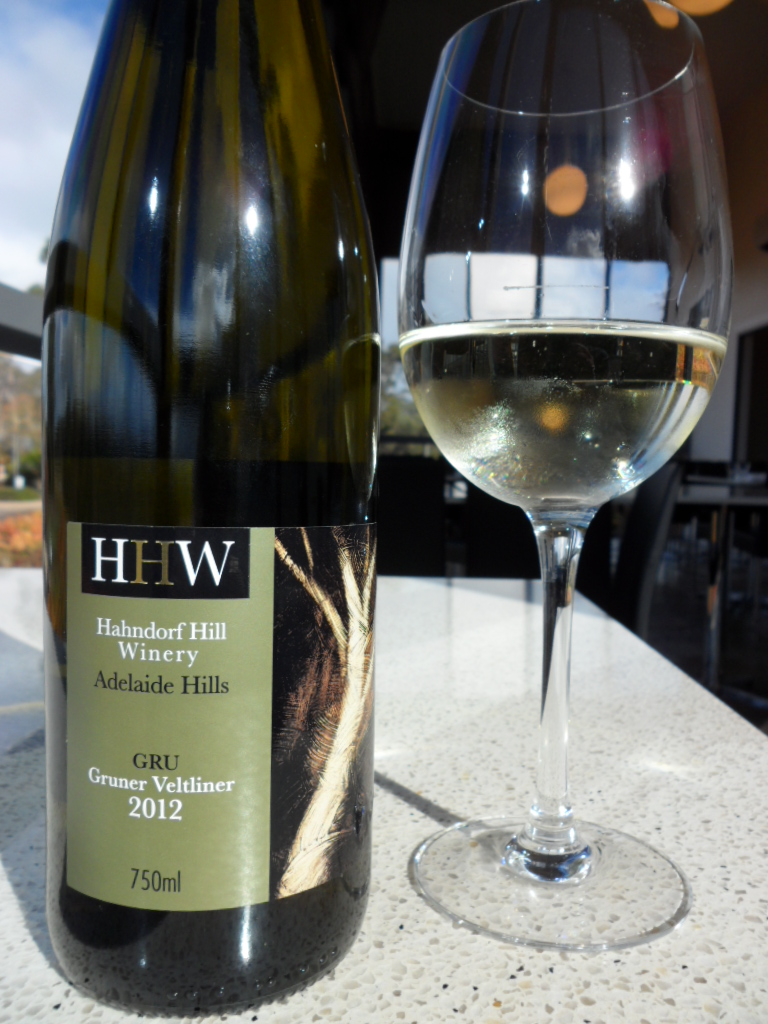
An Australian Gruner from Hahndorf Hill Winery in the Adelaide Hills

In Australia, Grüner Veltliner has seen an increase of interest and plantings which has led wine expert James Halliday to speculate that the grape may be "the next big thing" in Australian wine. One of the earliest Grüner Veltliner plantings in the country was in the Adelaide Hills wine region in the state of South Australia in 2008 by Hahndorf Hill Winery. The grape planting is part of an extensive effort of Adelaide Hills grower, chaired by Henschke's viticulturist, Prue Henschke, to make Grüner Veltliner a signature variety for the region. Here the region's large diurnal temperature variation allow the grape to build sugar levels during the warm days but maintain a balance of acidity during the cool nights.

The first varietal bottling of Grüner Veltliner in Australia was released in 2009 by the Canberra winery Lark Hill followed by Hahndorf Hill in 2010.

== Styles ==
Grüner Veltliner can be produced in a variety of styles from simple jug wine meant to be consumed soon after the vintage to ageworthy wine that can continue to develop in the bottle. According to wine expert Oz Clarke, Grüner Veltliner is usually not very aromatic in its youth, developing more tertiary aromas with age. Instead the grape often shows white pepper, lentil and celery note with some examples showing citrus notes and more full bodied examples having what Clarke describes as a "honeyed weight" to them.

Despite many believing that white pepper aromatics (Rotundone) is a signature feature of Gruner Veltliner, it has been regularly noted in articles by wine expert Jancis Robinson and other writers on Ms. Robinson's web pages, that this is not the case. In recent decades, Ms Robinson has observed that this white pepper characteristic has become less noticeable and nowadays, more often than not, is absent in many classic examples of this variety.

According to wine expert Tom Stevenson, Grüner Veltliner is often lightly fruity with noticeable spice and characteristic white pepper note. Well-made examples from favorable vintages can have a similarity to Chardonnay produced in Burgundy. And, like Chardonnay, the variety can be made in an overly oaky and "fat" style. Unoaked examples can exhibit a minerality similar to Riesling.

Master of Wine Jancis Robinson notes that Grüner Veltliner is usually produced dry with spicy, peppery notes. It is often full-bodied and with age can take on aromas and flavors similar to white Burgundies.

== Synonyms ==
Over the years Grüner Veltliner, which colloquially is sometimes referred to as GrüVe, has been known under the following synonyms: Bielospicak, Cima Biancam, Dreimänner, Feherhegyü, Feldlinger, Grauer Veltliner (in Austria), Green Veltliner, Grün Muskateller, Grüne Manhardsrebe, Grüner, Grüner Muskateler (in Austria), Grüner Muskateller (in common usage until the 1930s), Grüner Velteliner, Grüner Weissgipfler, Grüner Weltliner, Grünmuskateller, Gruner Veltliner, Manhardsrebe, Manhardtraube, Manhartsrebe, Mauhardsrebe, Mouhardrebe, Mouhardsrebe, Muskatel, Muskatel Zeleny, Nemes Veltelini, Plinia Austriaca, Ranfol bianco, Ranfol Bijeli, Ranfol Weisser, Rdeci Veltinec, Reifler Weiss, Ryvola Bila, Tarant Bily, Valtelin blanc, Valtelina vert, Valteliner, Valteliner blanc, Valteliner vert, Velteliner Grüner, Velteliner vert, Velteliner Weisser, Veltelini Zöld, Veltlin Zeleny, Veltlinac Zeleni, Veltlinec, Veltliner (in Alto Adige), Veltliner blanc, Veltliner grau (in Austria), Veltliner Grun, Veltliner Gruner, Veltliner Grün, Veltliner verde, Veltlini, Veltlinske zelené (in Slovakia), Veltlínské zelené (in Czech Republic), Veltlinski Zelenii, Veltlinsky Vert, Veltlinsky Zeleny, Vetlinac, Vetlinac Zeleni, Weisser Raifler, Weisser Reifler, Weisser Valteliner, Weisser Velteliner, Weisser Veltliner, Weissgipfler (in Austria), Weissgipfler Grüner, Yesil Veltliner, Zeleni Vetlinac (in Slovenia), Zeleny Muskatel, Zleni Veltinac, Zöld Muskotally, Zöld Muskotalynak, Zöld Veltelini (in Hungary), Zöld Velteliny, Zöldveltelini and Zold Veltelini.
