= Krems (Lower Austria) =

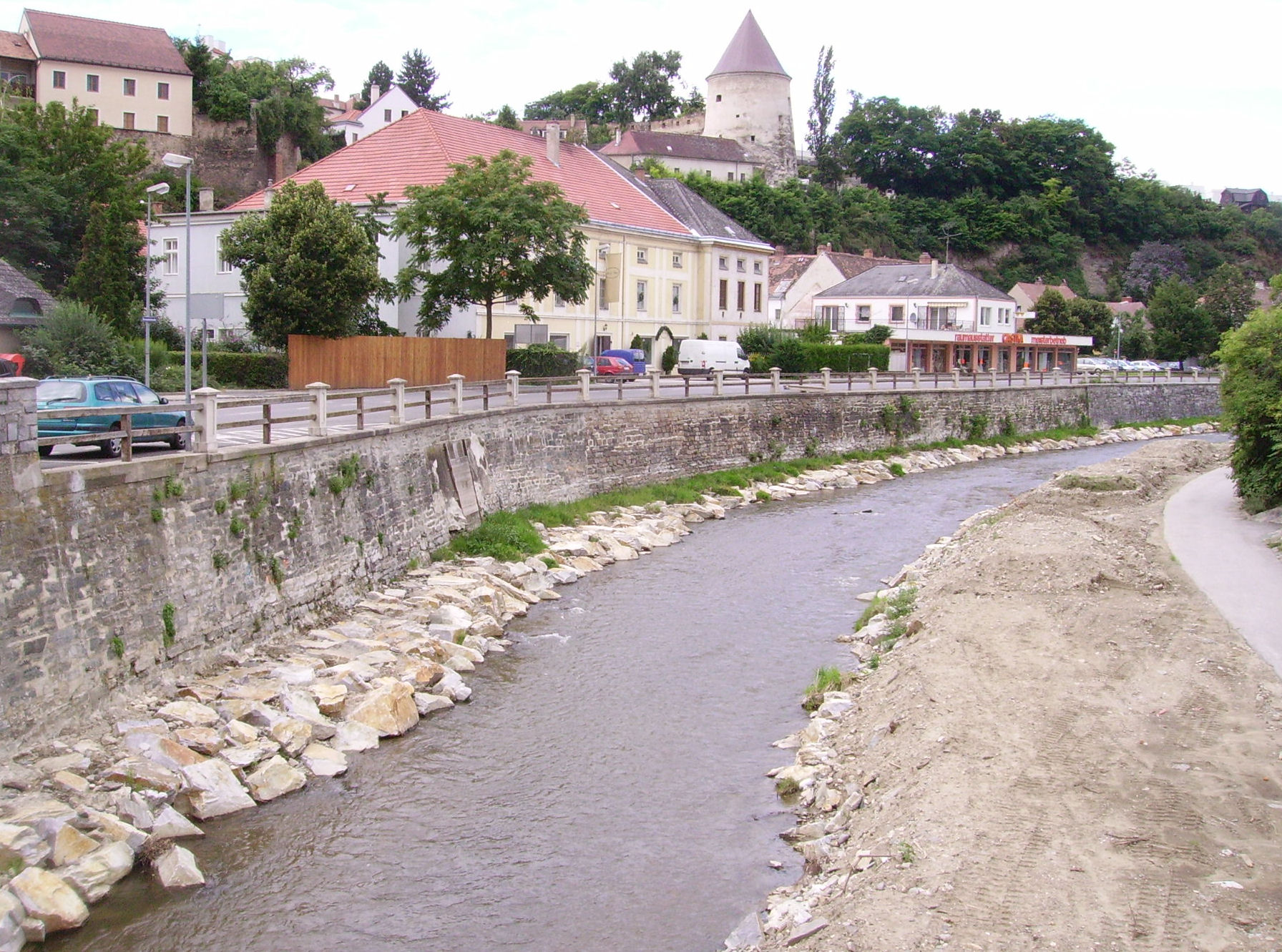

Location
- Country: Austria
- State: Lower Austria

Physical characteristics
- Source
  - location: Waldviertel
- Mouth: Kamp
  - coordinates: 48°23′02″N 15°47′50″E
- Length: 64.5 km (40.1 mi)
- Basin size: 366 km^{2} (141 sq mi)

Basin features
- Progression: Kamp→ Danube→ Black Sea

The Krems is a river in Waldviertel in northern Lower Austria. Its drainage basin is 366 km^{2} (141 sq mi). There are actually two rivers: the so-called "Große Krems" (Greater Krems), denoting either the whole river system or the main tributary only, and the smaller one called "Kleine Krems" (Lesser Krems). The Krems originally flowed into the Danube by Krems an der Donau, but when the Danube power station Altenwörth was built at Altenwörth (part of Kirchberg am Wagram), the mouth of the river — together with that of the Kamp — was moved to Altenwörth.

In the upper course both rivers flow through the rough granite landscape of the Waldviertel; important places are Großreinprechts at the Große Krems, and Kottes-Purk at the Kleine Krems. The Krems is the backbone of the wine region of Kremstal, it passes Senftenberg and the ruins of Lengenfeld, and after emerging from the granite and gneiss plateau (part of the Bohemian Massif), it flows through the Tulln Basin near Krems.

Beneath the castle Burg Hartenstein, at the confluence of the headstreams, is the Gudenus Cave by the riverbank, which was inhabited in the Stone Age.

== See also ==
- Krems (Upper Austria)
