= SC Zwettl =

- Full name: Zwettler Sportclub
- Founded: 1945
- Ground: Sportanlage Edelhof
- Capacity: 2000
- Chairman: (Austria)
- Coach: (Croatia) Ljubo Petrović
- League: 1. Niederösterreichische Landesliga
- 2007/2008: 13th

SC Swettl is an Austrian association football club playing in the city of Zwettl.The club plays in the 4th tier 1. Niederösterreichische Landesliga.

== Current squad ==
Note: Flags indicate national team as defined under FIFA eligibility rules; some limited exceptions apply. Players may hold more than one non-FIFA nationality.

No.	Pos.	Nation	Player
1	GK	AUT	Lukas Klamert
22	GK	AUT	Martin Schlogl
3	DF	AUT	Markus Petrovic
4	DF	CZE	Vladimír Dobal
5	DF	AUT	Christian Brunner
17	DF	AUT	Markus Brunner
18	DF	AUT	Valentin Grabovac
—	MF	AUT	Niki Pop
2	MF	CZE	Jiří Havelka
6	MF	AUT	Gerald Klamert
7	MF	AUT	Gunter Schrenk

No.	Pos.	Nation	Player
8	MF	AUT	Florian Metz
9	MF	AUT	Thomas Mullner
11	MF	AUT	Mario Brunner
12	MF	CRO	Matej Mitrović
13	FW	AUT	Markus Wimmer
14	FW	AUT	Gregor Schmidt
15	FW	AUT	Armin Paradeiz
—	FW	AUT	Tolga Yigit
35	MF	AUT	Clemens Seidl
