= Zwettl =

Zwettl Zwedl
- Municipality
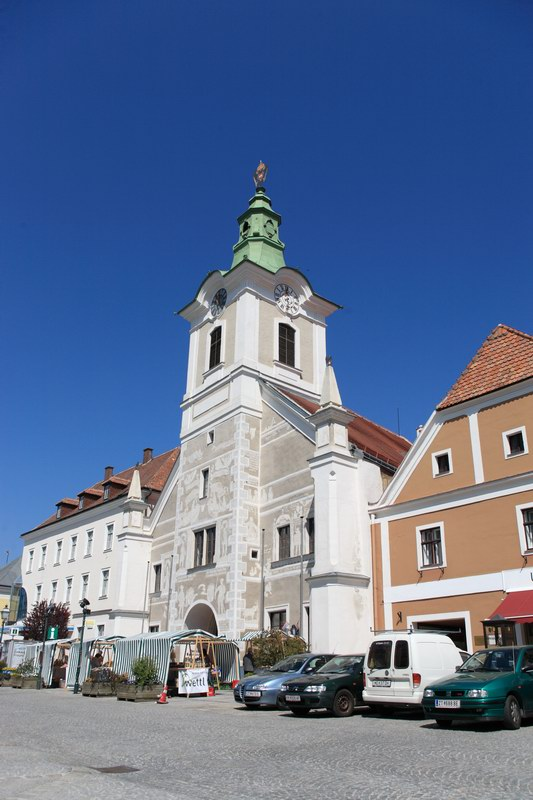
- Old Town Hall

- Coat of arms

- Location within Austria
- Coordinates: 48°36′12″N 15°10′08″E
- Country: Austria
- State: Lower Austria
- District: Zwettl

Government
  - Mayor: Franz Mold (ÖVP)

Area
  - Total: 256.31 km^{2} (98.96 sq mi)
- Elevation: 520 m (1,710 ft)

Population (2018-01-01)
  - Total: 10,908
  - Density: 42.558/km^{2} (110.22/sq mi)
- Time zone: UTC+1 (CET)
  - Summer (DST): UTC+2 (CEST)
- Postal code: 3910
- Area code: 02822
- Vehicle registration: ZT
- Website: www.zwettl.gv.at

Zwettl (German pronunciation: [ˈt͡svɛtl̩]; Central Bavarian: Zwedl; Czech: Světlá) is a town and district capital of the Austrian state of Lower Austria. It is chiefly known as the location of Zwettl Abbey, first mentioned in October 1139.

== History ==
Southwest view of Zwettl Abbey

The name originates from Slavic svetla, meaning 'glade'. Although the etymology suggests an early population of Slavs, no archaeological evidence has been found yet. Zwettl was founded by the knights of Kuenring and was first mentioned in a monastery record in 1139. It was granted town privileges on 28 December 1200. Today, the Cistercian convent in Zwettl houses the only remaining manuscript of the life of the beguine mystic Agnes Blannbekin.

== Geography ==
Zwettl has a total area of 98.9 square miles (256.7 km^{2}). The town is found in the middle of Waldviertel at the confluence of the Kamp and Zwettl rivers at the upper part of Kamptal. After Vienna and Wolfsberg in Carinthia, it is the third largest municipality in Austria by area.

== Population ==
Historical population
Year	Pop.	±%
1869	12,643	—
1880	13,121	+3.8%
1890	12,961	−1.2%
1900	13,617	+5.1%
1910	13,585	−0.2%
1923	12,946	−4.7%
1934	12,746	−1.5%
1939	12,806	+0.5%
1951	12,862	+0.4%
1961	11,374	−11.6%
1971	11,677	+2.7%
1981	11,479	−1.7%
1991	11,427	−0.5%
2001	11,630	+1.8%
2011	11,272	−3.1%

== Notable people ==
- Michael von Puchberg (1741–1822), promoter and estate administrator of Mozart, merchant and philanthropist
- Georg Ritter von Schönerer, (1842–1921); died here
- Hugo Jury, (1887–1945), physician and National Socialist politician; lived here
- Benno Mengele (1898–1971), electrical engineer
- Walter Nowotny, (1920–1944), Luftwaffe officer; lived here
- Peter Härtling, (born 1933), writer and poet; lived here
- Josef Haslinger (born 1955), writer
- Christoph Jank (born 1973), footballer
- Florian Metz, (born 1985), footballer
- Andreas Haider-Maurer (born 1987), tennis player
- Andreas Onea (born 1992), Paralympic swimmer
