= Gudenus Cave =

Cave and archaeological site in Austria

- Gudenushöhle (German)
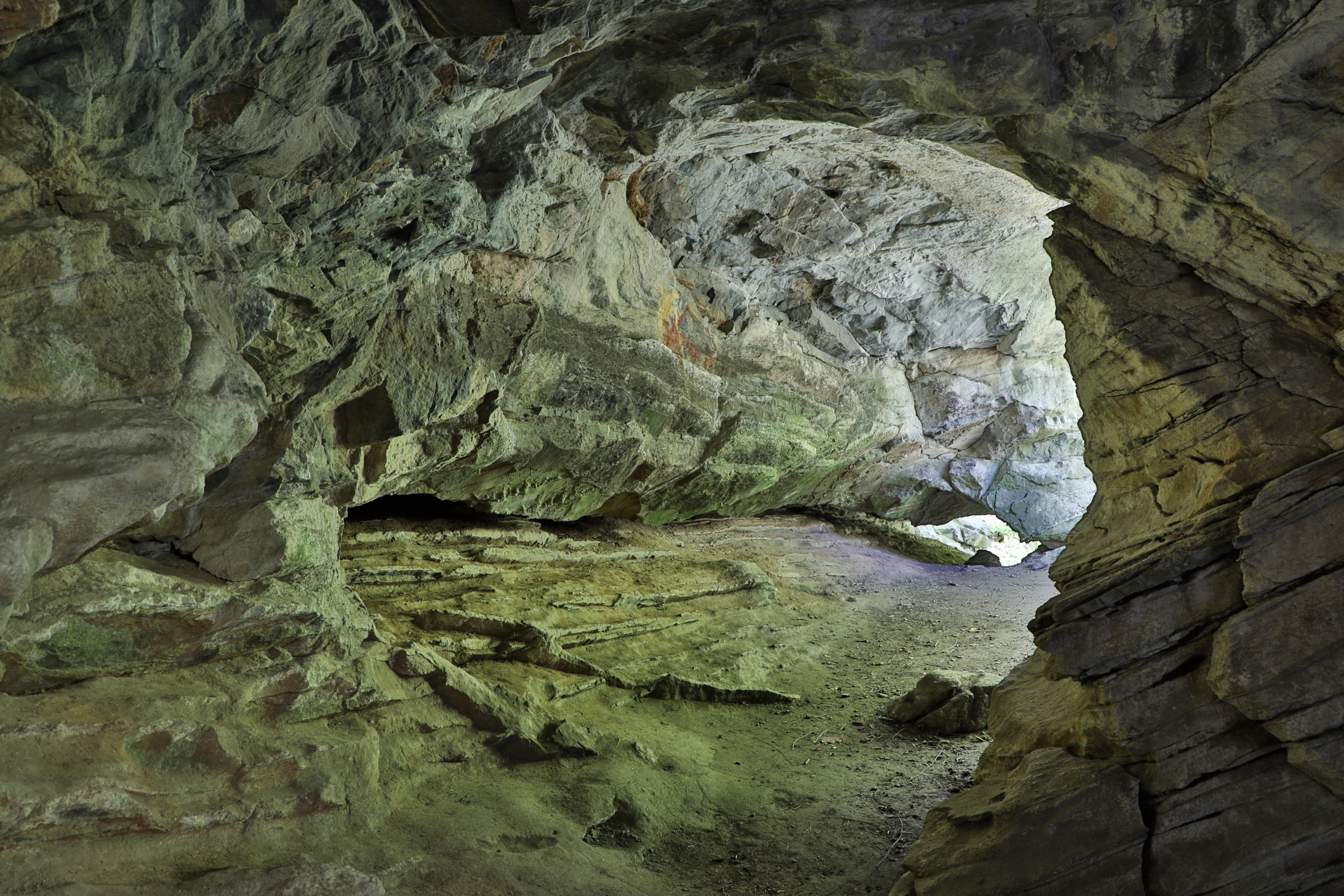
- Gudenus Cave interior

- Location in Austria
- 48.44682°N 15.3956°E
- Periods: Paleolithic
- Location: near Lichtenau im Waldviertel
- Region: Lower Austria

The Gudenus Cave (German: Gudenushöhle) is an archaeological site near the city of Krems in north-eastern Austria. It is noted for its fossils and remains of Palaeolithic human settlers.

== Description ==
The Gudenus Cavern is situated 20 km (12 mi) northwest of the city of Krems, in the valley of the Little Krems, not far from Willendorf, in Lower Austria. The site is close to the River Danube. The cave is 22 m (72 ft) long with a width of 2 to 3 m (6.6 to 9.8 ft) and is situated 7.5 m (25 ft) above the level of the stream.

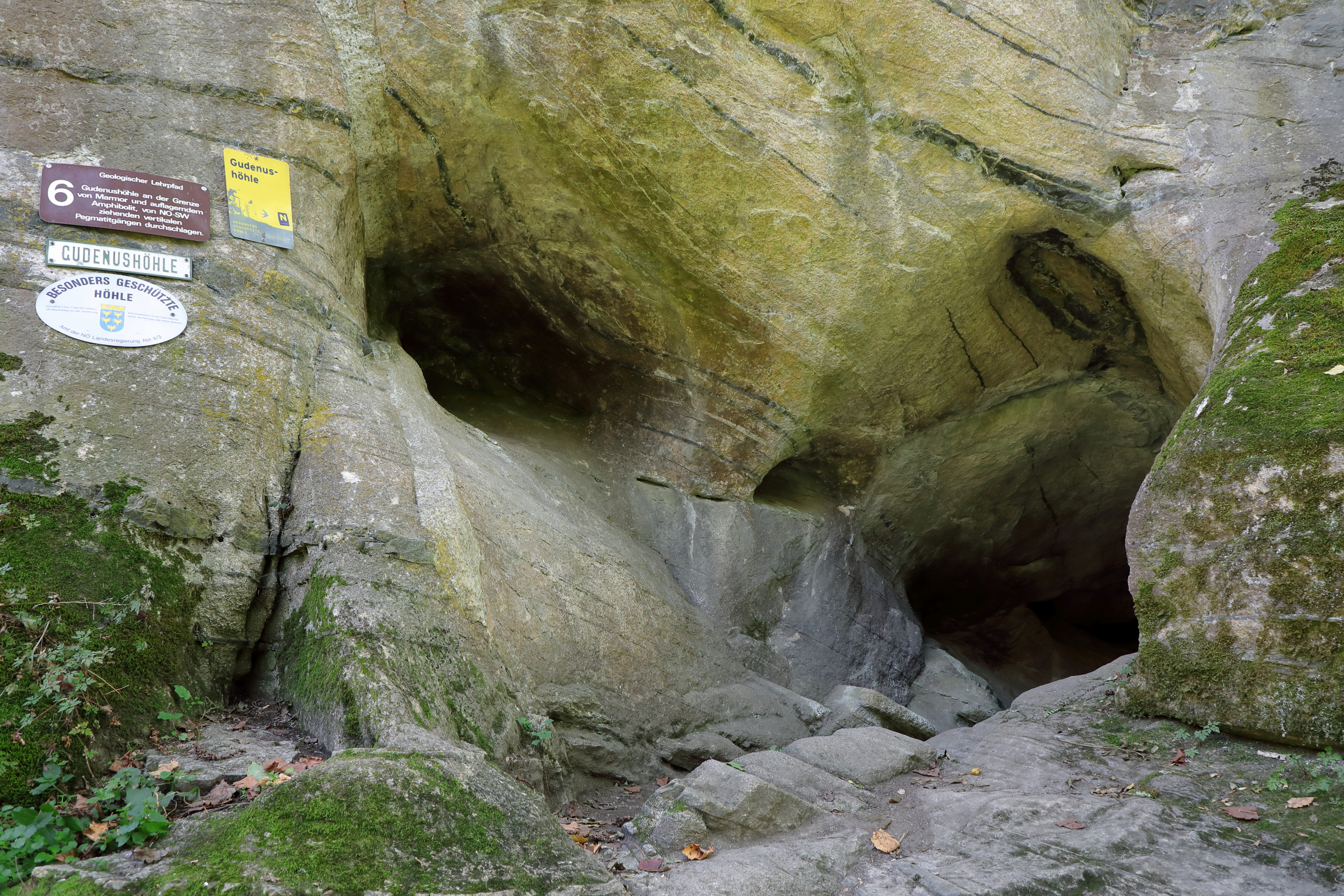
Left entrance area

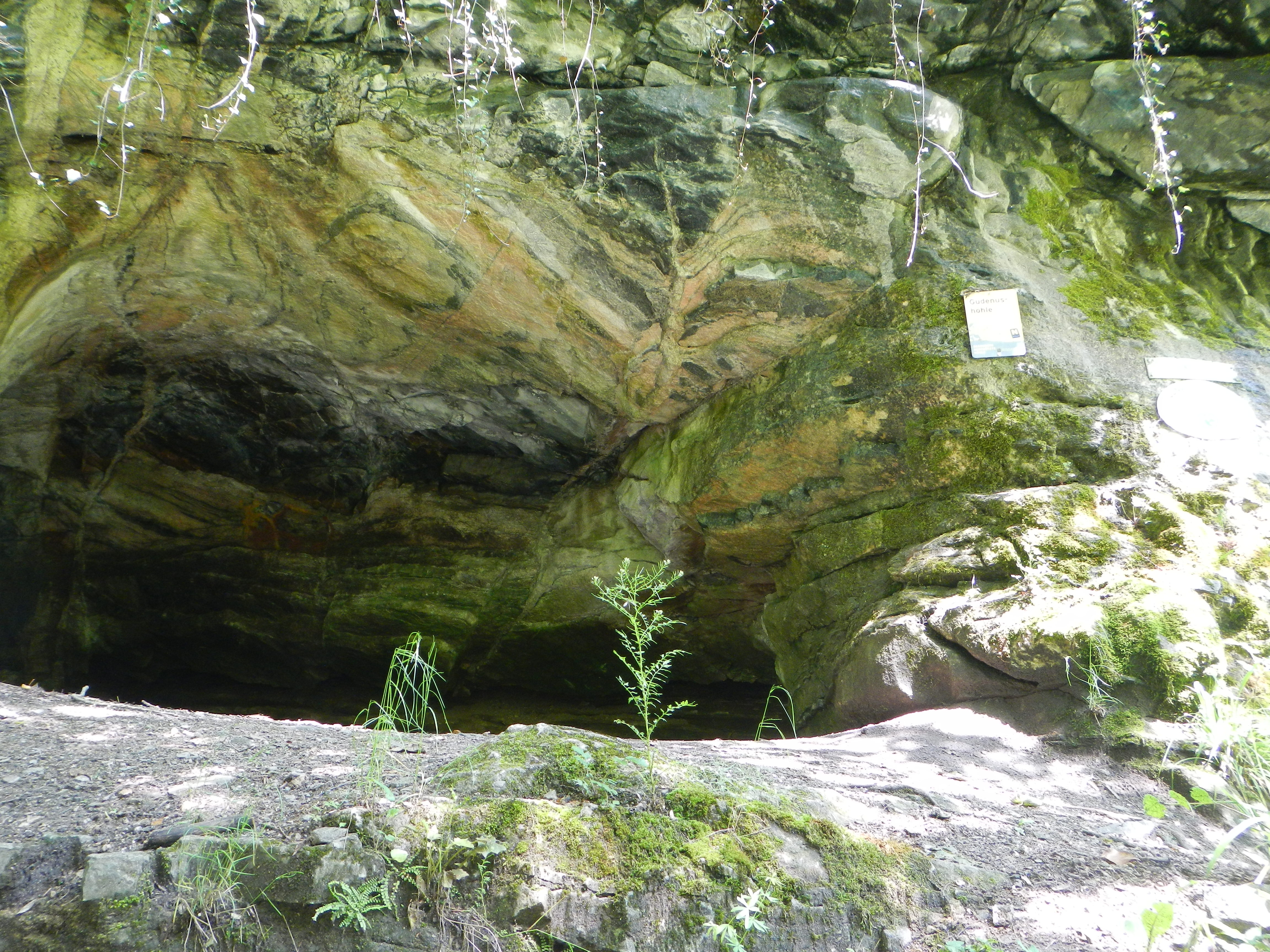
Right entrance area

== Paleontology ==
The archaeological deposit has yielded bones of numerous animals, including Woolly mammoth, Woolly rhinoceros, Aurochs, Chamois, Reindeer, and Red deer. Human artifacts include numerous flint implements beginning with the Mousterian (i.e. Neanderthals) of the Middle Paleolithic, although there is no certainty as to the dating. There is also an Upper Palaeolithic, Magdalenian, assemblage including an engraved reindeer bone, and a fragment of a bone flute dated to about 16,000–10,000 BCE.
