= Benno Mengele =

Austrian electrical engineer

Benno Mengele (11 December 1898 in Zwettl, Lower Austria – 15 September 1971 in Vienna) was an Austrian electrical engineer.

Mengele studied from 1918 to 1923 at the Vienna University of Technology and worked from 1922 at the Austrian Siemens-Schuckert. He developed protective earthing and fault current, and in 1929, he and Gustav Markt developed the overhead power line (bundle conductors) for high-voltage and ultrahigh-voltage power transmission. He also built the first hydrogen-cooled three-phase motor in Austria. In 1965, he was awarded an honorary doctorate from the Vienna University of Technology.
