= Florian Metz =

Austrian footballer and coach

Personal information
- Date of birth: 18 September 1985 (age 41)
- Place of birth: Zwettl, Austria
- Height: 1.82 m (6 ft 0 in)
- Position: Defender

Team information
- Current team: Austria Wien (physiotherapist)

Youth career
- FSA Hollabrunn
- 1992–1998: SC Zwettl
- 1998–2004: Austria Wien

Senior career*
Years	Team	Apps	(Gls)
2004–2009	Austria Wien	68	(0)
2005–2009	Austria Wien II	14	(0)
2009–2012	LASK	48	(3)
2012–2013	Liefering	1	(0)
2013–2018	SC Zwettl		

Managerial career
- 2016: SC Zwettl (caretaker)
- 2018–: Austria Wien (physiotherapist)
- * Club domestic league appearances and goals

Florian Metz (born 18 September 1985) is an Austrian football coach and former player who works a physiotherapist with Austria Wien. A defender, he notably played for Austria Wien and LASK.

== Club career ==
=== Austria Wien ===
Metz is one of the first graduates of the Frank Stronach Academy. He played at the Austria Wien first team from 2004 until 2009, when he left for LASK Linz.

== Career statistics ==
Appearances and goals by club, season and competition
Club	Season	League			Austrian Cup		Europe		Total	
Club	Season	Division	Apps	Goals	Apps	Goals	Apps	Goals	Apps	Goals
Austria Wien	2004–05	Austrian Bundesliga	10	0	2	0	5	0	17	0
Austria Wien	2005–06	Austrian Bundesliga	12	0	2	0	0	0	14	0
Austria Wien	2006–07	Austrian Bundesliga	17	0	2	0	6	0	25	0
Austria Wien	2007–08	Austrian Bundesliga	22	0	0	0	4	0	26	0
Austria Wien	2008–09	Austrian Bundesliga	7	0	0	0	0	0	7	0
Austria Wien	Total		68	0	6	0	15	0	89	0
Austria Wien II	2005–06	2. Liga	3	0	0	0	–		3	0
Austria Wien II	2006–07	2. Liga	4	0	0	0	–		4	0
Austria Wien II	2008–09	2. Liga	7	0	5	2	–		12	2
Austria Wien II	Total		14	0	5	2	0	0	19	2
LASK	2009–10	Austrian Bundesliga	29	3	2	0	—		31	3
LASK	2010–11	Austrian Bundesliga	16	0	2	0	—		18	0
LASK	2011–12	First League	3	0	1	0	—		4	0
LASK	Total		48	3	5	0	0	0	53	3
Career total			130	3	16	2	15	0	161	5

== Honours ==
- Austrian Football Bundesliga: 2006
- Austrian Cup: 2005, 2006, 2007, 2009
