= Traisental =

Austrian wine region

Traisental is an Austrian wine region. To the south of Krems lies Herzogenburg, at the centre of Traisen Valley, which was designated as a wine district in 1995. Mostly Grüner Veltliner is grown in this region, which is made into a fresh style for drinking young. In 2006, the origin classification Traisental DAC was introduced for Grüner Veltliner and Riesling wines from the district which satisfy specific criteria.
