= Hahndorf Hill Winery =

Vineyard in South Australia

Coordinates: 35.02155°S 138.81252°E

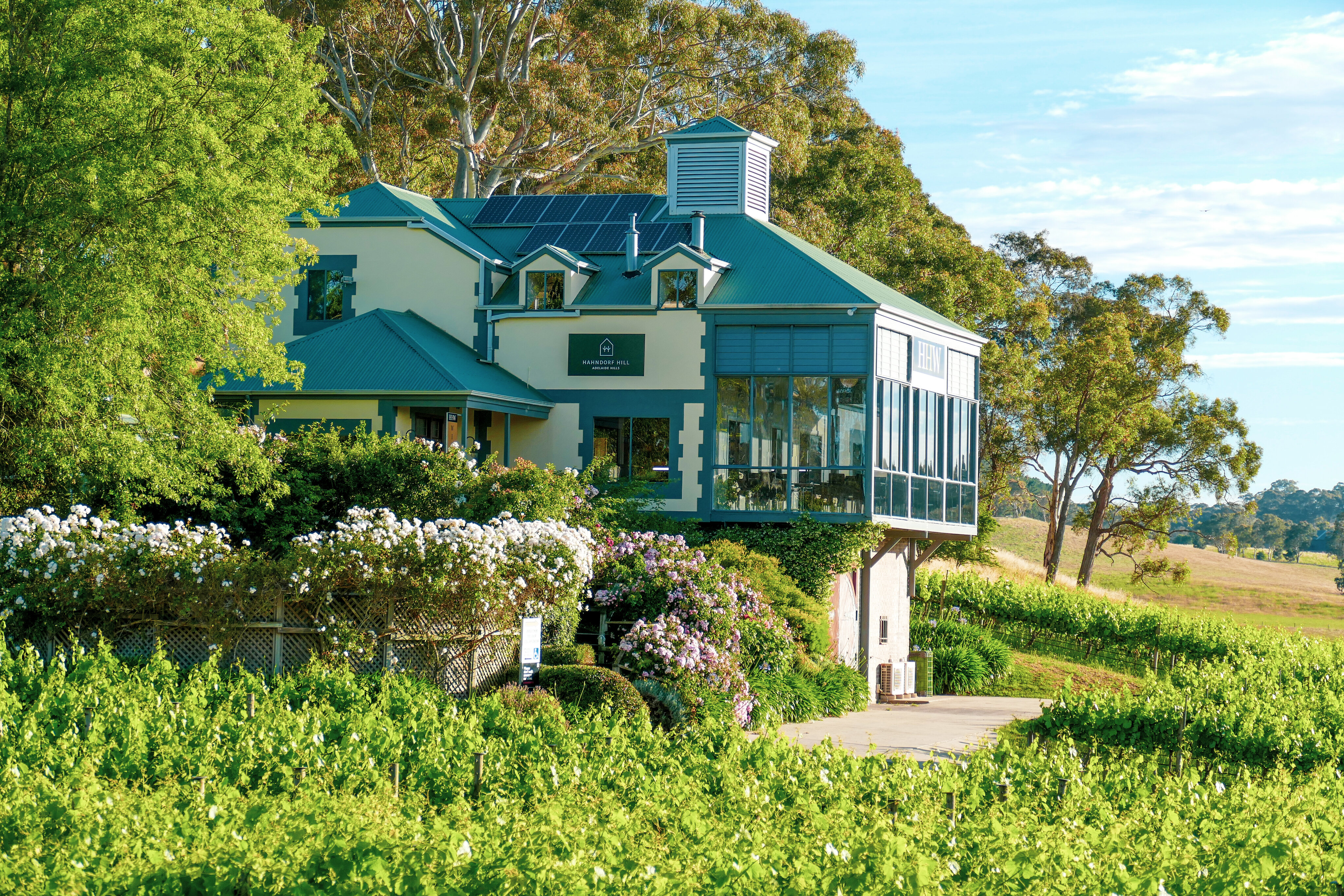
Hahndorf Hill Winery is set in the cool-climate Adelaide Hills

Hahndorf Hill Winery, also known as HHW, is a boutique vineyard situated adjacent to the historic, German-heritage village of Hahndorf, South Australia, in the Adelaide Hills wine region.

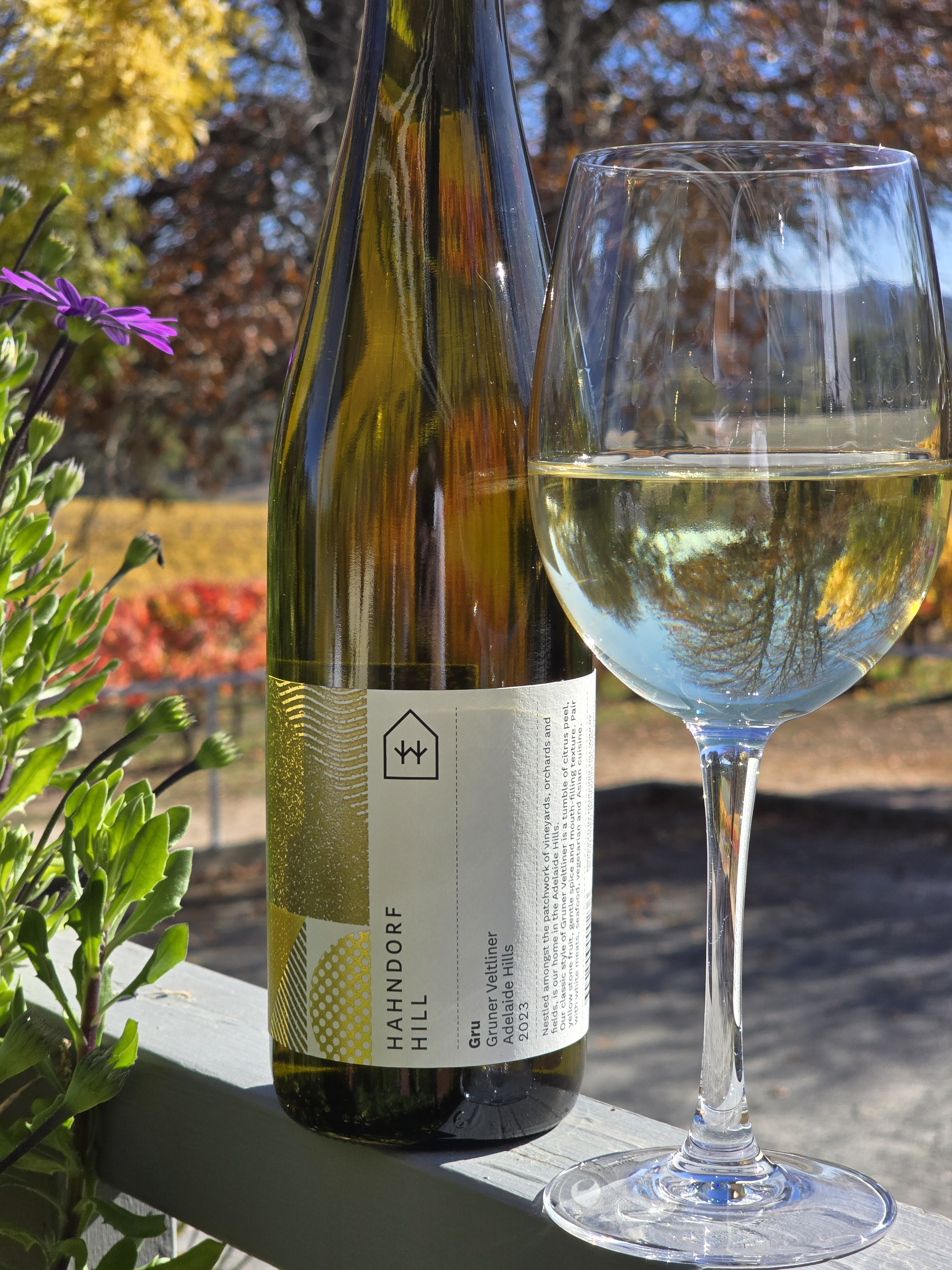
Hahndorf Hill produces four styles of Gruner Veltliner - Classic, Reserve, New World and Dessert/ Sweet

Larry Jacobs and Marc Dobson acquired the Hahndorf Hill property in 2002 and subsequently made considerable changes to the vineyard plantings, including the promotion and development of Austrian grape varieties such as Grüner Veltliner, Blaufränkisch and Zweigelt. A fourth Austrian variety, St. Laurent, was planted at the Hahndorf Hill vineyard in 2015.

From June 2025, custodianship of Hahndorf Hill will be handed from Larry and Marc to the families behind Wirra Wirra, to continue making cool-climate Adelaide Hills wine under the Hahndorf Hill label.

After importing three different clones of Grüner Veltliner from Austria into Australia in 2006, and a further three clones/clonal selections in 2009, Hahndorf Hill Winery became the first producer of Grüner Veltliner in South Australia in 2010. It was Australia's first producer of the Austrian red varieties, Blaufrankisch, Zweigelt and Saint Laurent. In 2020 Hahndorf Hill produced a cuvée of Saint Laurent, Blaufrankisch and Zweigelt called ‘Benediction’.

In 2022 it produced an authentic field blend called ‘Brother Nature’, comprising 12 white grape varieties interplanted together in one block and co-harvested and co-fermented in the Gemischter Satz style.

Other grape varieties grown at Hahndorf Hill include Trollinger, and Shiraz. Hahndorf Hill also produces a Pinot Grigio made from grapes grown by other Adelaide Hills vignerons.
