= Langenlois =

- Municipality
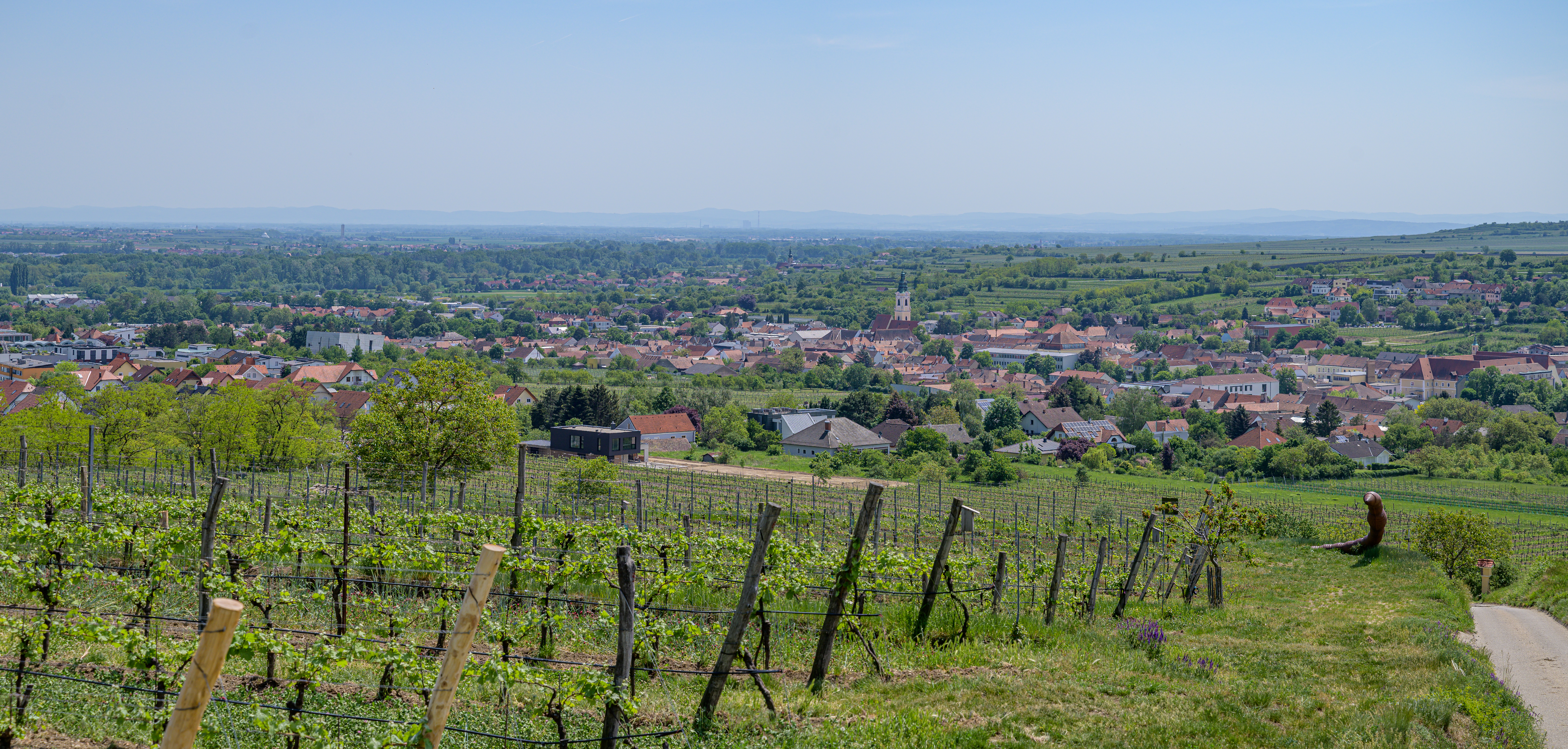
- Langenlois seen from the northwest

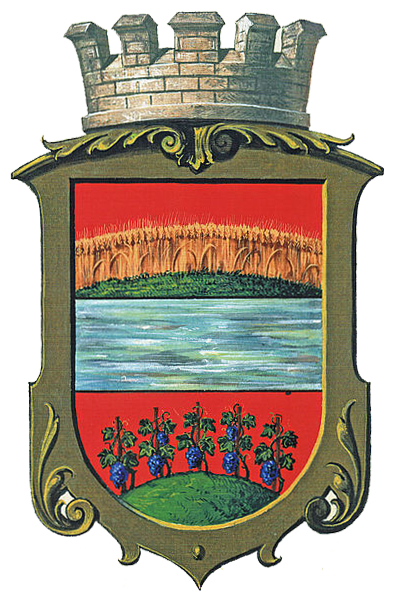
- Coat of arms

- Location within Austria
- Coordinates: 48°28′N 15°41′E
- Country: Austria
- State: Lower Austria
- District: Krems-Land District

Government
  - Mayor: Harald Leopold (ÖVP)

Area
  - Total: 67.09 km^{2} (25.90 sq mi)
- Elevation: 219 m (719 ft)

Population (2018-01-01)
  - Total: 7,609
  - Density: 113.4/km^{2} (293.7/sq mi)
- Time zone: UTC+1 (CET)
  - Summer (DST): UTC+2 (CEST)
- Postal code: 3550
- Area code: 02734
- Website: https://www.langenlois.gv.at/

Langenlois (German pronunciation: [ˈlaŋənlɔʏs]) is a town at the Kamp river in the Kamptal, district of Krems-Land in the Austrian state of Lower Austria. Famous for its wine production, it is also home to the Loisium, a centre celebrating and advertising the local wine and built by the American deconstructionist architect Steven Holl.

== Population ==
Historical population
| Year | Pop. | ±% |
|---|---|---|
| 1869 | 7,057 | — |
| 1880 | 7,211 | +2.2% |
| 1890 | 7,285 | +1.0% |
| 1900 | 8,059 | +10.6% |
| 1910 | 8,456 | +4.9% |
| 1923 | 7,495 | −11.4% |
| 1934 | 7,497 | +0.0% |
| 1939 | 7,243 | −3.4% |
| 1951 | 7,606 | +5.0% |
| 1961 | 7,260 | −4.5% |
| 1971 | 7,071 | −2.6% |
| 1981 | 6,443 | −8.9% |
| 1991 | 6,367 | −1.2% |
| 2001 | 6,875 | +8.0% |
| 2011 | 7,283 | +5.9% |
| 2021 | 7,469 | +2.6% |
