= Kamp (river) =

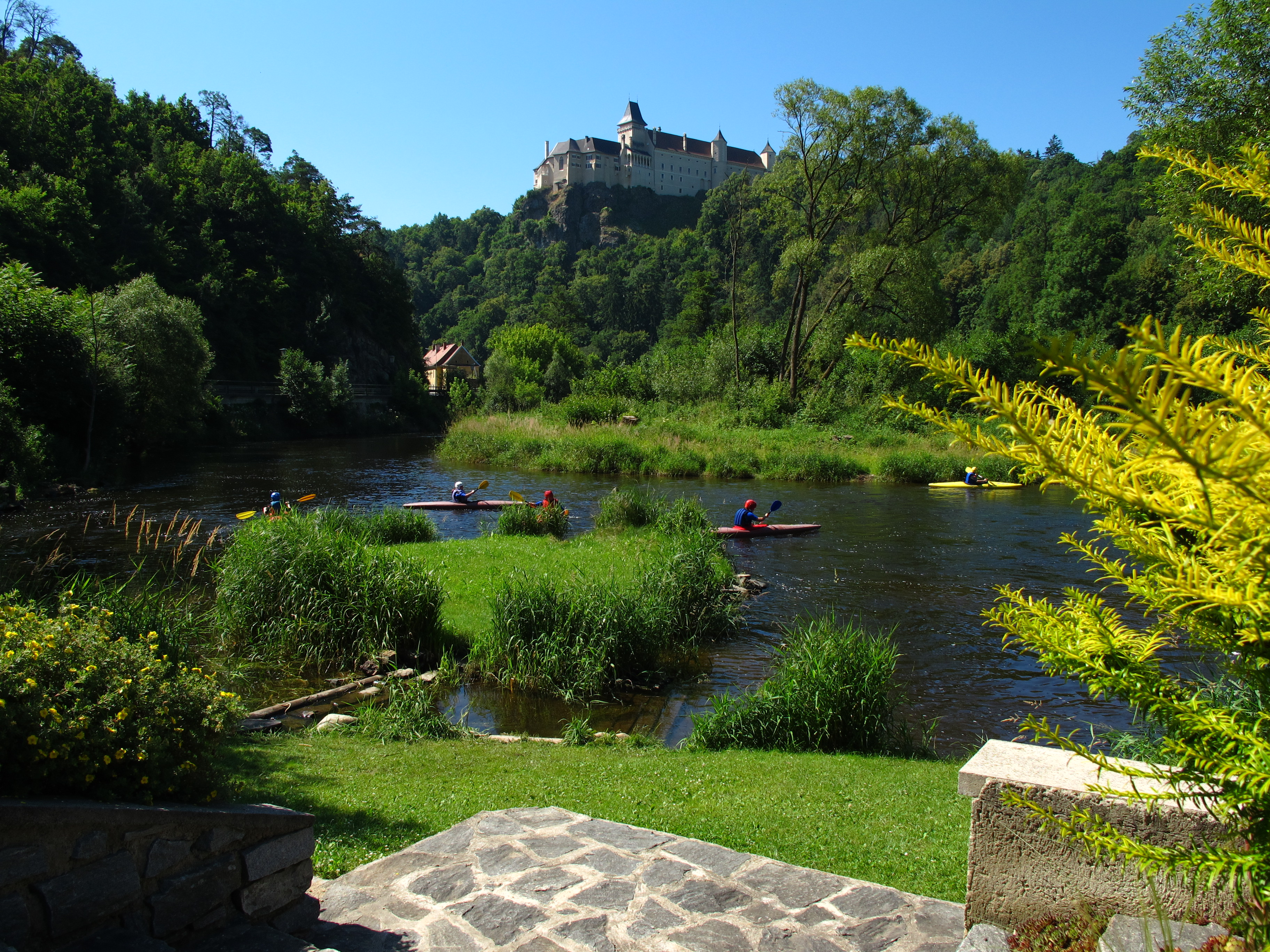
- The Kamp near Rosenburg castle

Location
- Country: Austria

Physical characteristics
- Source
  - location: Waldviertel
- Mouth: Danube
  - coordinates: 48°23′07″N 15°50′31″E
- Length: 168.4 km (104.6 mi)
- Basin size: 2,177 km^{2} (841 sq mi)

Basin features
- Progression: Danube→ Black Sea
- Tributaries
  - right: Krems

The Kamp (German pronunciation: [kamp]) is a 168-kilometre-long (104 mi) river in northern Austria, left tributary of the Danube. Its drainage basin is 2,177 km^{2} (841 sq mi).

The source of the Kamp is on the border of Lower Austria and Upper Austria, near the town Liebenau, in the Mühlviertel. It flows generally east through Rappottenstein (where it receives its tributary Kleine Kamp), Zwettl, Krumau am Kamp, Gars am Kamp and Langenlois. Most of the southern part of the valley belongs to the Kamptal vine region. Before the construction of the hydropower plant in the Danube at Altenwörth in the 1970s, the Kamp flowed into the Danube near Grafenwörth, east of Krems an der Donau. Its discharge point was moved to Altenwörth, and the waters of the river Krems, that used to be a direct tributary of the Danube, were redirected to the Kamp.
