= Kremstal =

Austrian wine region

Kremstal is an Austrian wine region. Located downstream of the Wachau, the region is centred on the town of Krems. The climate is relatively warmer as the valley broadens, facilitating increased red wine production, while the region otherwise shares many characteristics with the Wachau.
