= Kamptal =

Kamptal is an Austrian wine, tourism, culture and health region located in Waldviertel, Lower Austria. It is named by the river Kamp.

To the north of Krems lies Langenlois, which is the main vine-town of Kamptal, the valley of the river Kamp. The sandstone slopes are so steep that only a thin layer of soil is retained. Exposure to the sun is high. Riesling thrives on these steep slopes; closer to the Danube the valley broadens and more red grapes are grown.

Another prominent town in the Kamptal is Gars am Kamp.

== Notable wineries ==
- Schloss Gobelsburg

== See also ==
- Dialog im Kamptal, non-partisan initiative
