= Chemin des Longs Sillons =

Historic walls in Seine-et-Marne, France

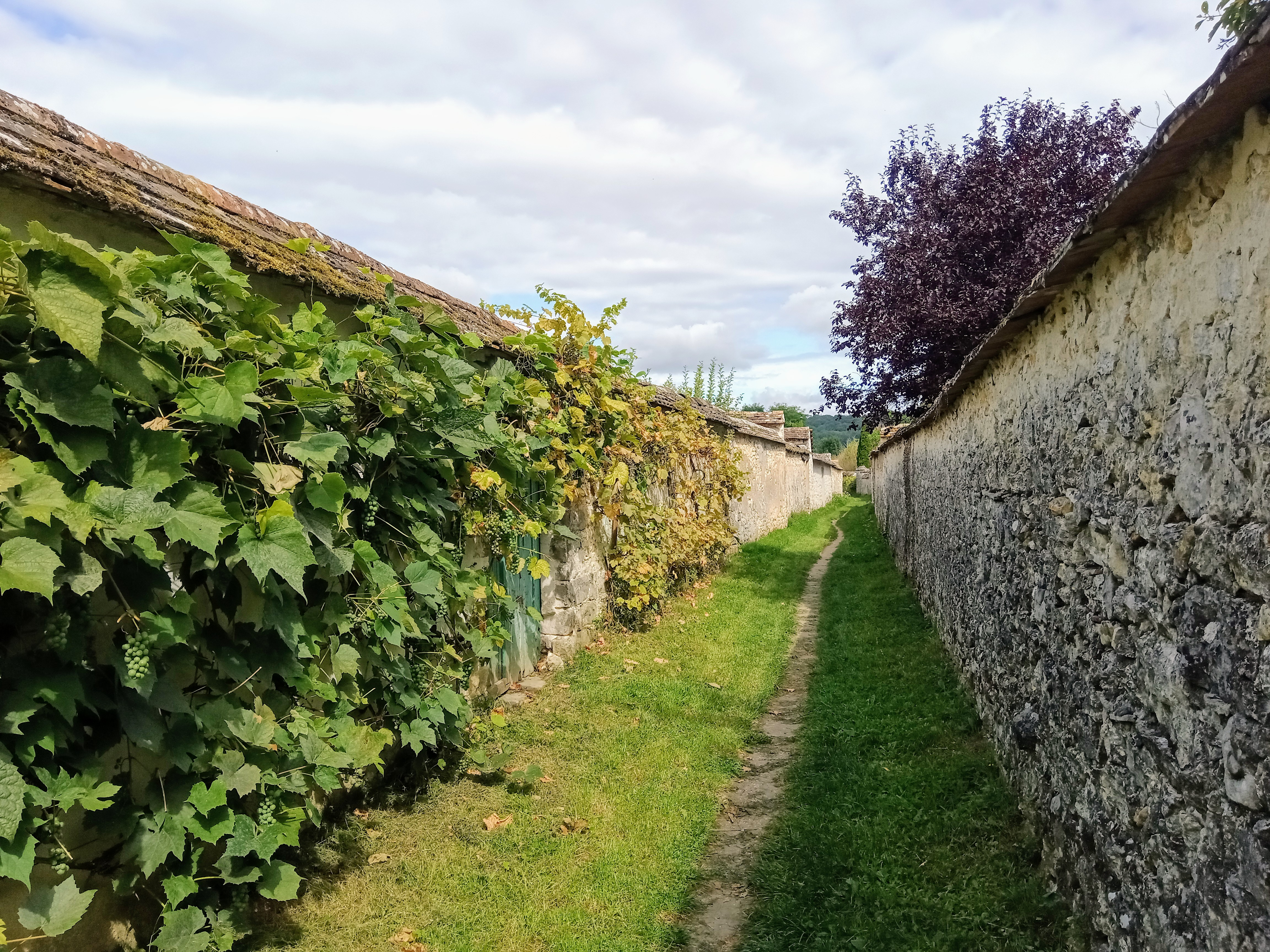
- Le chemin des Longs Sillons
- Interactive map of Chemin des Longs Sillons
- Location: Thomery, Seine-et-Marne
- Coordinates: 48°24′21″N 2°47′07″E
- Type: Vineyard walls
- Inauguration date: 1900

The Chemin des Longs Sillons is a group of high walls specific to the commune of Thomery in the Seine-et-Marne region, built in the first third of the 18th century to grow table grapes of a local variety known as “Chasselas de Thomery”. Since 1993, they have been listed as monument historique (MH) in the Seine-et-Marne MH list.

== Description ==
Most of the village of Thomery and the former commune of By now merged with Thomery, are crisscrossed by high walls, spaced 9 to 10 meters apart and up to 100 meters long, which follow the natural slope of the Thomery hillside down to the Seine. These 2.50 to 3-meter-high walls, made of stones held together with earth mortar, were erected for Thomery's particular espalier grape-growing technique, to restore as much heat as possible to the vines grown in this very northerly area for table grapes.

The Chemin des Longs Sillons is a public footpath 645 meters long and 3 to 5 meters wide, lined with these high grape walls, winding between the private gardens of the lieux-dits des Longs-Sillons, des Merisiers-Coquins, des Rentières, and des Folies. There is also another path of this type, but not listed, called the “sentier rural des Grands-Clos”, in the lower part of Thomery, running alongside the rue du 4-Septembre.

== History ==
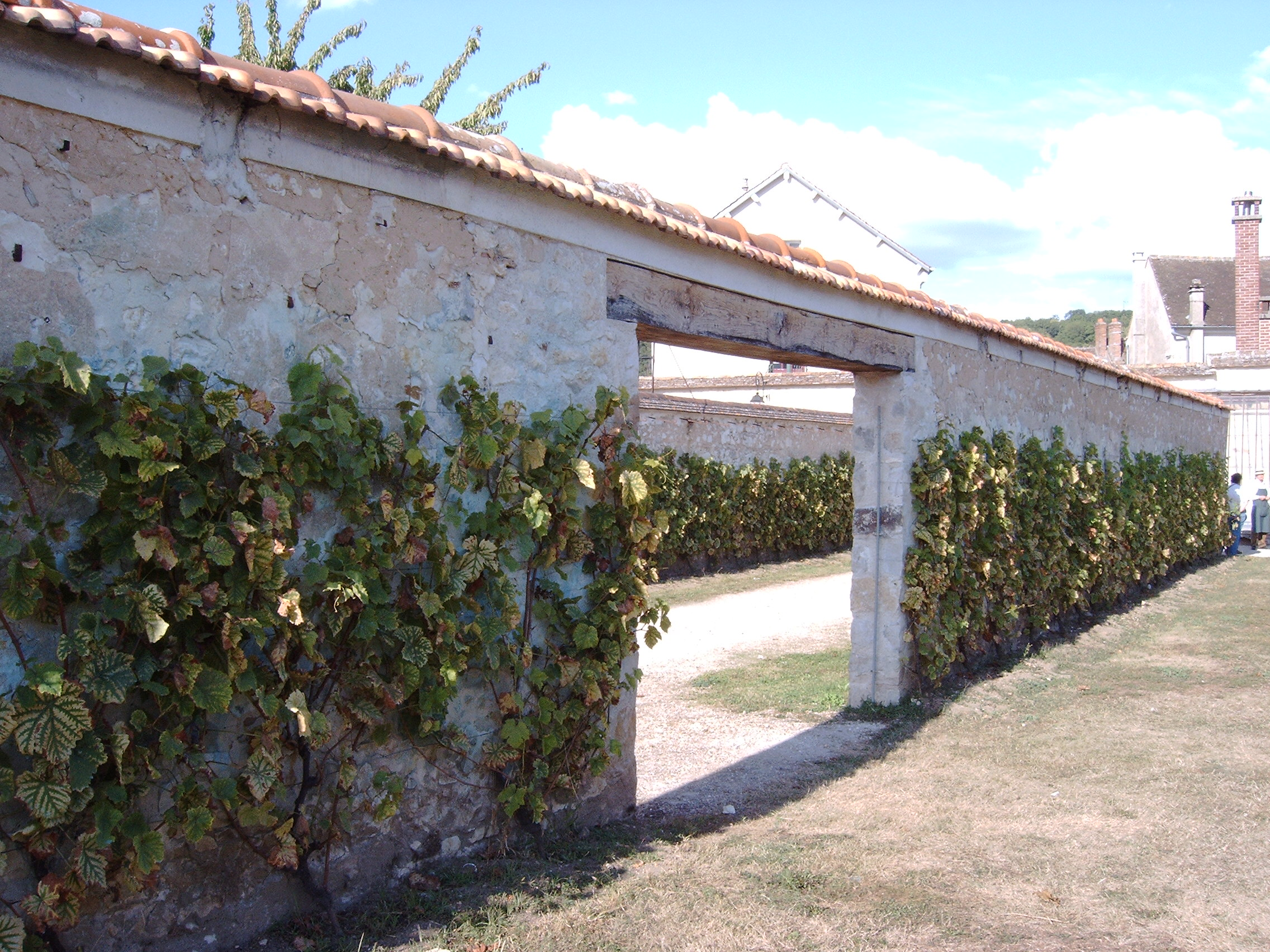
A modern-day Thomeryon wall with Chasselas.

The first walls were built around 1730, followed by a second major wave in 1840 with the success of vine growing and the increase in grape production in the second half of the nineteenth century. At their peak around 1850, these walls totaled more than 250 km in length, with vineyards covering more than 205 hectares. Today, however, they are far fewer in number and the vast majority of them have no vines, serving as cadastral boundaries between the plots of private homes built in the 20th century with the decline in Chasselas production.

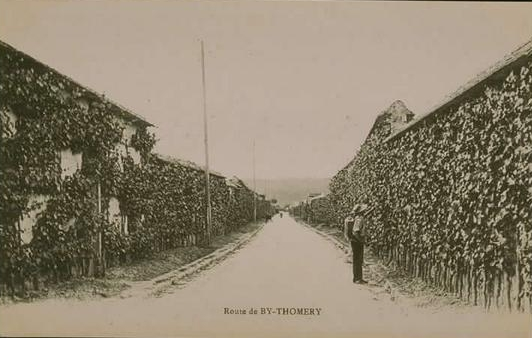
Walls in By around 1900-1910.

To preserve this rural agricultural and technical heritage, on May 5, 1993, the Monuments Historiques registered the walls within the perimeter defined by rue de la République, rue Victor-Hugo, rue de By and rue des Montforts as a remarkable agricultural ensemble, representing a rectangle of approximately 500 meters in length and 150 meters in width. For the most part, they are on private property, but the commune has created a public passageway called “Chemin des Longs Sillons”, starting near Thomery town hall and running through the middle of this perimeter from rue de la République to rue de By over a total length of 645 meters.

== See also ==
- Peach wall
- Chasselas de Thomery
- Monument historique
