= Latreille (surname) =

Latreille is a French surname. Notable people with the surname include:

- Francis Latreille, French American artist and photographer
- Phil Latreille (1938–2025), Canadian ice hockey player
- Pierre André Latreille (1762–1833), French zoologist

== See also ==
- Treille (disambiguation)
