= Chasselas de Thomery =

Grape variety grown in Seine-et-Marne, France

- Grape (Vitis)
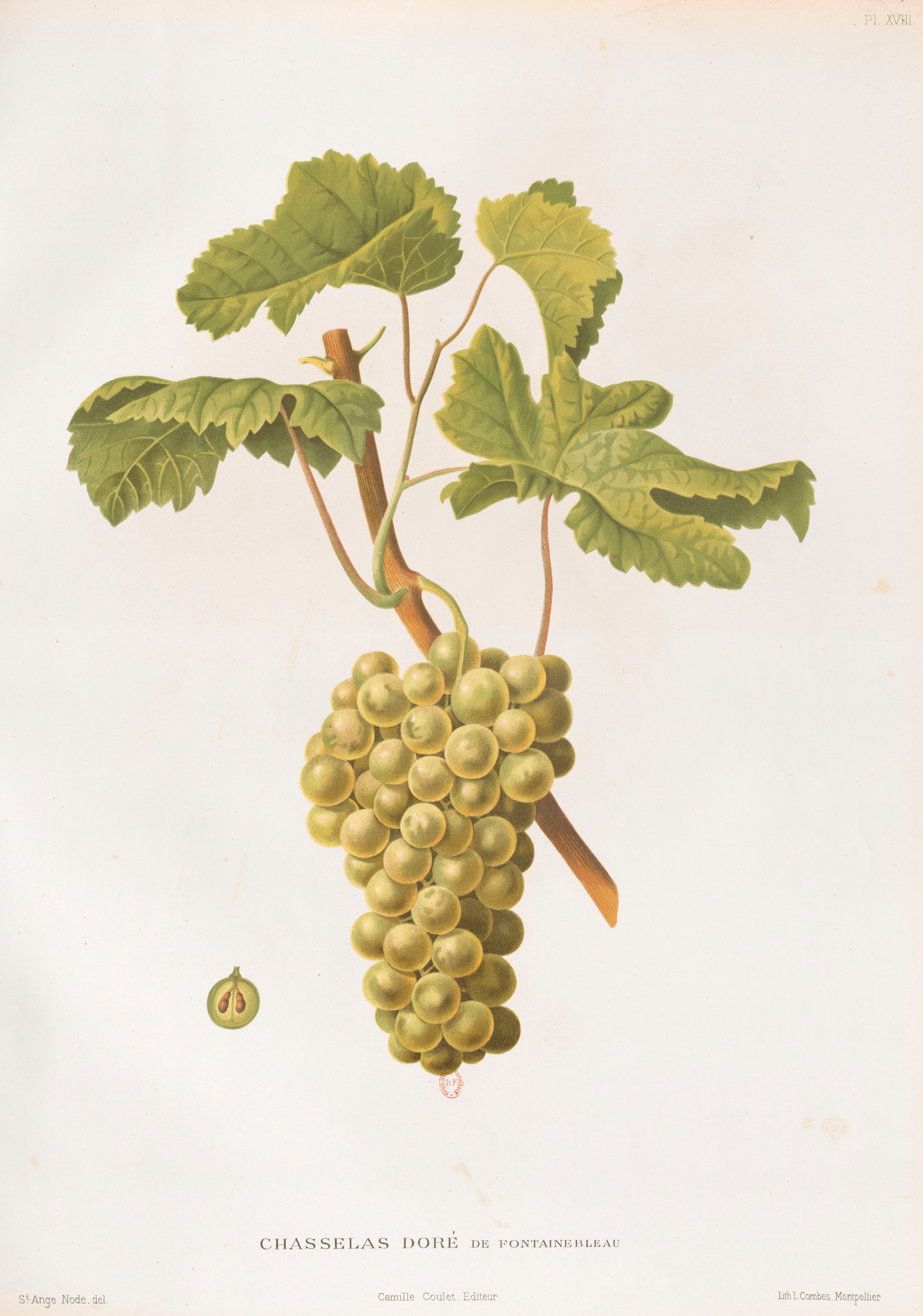
- Lithography of the chasselas de Thomery or chasselas doré de Fontainebleau.
- Species: Chasselas, Vitis vinifera
- Origin: France
- Notable regions: Seine-et-Marne region, Thomery village

Chasselas de Thomery, also known as Chasselas doré de Fontainebleau, is a Chasselas grape variety grown in the village of Thomery in the Seine-et-Marne region.

This table grape, closely related to Chasselas de Moissac, has been produced and preserved using unique, traditional local methods since 1730. The special features of this crop, located in a very northerly zone for a table grape, are based on the development of espalier vine-growing techniques on walls, and optimization of fruit ripening through very specific pruning of the vines known as "Cordon Charmeux", as well as specific methods for preserving in fruitiers the fresh bunches picked in October and marketed until May of the following year.

Chasselas de Thomery, whose production peaked at the beginning of the 20th century, was renowned and appreciated between the wars, when it was considered a luxury grape to be enjoyed throughout the winter and spring. Its cultivation and marketing declined sharply from the late 1930s onwards, and today it is only grown traditionally and ornamentally by a few private individuals in the commune.

== History ==
=== Origins ===
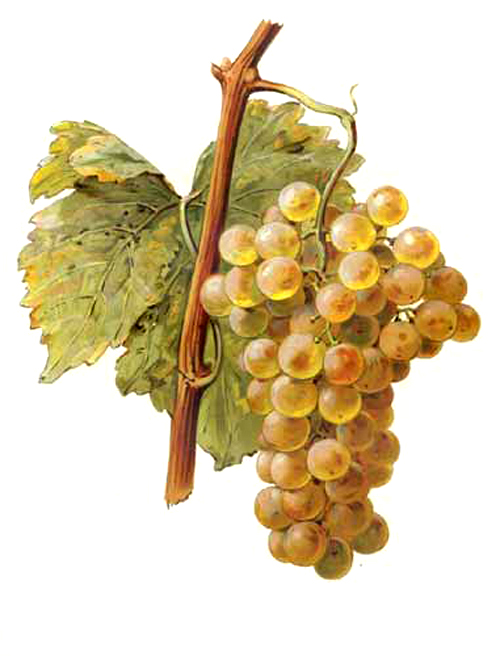
Chasselas doré de Fontainebleau.

Chasselas de Thomery, also known as Chasselas doré de Fontainebleau, has a secondary origin, either in the Cahors region (it is closely related to Chasselas de Moissac), or in Piedmont in Italy, although it is not yet possible to say which hypothesis prevails over the other. On the other hand, in the current state of scientific knowledge, this variety is identical to Chasselas B, whose primary origin is the region on the borders of France, Italy, and Switzerland, probably in the geographical area known as the arc lémanique, which also includes the village of Chasselas, through which the original variety passed between the 16th and 17th centuries. As a result, Chasselas, which has long been classified as a proles orientalis variety, must now be considered a proles occidentalis, given the results of recent comparative genetic studies based on microsatellite sequence analysis of over 500 different grape varieties.

=== Establishment and development in Thomery ===
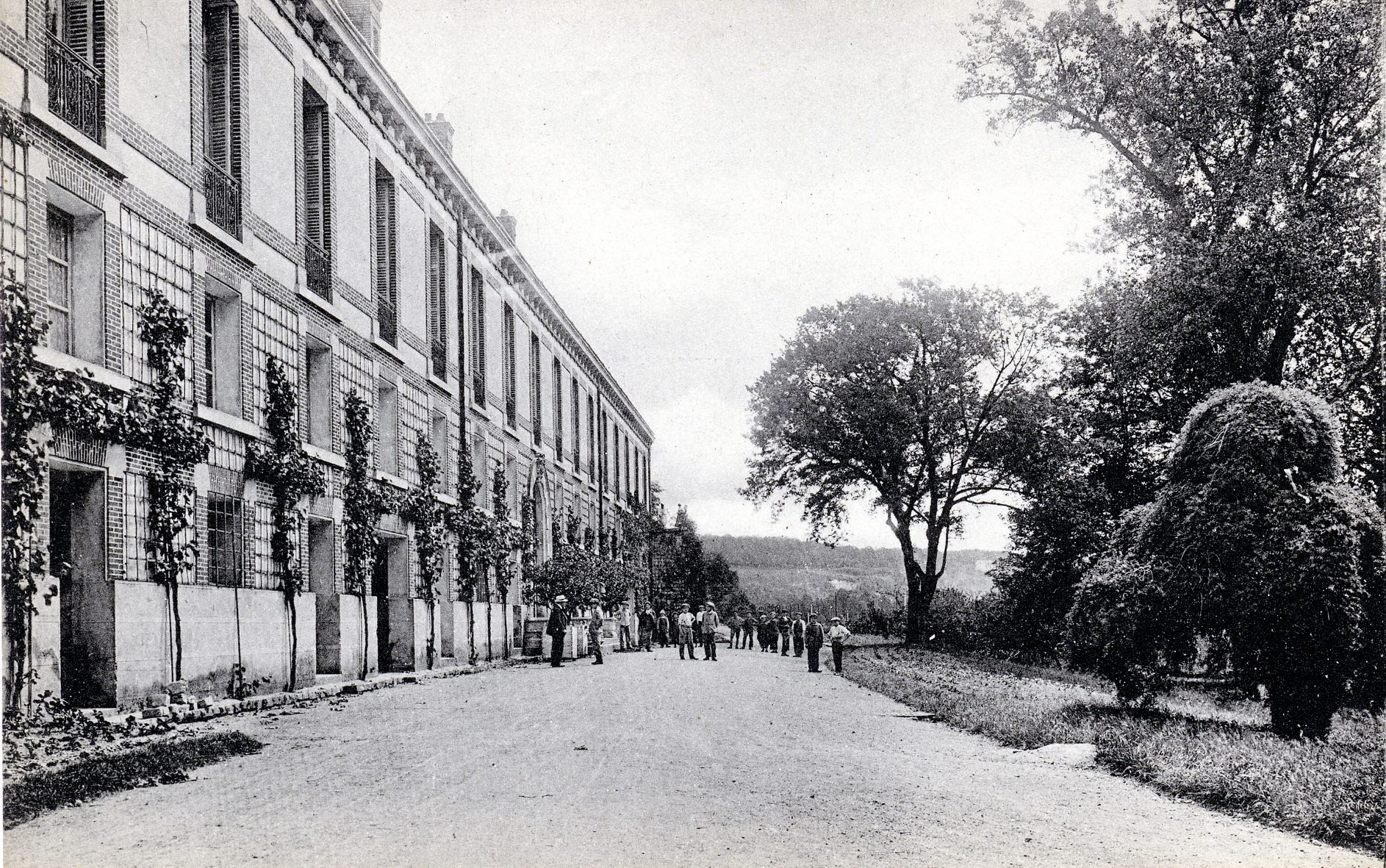
Les Pressoirs du Roy in Samoreau, circa 1900.

The Fontainebleau region was a vine-growing area long before the present-day viticulture of Thomery, as attested by the existence of the Pressoirs du Roy in Samoreau, built under Francis I in 1530, and the cultivation of vines along the 1,200-meter "treilles du Roi" on the south wall of the Château de Fontainebleau gardens. However, vine-growing was limited to court consumption, and did not extend beyond the royal orchards.

The sandy-clay soil of alluvial origin on the By hillside, although facing east and south-east, was nevertheless chosen by François Charmeux around 1730 as the site for the first chasselas vines (Note: The first wall was built in 1730 along what is now rue Gambetta in By. It can still be seen today.) grown on the "treilles du Roi" in Fontainebleau. This soil, a priori unfavorable to viticulture, combined with a northerly location not conducive to sunshine, could not intrinsically produce a wine of acceptable quality. However, with the Charmeux family's improvements in grape ripening techniques, the possibility of producing a high-quality table grape was demonstrated. Given the success of his small-scale production, Charmeux decided to build more high walls between 1730 and 1736. Vine-growing was initially very limited, involving only a handful of producers between 1750 and 1800, but expanded with a second wave of wall construction around 1840 and the optimization of production methods, culminating around 1842 in Thomery's 205 hectares of walled vineyards. At that time, Chasselas de Thomery was not the only grape variety grown along the walls, but also alongside the German Frankenthal grape variety from the town of the same name, which attracted consumers for the aesthetics of its bunches and growers for its ease of cultivation. Although many other trials were carried out, these were really the only two grape varieties grown on a large scale in the region. Between the walls are also developed monothematic fruit and vegetable crops, often on counter-paliers (i.e. supported by rows of wire).

=== Cultural boom ===
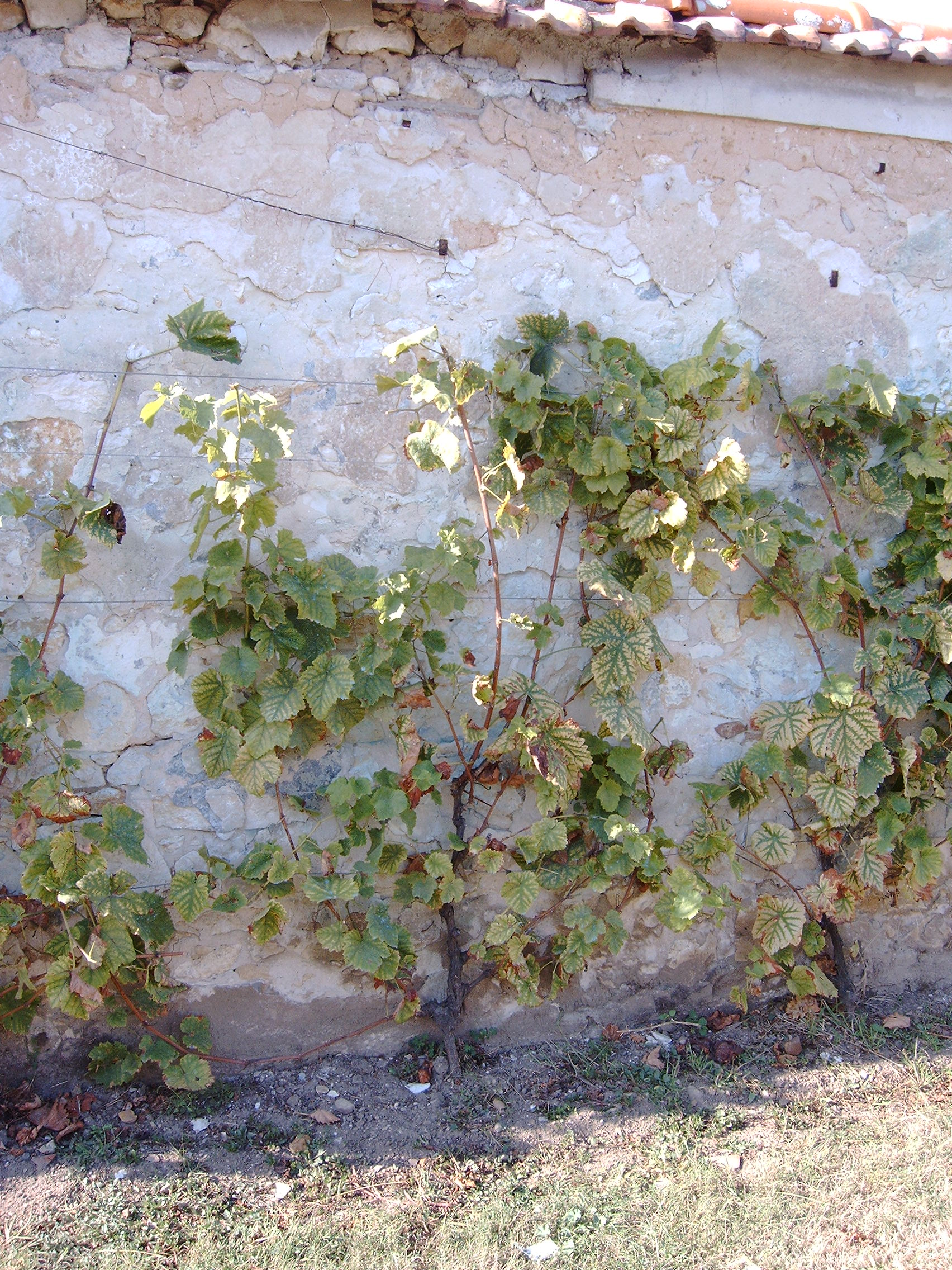
Chasselas de Thomery on a traditional wall.

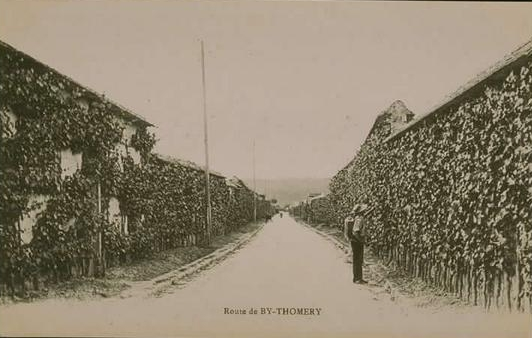
Chasselas walls in By around 1900.

The spread of Chasselas de Thomery cultivation was due to a second technical advance around 1850. Baptiste-Rose Charmeux perfected a new method of preserving bunches of grapes, after harvesting, in small bottles filled with water, which were then placed in a temperature-controlled grape chamber. The process was patented in 1877. This method of preservation kept the grapes absolutely fresh for several months, generally until Christmas and Easter, and even until May. It was perfected in Thomery, then adopted in other regions, and used without interruption until the 1970s. Around 1880, Étienne Salomon successfully experimented with a process for preserving grapes in cold rooms at 0–2 °C (foreshadowing refrigerators), as well as with forcing in greenhouses, but these were not followed by widespread application. At the time, grapes were transported to Paris mainly by river from the small port of Thomery by the village's own inhabitants in flat-bottomed boats, called margotats, to the capital's fruit market.

In 1850, Thomery, like the rest of northern France, was hit by powdery mildew, which almost led to the collapse of greenhouse and trellised vineyards in the Île-de-France region. From June 1852 onwards, Thomeryon winegrowers began to sulphurize the green stems, thus saving their harvests. The phylloxera attack of 1890 did not seem to affect Thomery, but the arrondissement of Fontainebleau was declared phylloxera-affected and as such could no longer send vines or shoots out of its district, which was catastrophic for the sale of Chasselas de Thomery, which was sold with a piece of shoot, leading to a major crisis among growers. Downy mildew appeared in 1885, but was quickly contained by sulfating. Weather conditions in this very northern region also led to a severe loss of production, with a particularly severe frost in the winter of 1879.

For decades in the 19th century, Chasselas de Thomery Doré was exported throughout France as a luxury product, purchased by bourgeois families in Paris, notably at Fauchon, and throughout Europe as far afield as the Russian court. In his posthumous novel Bouvard et Pécuchet (1881), written between 1872 and 1880, Gustave Flaubert most probably refers to the Chasselas de Thomery when he has Pécuchet say:

"In St. Petersburg, during the winter, they pay one napoleon per bunch for grapes! It's a fine industry, you'll agree! And what does it cost? Care, manure, and ironing with a mop!!

In 1900, 12 tons of grapes out of the 700 tons produced that year were sold for export. In 1912, under the impetus of Georges-François Charmeux, a railway advertising executive and descendant of the first of the name, the Compagnie du chemin de fer de Paris à Orléans decided to implement a genuine policy of popularizing cultivation techniques and promoting Chasselas. Chasselas cultivation in Thomery reached its peak, with annual production of 800 tonnes on some 150 hectares and 250 km of walls. Noting the commercial success, the neighboring communes of Veneux-les-Sablons, Moret-sur-Loing, Champagne-sur-Seine (selling its grapes under the clever name of "Champagne grapes") and even Samoreau also decided to develop Chasselas cultivation.

=== Decline and survival ===
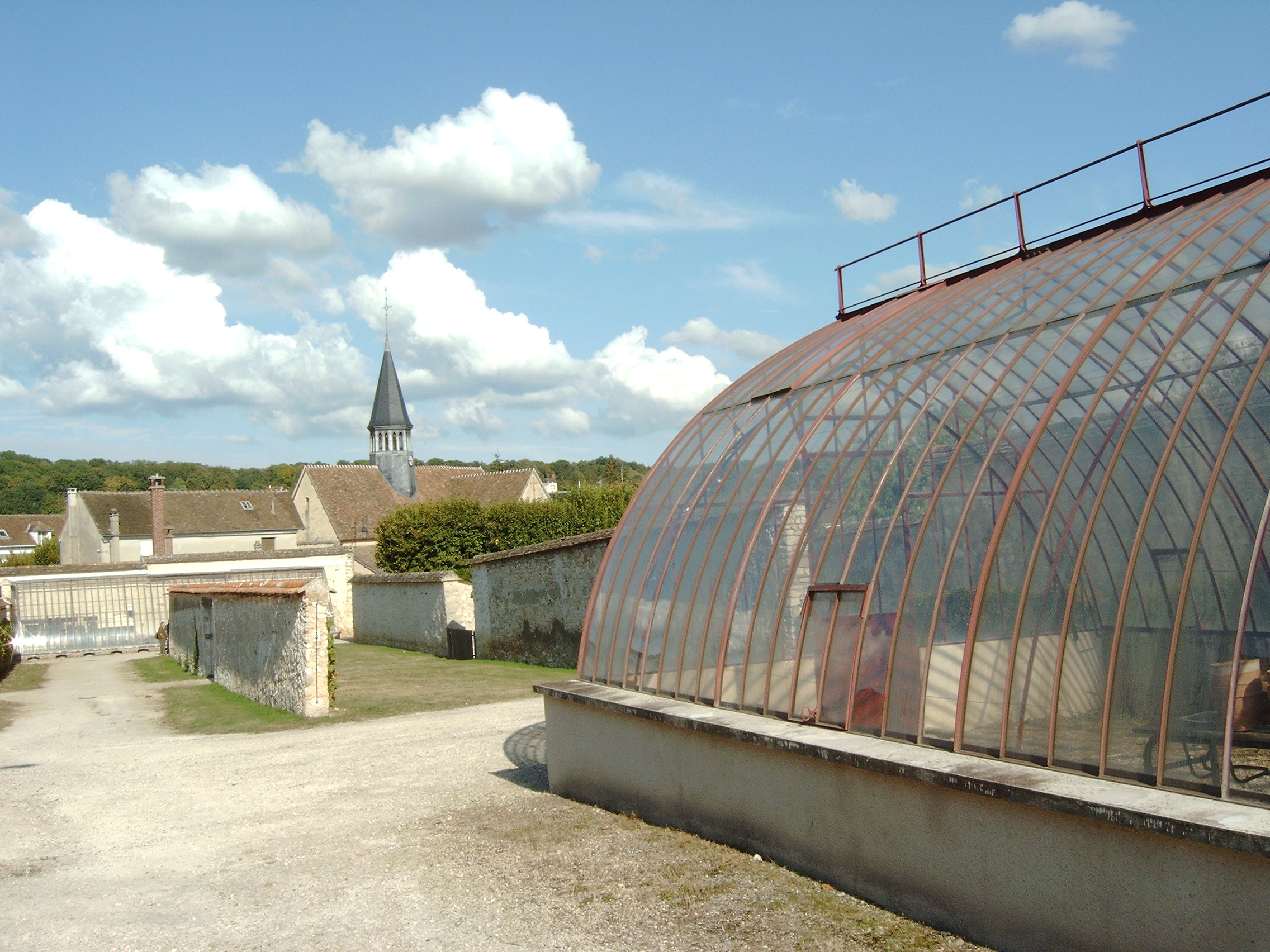
The Salomon greenhouses and Saint-Amand church in Thomery.

At the start of World War II, grape growing was in decline, due to the high labor costs involved in viticulture, national competition from Chasselas de Moissac and international competition from other grape varieties (from Italy and Spain), and the French population's attraction to other types of fruit now available at the same time of year (citrus, bananas, etc.). In 1941, the SNCF ceased to offer special rates for the transport of Chasselas de Thomery. In 1947, winegrowers, who had already diversified, notably by co-cultivating peaches, were hit by a wave of a parasitic insect of the peach tree known as the "peach moth", which often dealt a fatal blow to their operations. Despite the formation of a cooperative (called Les Vergers de Thomery) in 1960, the walls were increasingly abandoned or even destroyed to make way for large gardens for country houses, and market gardening and wine-growing ceased for good in 1970.

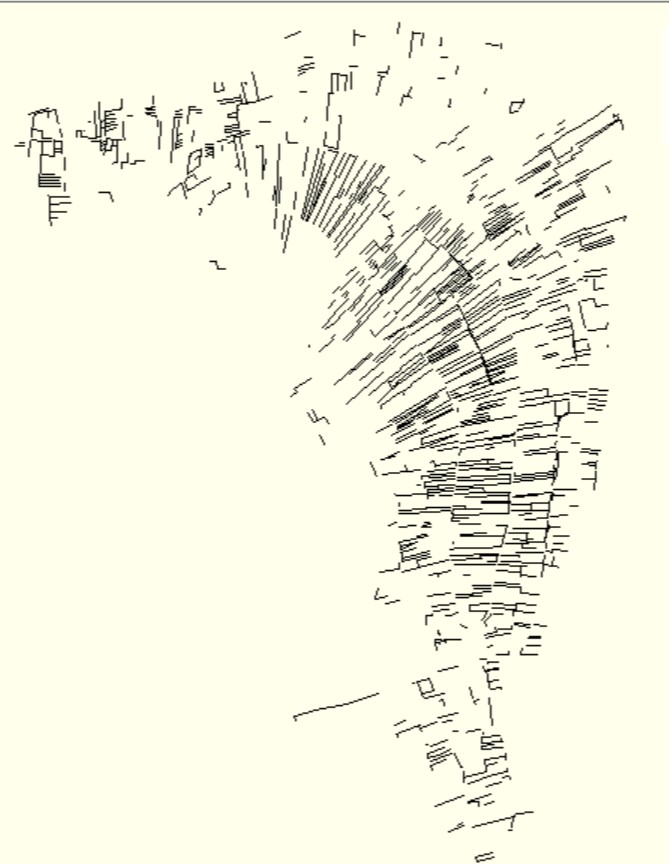
Remaining plantation walls in Thomery in 2020.

Over the past few years, a small number of individuals and an association of Thomeryons have sought to revive this glorious past by creating a small local museum and a tour of the old Salomon greenhouses. Grapes are still grown by a few private individuals for heritage purposes and for local consumption in some of the surrounding restaurants. Certain walls were listed as historic monuments on 5 May 1993, in particular the entire "Chemin des Longs Sillons", as well as the orchards, walls, and adjoining and perpendicular plots, which constitute a fine example of historic walls dating from 1730 and those from the expansion period of 1840. A pre-inventory is currently underway with a view to obtaining the "Remarkable Garden" label. In addition, wine tours are organized and signposted in the village, particularly during the Heritage Days.

In 2012, with financial support from the département and the region, the Thomery municipality decided to create a Chasselas house-museum, which should have been inaugurated in 2013. The project was abandoned by the département and the region at the municipality's expense in 2016.

== Ampelographic features ==
The wood of Vitis vinifera variety Chasselas de Thomery is reddish, the vine shoots are thin, the average internode length is about eight centimeters, the merithalles (Note: Interval between two nodes or between two leaf insertions on a shoot.) are close together, and the buds are relatively large. Leaves are medium-sized, light green (Note: A blond-colored sub-variety exists.), not downy underneath, with five lobes and deeply toothed. Bunches of grapes are of variable size, usually large and elongated, with a medium berry density. Berries are round and of uneven size. The skin is a transparent light-green to golden-yellow color, turning brown on the side exposed to the sun. The pulp is light-green, gelatinous, very sweet, with one to four seeds per berry.

== Viticulture ==
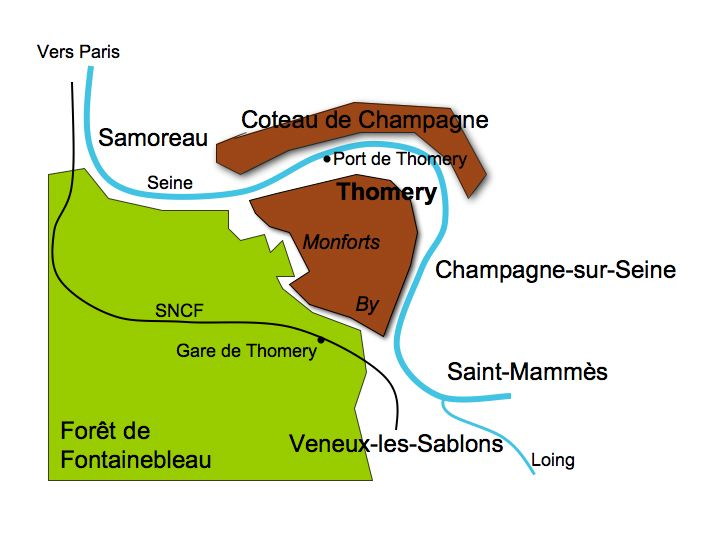
Schematic geography of the Thomery region (brown: hillsides).

=== Soil and climate ===
The commune's soils are mainly sandy-clay of alluvial origin. The two-meter-thick layer of impermeable reddish clay lies at a depth of around two meters and rests on fissured rock. The shortcomings of this mediocre type of soil, which is generally recognized as highly unsuitable for vine-growing, have however been counterbalanced by improved cultivation methods, and, relatively rarely for vines, by the triennial use of large quantities of natural fertilizers such as horse and cow manure (mixed in equal proportions) and spread in wide trenches opened at the start of winter for about a meter at the foot of the vines. The gentle slope of the land and the presence of sand provide excellent drainage for rainwater.

The special climatic features of Thomery are due to its location, entirely in a meander of the Seine, and to its position at the eastern edge of the Fontainebleau forest, which shelters it from storms. The vineyard is also protected to the north and east by the Champagne-sur-Seine hillside and forest. The morning fog generated by the Seine at the end of September and the beginning of October also favors the final ripening phase of the grapes and their golden color.

Below are climate tables for Melun and Auxerre, 18 and 88 km from Thomery respectively.

Melun Meteorological Survey (91 m) 1961–1990
Months	Jan	Feb	Mar	Apr	May	Jun	Jul	Aug	Sept	Oct	Nov	Dec	Year
Average minimum temperatures (°C)	0,4	0,9	2,4	4,6	8	11	12,6	12,3	10,2	7,2	3,2	1,2	6.2
Average temperatures (°C)	3	4,2	6,7	9,6	13,3	16,4	18,5	18,2	15,6	11,7	6,6	3,8	10.6
Average minimum temperatures (°C)	5,7	7,5	10,9	14,6	18,5	21,9	24,3	24	21,1	16,1	9,9	6,4	15.1
Precipitation (mm)	56,8	47,3	58,7	48,7	62,8	55,4	53,9	46,4	56,5	57,3	60,1	55,8	659.7
Source: Infoclimat and Lameteo.org

Auxerre Meteorological Survey (207 m) 1961–1990
Months	Jan	Feb	Mar	Apr	May	Jun	Jul	Aug	Sept	Oct	Nov	Dec	Year
Average minimum temperatures (°C)	0,1	0,7	2,5	4,7	8,2	11,4	13,3	13,1	10,7	7,5	3,2	0,8	6.4
Average temperatures (°C)	2,9	4,2	6,7	9,7	13,4	16,7	19,1	18,7	16	11,9	6,4	3,5	10.8
Average minimum temperatures (°C)	5,6	7,7	10,9	14,7	18,6	22,1	24,9	24,3	21,4	16,3	9,7	6,2	15.2
Precipitation (mm)	54,2	50,1	49	43,4	74,9	62,5	47,2	54,9	52,1	58,1	52,8	57,3	656.6
Source: Infoclimat Auxerre (1961–1990)

=== Trellis techniques ===
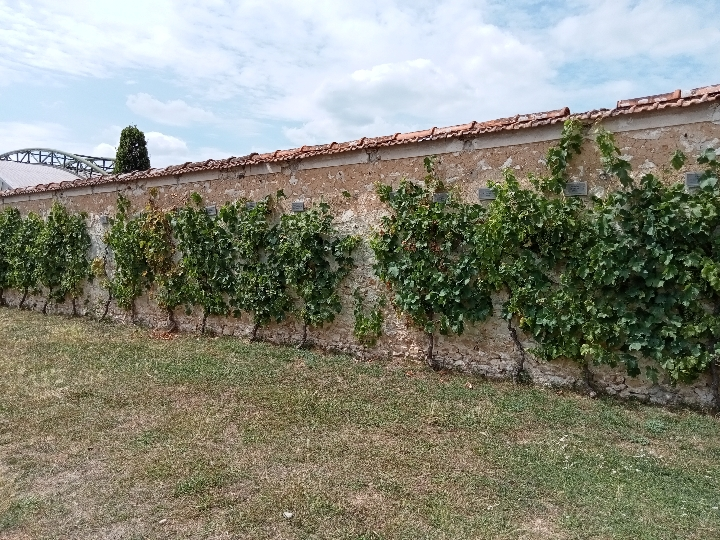
Thomery's walls.

The main distinctive feature of Chasselas cultivation in Thomery, a relatively northerly region for vines, is the use of high espalier walls built from hard stone quarried nearby, held together with earth mortar, and plastered with sand and lime. Initially 2.20 to 2.30 meters high, they were raised around 1850 to an average of 3 meters to maximize production surface area. They are spaced at an average of 9 to 10 meters apart, and are arranged along the slope so as to give the vines the maximum benefit from the sunshine and heat given off by the stone in the evening and at night, and to protect them from the wind. The longest walls could reach 100 meters. At the top of the roof-tile ridge, which protrudes 25 cm, is a small glass canopy which, through a greenhouse effect, increases the amount of sunshine and protects the grapes from the rain. The vines are planted only in front of the south-facing walls, spaced 60 to 70 centimeters apart and growing mainly horizontally. Counter-trellises about one meter high are erected one meter from the walls to grow other alternative vegetable crops such as apples or pears in the traditional way.

Vines are propagated mainly by simple or basket layering, as well as by cuttings during the March–April period. In the 1850s–1900s, seedlings were also used. Grafting was sometimes used. Vine pruning, essential to the quality of Thomery Chasselas, began in February and was carried out with two eyes (including the heel eye), preserving only the strongest shoots, which were led over the wires running along the walls. Since the beginning of the nineteenth century, trellises at Thomery have been trained using five techniques, all designed to ensure rapid ripening of the wood and the most even possible distribution of sap throughout the plant:

- Rose Charmeux horizontal cordon (the historic one from 1830);
- simple vertical cordon with alternating spurs (espaliers and counter-espaliers);
- Rose Charmeux vertical cordon with alternating spurs (espaliers and counter-espaliers, created in 1852 and most common around 1880);
- Rose Charmeux vertical cordon with opposing spandrels;
- 30º oblique cordon (counter-paliers only).
Left to right: [1] Horizontal Cordon of Charmeux (1830); [2] Alternating Vertical Cordon of Charmeux (1852); [3] Opposite Vertical Cordon of Charmeux

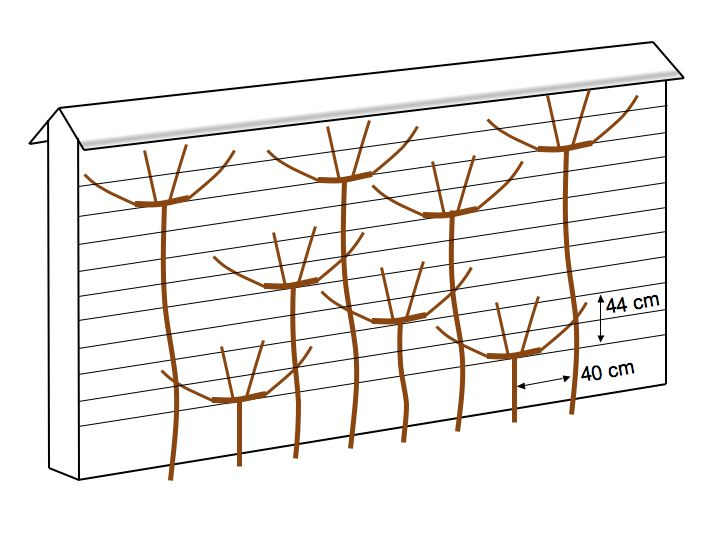

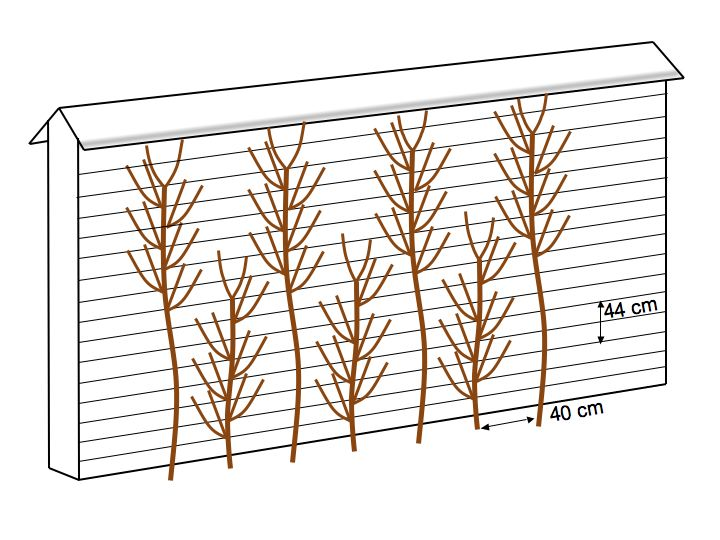

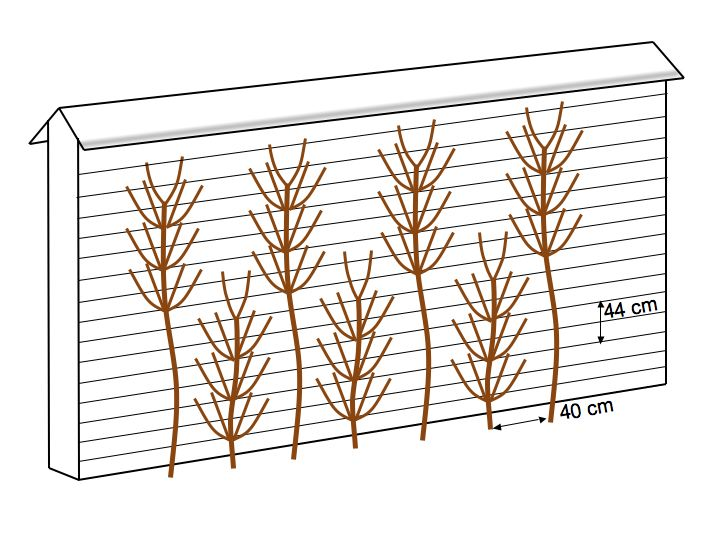

Historically, the Rose Charmeux horizontal cordon pruning technique established in 1828 was the most widely used, but it was difficult to implement and had the disadvantage of favoring the upper cordon over the lower when the vines were older. Charmeux later developed a second technique in 1852, called "cordon vertical Rose Charmeux à coursons alternés" (Charmeux vertical cordon with alternating spurs) derived from the first, which is simpler to apply and solves sap distribution problems even better. This second method was widely applied by "chasselatiers" after the harsh winters of 1871 and 1879, when many of their vines perished and had to be replanted.

During its vegetative cycle, the vine is disbudded of branches not bearing fruit, and then sulphured immediately, even in the declared absence of powdery mildew. Fifteen days later, the shoots are disbudded and the internodes removed to minimize the loss of sap from unnecessary parts. The vine is pinched at the end of unnecessary shoots to prevent their growth, then trellised ten days later, generally around 25 May, to secure it to the wall on the current wires. After an initial light leaf-thinning, the bunches are trimmed to remove the smallest berries from the best bunches, or to aerate bunches that are too dense. A green harvest is carried out, leaving a maximum of 15 to 18 bunches per vine. It is generally accepted that thomeryone pruning is a decisive factor in grape quality. Extensive leaf thinning is carried out at the very beginning of ripening to encourage the final stages and give the grapes their golden color. During the last fortnight before the harvest, which takes place around 1 October, the bunches are individually bagged to encourage their final ripening and protect them from the voracity of birds, or protected behind wooden frames with stretched canvas to shelter them from the elements.

The quality of Chasselas de Thomery is ultimately due to the gradual improvement in techniques for combating the late ripening of vines in northern regions, and for distributing the sap as evenly as possible throughout the plant using the pruning techniques specific to Thomery winegrowers. To this end, the establishment of productive espaliers is a lengthy process for which nineteenth-century winegrowers established a proverb:

"He who plants an espalier is not the one who will tear it up.".

=== In-chamber conservation ===
It refers to the process for preserving grapes for several months in grape chambers, also known as "fruitiers", that led to the major expansion of winegrowing in Thomery from 1850 onwards, and the subsequent prosperity of the village's "chasselatiers". From October onwards, these fruit trees were installed in the attics or cellars of houses, to protect the grapes from the cold, draughts, and light, in optimal temperature conditions, by keeping them at around 10 °C. To achieve this, a system of circulating cool or warm air is installed.

Since 1848, the use of small zinc tubes became widespread, followed by stoneware, and finally, starting in 1865, small bottles inclined at a 45º angle on a series of wooden racks and filled with water (around 20 to 30 centiliters), in which one grape stalk per bottle is soaked to prevent it from drying out or wilting once cut. This process of preserving "fresh grapes" or "green grapes", discovered by chance by Baptiste Larpenteur, who placed a cob in a container of water as a floral decoration, and optimized by Baptiste-Rose Charmeux, was patented in 1877. The stalk compensates for the evaporation of water from the surface of the grapes, which remained turgid, keeping the bunches "as if newly picked from the vine" for over three months, and in perfect condition for around six months. In an 1860 issue of the Revue des deux Mondes, Mr. Payen reported having seen bunches of Thomery Chasselas harvested in September 1859 at the exhibition of the Société centrale d'horticulture held at the Palais de l'Industrie in May 1860, which were "perfectly preserved using this method by Messrs Rose and Constant Charmeux". A grape chamber could hold 2,000 to 3,000 bottles, each containing a cluster of one or two grapes. Some large producers had as many as 40,000 bottles in their rooms. Some of the grapes that inevitably rotted during the storage period had to be removed by hand on a regular basis to avoid spoiling the whole bunch, and charcoal was placed in the bottle to prevent the water from stagnating.

In the past, bunches were harvested as late as possible (between 15 October and 15 November) and simply placed either in wicker baskets filled with large quantities of fern leaves or hung from circular hangers by special small iron hooks and stored in well-ventilated fruit boxes. This process enabled the wine to be stored until January without any major problems, and to celebrate the local feast of Saint Vincent, patron saint of winegrowers, on the Saturday closest to the 22nd day of that month. In addition to prolonging the shelf life of the grapes, the bottling technique also preserved their organoleptic qualities by keeping them fresh.

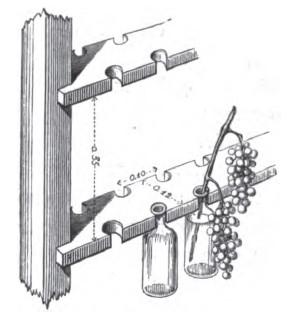
Preservation of grapes with fresh stalks in flasks containing water (Rose Charmeux (1863), fig. 37, p. 80).

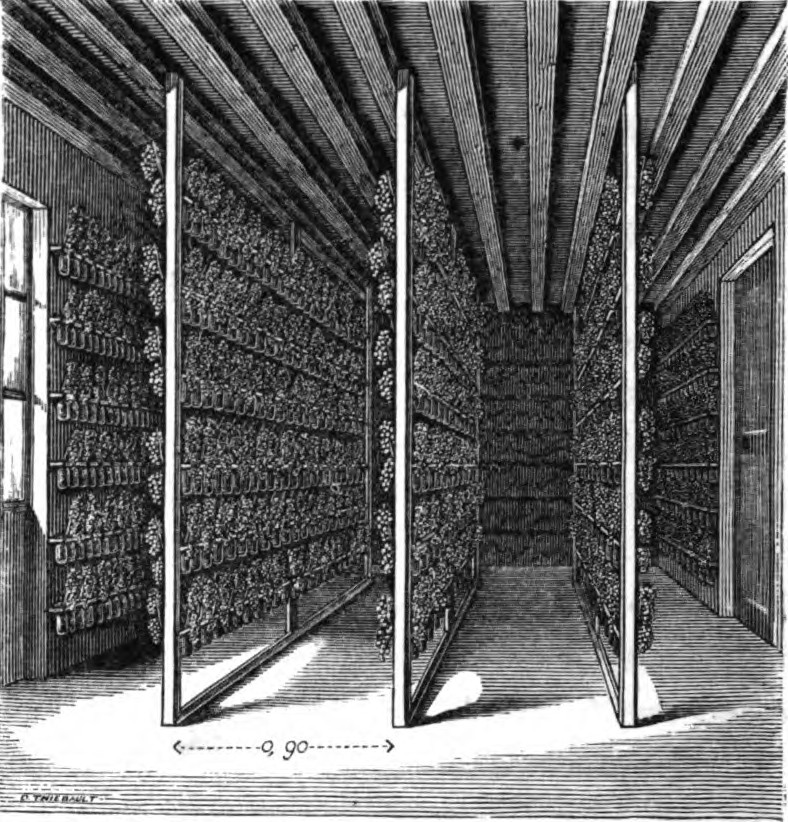
Interior of a fruit tree used to store grapes (Rose Charmeux (1863), fig.36, p. 78).

== Techniques dissemination ==
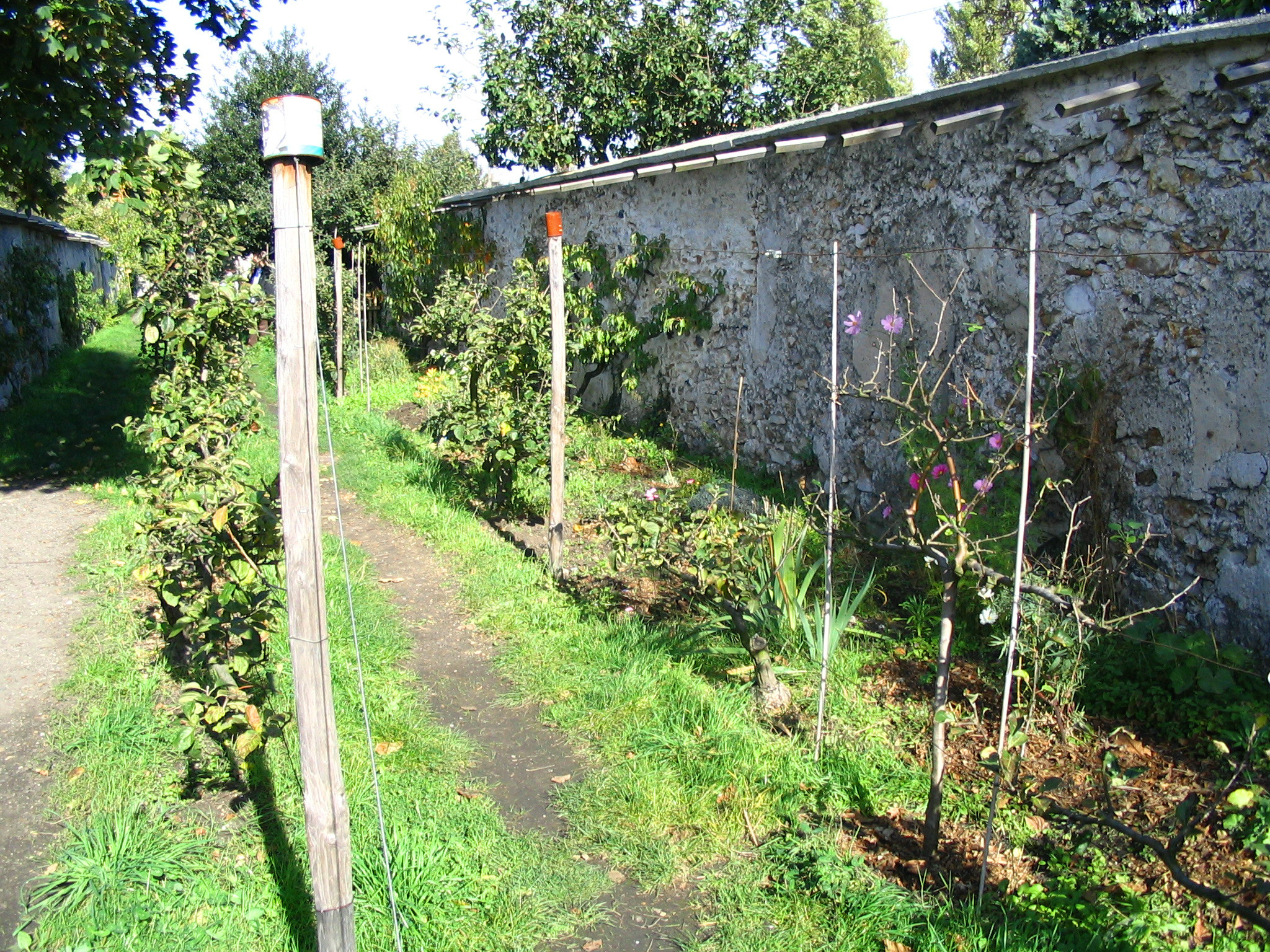
The Montreuil-sous-Bois mur à pêches, adopting the same cultivation techniques.

The first report on the specific techniques used at Thomery to grow its Chasselas grapes was submitted to the Société royale d'horticulture in 1836. By the 1840s, all these techniques, known as "à la Thomery", were being advocated and sometimes adopted for grape cultivation in the Île-de-France region, notably under the impetus of Jean-Baptiste Lelieur, Director of the Imperial Gardens and the Potager du roi at Versailles, who devoted a large part of his book La Pomone française (first edition in 1816, second in 1842) to explaining and extolling their specific features and particularly advantageous results. In the first half of the nineteenth century, Lelieur advocated the use of Thomery's viticultural techniques, which were better for quality grapes than those of Montreuil-sous-bois, where the peach wall (mur à pêches) were also used for this purpose. Around 1860, the use of cordon Charmeux techniques was attested to in this commune.

The Crapotte family also used the "à la Thomery" method on walls in Conflans-Sainte-Honorine, developing it in the second half of the 19th century on the limestone hillsides of the town (the hillside bordering the right bank of the Seine, but also around the present-day town hall, and on the plateau in the "Chennevières" district), although they decided not to store the grapes for long and to sell them immediately. They also developed the novel technique of piercing the walls to plant some of the vines on the north side, then passing the shoots to the south side where the grapes could ripen well.

Thomery winegrowers also promoted their product and growing methods extensively, taking part in numerous French (including the 1867 Universal Exhibition in Paris) and international (Brussels, London, Berlin, St Petersburg) horticultural exhibitions, where they won numerous awards. In the first half of the 19th century, Belgian horticulturist Édouard Parthon de Von also adopted Thomery's techniques for his vineyards in Antwerp, Belgium. In 1862, the Scottish-born American academic John Phin (1832–1913) published an extremely detailed work entitled Open Air Grape Culture, partly devoted to the dissemination of Thomery viticultural methods, using the material previously published by Lelieur, with additional details obtained from Alphonse Du Breuil, founder of the École municipale et départementale d'arboriculture de la ville de Paris and future École du Breuil. However, the influence of this book on viticultural processes in the New World is unknown.

== See also ==
- Peach wall
- Chemin des Longs Sillons

== Appendix ==
=== Bibliography ===
- John Claudius Loudon, Encyclopedia of Gardening, 1835 (page dedicated to Chasselas de Thomery accessible via this link archive
- ^{(fr)} Jean-Baptiste Lelieur, La Pomone française ou Traité de la culture et de la taille des arbres fruitiers, Paris, éditions Henri Cousin, 1842 (read online archive)
- John Phin, Open Air Grape Culture, New York, O.M. Saxton, Agricultural Book Publisher, 1862 (read online archive)
- ^{(fr)} Baptiste Rose Charmeux, La Culture du chasselas à Thomery, Paris, éditions Victor Masson et fils, 1863 (read online archive)
- ^{(fr)} Michel Pons, Thomery : patrimoine viticole, Association de préfiguration du Musée de la Vigne, 2003 (ISBN 978-2-9518986-1-5).
- ^{(fr)} Collective work edited by Jean-René Tronchet, Jean-Jacques Péru, and Jean-Michel Roy, Jardinage en région parisien : xviie au xxe siècles, Paris, éditions Créaphis, 2003, 275 p. (ISBN 978-2-913610-18-7)

=== External links ===
- Thomery website archive
