= Fruit picking =

Manual harvesting of fruit

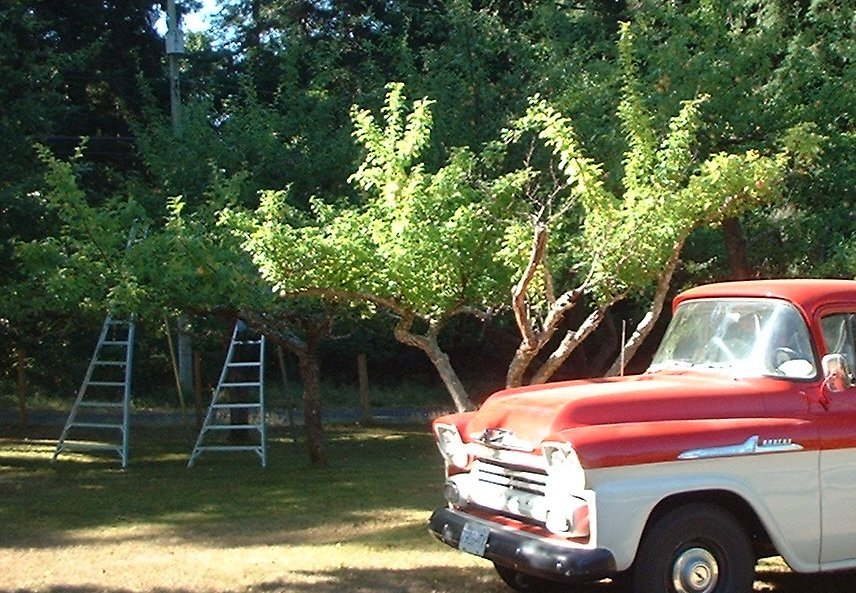
Orchard ladders in old farmstead apple orchard British Columbia, Canada, 2005

Fruit picking or fruit harvesting is a seasonal activity (paid, recreational or mechanical) that occurs during harvest time in areas with fruit growing wild or being farmed in orchards. Some farms market "You-Pick" for orchards, such as the tradition of apple and orange picking in North America, as a form of value-added agritourism.

== Types of fruit ==
=== Apple picking ===
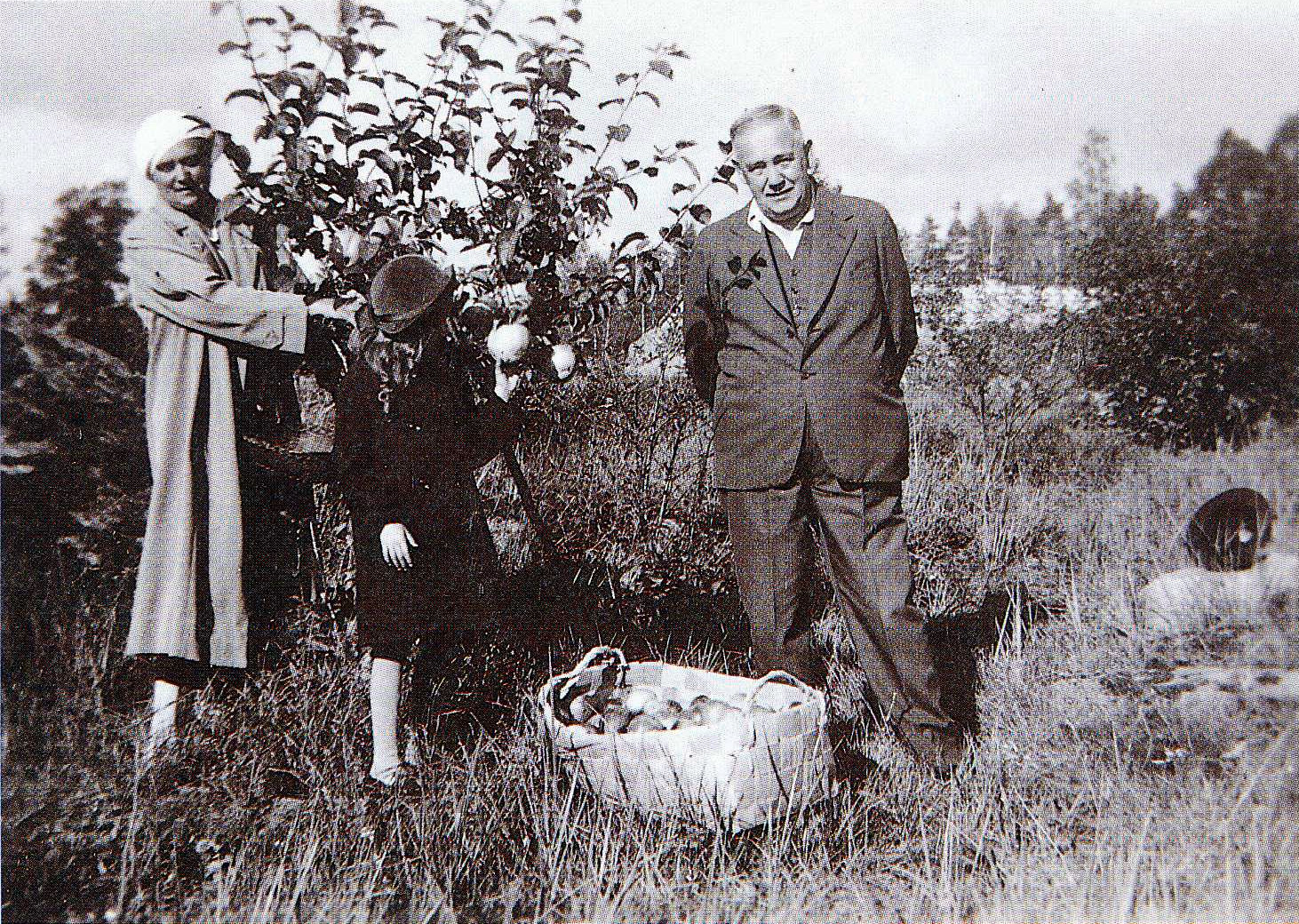
L. K. Relander, the former President of Finland, with his family picking apples in the 1930s.

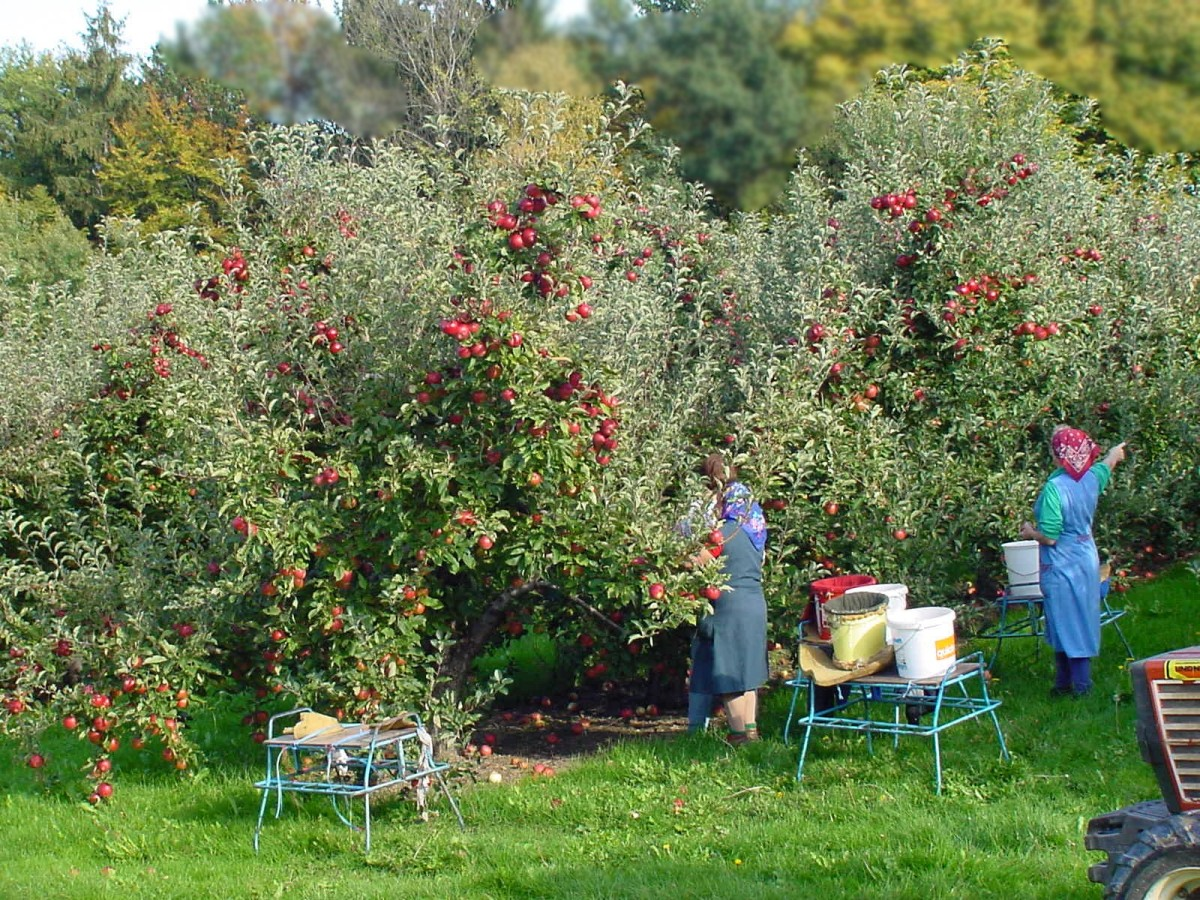
Apple picking in Styria

Apple picking is an activity found at apple farms. Apple orchards may be opened to the public, allowing consumers to pick their own apples or purchase pre-picked apples.

Although it is ultimately a method of purchasing apples, apple picking is often a social activity as well. Apple picking is often a very popular dating ritual in the American Midwest. Apple orchards catering to a family outing will provide additional activities beyond the picking of apples. Many have petting zoos, restaurants, corn mazes and country shops that sell related products such as home-made jams and jellies. This aspect of the activity is especially popular in parts of North America where orchards are common, such as the Northeastern United States, Southern Ontario, Southern Québec and Nova Scotia in Canada.

The apples that fall off the trees are often used to make apple cider. Apple cider is a juice made by grinding the apples, then pressing out the juice.

There are several tests that are used to determine apple fruit maturity, and these will be described throughout this article. But before performing any measurement, the first step is to know how to collect a representative fruit sample from the orchard block.

== Workers ==
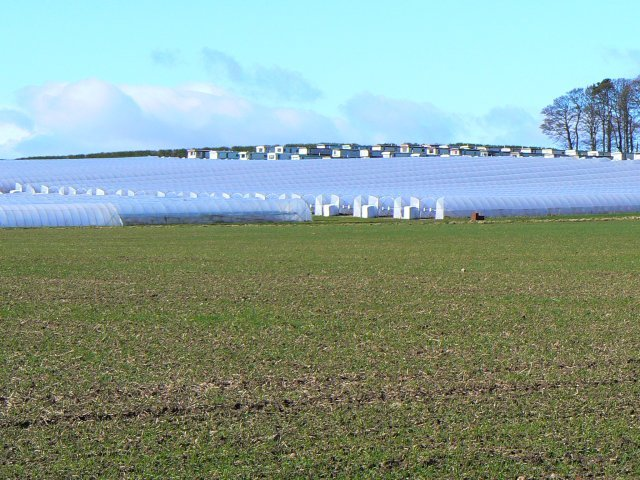
Fruit-growing polytunnels with caravans for the mainly Eastern European fruit workers conveniently parked behind, Perth and Kinross, Scotland, March 2009

Most fruit picking is done by migrant workers, who can be paid relatively low wages. In California, Mexican migrants most frequently do the work. There has been much controversy about replacing workers with automation. It puts many out of work.

In Australia and New Zealand, people engaging in backpacker tourism do a lot of the fruit-picking work while on a working holiday visa. The Australian government encourages people on this visa to do this sort of work for a minimum of three months so they can add another year to their visa. This benefit does not apply to all parts of Australia - one must undertake work in selected post-code areas to become eligible for the extra year.

Monoculture orchards can face particular labor-timetable issues.

== Automation ==
As labor costs add significantly to the overall cost of fruit production, robots are being designed to replace humans for this kind of work. By 2007 the research was in full progress, with engineers focusing on careful design so that the robots do not bruise the fruit while picking. One solution is the use of suction grippers. Citrus fruit robot pickers have thus far been the focus of research and development, but cherry pickers are also being researched.

== Fruit picking in art ==
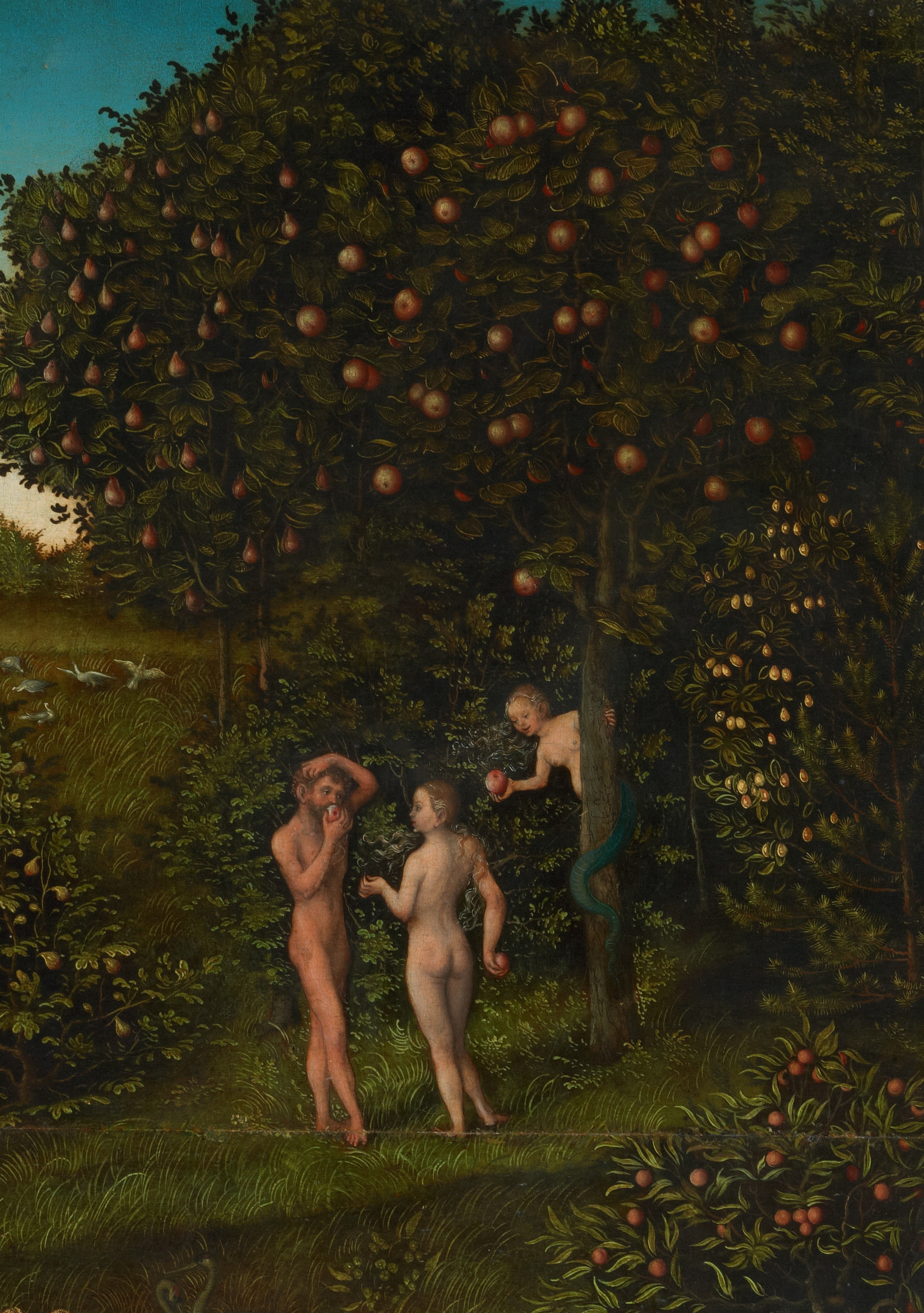
Lucas Cranach the Elder, Paradise (detail), 1530

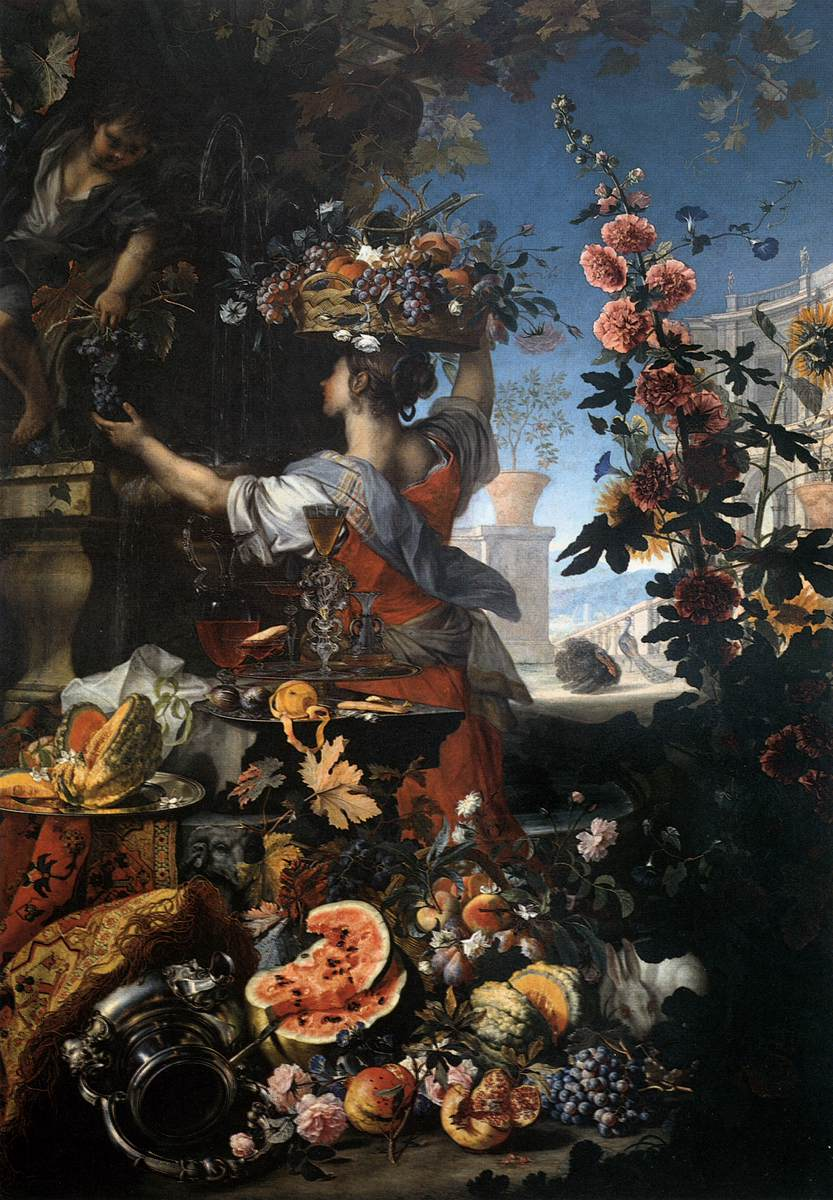
Christian Berentz, Flowers, Fruit with a Woman Picking Grapes, 1696

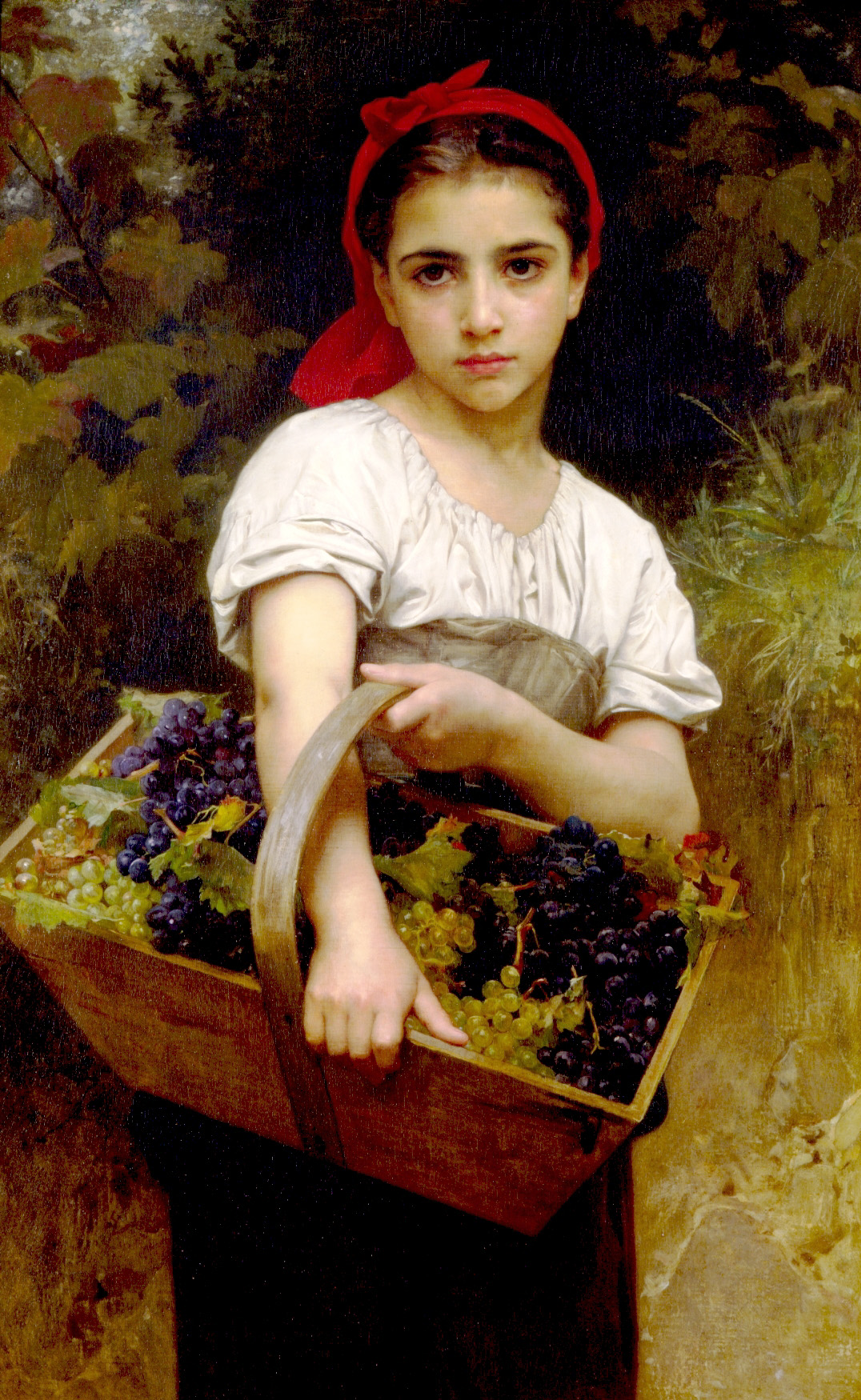
William-Adolphe Bouguereau, The grape picker, 1875

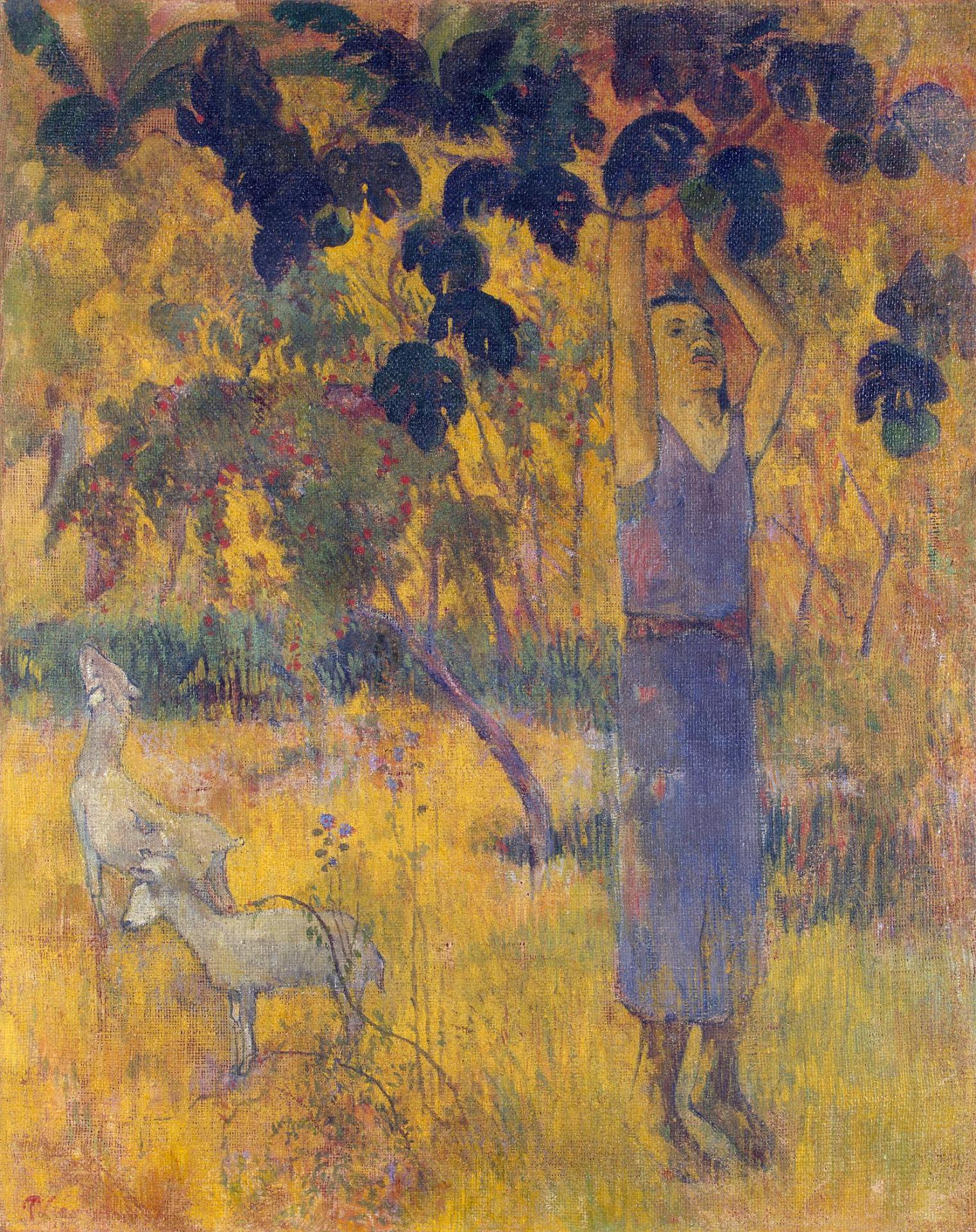
Paul Gauguin, La récolte or Homme cueillant des fruits, 1897

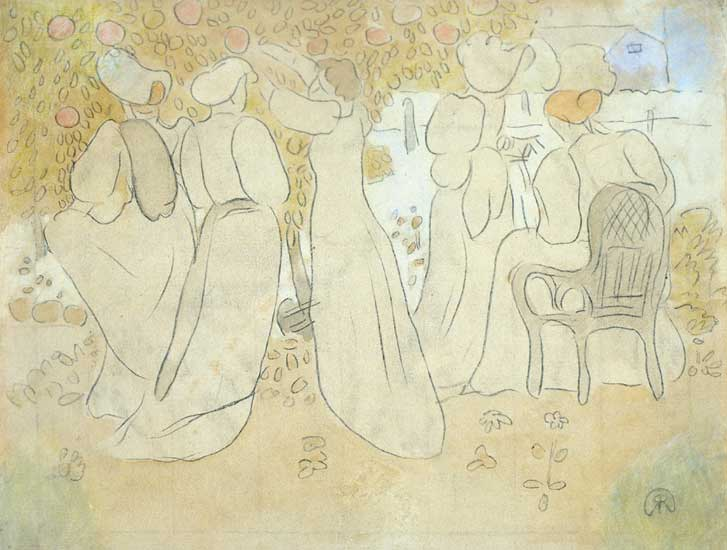
József Rippl-Rónai, Fruit-picking Women ('Gyümölcsszedő hölgyek)

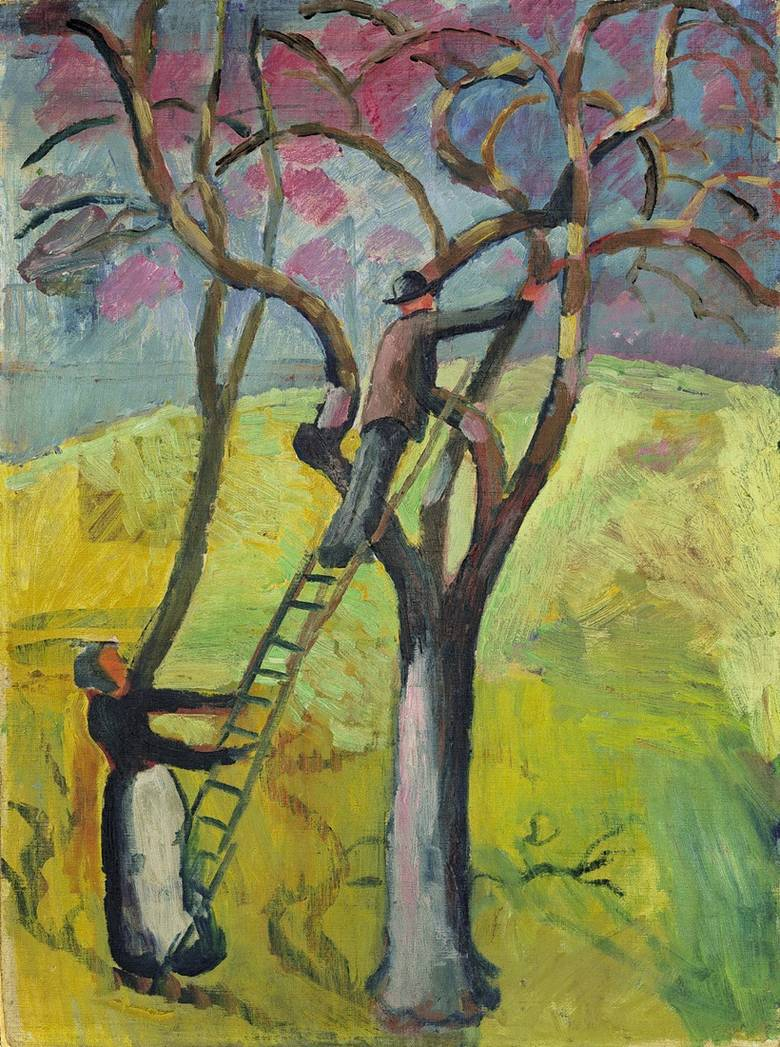
August Macke, Obsternte, 1913

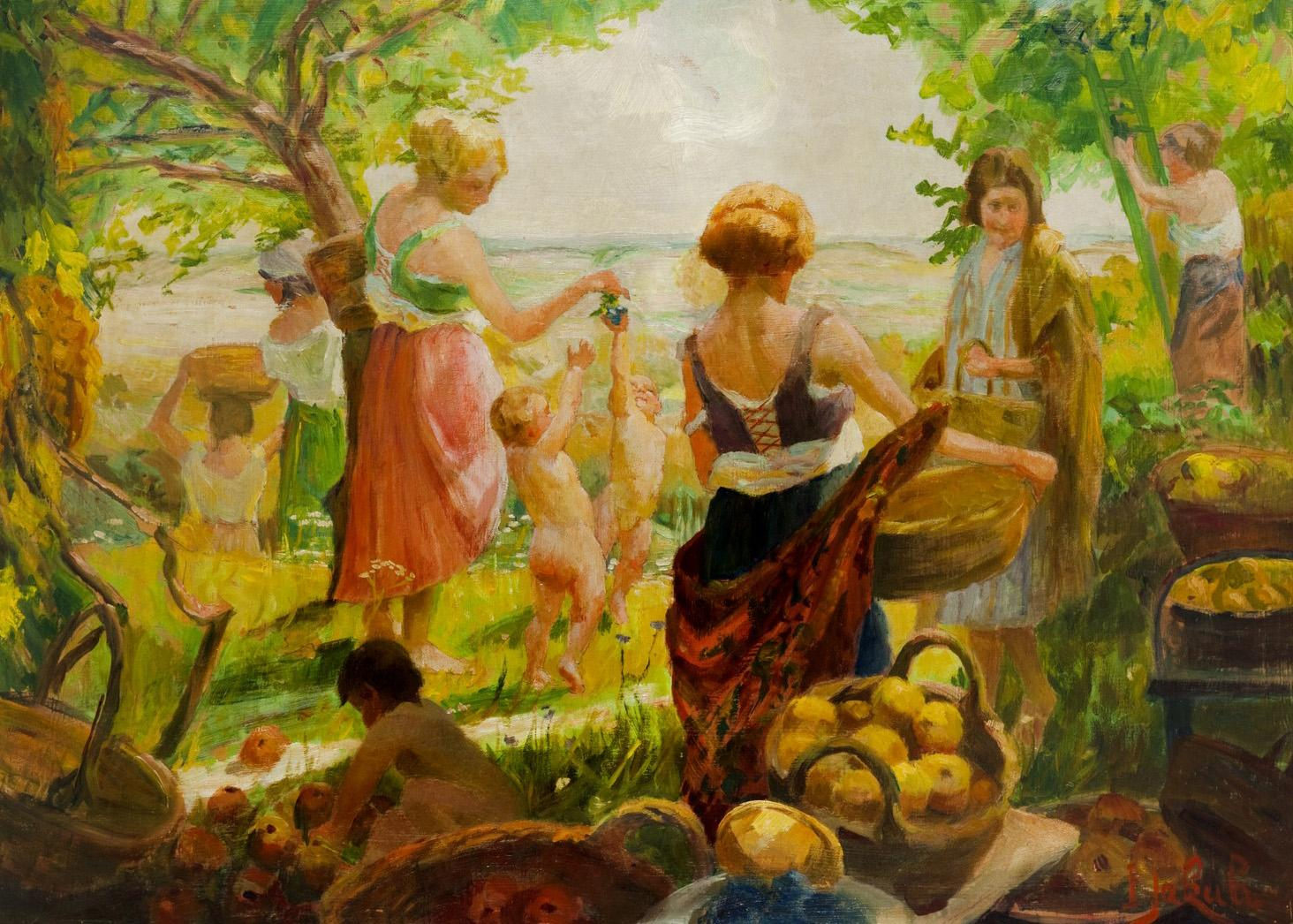
František Jakub (Czech, 1875 – 1940), Obsternte, by 1950

== See also ==
- Cherry picker
- Working Holiday Visa
- Peach wall
