= Peach wall =

French agricultural technique

Murs à pêches
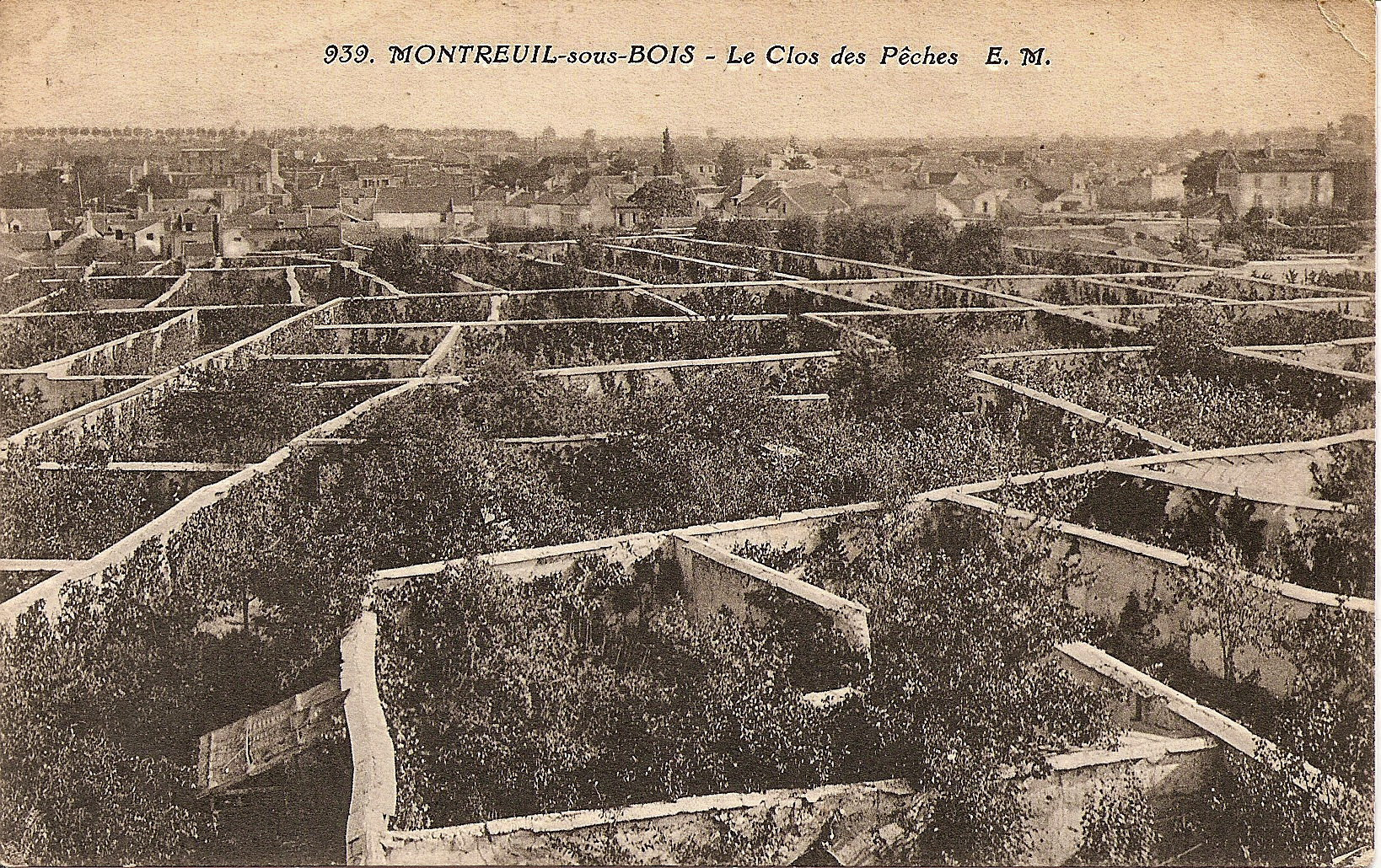
- Peach walls at the beginning of the 20th century, when they were used by arboriculturists.
- Type: Tree wall
- Place of origin: Montreuil, Seine-Saint-Denis
- Region or state: France
- Other information: Patrimony at Risk (2020); Listed in the general inventory; Patrimony of the General inventory of cultural heritage (2020)

Peach walls are a French technique of growing peach trees beside walls, with limbs being espaliered or trellised. Peach walls were established as early as the 17th century in Montreuil, Seine-Saint-Denis.

At their peak in 1870, the Montreuil peach orchards were 600 km long and produced 17 million peaches. (Note: The extraordinary labyrinth of walls led the Prussians to bypass Montreuil during the 1870 siege of Paris.) These crops, unique alongside those of Chasselas de Thomery, near Fontainebleau, which adopted the same principle, enabled fruit varieties usually reserved for the mild climates of southern France to be produced in the climate of the Paris region.

== History in Montreuil ==
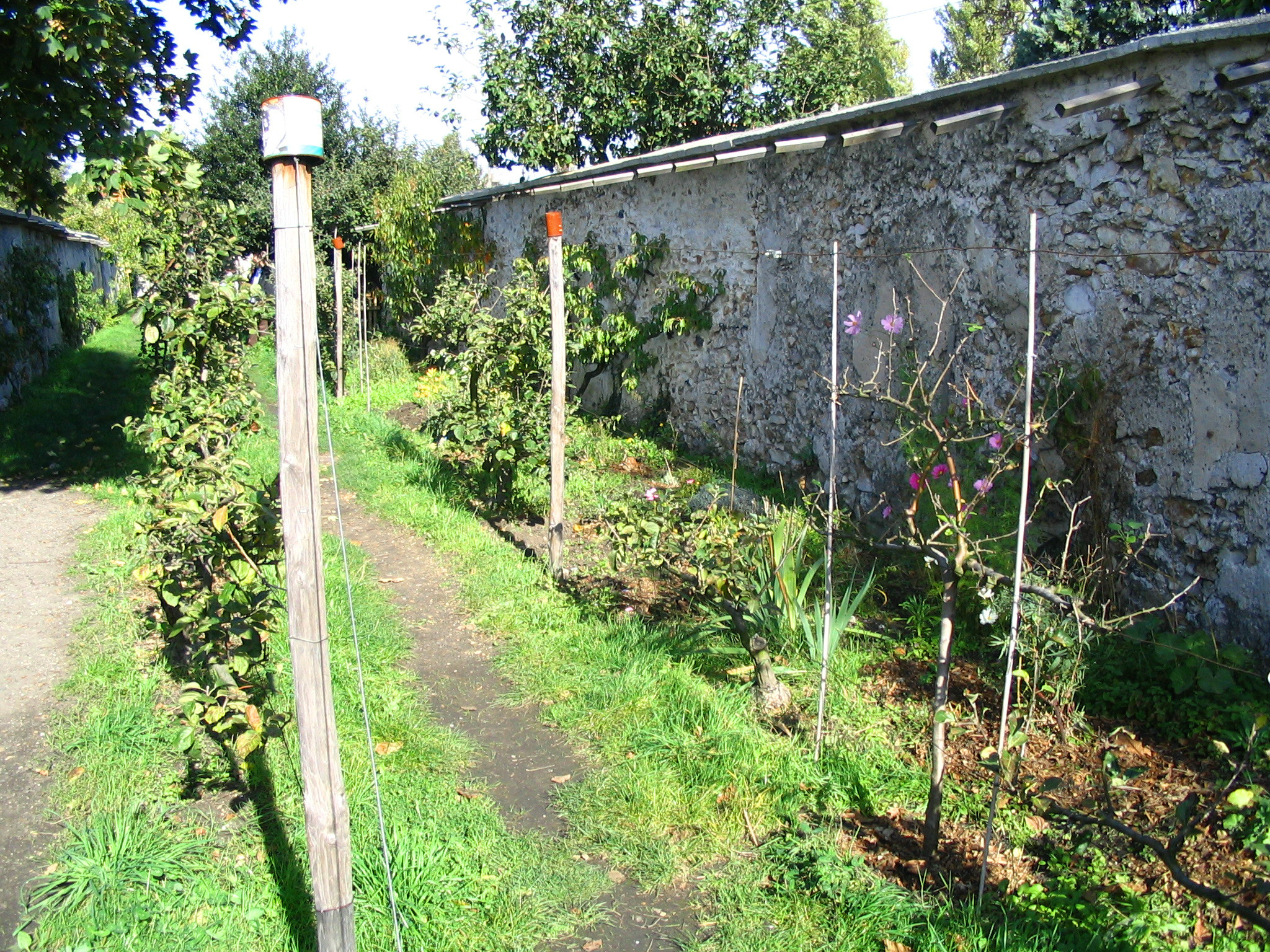
A few plots of peache walls have been restored by the MAP association.

On the vast Montreuil plateau, each narrow, elongated plot, oriented north–south, was enclosed by a 2.70 m-high wall, topped by a tile roof. The southern walls, which enclosed the plot, were set back from the road, to preserve a usable side. A fruit tree called "costière en dehors" was planted here.

The walls were floated with plaster to increase their thermal inertia, i.e. their heat retention capacity. By accumulating solar energy during the day and releasing it at night, they reduced the risk of frost and accelerated ripening. As Montreuil's subsoil was rich in gypsum, plaster was cheap and easy to produce.

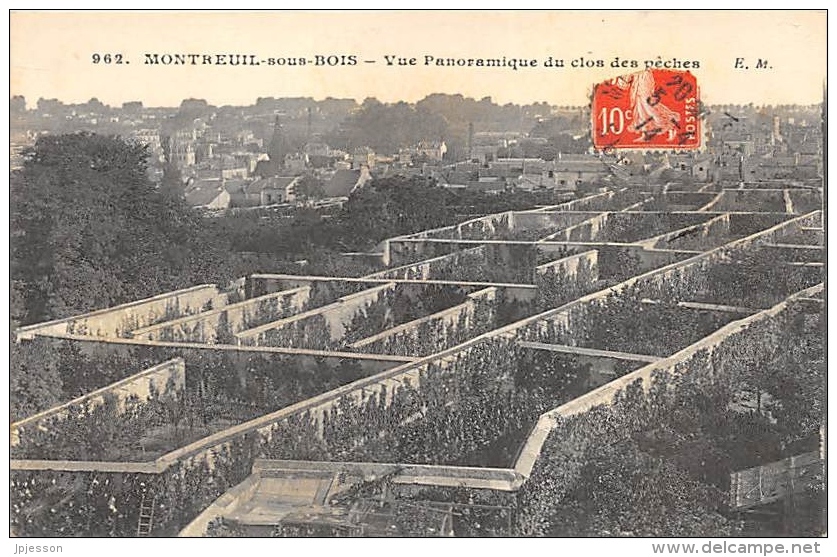
Montreuil-sous-Bois: panoramic view of the clos des pêches.

The thickness of the walls, built on a foundation to prevent rising dampness, varied from 55 cm at the base to 25 cm at the top. A system of removable wooden roofs protected against spring rains, which can lead to peach blistering. Rolling mats insulated the fruit trees on cold nights.

In these isolated plots, temperatures were routinely 8 to 12 °C above ambient.

=== Trellising and cultivation ===
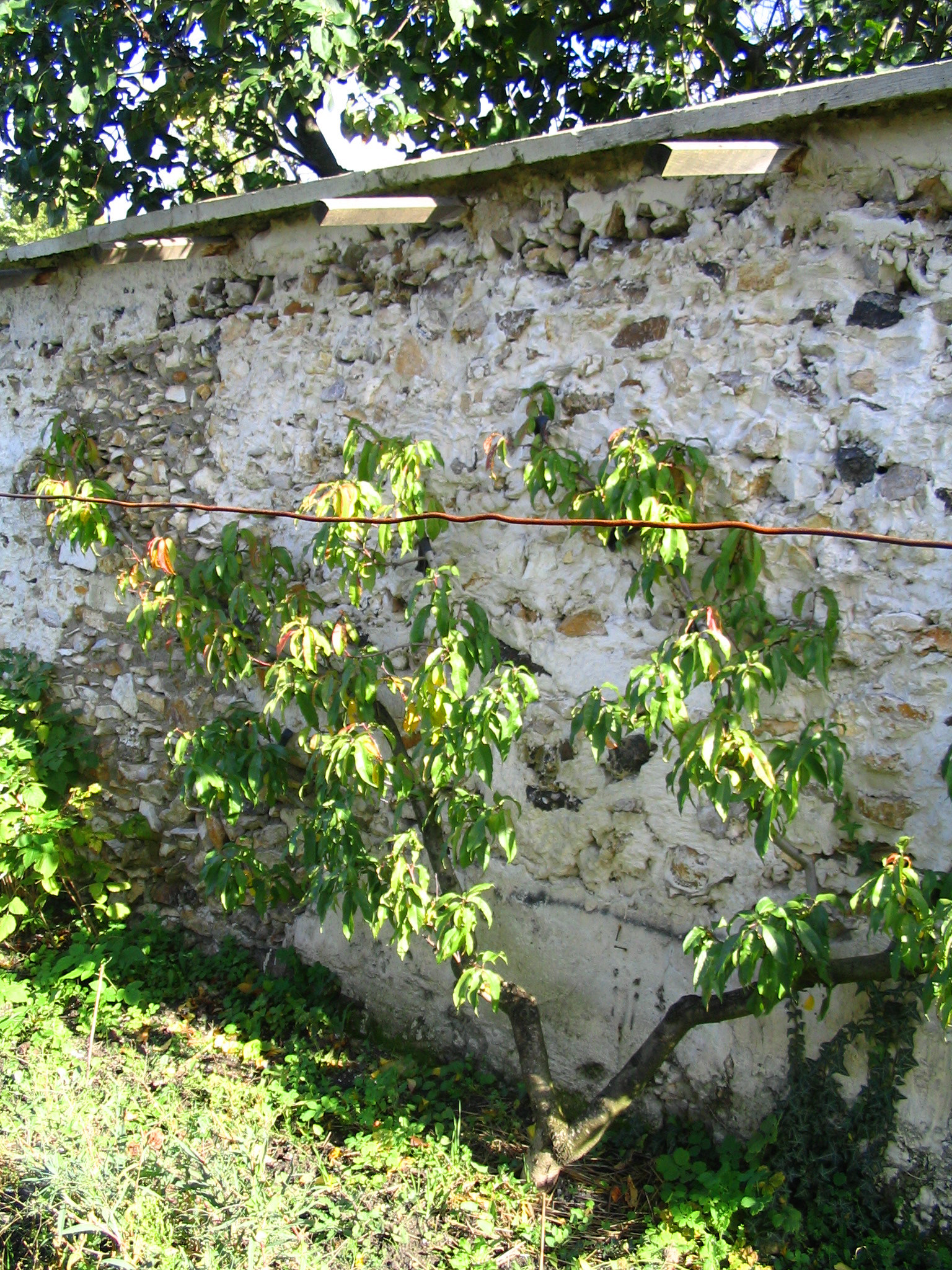
Peach tree trellising: the branches are attached to the wall with nailed "rags". The wooden parts at the top of the wall support removable roofs during inclement weather.

To adapt to the plateau's limestone soil, peach trees were grafted onto almond rootstock trees. They were pruned to fit as close as possible to the heat-producing wall. The peach trees, trained in espaliers "à la diable", (Note: Devil trellising consisted of a balanced distribution of two carpenter branches, guided at an angle. A peach tree trained in this way could cover up to 12 m of wall and produce 400 kg of fruit.) were leaning against the east and west walls, and trellised with canvas ties nailed into the masonry. (Note: Palissage à la loque. These strips of fabric, salvaged from craftsmen in the Rue de Paris, were used to secure branches to walls, without the risk of injuring them.)

The central part of each plot was also planted with peach or apple trees, which did not need to be protected by walls. Wind-fed peach trees produced smaller fruit than trellised ones, but had one advantage: there was no need to brush the fruit, which lost its fuzz in the wind.

The presence of the vast Parisian market, with its proximity to Les Halles, provided a guaranteed outlet for these crops. (Note: Until the Baltard pavilions at Les Halles de Paris were demolished in the 1970s, one pavilion remained for the Montreuil horticulturists. At the height of production, 600 Montreuil families made a living from horticulture.) The fruit merchants who came to Les Halles de Paris were known as montreuils, as were their peaches. Émile Zola mentions them in Le Ventre de Paris: "the peaches above all, the blushing Montreuil ones, thin-skinned and fair like Northern girls".

This production was complemented by floral crops (lilacs, daffodils, irises, delphiniums, roses, peonies), and by vine and raspberry plantations, which provided additional income for arboriculturists. They are also evoked by Zola, who mentions "the brilliants and Valenciennes worn by the daughters of the great gardeners of Montreuil, who came among their roses".

=== At the king's table ===
Montreuil peaches became famous thanks to their presence at the French court in the 17th century. This reputation facilitated their export to the finest tables in neighboring countries. The Queen of England, and even the Tsars of Russia, imported peaches from Montreuil. Many of the peach varieties now grown around the world were created in Montreuil at this time, including the Prince of Wales, the Grosse Mignonne, and the Téton de Vénus.

Among the montreuillois horticulturists most active in variety creation were Alexis Lepère (1799–1883), Arthur Chevreau, Joseph Beausse, Désiré Chevalier and Louis Aubin.

=== 19th-century decline ===
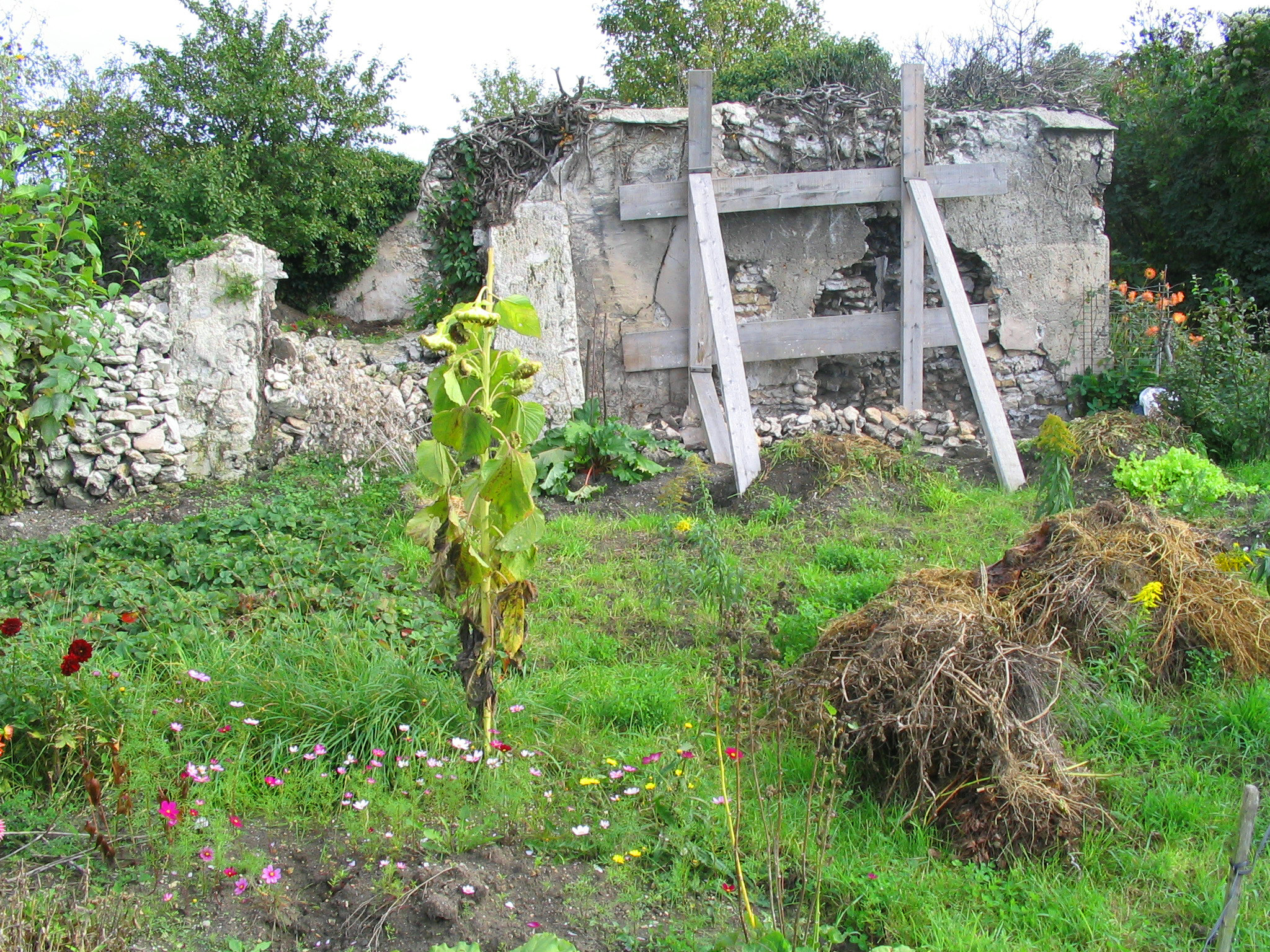
The absence of a comprehensive development project on the part of the municipality and the Conseil Général is leading to the rapid and irreversible destruction of the remaining orchards.

Peach orchards reached their apogee in the second half of the 19th century, covering more than a third of the town of Montreuil, 320 ha for more than 300 km of walls and around 600 km of linear planting, and extending well into the towns of Rosny, Romainville, Bagnolet and Fontenay.

From the end of the 19th century, the expansion of the railroads led to a decline in peach production. Fruit from the south of France, which came earlier, was the first to reach the Paris market, at a lower cost. (Note: In 1936, the Savard family of horticulturists uprooted 700 peach trees from their plots.) Orchards and walls were gradually destroyed and disappeared into the urban fabric. In 2006, 17 km of severely degraded walls remained, out of the original 600 km. The Murs à pêches (MAP) association is working to save them. (Note: Since 1994, this association has been working to preserve this exceptional heritage by replanting the fruit trees, rebuilding the walls, and bringing the site to life.)

=== Site evolution 1950-2010 ===
In 1953, an area of 50 ha was classified as a protected horticultural zone, but the 1976 SDRIF transformed the sector into an urban green space reserve. When the SDRIF was revised in 1994, this protective status was transformed into an 80% urban zone, reflecting the State's abandonment of the site, with the consent of the municipality at the time.

Despite the obvious reluctance of the commune and the Conseil Général, who downgraded the remaining 37 ha to a "land reserve" for business activities, 8.5 ha were finally retained and definitively classified by the French Ministry of Ecology on December 16, 2003, as a Site and Landscape.

This protected area (only 300 × 300 m) in no way resolves the future of the remaining gardens, now occupied by scrap merchants. (Note: Two companies involved in the transit and sorting of industrial and construction site waste were forced to vacate the site in the summer of 2008. Source: Marjorie Corcier, "Montreuil: l'entreprise polluante doit quitter les murs à pêches", Le Parisien édition Seine-Saint-Denis, July 18, 2008.)

According to the association, an immediate and inexpensive solution would be to rent out these plots to residents, in the form of allotments - there is a very high unmet demand for allotments in Montreuil -, which would enhance and preserve the site and enable the walls to be gradually renovated. In the meantime, the association has acquired a 600 m^{2} plot that its owner wished to sell, and a public subscription was launched in the summer of 2007 to raise the necessary €24,000. An international youth work camp organized by Union Rempart enabled some twenty meters of wall to be replastered during the summer of 2007. Since then, the same association has restored the outer wall, known as the "costière".

=== Site evolution since 2010 ===
In 2015, a project to sell plots of land to the Bouygues group, the result of an appeal entitled Inventons la métropole du Grand Paris (Let's Invent the Greater Paris Metropolis), sparked controversy and provoked a major mobilization. An opinion piece, with 800 signatories in 2018, denounced the "attacks of the concreters" and opposed the transfer of the two hectares concerned by the project from natural zone jurisdiction to that of an urbanizable zone. Representatives of the MAP (Murs-À-Pêches) federation call on the municipality to "withdraw the Grand Paris project denaturing the Murs à Pêches site and to set up a public interest grouping to properly administer this site of national interest". The mayor's office retorts, citing "an essential project to provide the necessary funds for reconstruction".

=== Since 2020: progress in heritage development ===
At the end of 2019, three murs à pêches gardens were awarded the "Remarkable Garden" label by the French Ministry of Culture. In 2020, the Murs à pêches are awarded the "Heritage of Regional Interest" label by the Île-de-France Regional Council.

In the same year, the Fondation du Patrimoine granted the site financial aid of 300,000 euros, the largest regional contribution to Stéphane Bern's Heritage Lotto, plus a 50,000 euro cultural sponsorship cheque signed by Française des Jeux and the opening of a popular subscription to raise a further 70,000 euros. For Mayor Patrice Bessac, "this support is recognition of the municipality's determination to move away from the status quo, to halt the continuing deterioration of the site and its walls, and to give impetus to a coherent vision devised collectively, while respecting the natural vocation of the site".

In July 2021, the Montreuil town council voted to increase investment in the preservation of the site. Between 2021 and 2025, almost 1.5 million euros will be devoted to restoring over ten thousand meters of wall.

== Peach walls in art ==
In the middle school of the Voltaire school group (Robespierre metro station), one of the ceramic panels by painter Maurice Boitel (1919–2007), who was commissioned to decorate the buildings in 1954, depicts peach tree espaliers along the stone and plaster walls of a Montreuil-sous-Bois orchard, which was still being tended at the time.

== Local toponymy ==
The peaches of Montreuil have remained part of the commune's cultural heritage, allowing for associations of ideas and puns. Cafés in Montreuil include La Pêche and La Grosse Mignonne, and the former municipal newspaper was named Montreuil Dépêche Hebdo.

The names of the Signac-Murs à pêches and Bel Air-Grands Pêchers-Renan neighborhoods also bear witness to these cultures.

== See also ==
- Fruit picking
- Allotment (gardening)
- Chasselas de Thomery
- Chemin des Longs Sillons

== Bibliography ==
- Auduc, Arlette; Vialles, Jean-Bernard (11 June 2016). Montreuil Patrimoine Horticole. Lieux dits. ISBN 978-2362191312.
- Fruits en majesté, l'histoire du marquage des fruits à la Montreuil. Lume. 2004. ISBN 978-2915474046.
- Savard, Nicole; Brunet, Jacques; Les Savard (2005). Histoires de vies, 1880-1930, histoire illustrée d'une famille d'horticulteurs de Montreuil. Musée de l'histoire vivante. ISBN 9782952541800.
- Discours sur Montreuil. Histoire des murs à pêches, texte original de Roger Schabol, 1771, et texte inédit de Louis Aubin, 1933 (in French). Lume. 2009.
