= Nobling =

Variety of grape

Nobling is a white German wine grape variety that is a crossing between Silvaner and Chasselas. The variety was created in 1940 at the Staatliches Weinbauinstitut Freiburg in Baden-Württemberg by grape breeder Johannes-Friedrich Zimmermann. It is primarily found in the Baden wine region but its number have been declining for most of the late 20th and early 21st century from its high point of 100 hectares (250 acres) in the late 1970s.

== Viticulture ==
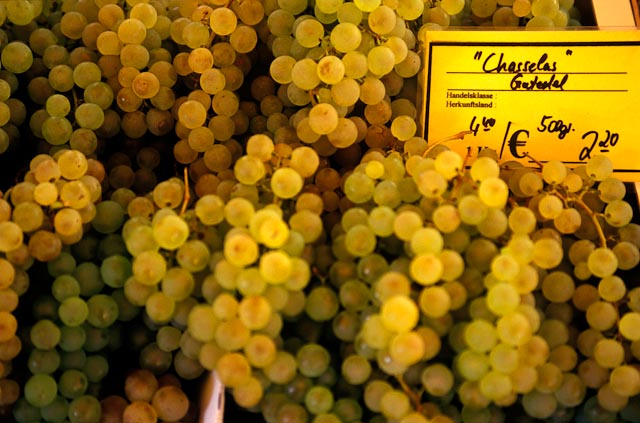
Chasselas, one of the parent varieties of Nobling.

Nobling is a crossing of the Silvaner and Chasselas grape that was bred to ripen in the cooler climate of German wine regions but still retain moderate acidity levels.

== Synonyms ==
In addition to Nobling, the grape is also known under its institute names from the Staatliches Weinbauinstitut Freiburg: FR. 128-40 and Freiburg 128–40.
