= Thomery =

- Commune
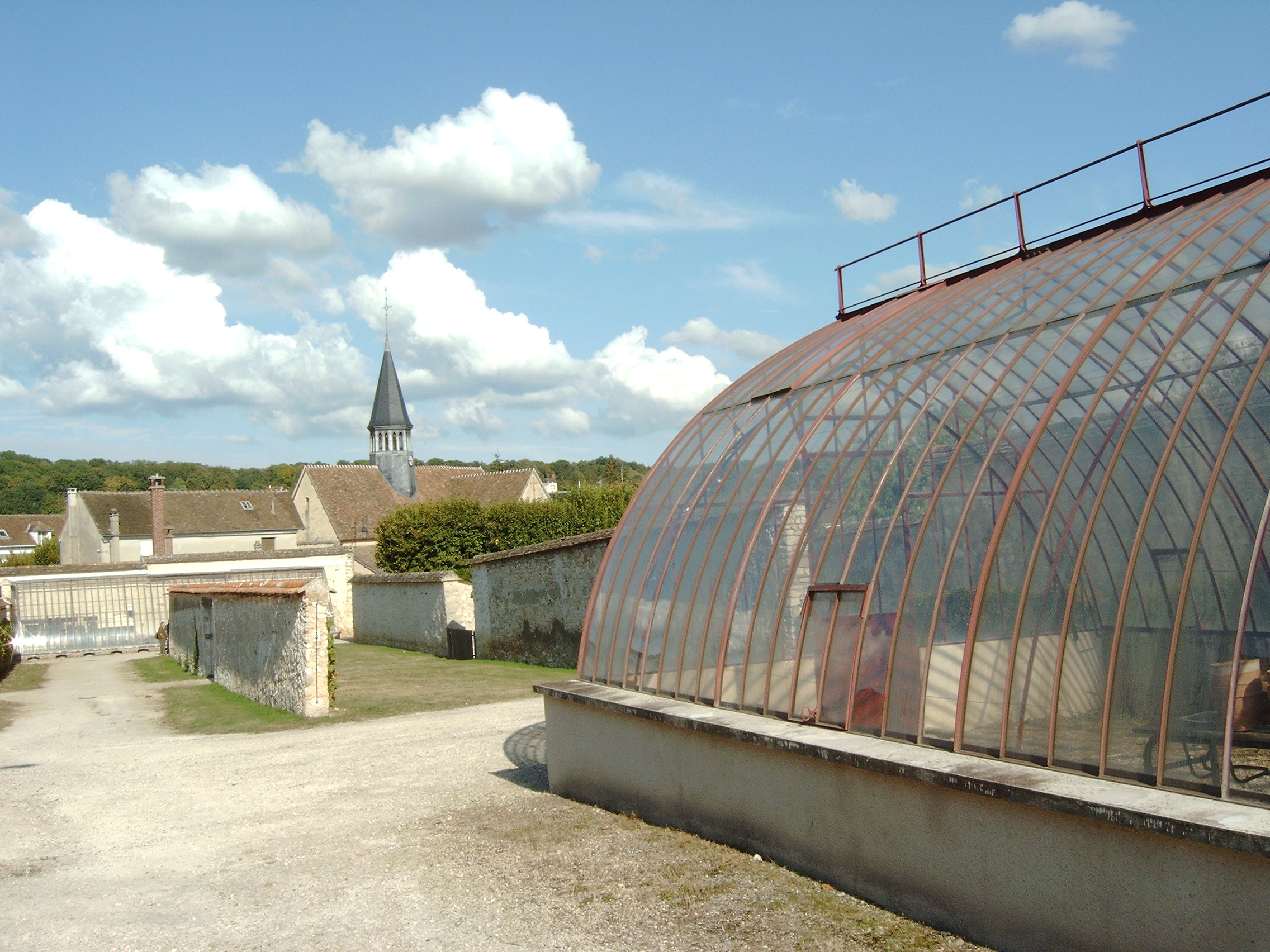
- Salomon vineyard

- Coat of arms
- Location of Thomery
- Location within France Location within Île-de-France (region)
- Coordinates: 48°24′34″N 2°47′04″E
- Country: France
- Region: Île-de-France
- Department: Seine-et-Marne
- Arrondissement: Fontainebleau
- Canton: Montereau-Fault-Yonne
- Intercommunality: Moret Seine et Loing

Government
  - Mayor (2020–2026): Bruno Michel
- Area^{1}: 3.71 km^{2} (1.43 sq mi)
- Highest elevation: 96 m (315 ft)
- Lowest elevation: 42 m (138 ft)
- Population (2023): 3,384
  - Density: 912/km^{2} (2,360/sq mi)
- Time zone: UTC+01:00 (CET)
  - Summer (DST): UTC+02:00 (CEST)
- INSEE/Postal code: 77463 /77810
- ^{1} French Land Register data, which excludes lakes, ponds, glaciers > 1 km^{2} (0.386 sq mi or 247 acres) and river estuaries.

Thomery (French: [tɔmʁi]) is a commune in the Seine-et-Marne department in the Île-de-France region in north-central France, between the forest of Fontainebleau and the river Seine. Thomery station has rail connections to Montereau-Fault-Yonne, Melun and Paris.

== Population ==
Historical population
| Year | Pop. | ±% p.a. |
|---|---|---|
| 1968 | 1,906 | — |
| 1975 | 2,249 | +2.39% |
| 1982 | 2,647 | +2.36% |
| 1990 | 3,025 | +1.68% |
| 1999 | 3,203 | +0.64% |
| 2007 | 3,345 | +0.54% |
| 2012 | 3,443 | +0.58% |
| 2017 | 3,467 | +0.14% |
| 2023 | 3,384 | −0.40% |
Source: INSEE

Inhabitants of Thomery are called Thomeryons in French.

== Economy ==
Over the centuries, Thomery has been home to the Chasselas of Thomery table grapes culture (different from the Moissac's chasselas) performed according to ancestral techniques on high walls. After harvesting, the grapes are disposed in especially designed bottles, filled with water and a charcoal piece, and stored over a period of several months in wine caves or cellars built inside the local houses. This technique allows the grapes to be sold after the Christmas season even as late as Easter with perfectly naturally preserved fruits. This tradition has been extremely popular in from 19th century to World War II, and was destinated to rich tables in Paris (grapes were sold at Fauchon) and beyond (the Russian Csar court was also delivered). The peak of production was in the 1920s with more than 800 tons of grapes a year cultured over a total 350 km (220 mi) of walls. The vine walls are still present in Thomery and have been classified in 1993 by the Monuments historiques. Nowadays, only a few inhabitants are still running the activity for local consumption.

== See also ==
- Communes of the Seine-et-Marne department
- Château de By, a museum in the town
