= Treille =

Treille or La Treille, French for a grapevine or trellis, may refer to:

- La Treille, a Marseille neighborhood
- La Treille, Saint Lucia, a town on the island of Saint Lucia in the Caribbean
- Saint-Hilaire-la-Treille, a village in Haute-Vienne department in central-Western France
- Lille Cathedral, also known as Notre Dame de la Treille, French monument in Lille
- Treille (river), in French department of Loiret, second tributary of Loing river

Treilles may refer to:

- Treilles, a commune in Aude département of southwestern France
- Treilles-en-Gâtinais, a town in the Loiret département or north-central France

== See also ==
- Latreille (surname)
