= Francis Latreille =

French American artist and photographer (born 1948)

Francis Latreille (born January 8, 1948) is a French American artist and photographer who was awarded World Press Photo Award in Amsterdam in 1998 and since 1977 distributed his works in three continents such as Asia, Europe and North America. His works have been published in magazines such as Life, Time, and Newsweek, among others. He also had two exhibition in Washington D.C. one of which was in 2000, the other was three years later. In 1995 he left France Soir newspaper and since 1998 he participated in the mammoth explorations in Siberia.
