= Chasselas =

Variety of grape

Coordinates: 46°17′N 4°43′E

- Grape (Vitis)
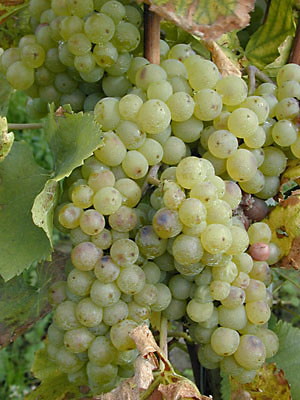
- Chasselas grapes growing in Baden
- Color of berry skin: Blanc
- Species: Vitis vinifera
- Also called: Chasselas blanc, Fendant, Gutedel, and other synonyms
- Notable regions: Switzerland, Baden (Germany), Loire (France)
- VIVC number: 2473

Chasselas (French pronunciation: [ʃasla]) or Chasselas blanc ([ʃasla blɑ̃]) is a wine grape variety grown mainly in Switzerland, France, Germany, Portugal, Hungary, Romania, New Zealand, Croatia and Chile. Chasselas is mostly vinified to be a full, dry and fruity white wine. It is also suitable as a table grape, grown widely for this purpose in Turkey and Hungary.

== History ==
Genetic analyses made in 2009 in a laboratory of the University of Dieppe showed that Chasselas is a grape variety originating in western Switzerland. Its name was first mentioned in the 16th century.

In 1940, Chasselas was crossed with Silvaner to produce the white grape variety Nobling.

== Wine regions ==
Chasselas is widely grown in Switzerland, where it has several regional synonym names, the main one being Fendant in the canton of Valais. It is considered an ideal pairing for raclette or fondue. Chasselas is also known as Perlan in the Mandement district of Geneva. In 2009, it was Switzerland's second-most planted grape variety at 4,013 hectares (9,920 acres).

In Germany, with 1,123 hectares (2,770 acres), it is almost exclusively grown in the wine region of Baden under the name Gutedel.

In France it is mostly grown in the Loire region, where it is blended with Sauvignon blanc to produce a wine called "Pouilly-sur-Loire". Californian and Australian growers know this variety under the names Chasselas Doré and Golden Chasselas.

Michel Chapoutier has stated that he is looking for land for a vineyard in England, which would be planted with Chasselas. He said that he believed Chasselas would suit the English climate and terroir very well.

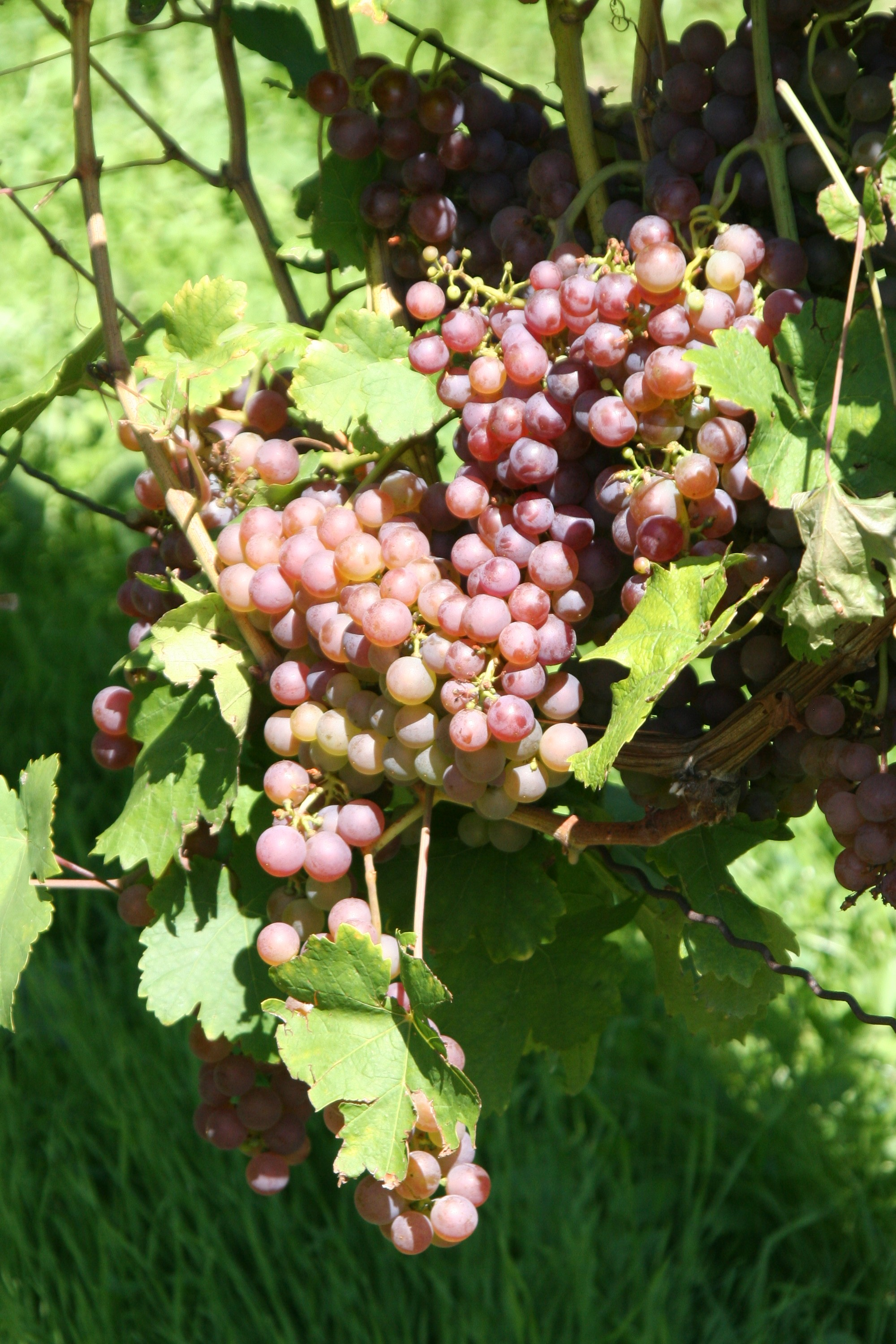
A red-skinned version of Chasselas ripening on the vine

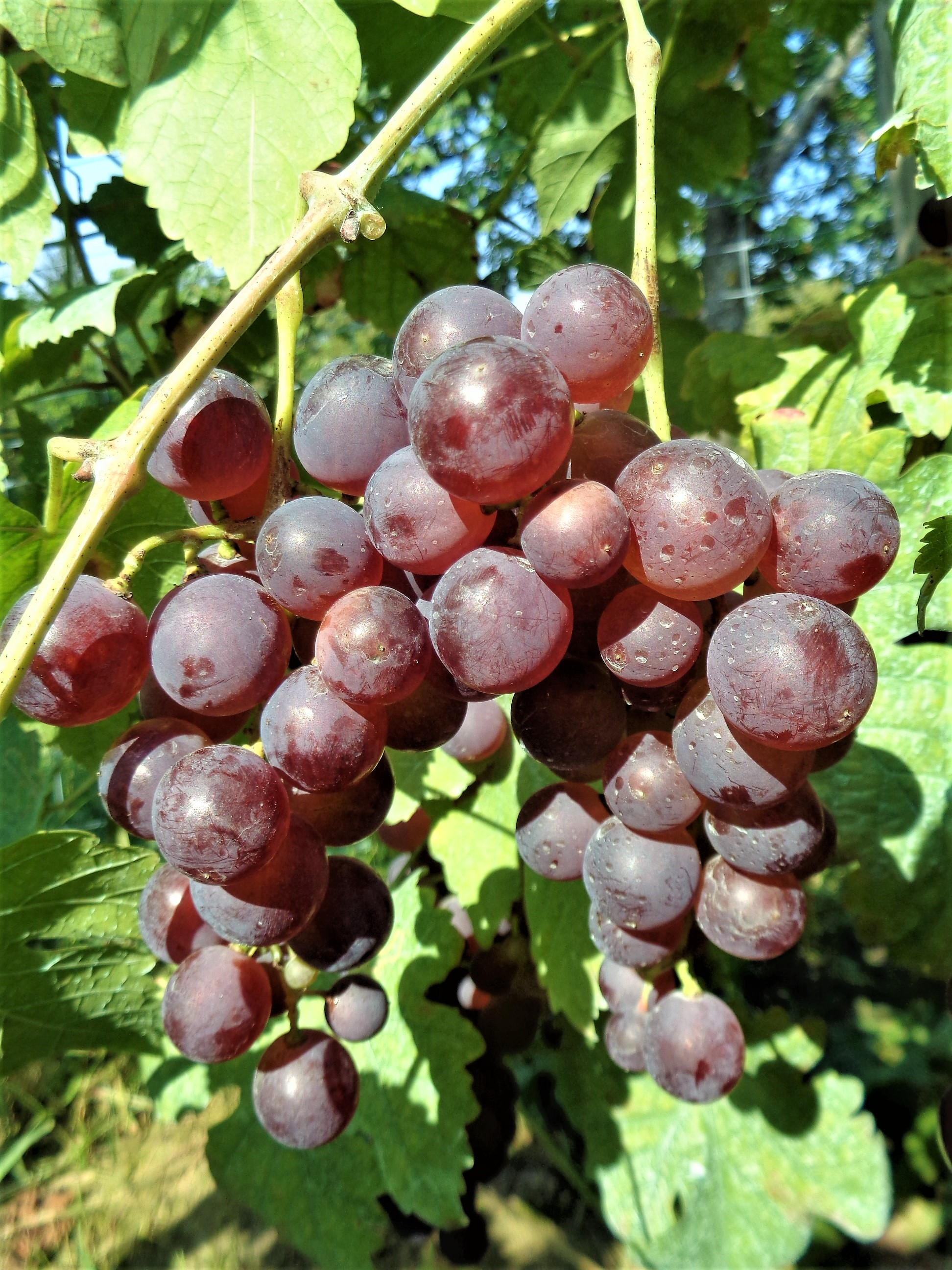
A fully ripe red-skinned Chasselas in Međimurje, northern Croatia

== See also ==
- Chasselas de Thomery
- Viticulture
