= Blauburger =

Variety of grape

- Grape (Vitis)
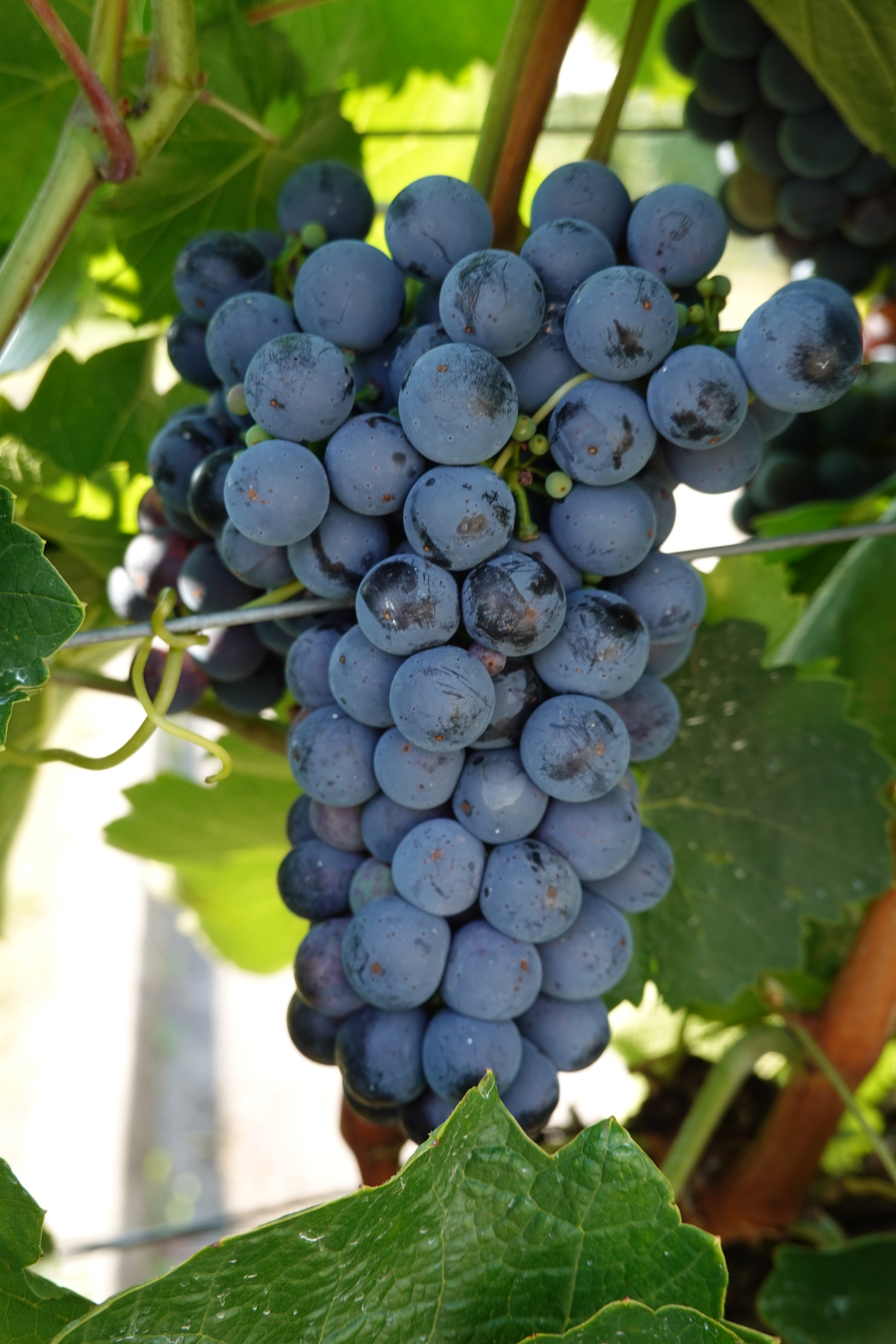
- Color of berry skin: Noir
- Species: Vitis vinifera
- Origin: Austria
- Original pedigree: Blauer Portugieser × Blaufränkisch
- Breeder: Fritz Zweigelt
- Breeding institute: Höhere Bundeslehranstalt und Bundesamt für Wein- und Obstbau (HBLAuBA), Klosterneuburg
- Year of crossing: 1923
- VIVC number: 1457

Blauburger is a red wine grape variety that is grown a little in Austria, Czech Republic and Hungary. It should not be confused with Blauburgunder, which is an Austrian synonym for Pinot noir.

== History ==
Blauburger is a cross between Blauer Portugieser and Blaufränkisch. It was created in 1923 by Dr. Fritz Zweigelt at the Federal Institute for Viticulture and Pomology at Klosterneuburg, Austria.

== Distribution and wines ==
In 1999 there were 883.95 ha of Blauburger grown in Austria. It is also a permitted variety for Egri Bikavér (Bull's Blood) in Hungary. It gives wines of intense color, and some berry fruit on the palate, but with not much bouquet or tannin. It is mostly used for blending.

== Vine and Viticulture ==
Blauburger gives good yields and is particularly resistant to Botrytis cinerea, but is susceptible to mildew.

== See also ==
- Zweigelt
