= Kadarka =

Variety of grape

- Grape (Vitis)
- Color of berry skin: Black
- Species: Vitis vinifera
- Also called: Cadarca, Gamza and (additional synonyms)
- Origin: Shkodër Region in Albania, or Hungary
- Notable regions: Hungary, Romania, Bulgaria, Slovakia
- Notable wines: Szekszárd Kadarka, Egri Bikavér
- VIVC number: 5898

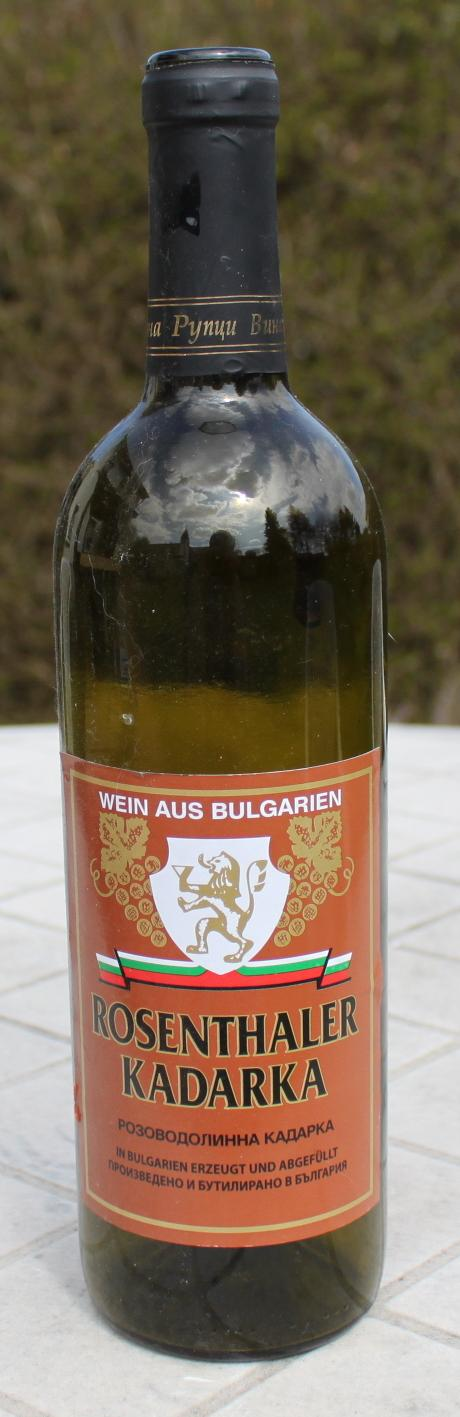
A bottle of Bulgarian "Rosenthaler Kadarka" wine

Cadarca or Kadarka or Gamza is a dark-skinned variety of grape used for red wine. It has a long history and is popular in Romania and Bulgaria, where it is known as Гъмза Gamza. It used to be an important constituent of the Hungarian red cuvée Bull's Blood of Eger or Szekszárd, but has long been in decline in Hungarian plantations, to be replaced by Kékfrankos and Portugieser. It is also grown in most other central European and balkan countries where it is sometimes known as Cadarca or Skadarska.

Kadarka is sometimes assumed to originate from Hungary. Another hypothesis is that is related to the variety Skadarsko, which is supposed to originate from Lake Scutari, which is situated on the border between Albania and Montenegro.

In a recent study, it is claimed that one of the parents of Kadarka is Papazkarası which is grown in Strandja region of Kırklareli.

Cadarca (Kadarka) wine is characterised by full, easily recognizable taste, deep aroma and dark or medium dark colour. Kadarka is often used for cuvees including some of the Egri Bikavérs, and also for production of table wines.

In Bulgaria, Gamza is mostly cultivated in the northwestern and central northern regions, in the Danubian Plain. Until the recent decades, Gamza was the dominant grape varietal in these Bulgarian regions. The main features of Gamza are a large yet compact cluster of small, almost spherical grapes, dark blue to black in colour.

== Synonyms ==
Kadarka is also known under the following synonyms: Backator-Szőlő, Black Kadarka, Blaue Kadarka, Blaue Ungarische, Bleu de Hongrie, Blue Kadarka, Branicevka, Budai Fekete, Cadarca, Cadarca de Minis, Cadarca Neagra, Cadarka, Cedireska, Cerna Ghija, Cerna Giza, Cerna Meco, Cerna Skadarka, Cetereska, Cherna Gizha, Chernina, Chetereshka, Csoka Szőlő, Domanli, Edle Ungartraube, Edler Schwarzblauer Tokayer, Feket Budai, Fekete Czigány, Fekete Zinka, Fűszeres Kadarka, Gamza, Gemza, Gimza, Gmza, Gymza, Jenei Feket, Jenei Fekete, Kadar, Kadarka, Kadarka Blaue, Kadarka Ble, Kadarka Bleu, Kadarka Chernaya, Kadarka Crna, Kadarka Fekete, Kadarka Fűszeres, Kadarka Keck, Kadarka Modra, Kadarka Nemes, Kadarka Nera, Kadarka Noir, Kadarka Rubinrot, Kadarka Schwarz, Kadarka Sinyaya, Kadarkas, Kadarska, Kallmet, Kara Shiralak, Kék Budai, Kékkardarka, Kereszetes Levelű, Keresztes Levelű, Ksoka Szőlő, Ksoko Szőlő, Lúdtalpú, Lugojana, Meco Cerna, Mekis, Mekish, Modra Kadarka, Mor Kadarka, Mórkadarka, Mosler Schwarz, Nazlin Gomza, Nazlun Gamza, Nemes Kadarka, Noble Bleu, Noir de Scutari, Noir de la Moselle, Raisin Noir de Scutari, Raisin Turc, Schwarzer Cadarca. Schwarzer Mosler, Schwarzer Skutariner, Scutariner, Sirena, Siva Gamza, Skadarka, Skadarska, Skakar, Tanka Gamza, Török Szőlő, Törökbúza Szőlő, Törökszőlő, Tokaynero di Scutari, Ungarische Edeltraube, Vodishka Loza, Vodnishka, Vrachansko Cherno, Zelena Gamza, Zherni Shipon.
