= Hitzendorf =

- Municipality
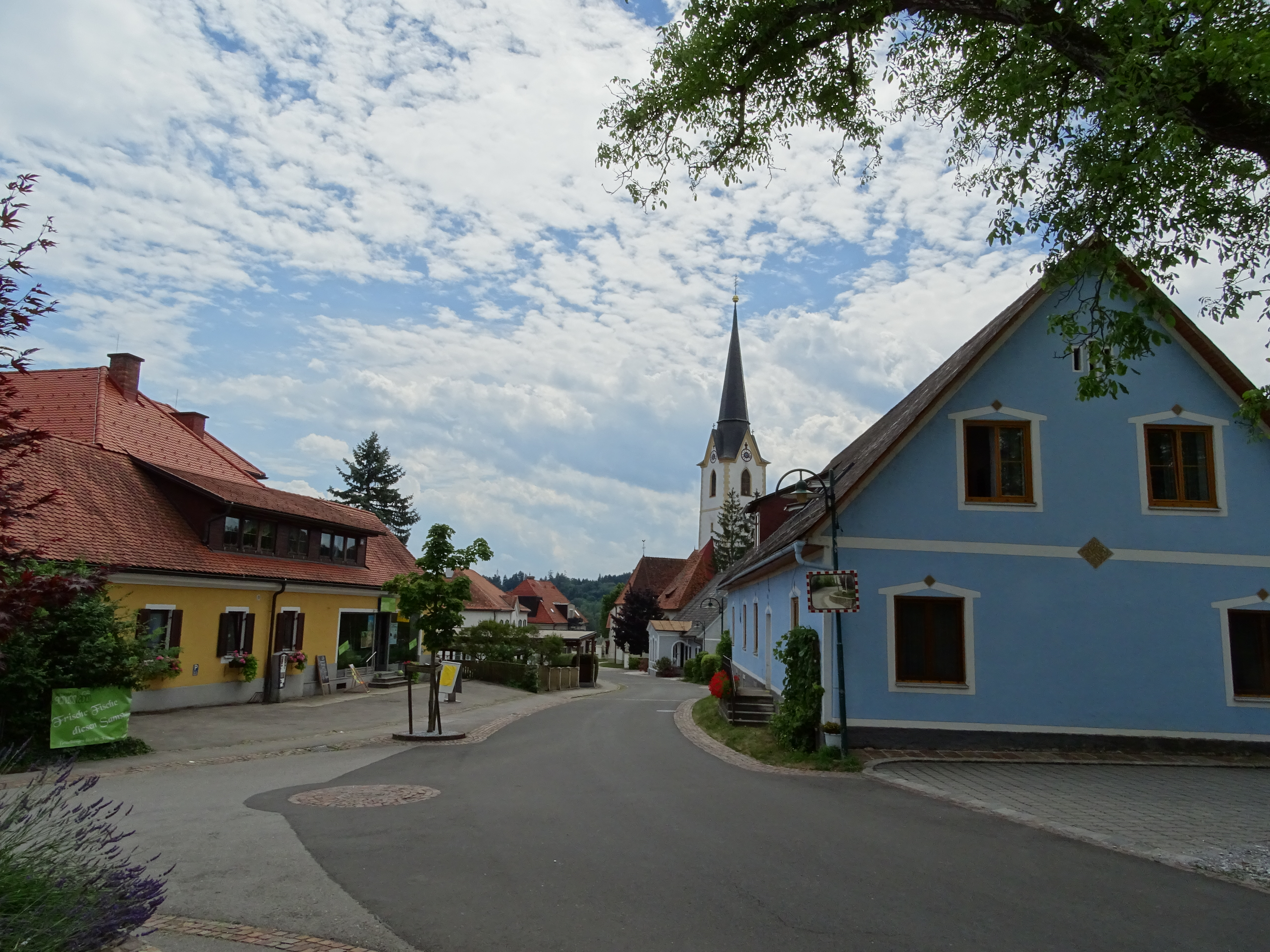

- Coat of arms

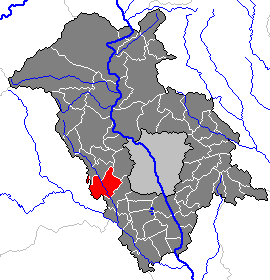
- Location within Graz-Umgebung district

- Location within Austria
- Coordinates: 47°02′07″N 15°18′03″E
- Country: Austria
- State: Styria
- District: Graz-Umgebung

Government
  - Mayor: Thomas Gschier (ÖVP)

Area
  - Total: 48.82 km^{2} (18.85 sq mi)
- Elevation: 383 m (1,257 ft)

Population (2018-01-01)
  - Total: 7,134
  - Density: 146.1/km^{2} (378.5/sq mi)
- Time zone: UTC+1 (CET)
  - Summer (DST): UTC+2 (CEST)
- Postal code: 8151
- Area code: +43 3137
- Vehicle registration: GU
- Website: www.hitzendorf.at

Hitzendorf is a municipality in the district of Graz-Umgebung in the Austrian state of Styria.

== Geography ==
=== Municipal divisions ===
The municipality comprises Altenberg, Altreiteregg, Berndorf, Doblegg, Hitzendorf, Höllberg, Holzberg, Mayersdorf, Michlbach, Neureiteregg, Niederberg, Oberberg and Pirka.

== Demographics ==
Historical population
Year	Pop.	±%
1869	2,279	—
1880	2,332	+2.3%
1890	2,252	−3.4%
1900	2,261	+0.4%
1910	2,264	+0.1%
1923	2,230	−1.5%
1934	2,300	+3.1%
1939	2,169	−5.7%
1951	2,293	+5.7%
1961	2,378	+3.7%
1971	2,703	+13.7%
1981	2,823	+4.4%
1991	3,051	+8.1%
2001	3,412	+11.8%

== Politics ==
The municipal council (Gemeinderat) is composed of 25 members and, following the 2025 Styrian local elections, represents the following parties:

- Austrian People's Party (ÖVP): 11 seats
- Social Democratic Party of Austria (SPÖ): 4 seats
- Freedom Party of Austria (FPÖ): 4 seats
- We Hitzendorfer - Team Markus Dirnberger (WIR): 3 seats
- The Greens - The Green Alternative (GRÜNE): 3 seats

The mayor of Hitzendorf is Thomas Gschier (ÖVP).

== Notable people ==
Fritz Zweigelt, breeder of the Zweigelt red wine grape variety, was born here in 1888.
