= Fritz Zweigelt =

Austrian entomologist and phytologist (1888–1964)

Friedrich Zweigelt
- Born: 13 January 1888; Hitzendorf, Austria-Hungary
- Died: 18 September 1964 (aged 76); Graz, Austria
- Education: University of Graz
- Known for: Breeding the Zweigelt and Blauburger grapevines
- Scientific career
- Fields: Viticulture

Friedrich Zweigelt (13 January 1888 – 18 September 1964) was an Austrian entomologist and phytologist. Zweigelt was one of the most influential and internationally renowned figures in Austrian vine growing between 1921 and 1945. He was Head of State Vine Cultivation during the period of the First Austrian Republic and also acted as Director of the School of Viticulture and Horticulture in Klosterneuburg near Vienna. The grape variety "Blauer Zweigelt" is named after him. Blauer Zweigelt is grown across an area of some 6,400 hectares in Austria, making it by far the most significant red wine grape cultivated in the country. Zweigelt's National Socialist sympathies and activities did not come to the attention of the public for some decades.

== Biography ==
=== 1888–1933 ===
Friedrich Zweigelt was born in Hitzendorf near Graz in Styria on 13 January 1888. In 1912, he entered the services of the Imperial School of Viticulture and Horticulture in Klosterneuburg near Vienna, Austria's first and only state-owned vine cultivation station. After gaining a doctorate in entomology, he was appointed Head of this institute in 1921. Zweigelt's first crossings (undertaken from 1921) included a seedling given the cultivation number 71 (St. Laurent x Blaufränkisch). This particular hybrid proved highly promising from an early stage. In 1922, Zweigelt also successfully crossed Welschriesling with Orangetraube (creating a variety which was to be included in the Austrian Grape Variety Index for Qualitätsweine (Quality Wines) as "Goldburger" in 1978). This was followed by a Blauer Portugieser x Blaufränkisch crossing in 1923 (added to the Austrian Grape Variety Index for Qualitätsweine (Quality Wines) as "Blauburger" in 1978).

Zweigelt had also been editing the journal Das Weinland since 1929. There was soon no other viticulture specialist in Austria who enjoyed better international connections and renown. From the late 1920s onwards, Zweigelt began to join forces with all leading experts from Europe's major wine growing countries to promote the production of quality wine and to try to stem the cultivation of so-called direct producers. His book on direct producers, co-authored with Albert Stummer (Nikolsburg), remains a standard work right down to the present day.

=== 1933-1945 ===
Zweigelt was a strong German nationalist who was deeply opposed to clericalism. He saw himself as a "borderer", and began to view Nazi Germany as a place of yearning after 1933. Zweigelt joined the Austrian NSDAP and remained loyal to the party, even during the period when it was banned.

Following the annexation of Austria in March 1938, it seemed that Zweigelt's dream was about to become true. He would be able to lead "his" Klosterneuburg to new heights as a sister institute to the much larger State School of Viticulture, Fruit Growing and Horticulture in Geisenheim am Rhein. In his capacity as Head and subsequently (after 1943) Director of Klosterneuburg, Zweigelt did everything he possibly could to turn the institute into a "stronghold of National Socialism". However, he began to be caught between the different fronts. Adherents of the Austro-Fascist Dollfuß-Schuschnigg regime were keen to prevent his rise, and they were not alone in this aspiration. Zweigelt also found himself in the way of other rival colleagues who had only recently embraced the ideas of National Socialism. However, during the summer of 1938, he succeeded in forcing numerous undesirable teaching staff members to leave the school. These were then replaced by dyed-in-the-wool National Socialists. The Nazi Government in Germany adopted the most progressive viticulture policies in the world and soon gained international recognition. The culmination and end of this development occurred at an international viticulture congress staged in Bad Kreuznach in late August 1939. Zweigelt, now elevated to the status of Reich Official, was one of the participants.

Despite numerous personal disappointments, Zweigelt clung firmly to his National Socialist convictions until 1945. He often expressed such views to his pupil body in addresses that were full of drastic warlike rhetoric. "Das Weinland", the journal he edited, had been the mouthpiece of Austrian viticulture since 1929. In 1943, however, publication ceased by order of the Reichsnährstand (a government body set up in Nazi Germany to regulate food production) in Berlin. Zweigelt's only son Rudolf was conscripted into the German army upon completion of his medical studies. He was killed in East Prussia in 1944, and Zweigelt would never get over his death.

=== After 1945 ===
After the collapse of the Third Reich, Zweigelt was held in a detention camp in Klosterneuburg. During this time of imprisonment, he portrayed himself as an idealist who had been led astray. Nevertheless, after various sessions of questioning and examinations of witnesses, criminal proceedings were instigated against Zweigelt at the end of 1945. He was summoned to stand trial at the Volksgericht in Vienna ("Volksgerichte" were special courts set up in Austria after the Second World War to deal with crimes committed under National Socialism). A pupil named Josef Bauer (born in 1920) had been arrested by the Gestapo for being a member of the "Austrian Freedom Movement", a group founded by Roman Scholz, an Augustinian canon regular at Klosterneuburg. Bauer had then been expelled from the institute, but this circumstance was not mentioned by anyone at the time.

In 1948, Federal President Karl Renner (SPÖ) ordered that the criminal proceedings pending against Friedrich Zweigelt should be discontinued and that Zweigelt should be pardoned. He was thus deemed to have been a "lesser offender", but did not return to employment in the public sector because of his advanced age. Zweigelt spent his final years in Graz, where he died on 18 September 1964 some years after the death of his wife Friederike (Fritzi). He was buried in the St. Peter City Cemetery in Graz.

Starting in 2002, an annual Dr Fritz Zweigelt Wine Tasting Prize was awarded to estates in the Kamptal Region. This prize was last conferred in 2015, after which time it was discontinued in the wake of severe criticism.

== The "Zweigelt" grape variety ==
Zweigelt's long-standing staff members Paul Steingruber and Leopold Müller resurrected vine cultivation at Klosterneuburg after the war and went on to produce a St. Laurent x Blaufränkisch crossing. This was described as being "of a magnificent colour, with an excellent taste and smell, a splendid red wine variety." Zweigelt's pupil and admirer Lenz Moser propagated the plant material at his vine nursery and introduced self-rooted cuttings onto the sales market from 1960 onwards.

The official designation "Zweigeltrebe Blau" appeared for the first time in 1972, when the new Grape Variety Index for Qualitätsweine (Quality Wines) was launched. The name of the variety was altered to "Blauer Zweigelt" in 1978. At the request of the School of Viticulture and Horticulture in Klosterneuburg, the synonym "Rotburger" was created at the same time. The aim here was to make it clear that the new cultivations of Blauburger, Goldburger and Rotburger/Blauer Zweigelt all shared a common origin. The "Institut ohne direkte Eigenschaften" (lit. "institute without direct characteristics", an Austrian artist collective) made a proposal in 2018 to rename the grape variety to "Blauer Montag" (lit. "Blue Monday") – alluding to Zweigelt's national socialist past.

== See also ==
- List of wine personalities
