= Egri Bikavér =

Red wine (cuvée) from Eger, Hungary

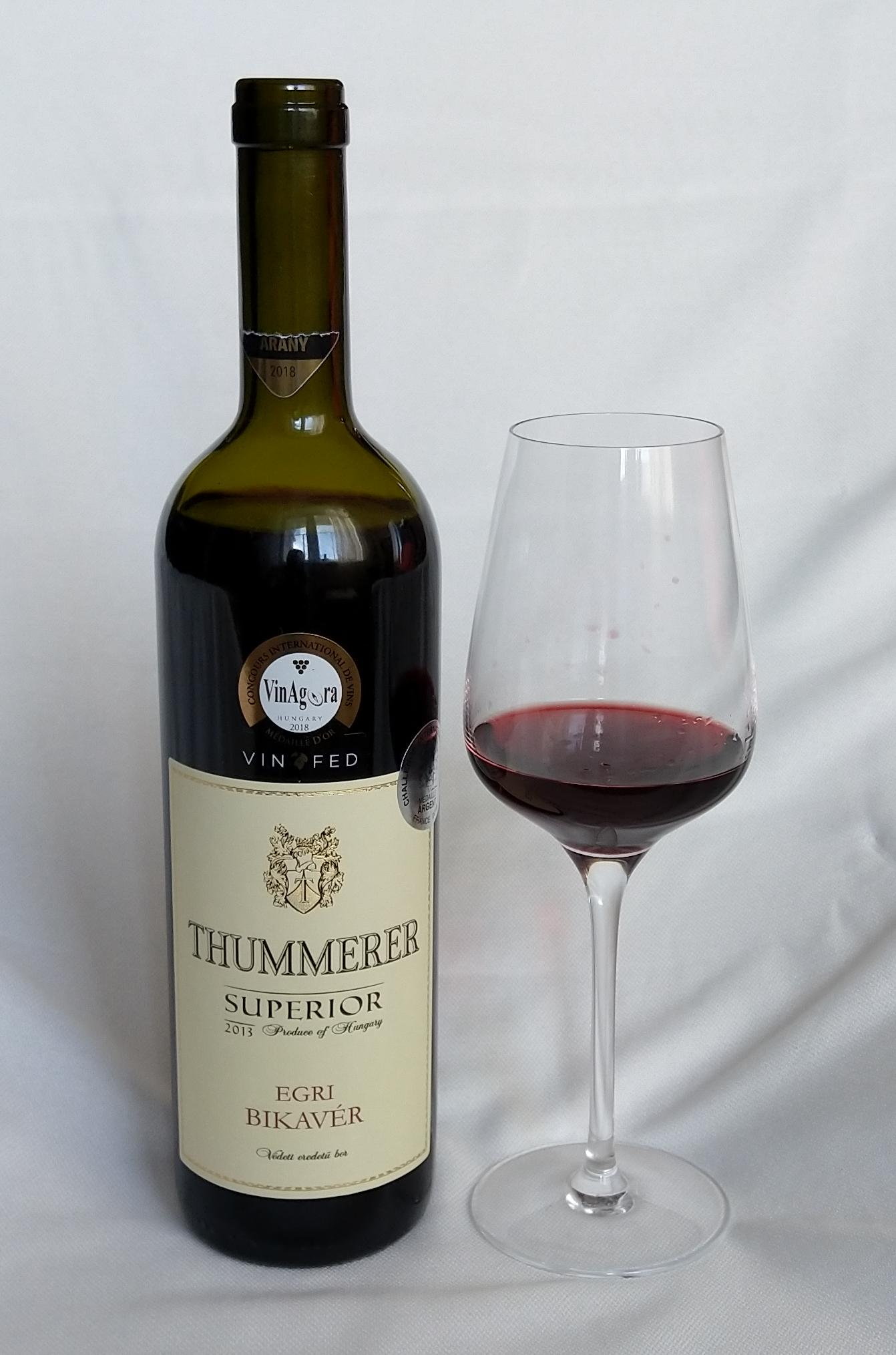
A bottle of Egri Bikavér

Egri Bikavér (Bull's Blood of Eger) is a blended red wine produced in Eger, Hungary. It is very representative of the red wines of Eger, a terroir wine, which carries the flavour of the soils of local production sites, the mezzo-climate unique to the region and the traditions and mores of local residents, from the selection of varieties to choosing the period and method of grape processing and mellowing.

The exact date of the emergence of Egri Bikavér is unknown. One thing is certain; the word Bikavér (bull's blood) was recorded as early as the beginning of the 19th century. Under the name Bikavér, full-bodied red wines were sold, not only in Eger and Szekszárd but other places as well. Legends grew up around the name, which tied it to the 1552 siege of Eger as related by Gárdonyi Géza. In its present form, also accepted by the public, Egri Bikavér is associated with the name of Grőber Jenő, Eger vigneron. Sugár István (1981) writes: 'I have searched different sources for the composition of grape types constituting bull's blood. The earliest record dates back to 1912, when, in addition to kadarka, I have found blue frank, cabernet and merlot'.

Contemporary vignerons and winemakers have been refining the conditions of the production, name, classification and control of this wine for the past two decades. The result of this activity is that Egri Bikavér became the first quality wine in Hungary's history to be produced in a specified region. (Egri Bikavér Regulation of 1997)

At present, Egri Bikavér is produced in accordance with a regulation designating 3 tiers of quality: classicus, superior and grand superior. The product description contains the rules of yield restriction, fermentation sur marc, aging in barrels and bottles, as well as the marketing and trading of the wines, for the different tiers.

Egri Bikavér is a Kékfrankos-based dry red wine blend, ranging from garnet red to deep ruby, with flavours and aromas presenting rich, spicy and fruity characteristics, without a tannin accent. Aging and fresh fruit aromas are both characteristic of the wine; its complexity is well illustrated by the fact that the characteristic feature of the wine is that no single grape type can dominate the wine in question. Due to the riper, more concentrated grape produce, as well as the extended aging in barrels and bottles, Superior and Grand Superior wines have marked aromas of mellowing, lasting flavours, full body and a long shelf-life with minerality and ideas in harmony with the production areas (sites). The difference between them is usually manifested in the fullness and duration of the aroma.

== Blend ==
Egri Bikavér is a blend that has varied over the years, although the blend is anchored by the ancient Kékfrankos variety.

Officially Egri Bikavér must contain at least three of the following 13 grapes:

Bíbor kadarka, Blauburger, Cabernet franc, Cabernet sauvignon, Kadarka, Kékfrankos, Kékoportó, Menoire, Merlot, Pinot noir, Syrah, Turán, Zweigelt

== History ==
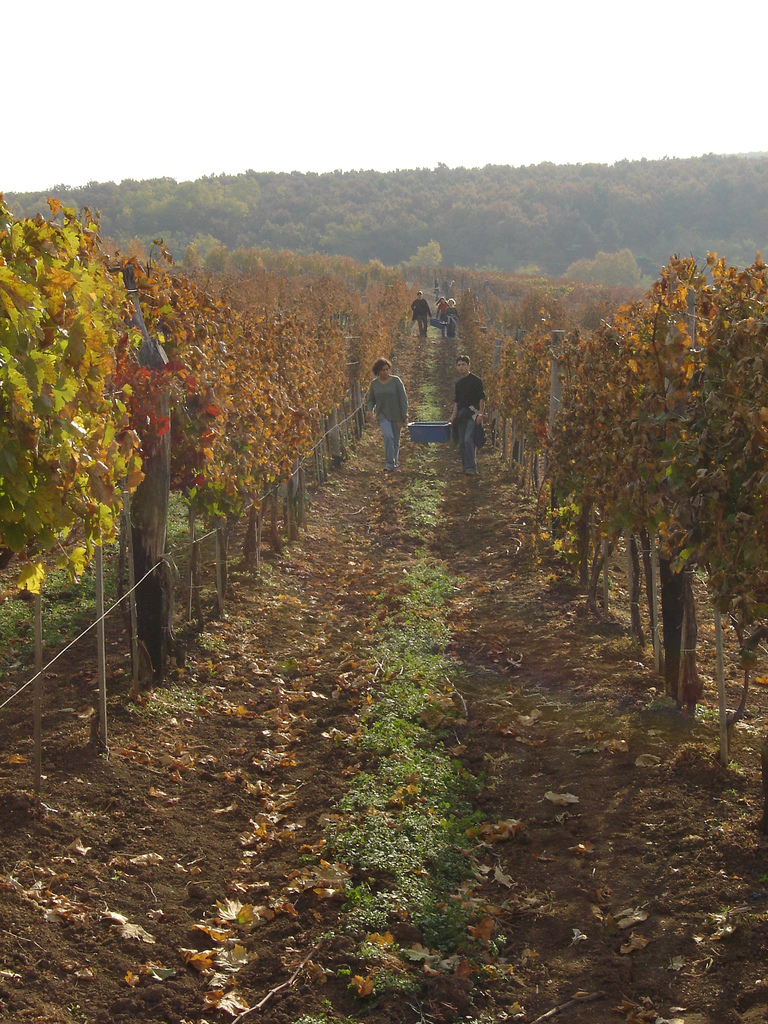
A vineyard in Eger, where Bikavér is produced

Under the Turks, the Hungarians' traditional white grapes were replaced by Kadarka and its relatives. In the 18th century German immigrants brought with them the Blauer Portugieser. Hungary did not escape the effects of the phylloxera epidemic in 1882, after which Kékfrankos and small amounts of the Bordeaux varieties were introduced. At this time the different varieties were often grown together as field blends in the vineyard, and vinified together; towards the end of the 19th century they began to be processed separately into wine and then blended.

Under Communism, Kadarka was largely replaced by the Bordeaux varieties and in particular the easy-to-grow Zweigelt. This and the industrialisation of production saw Egri Bikavér become a much lighter, simpler wine during the 1970s and 1980s.

Following the fall of Communism, much Kadarka has been planted and since the mid-1990s there has been a return to a more traditional, much darker style of wine. In order to eliminate some quality problems, a stricter regulation was planned in the mid 90s. The regulation was introduced in 1997, thus Hungary's first Districtus Hungaricus Controllatus - DHC was created (similar to the French Appellation d'Origine Controllée (AOC) or more like the Austrian Districtus Austriae Controllatus (DAC) system), enacting the rule specifying that Egri Bikavér must contain 3 out of 11 traditional grape varieties.

== Egri Bikavér Superior ==
In 2004 a new level, Egri Bikavér Superior was introduced. In this case, at least 5 out of the 13 recommended varieties must be used and also a lower yield must be applied (maximum 60 hl/ha). It needs to age at least 12 months in wooden cask and 6 months in bottle before releasing on the market. Regulations on the composition of the blend, the wine making technology and minimum alcohol level also differs from normal Egri Bikavér. All those regulations are aiming for an overall higher quality wine.

The raw materials necessary for the production of this wine can be produced only in the Eger district of the wine region, within that only in blue grape plantations with grape cadastre over 300 points, by abiding by the minimum must level (18-20 M/M) and maximum production quantity (80 q/ha) described in the rules and regulations. The wine, which is to be produced through the proportionate blending of at least four kinds, is to be mellowed in oak barrels and is to be bottled after the first day of November of the year following the harvest, following preliminary classification. After mellowing in bottles for six months, and following yet another classification, the wine can be marketed. The vitality of this wine can already be guessed from its colour. In its warm, spicy fragrance, the different fruits are mixed, which is completed by a harmony nice in flavours, fine structure and round tannins, with a long and playful subsiding.

== Drinking ==
Despite considerable investment in vineyards and wineries, Egri Bikavér is still quite variable. The difference in quality between good ones and the cheap mass-market versions can be immense. High-quality Egri Bikavér requires two or three years of oak aging, and is best with game, beef, or other spicy food. Egri Bikavér should be served at 15-17 °C.

== Wineries ==
http://egriborvidek.hu/hu/pinceszetek-borozok
