= Portan =

Variety of grape

- Grape (Vitis)
- Color of berry skin: Noir
- Species: Vitis vinifera
- Also called: E.M. 1508-25
- Origin: France
- Original pedigree: Grenache noir × Blauer Portugieser
- Breeder: Paul Truel
- Breeding institute: Institut National de la Recherche Agronomique - Unité Expérimentale du Domaine de Vassal & Montpellier SupAgro
- Year of crossing: 1958
- VIVC number: 9612

Portan is a red French wine grape planted primarily in the Languedoc. The grape is a crossing of Grenache and Portugais, being bred with the aim of ripening more reliably than Grenache.

== Synonyms ==
The only synonym of Portan is its breeding code E.M. 1508-25.
