= Blaufränkisch =

Variety of grape

- Grape (Vitis)
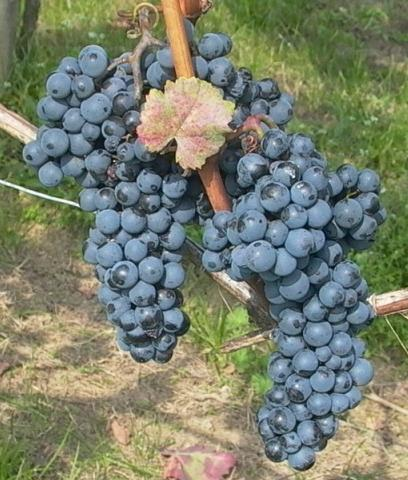
- Blaufränkisch grapes growing in Burgenland, Austria
- Species: Vitis vinifera
- Also called: modra frankinja, Lemberger, Blauer Limberger, Frankovka (Franconia), Kékfrankos, Gamé
- Origin: Lower Styria (now part of Slovenia)
- Original pedigree: Gouais blanc (Weißer Heunisch; male parent) × Blaue Zimmettraube
- Pedigree parent 1: Gouais blanc
- Pedigree parent 2: Blaue Zimmettraube
- Notable regions: Sopron, Villány, Szekszárd and Eger
- Notable wines: Egri Bikavér
- VIVC number: 1459

Blaufränkisch (German pronunciation: [ˈblaʊ̯ˌfʁɛŋkɪʃ]; German for blue Frankish) is a dark-skinned variety of grape used for red wine. Blaufränkisch, which is a late-ripening variety, produces red wines which are typically rich in tannin and may exhibit a pronounced spicy character.

The grape is grown across Central Europe, including Austria, the Czech Republic (in particular southern Moravia where it is known as Frankovka), Germany, Slovakia (where it is known as Frankovka modrá), Croatia, Serbia (frankovka), Slovenia (known as modra frankinja), and Italy (Franconia). In Hungary the grape is called Kékfrankos (also lit. blue Frankish) and is grown in a number of wine regions including Sopron, Villány, Szekszárd, and Eger (where it is a major ingredient in the famous red wine blend known as Egri Bikavér (lit. Bull's Blood) having largely replaced the Kadarka grape). It has been called "the Pinot noir of the East" because of its spread and reputation in Eastern Europe. In America the grape is also known as Lemberger, Blauer Limberger or Blue Limberger and grown in Pennsylvania, Washington state, Michigan, New Jersey, Idaho, New York, Colorado, Ohio, Virginia. and California,

DNA profiling has shown that Blaufränkisch is a cross between Gouais blanc (Weißer Heunisch; male parent) and Blaue Zimmettraube (female parent; the offspring of Blauer Gänsfüsser). Historical sources of grapevine classification have provided very solid evidence that the geographic area of origin of the variety is Lower Styria (today Slovenian Styria). For a long time before the application of DNA analysis, Blaufränkisch was erroneously thought to be a clone of the Gamay grape variety, due to certain similarities in morphology and possibly due to its name Gamé in Bulgaria.

The German name Lemberger derives from the fact that it was imported to Germany in the 19th century from Lemberg in Lower Styria in present-day Slovenia and then in the Austro-Hungarian Empire. An 1877 export of Lembergerreben to Germany has been recorded. The almost identical name Limberger refers to Limburg at Maissau in Lower Austria, where in the late 19th century "ungrafted Limberg Blaufränkisch vines" (wurzelechte Limberger Blaufränkisch-Reben) were offered for sale.

== History and origins ==
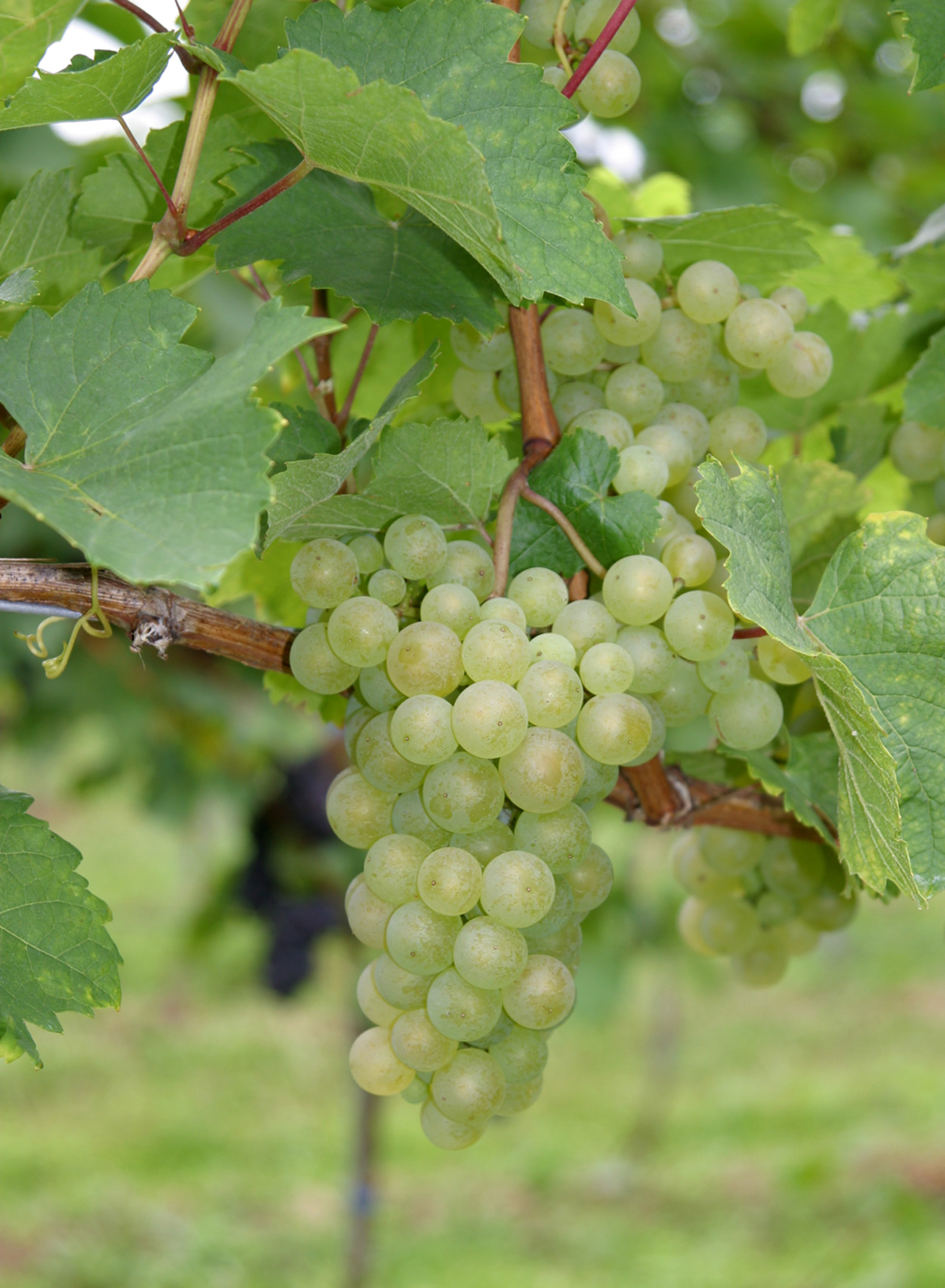
DNA analysis has shown that Blaufränkisch is a crossing of Gouais blanc (pictured) and another unknown variety.

While the first officially documented appearance of Blaufränkisch did not occur until 1862 when the grape was included in a viticultural exposition in Vienna, Austria, it is likely that the grape is much older and has perhaps been around as long as the Middle Ages under a variety of Fränkisch synonyms. The term Fränkisch itself comes from Franconia, the German wine region that includes northwest Bavaria, the northeastern reaches of Baden-Württemberg around Heilbronn-Franken, and parts of southern Thuringia. During the Middle Ages, the wine from this region was highly praised, and grapes that were thought to be capable of producing superior wines were called Fränkisch to distinguish them from the less highly prized Hunnic grapes. It is likely that from sometime during this period up until the 1900s, Blaufränkisch (literally Blue Frankish) began to be grown in the region.

Despite the close association to Franconia, ampelographers believe that the grape likely originated somewhere in a swath of land stretching from Dalmatia through Austria and Hungary. They base this belief on the proliferation of synonyms originating from these areas as well as DNA evidence showing that the old Hungarian wine grape Kékfrankos was, in fact, Blaufränkisch, and that Gouais blanc (Weisser Heunisch) and an unknown grape variety are the parent varieties of Blaufränkisch. Despite its French name, it has been speculated that Gouais blanc has Eastern European origins, with the term "Heunisch" thought to derive from the Huns, and Gouais blanc being confirmed as a parent variety of another old Hungarian wine grape Furmint, but ultimately the exact birthplace of both Gouais blanc and Blaufränkisch are unknown.

The synonyms Lemberger and Limberger first appeared in literature near the end of the 19th century in relation to the grape's believed origins from the Austro-Hungarian cities of Lemberg (today in modern Slovenia) and Limberg (today known as Maissau) in Lower Austria. In 1875, the International Ampelographic Commission in Colmar, France adopted Blaufränkisch as an officially sanctioned name.

== Viticulture ==
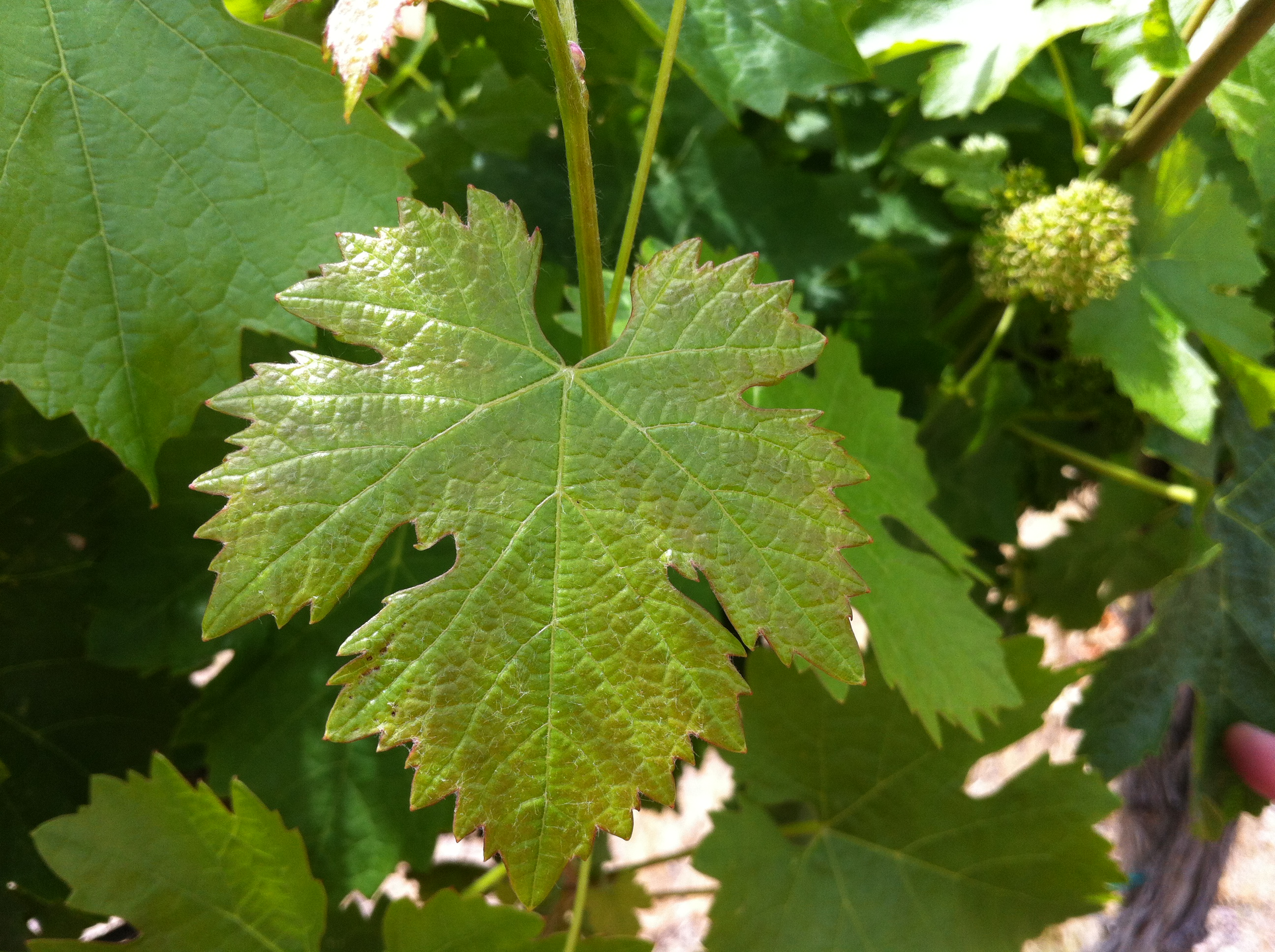
Blaufränkisch leaf from Red Willow Vineyard in Washington State

The Blaufränkisch vine is known as an early budding variety that can be susceptible to early spring frost. It is a late ripening variety, and tends to be planted in warmer vineyard sites. Among the viticultural hazards that Blaufränkisch is most prone to are powdery and downy mildews.

Blaufränkisch is considered a high productive vine capable of producing high yields fairly easily. In some parts of Europe it is not uncommon to see it harvested at 100 hectolitres per hectare (4,300 US quarts per acre). However over-cropping the vine has a tendency to produce thin wines with many green, weedy notes.

== Wine regions ==
Today Blaufränkisch is planted across the globe from Japan, the United States and Australia to Germany, Hungary and Austria.

=== Austria ===
Blaufränkisch is widely grown throughout the Burgenland region of eastern Austria.

It is possible that Blaufränkisch or a similar forerunner of the grape was already cultivated in regions of present Austria (Lower Austria and Burgenland) in the 10th century. In his 1777 publication Beschreibung der in der Wiener Gegend gemeinen Weintrauben-Arten, ampelographer Sebastian Helbling accounted the variety as one of the best red grape varieties of Lower Austria, and used the name Schwarze Fränkische for it.

In present-day Austria Blaufränkisch is the second most important red grape variety after Zweigelt, with 3,340 planted hectares (8,300 acres), representing 6% of all Austrian plantings in 2008. The vast majority of these plantings are in the Burgenland region of eastern Austria. It is particularly common in Mittelburgenland, with 1,194 hectares (2,950 acres) planted in 2008, an area sometimes given the nickname "Blaufränkischland". The Mittelburgenland is considered ideal for the grape due to the dry warm winds from the east across the Pannonian Plain, and the sheltering influence of the hill regions to the north, south and west of the region.

Outside the Burgenland, 807 hectares (1,990 acres) of Blaufränkisch were planted in the Neusiedlersee region, and 962 hectares (2,380 acres) were planted in the Neusiedlersee-Hügelland region in the hill country bordering the lake. The wines produced in this region, influenced by the warm moderating climate of the lake, tend to be, as described by wine expert and Master of Wine Jancis Robinson, "richer and more full bodied", while the clay vineyard soils south of the lake in the Südburgenland tend to produce wines with more spice notes.

In the Carnuntum area located between Vienna and the Neusiedlersee, the slate-based soils near the city of Spitzerberg are also home to some Blaufränkisch plantings.

==== Districtus Austriae Controllatus and wine styles ====
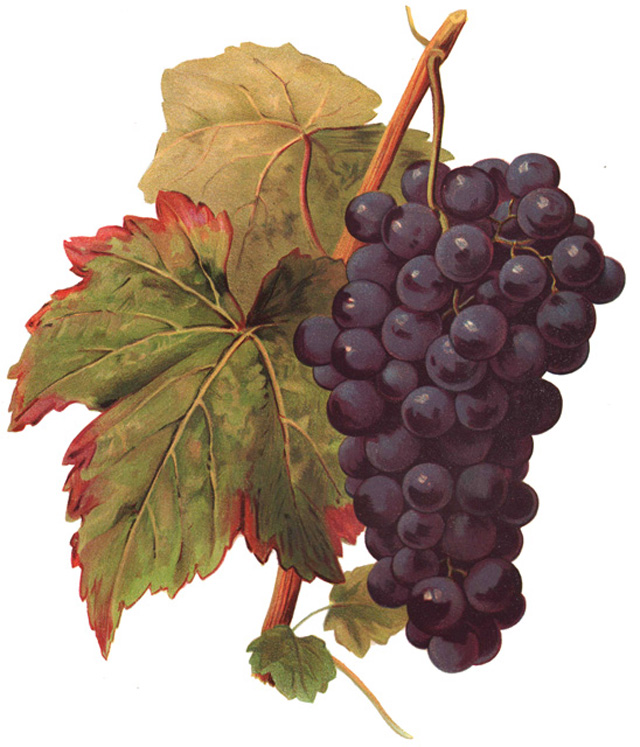
In the Leithaberg DAC, Blaufränkisch is often blended with St. Laurent (pictured).

Within Austria Blaufränkisch is a permitted variety in several Districtus Austriae Controllatus (DAC) zones. Producers in the Burgenland tend to delineate light bodied, unoaked Blaufränkisch wines to the Mittleburgenland DAC Classic, while labeling more full bodied, oaked styles as Burgenland DAC Reserve.

In the Eisnberg DAC of the southern Südburgenland, the grape is grown in iron-rich soils and tends to produce a distinctive varietal style. In the Leithaberg DAC situated in the slate and limestone hills around the Leitha Mountains, Blaufränkisch must make up at least 85% of the blend, with St. Laurent, Zweigelt or Pinot noir permitted to round out the remaining portion. In this cooler climate wine region the Blaufränkisch tends to be, as described by Robinson, "nervy and elegant".

In Austria, Blaufränkisch tends to produce deeply colored wines with dark fruit aromas, peppery spice notes and moderate to high acidity. Depending on where it is produced the wine can be unoaked, or spend some time aging in the barrel. The unoaked styles tend to be lighter bodied while the oaked versions tend to be fuller bodied.

=== Other European wine regions ===
In Germany, there are 1,729 hectares (4,270 acres) of Blaufränkisch, grown primarily in the Württemberg wine region around the town of Stuttgart. Here, where the grape is often known as Blauer Lemberger or Blauer Limberger, the grape tends to make more light bodied wines with softer tannins than the style typically made in Austria.

Blaufränkisch, known here as Frankovka, is the second most widely grown red grape variety in the Czech Republic. It is grown only in the Moravian wine subregions due to its late-ripening nature. Almost 9% of the total vineyard area in Slovakia (1,742 hectares or 4,300 acres) is planted to Blaufränkisch, where the grape is more widely known as Frankovka modrá. In the city of Bratislava, specifically the suburb of Rača, local wine producers hold an annual wine festival that highlights Frankovka modrá wines from the region as well as examples of Blaufränkisch from around the globe.

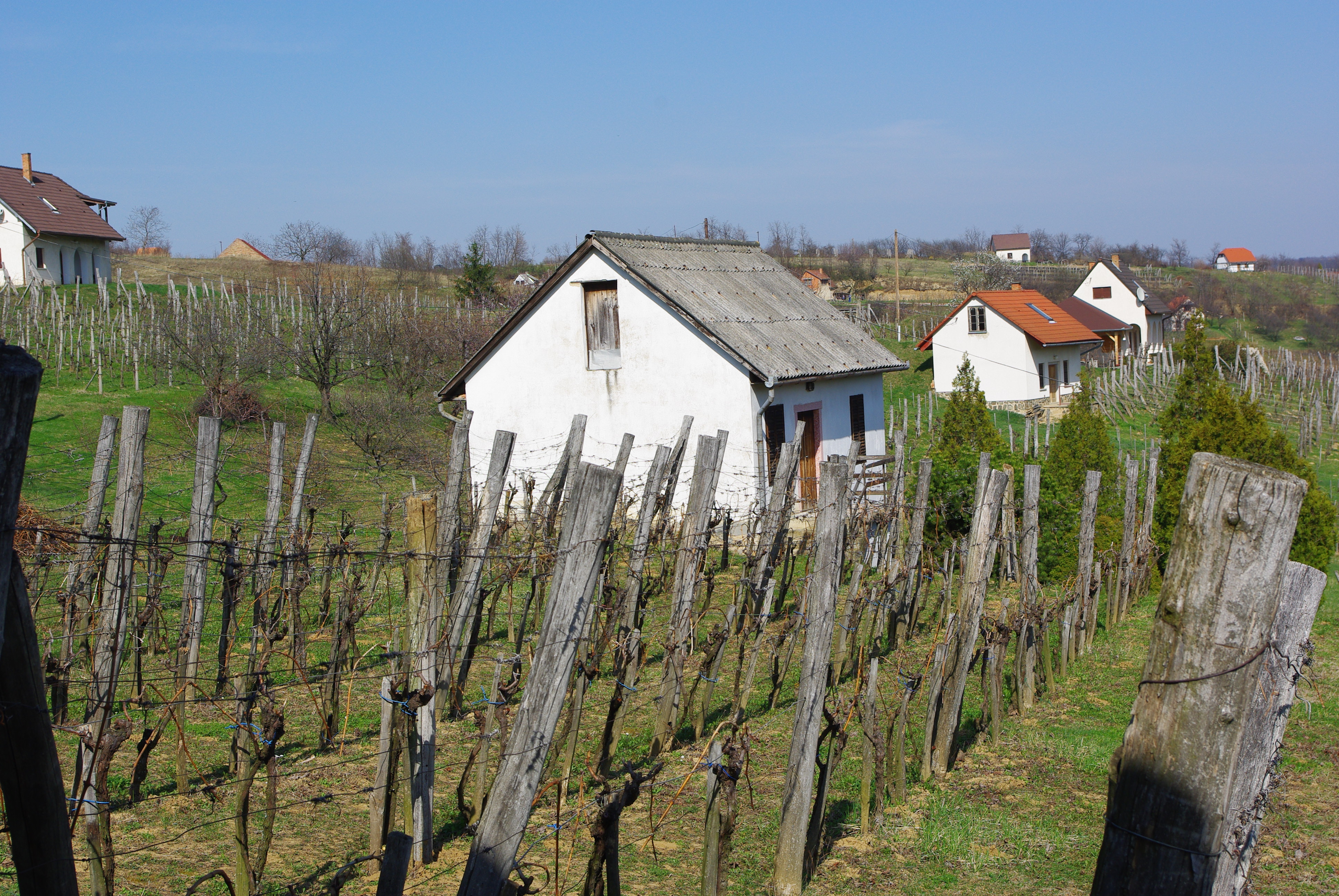
Blaufränkisch/Kékfrankos vines growing in the Mecseknádasd region of southwest Hungary

In Hungary, the grape is known as Kékfrankos (literally "Blue Frankish") and Nagyburgundi. There are more than 8,000 hectares (20,000 acres) of the variety planted throughout the country, particularly around Sopron near the Austrian border of Burgenland, and Eger and Kunság in central Hungary. In the Eger region, Kékfrankos has displaced Kadarka in several modern incarnations of Egri Bikaver (Bull’s Blood).

In Slovenia, the grape is known as Modra Frankinja. At present, there are 2,759,316 reeds of Blue Frankish that are planted in Slovenia, which grow on almost 700 hectares of wine-growing areas. This represents 4.68 percent of all plantations in the country. The variety of Blue Frankish is spread in two wine-growing regions Podravje and Posavje. It's the fourth most common variety of red grapes in Slovenia.

Blaufränkisch goes by the name Burgund Mare in Romania, where most of the variety's 891 planted hectares (2,200 acres) are located in the southern wine regions of Ștefănești and Dealu Mare. In recent years, plantings of the grape have expanded eastward towards warmer vineyard sites near the Black Sea. In Bulgaria, for many years the Blaufränkisch plantings in the country, known as Gamé, were thought to be the Gamay noir grape grown in the Beaujolais wine region of France until DNA evidence proved that it was in fact Blaufränkisch.

In Croatia, the nearly 880 hectares (2,200 acres) of Blaufränkisch, known as Frankovka, represent around 2.7% of all Croatian vineyard plantings. This number is expected to rise, as many plantings previously thought to be a different variety, Borgonja, have now been proven by DNA testing to be Blaufränkisch. Most of the Croatian plantings are found in the Kontinentalna Hrvatska (Continental Croatia) region in the northwestern part of the country and on the Istrian peninsula along the Adriatic Sea. In Serbia, most of the plantings of Blaufränkisch are found in the province of Vojvodina.

In Italy, the grape is known as Franconia Nera, with 127 hectares (310 acres) planted mostly in the Friuli-Venezia Giulia wine regions of the Friuli Isonzo and Friuli Latisana Denominazione di origine controllata. In Spain, some experimental plantings of Blaufränkisch are found in the Spanish wine region of Málaga and Sierras de Málaga, where a German-descended winemaker is making varietal wines under the synonym Lemberger.

=== New World wine regions ===
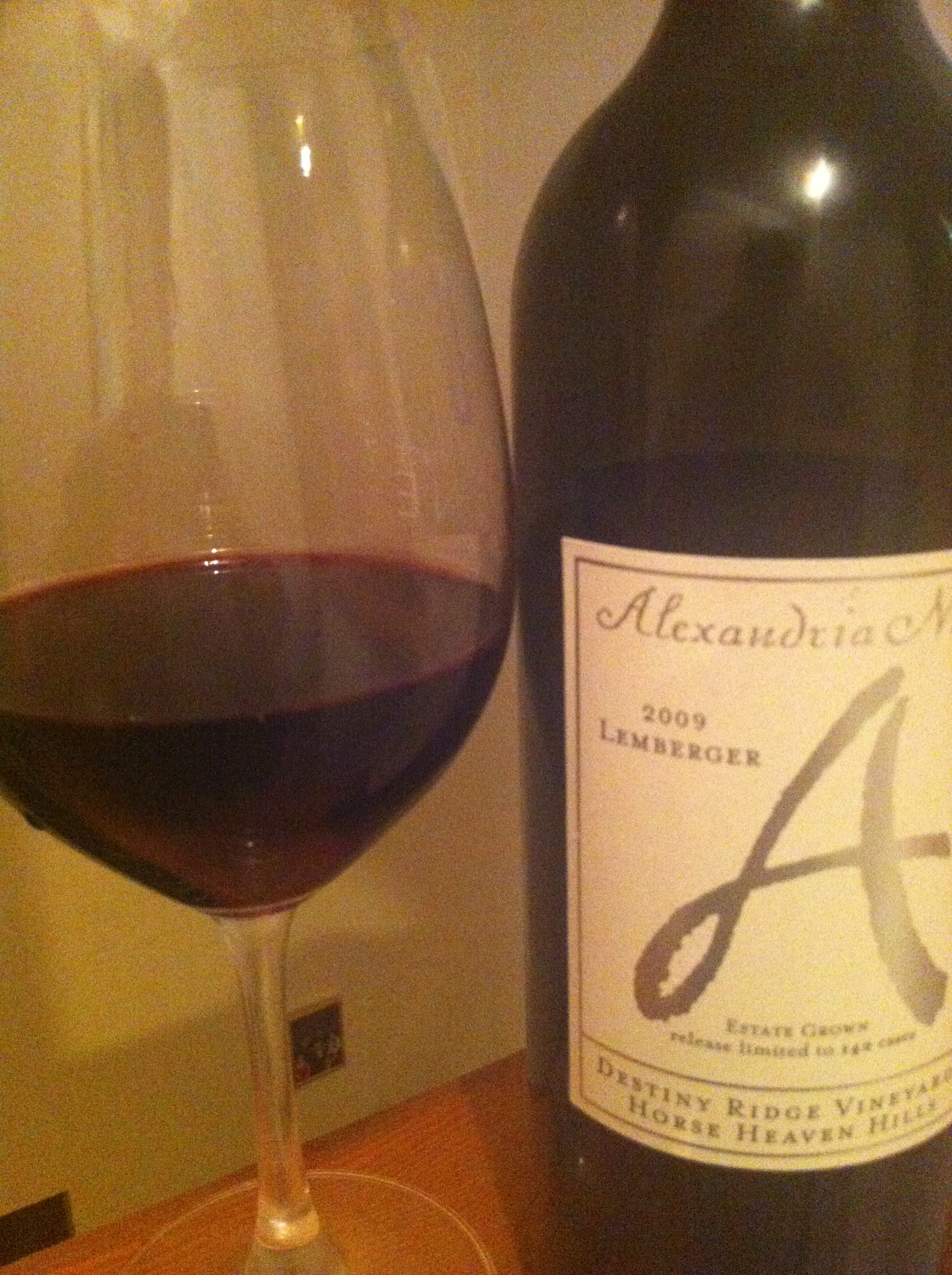
Lemberger wine from Washington State

In the New World Blaufränkisch is found in the Australian wine region of the Adelaide Hills, where a single grower, Hahndorf Hill, has been growing this variety for the past 20 years to make a full-bodied version of this wine. Other producers in Australia have recently planted Blaufränkisch and will soon be presenting their own versions. In Canada, there are some plantings of the variety in Ontario in the Niagara region, British Columbia wine regions of Vancouver Island, Nova Scotia, and the Okanagan Valley.

The grape can be found across the United States, from the Finger Lakes, Cayuga Lake, Hudson River Region and Long Island AVAs in New York, where it often blended with Cabernet franc, to California, (particularly the Lodi and Temecula Valley AVAs) and Washington State. In Pennsylvania, varietal and blended wines are produced in the Lake Erie (which also includes Ohio and New York) and Lehigh Valley AVAs. The Snake River Valley AVA in Idaho is home to a few hectares of the grape. Blaufränkisch has recently been making strides in New Jersey, specifically in the Outer Coastal Plain AVA, becoming a stand out grape for this region. Additional plantings are found in New Mexico, Virginia in both the Shenandoah Valley and Monticello AVAs at Hazy Mountain's two vineyard sites, Rhode Island, Maryland, Michigan, Montana, Colorado and the greater Southeastern New England AVA.

In Canada, Lemberger is found in several planting in the Niagara Peninsula DVA.

==== Washington Lemberger ====
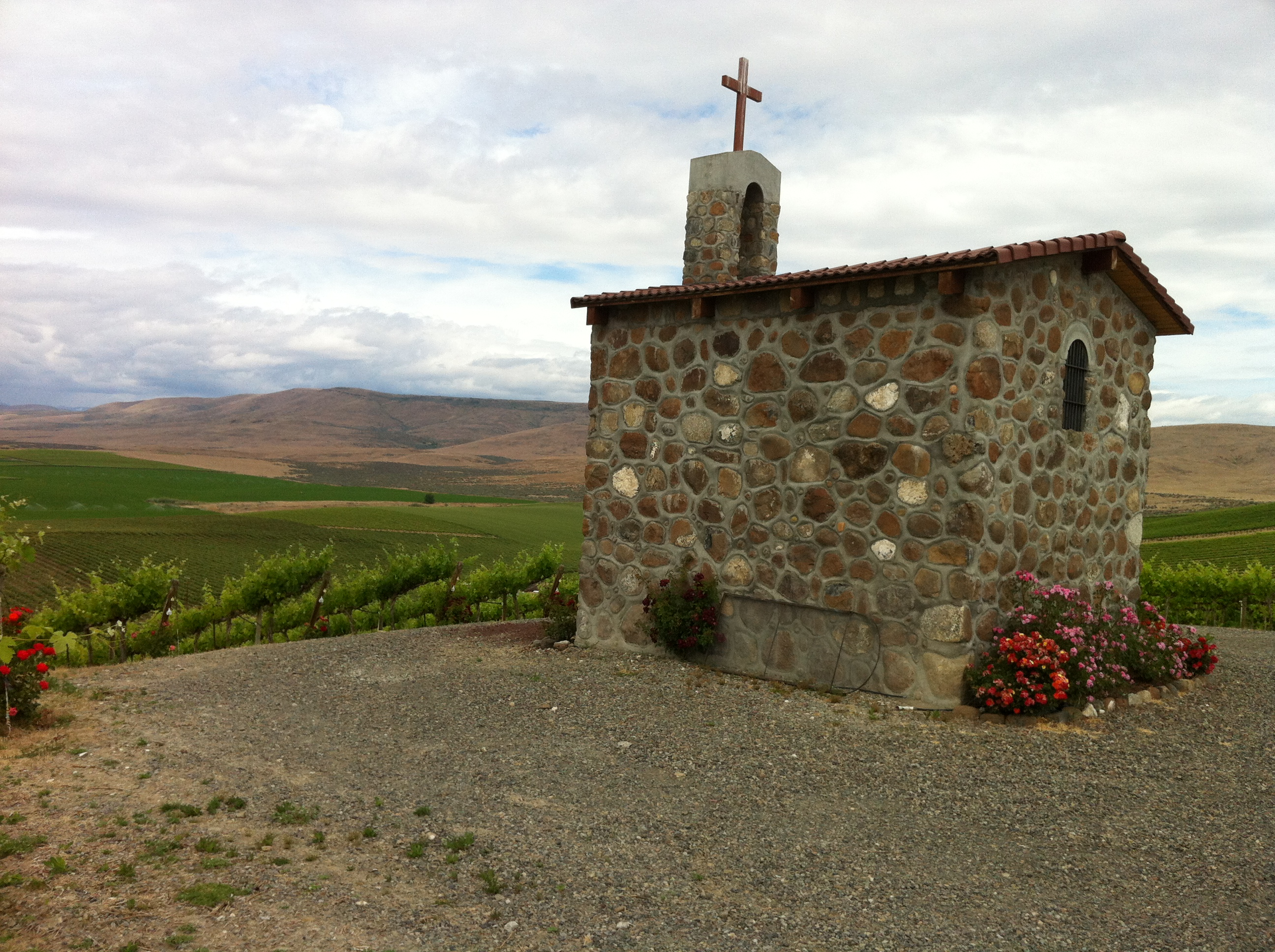
Along with Champoux Vineyard in the Horse Heaven Hills and Kiona Vineyard on Red Mountain, Red Willow Vineyard in the Yakima Valley (pictured) is home to some of the oldest Lemberger vines in Washington State.

The grape has a long history in Washington State, where it known mostly as Lemberger. Here the grape has been used to produce a variety of styles from light bodied claret-style blends, higher bodied more alcoholic "Zinfandel-like" wines to port style fortified wines. The grape was a favorite of Dr. Walter Clore, the "father of Washington wine". He encouraged the grape's planting throughout the Yakima Valley AVA in the 1960s and 1970s. In 1976, John Williams of Kiona Vineyard in what is now the Red Mountain AVA planted a few hectares that would be used in 1980 to make the first commercial Lemberger wine produced in Washington.

As of 2011 there were 30 hectares (74 acres) of the variety planted throughout the Columbia Valley AVA, including Red Willow Vineyard in the Yakima Valley AVA, Champoux Vineyard (which along with Kiona and Red Willow has some of the oldest Lemberger vines in the state) and Destiny Ridge Vineyard in the Horse Heaven Hills AVA, with additional plantings in the Rattlesnake Hills and Columbia Gorge AVAs.

Despite the grape's history, winemakers have had a difficult time marketing the grape due to consumers' association of the name Lemberger with the smelly cheese of a similar name. Some winemakers have taken the approach of California winemaker Jed Steele who, in partnership with Chateau Ste. Michelle, makes a Washington Blaufränkisch that he labels under the proprietary name "Blue Franc" to avoid using the names Lemberger or Blaufränkisch which have also not fared well among consumers.

According to wine expert Paul Gregutt, Washington Lembergers are characterized by their "blood red" color, with light peppery spice aromas and flavors of ripe berry fruit.

== Wines and food pairings ==
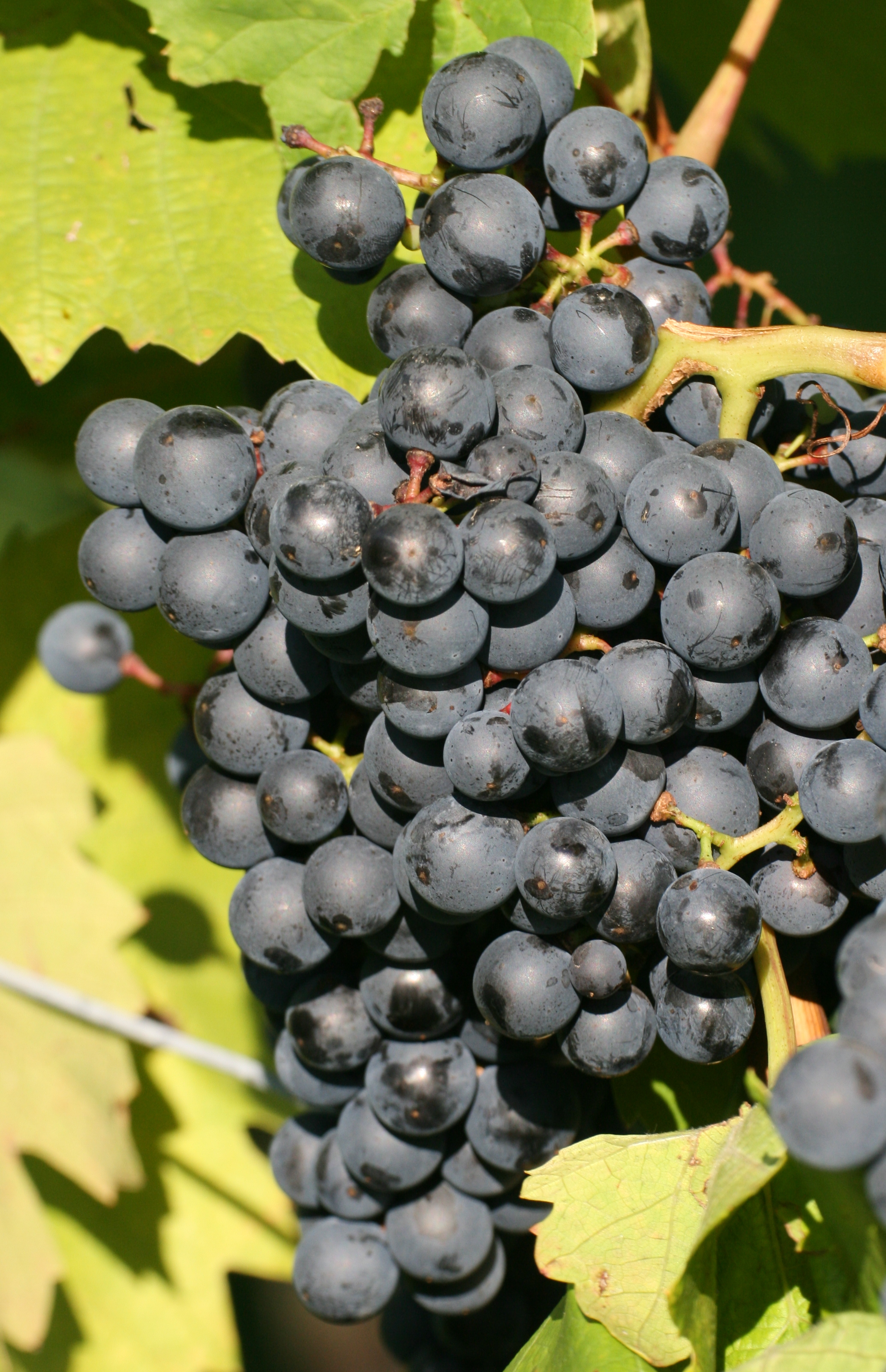
Wines made from Blaufränkisch are often characterized by berry fruit flavors and peppery spice notes.

Blaufränkisch wines have aromas of dark ripe cherries and dark berries, are spicy, have medium tannin levels and sometimes very good acidity. Young wines are deeply fruity and become more velvety, supple and complex with age.

According to wine expert Oz Clarke, well made examples of Blaufränkisch will have notes of red currants and blackberry fruit. The grape does have the potential to have high tannins and acidity levels which can be moderated by harvest decisions and some oak aging. However, Clarke notes that wines from Blaufränkisch can take on too much oak flavoring and come across as excessively oaky. When blended with other varieties, Blaufränkisch often contributes acidity and structure to the blend.

In food and wine pairings, Blaufränkisch/Lemberger are often paired with lamb dishes and grilled meats.

== Offspring and relationship to other varieties ==
At one time it was believed that Blaufränkisch was a clone of the Gamay grape of Beaujolais, due in part to the prevalence of the synonym Gamé used in Bulgaria, and perhaps because it was thought that there was a parent-offspring relationship between the two. However, in the 21st century DNA evidence showed that Blaufränkisch was an offspring of Gouais blanc and an unknown parent, making it a half-sibling to Gamay as well as other varieties of grapes which have Gouais blanc as a parent such as Chardonnay, Riesling, Elbling, Aramon noir, Grolleau noir, Muscadelle and Colombard.

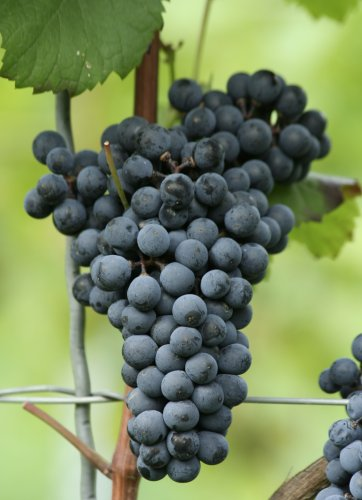
In Germany Blaufränkisch was crossed with Cabernet Sauvignon to produce Cabernet Mitos (pictured).

Blaufränkisch is a parent to Zweigelt, the most widely planted red grape in Austria, from a crossing with St. Laurent (also known as Sankt Laurent) done in 1922 by Dr. Fritz Zweigelt at the Klosterneuburg research facilities in Vienna. This same Blaufränkisch x Sankt Laurent pairing was used to produce the Czech/Slovak grape André. Dr. Zweigelt also crossed Blaufränkisch with Blauer Portugieser to produce Blauburger, with August Herold using the same pairing to produce Heroldrebe in 1929 at the Weinsberg research center in Baden-Württemberg. Also at Weinsberg, Blaufränkisch was crossed with Dornfelder to produce Acolon, and with Cabernet Sauvignon to produce both Cabernet Cubin and Cabernet Mitos in 1970.

In 1951 researchers at the Szent István University in Hungary crossed Blaufränkisch with Kadarka to produce Rubintos. Two years later they crossed the grape with Muscat Bouschet, (an offspring of Petit Bouschet), to produce Magyarfrankos.

In 1986 Blaufränkisch was crossed with Regent at a research facility at Geilweilerhof to produce Reberger.

== Synonyms ==
Over the years Blaufränkisch has been known under a variety of synonyms including Blanc doux, Blau Fränkisch, Blau Fränkische, Blauer Limberger (Germany), Blaufränkische, Blaufranchis, Blaufranchisch, Blue French, Borgonja (Croatia), Burgund Mare (Romania), Cerne Skalicke, Cerne Starosvetske, Cerny Muskatel, Chirokolistny, Cierny Zierfandler, Crna Frankovka (Croatia), Crna Moravka, Fernon, Fränkische, Fränkische schwarz, Franconia (Italy), Franconia nera (Itay), Franconia nero, Franconien bleu, Franconien noir, Frankinja, Frankinja modra, Frankovka (Croatia, Serbia, Czech Republic), Modra Frankinja (Slovenia), Frankovka modrá (Slovakia), Imbergher, Jubiläumsrebe, Gamay noire, Gamé (Bulgaria), Karmazin, Kék Frankos, Kékfrank, Kékfrankos (Hungary), Lampart, Lemberger (Germany and United States), Limberg, Limberger (Germany), Limberger blauer, Limberger noir, Limburske, Maehrische, Modra Frankija, Modra Frankinja, Modry hyblink, Moravka, Moravske, Muskateller schwarz, Nagy burgundi, Nagyburgundi (Hungary), Neskorak, Neskore, Neskore cierne, Noir de Franconie, Oporto (Slovakia), Orna Frankovka, Portugais lerouse, Portugais rouge, Portugieser rother, Pozdni, Pozdni skalicke cerne, Schwarz Limberger, Schwarze Fraenkische, Schwarzer Burgunder, Schwarzgrobe, Serina, Shirokolistnyi, Sirokolidtnyj, Sirokolstnii, Skalicke cerne, Starovetsky hrozen, Sura Liscina (Serbia), Szeleslevelü, Teltfürtü Kékfrankos, Vaghyburgundi, Velke burgundské and Vojvodin.
