= Goldburger =

Variety of grape

- Grape (Vitis)
- Color of berry skin: Blanc
- Species: Vitis vinifera
- Also called: see list of synonyms
- Origin: Klosterneuburg, Austria
- Notable regions: Burgenland
- VIVC number: 4868

Goldburger is a white Austrian wine grape grown primarily in the Burgenland region. The grape is a crossing of Orangetraube and Welschriesling and was created in 1922 by Fritz Zweigelt at the Höhere Bundeslehranstalt und Bundesamt für Wein- und Obstbau (HBLAuBA) in Klosterneuburg.

== Synonyms ==
Goldburger is also known under the synonyms Klosterneuburg 16-8 and Orangeriesling.
