= Frankish and Hunnic grape varieties =

Variety of grape

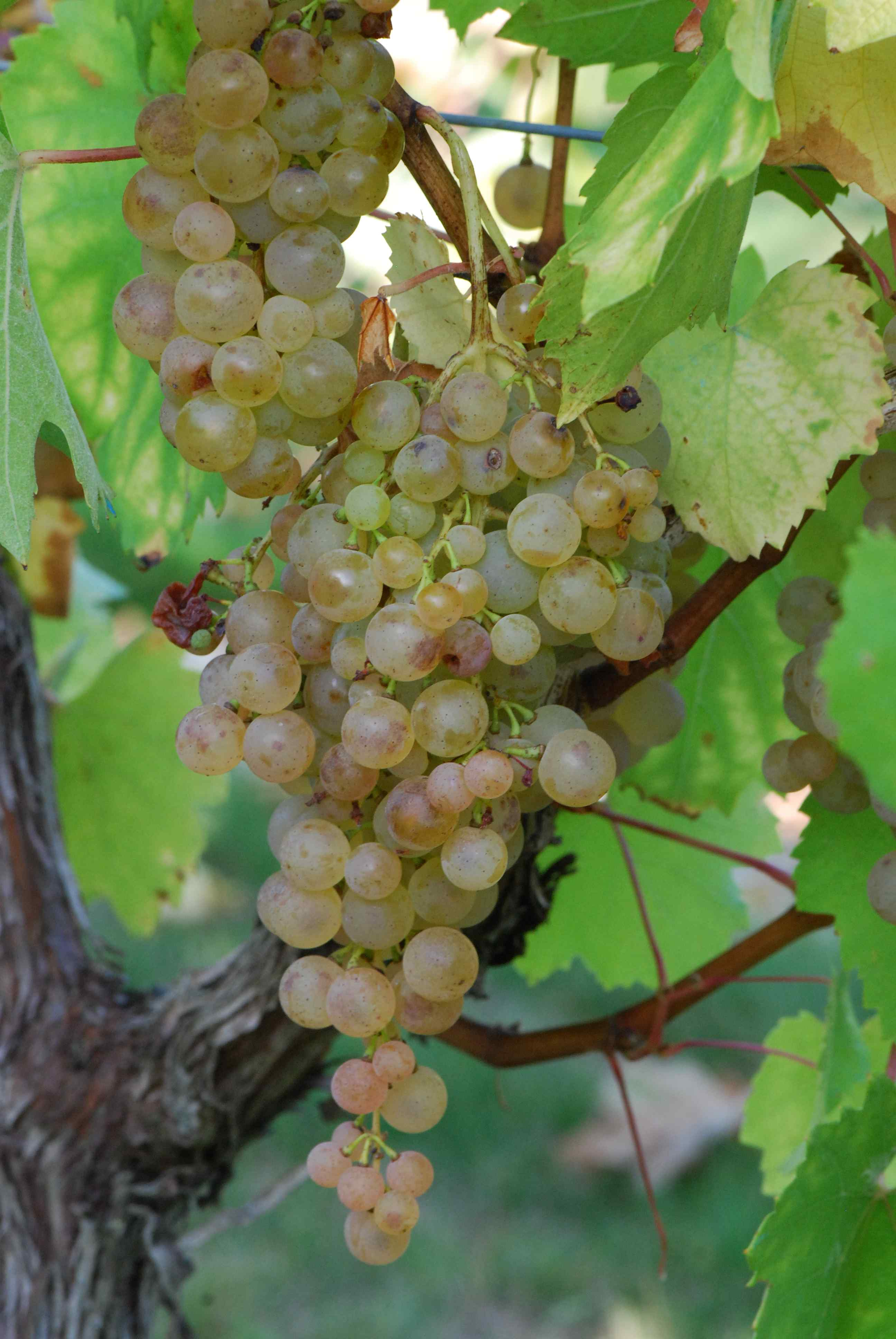
Gouais blanc, also known as Weißer Heunisch, is a Hunnic variety

A division of grape varieties into Frankish and Hunnic grape varieties was practiced in German-speaking countries in the Middle Ages and separated varieties considered to be better from those considered to be lesser. Frankish (fränkisch) grapes were considered noble grapes, and the designation derived from the Franks, as popular belief held that those were grapes introduced by Charlemagne or at least through his edicts. Hunnic (hunnisch or heunisch) grapes, on the other hand, were the simpler varieties.

It is unclear whether it was actually believed that these varieties had been introduced by the Huns, or if the term Hunnic was just used as a pejorative. Another possibility is that heunisch derives not directly from the Huns but from a related old Low German word for "large" (hunisc, cf archaic Modern German Hüne "hulk, giant") that was applied to grape varieties with large berries (huniscdrubo in the Summarium Heinrici) which give higher yields than the smaller-berried "Frankish" varieties, but wines of lower quality and less concentrated flavours.

== History ==
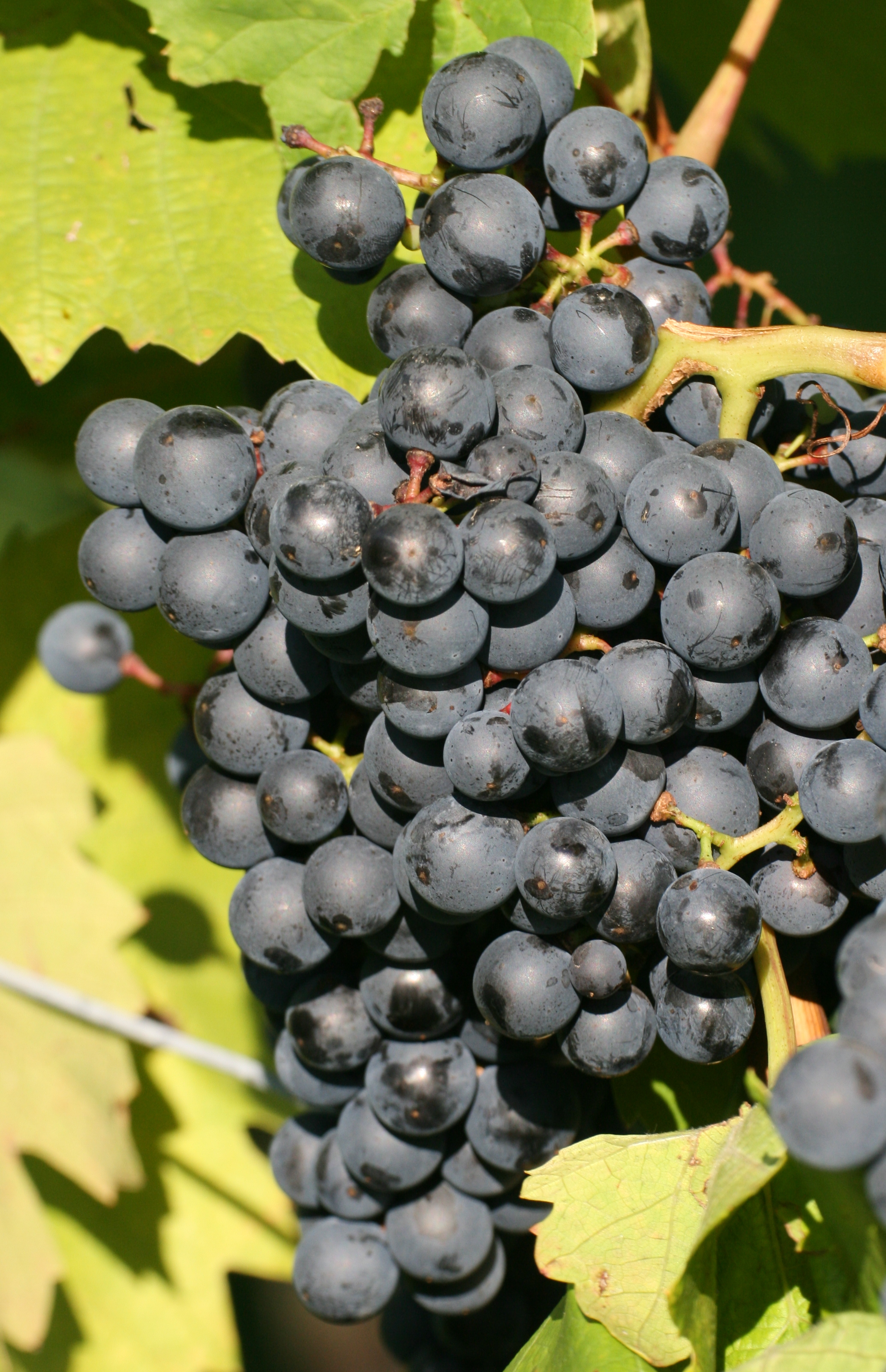
Blaufränkisch (blue Frankish) is, as its name suggest, a Frankish grape variety

These terms can be traced back to the early Middle Ages. As an example, the mystic Hildegard of Bingen wrote in the 12th century that the Frankish wine was stronger and set the blood so much in motion that it was necessary to dilute it with water, while the Hunnic wine was more watery by nature and therefore had not to be diluted. Some of the earliest specific varieties to be mentioned as Frankisch were Traminer, Pinot gris and Riesling in the 14th to 15th centuries. It could be noted that more than 500 years of not very well-documented viticultural history and highly uncertain grape identification separate Charlemagne and these written claims. Other traditional Frankish varieties are Elbling, Orléans, Pinot noir and Silvaner.

The terms live on in the present names or synonyms of many varieties, such as Blaufränkisch (blue Frankish) and Weisser Heunisch (white Hunnic), the German name of Gouais blanc.

== Relationship to other grapes ==
DNA profiling from the 1990s has revealed that many classical grape varieties are crosses with parents in both the Frankish and Hunnic groups. Three examples with Gouais blanc as one parent are Chardonnay, which is a cross with Pinot (probably Pinot noir), Riesling, whose other parent is an undetermined cross with Traminer parentage, and indeed Blaufränkisch itself, which derives from Gouais blanc and the Argant clone Blaue Zimmettraube. Thus, the Frankish group of varieties does not have a totally separate pedigree from the Hunnic group. This has led to a resurgent interest in the Hunnic grapes, many of which lead a dwindling existence and are on the brink of becoming extinct.

== See also ==
- International variety
