= Cabernet Mitos =

Variety of grape

- Grape (Vitis)
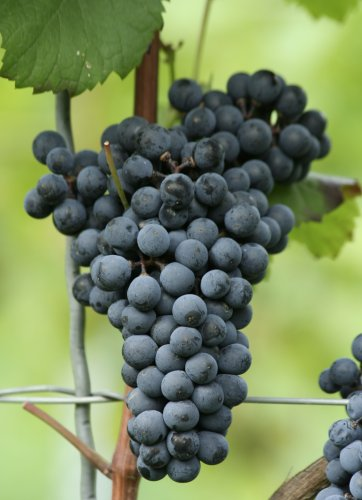
- Cabernet Mitos grapes
- Species: Vitis vinifera
- Also called: Weinsberg 70-77-4 F
- Origin: Weinsberg, Baden-Württemberg, Germany
- VIVC number: 15499

Cabernet Mitos is a dark-skinned variety of grape used for red wine. It was created at a grape breeding institute in Weinsberg in the Württemberg wine region, Germany in 1970 by crossing Blaufränkisch and Teinturier du Cher. The previous belief that it was a cross between Blaufränkisch and Cabernet Sauvignon, which even the breeders themselves stated, was corrected in 2013 through a DNA analysis. "Mitos" is the German word for mitosis, a stage in the cell cycle. Cabernet Mitos received varietal protection and was released for general cultivation on January 24, 2001. The vines of Cabernet Mitos show good winter hardiness.

In 2006, there were 317 hectares (780 acres) of Cabernet Mitos in Germany, with an increasing trend.

Cabernet Mitos wines are full bodied and rich in tannin, and are well suited for oak barrel aging. The wines show similarities in aromas to Cabernet Sauvignon.

== Synonyms ==
It is known under the synonyms (breeding codes) We 70-77-4 F and Weinsberg 70-77-4 F.
