= Blauer Portugieser =

Variety of grape

- Grape (Vitis)
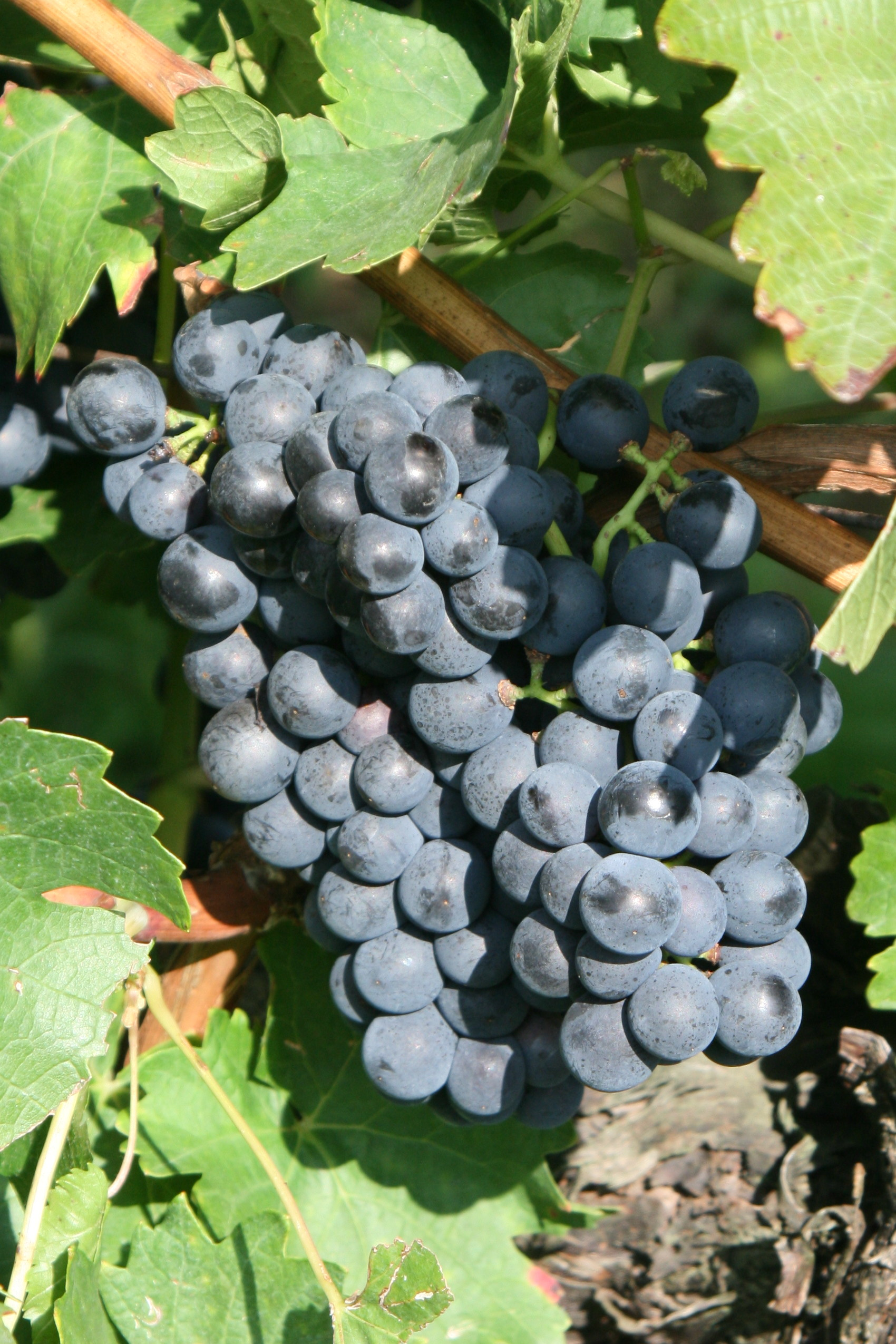
- Blauer Portugieser in Weinsberg, Germany
- Species: Vitis vinifera
- Also called: Autrichien, Badener, Blaue Feslauertraube, Feslauer, Modrý Portugal (Czech Republic), Kékoportó (Hungary), Portugizac Plavi(Croatia), modra portugalka (Slovenia), Oporto, Portugais Bleu (France), Portugieser and Vöslauer
- Origin: Lower Styria (now Slovenian Styria)
- Notable regions: Rheinhessen, Pfalz
- VIVC number: 9620

Blauer Portugieser is a red Austrian, Slovenian wine, Croatian wine, Moravian and German wine grape found primarily in the Rheinhessen, Pfalz and wine regions of Lower Austria, Slovenia and Croatia. It is also one of the permitted grapes in the Hungarian wine Egri Bikavér (Bull's blood). In Germany, the cultivated area covered 4,551 hectares (11,250 acres) or 4.5% of the total vineyard area in 2007. Wine cellars usually vinify a simple light red wine, which is characterized by a fresh, tart and light body. It is also frequently vinified as a rosé. Blauer Portugieser is also very well suited as table grapes; however, it is not sold as such because the selling of wine grapes as table grapes is not permitted in the European Union. Since 2000, higher quality wines have been vinified from Portugieser grapes. The use of oak provides additional aromas in order to compete with Bordeaux varieties. DNA profiling has shown that Blauer Portugieser is a cross between Grüner Silvaner (male parent) and Blaue Zimmettraube (female parent; the offspring of Blauer Gänsfüsser). Historical ampelographic sources have provided very solid evidence that the geographic area of origin of the variety is Lower Styria (today Slovenian Styria).

== History ==
Despite the suggestion of the grape's name of having a Portuguese origin, ampelographers have uncovered little evidence to suggest that this is the case. It is often said that the Austrian Johann von Fries brought it from Porto to his estates near Vöslau in 1772. In Hungary it was called kékoportó until recently for that reason. There is evidence to indicate that the grape was widely established in Austria by the 19th century and that it was then that cuttings were brought to Germany. From there the grape increased in planting, becoming very popular during the German red wine boom of the 1970s, when it surpassed Pinot noir (Spätburgunder) in red grape plantings.

== Viticulture and winemaking ==
The grape is a relatively easy to grow due to high resistance to various vine and grape disease such as coulure. It does have some susceptibility to oidium though. The vine can be very prolific producing yields that often average 7 tons per acre (120 hl/ha). A negative consequences of these high yields is that this normally magnifies the grape's naturally low acidity level which, if not corrected during winemaking, can produce "flabby" and dull wines. Being produced in generally cool climates, the grape is often chaptalized to boost the alcohol levels. In the past some producers would excessively chaptalize to the point where the higher sugar levels would stun the yeast during fermentation, leaving noticeable amounts of residual sugar and sweetness in the wine.

== Wine regions ==
The grape is most commonly found in Austria and Germany but also has some presence in other regions in Central Europe. In Austria the grape is grown in Lower Austria around the towns of Alberndorf im Pulkautal, Retz and Thermenregion. It is Austria's third most planted red grape variety after Zweigelt and Blaufränkisch. In Germany the grape is often found in the Rheinhessen and Pfalz where it is used to make every day table wine and Weissherbst (rosé). In the Ahr, it is often blended with Spätburgunder. In Romania and Hungary the grape was once known as Kékoporto or "blue port" but has been renamed Portugieser in recent times. Here the grape can produce a deep color, more fuller bodied wine that is often aged in oak. In Hungary it is primarily grown in the wine regions of Villány, Eger and Szekszárd. It is often blended with Kékfrankos (Blaufränkisch) and is a permitted ingredient in the Egri Bikavér (Bull's Blood) cuvée. In Croatia the grape is made in a Beaujolais nouveau style. In South West France the grape is known as Portugais Bleu and is on the decline in the Tarn department but it is still a permitted grape in the Gaillac wine Gaillac Rouge.

== Synonyms ==
In other parts of the world the grape is known under a variety of synonyms including Autrichien, Badener, Blaue Feslauertraube, Feslauer, Kékoportó (Hungary), Modrý Portugal (Czech Republic), Portugizac Plavi (Croatia), Modra Portugalka (Slovenia), Oporto, Portugais Bleu (France), Portugieser, Vöslauer, Portugizac Crni and Portugaljka.
